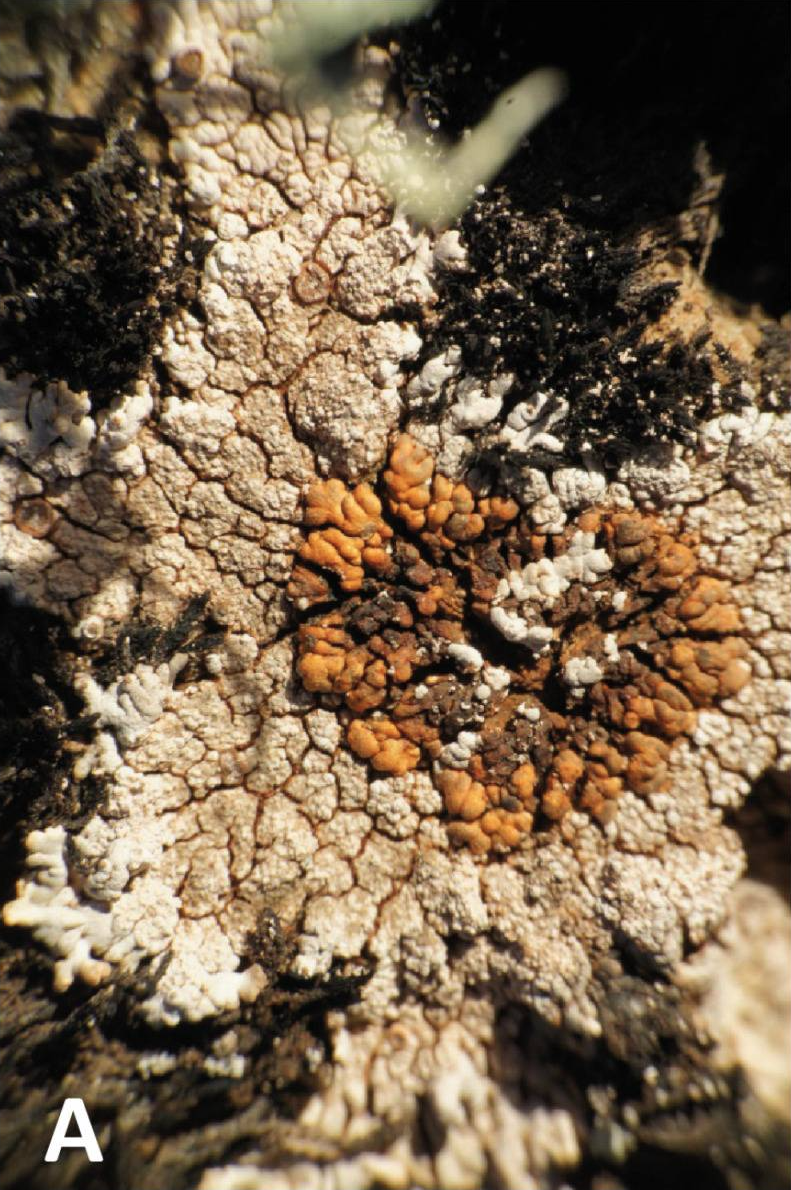

Scientific classification
- Kingdom: Fungi
- Division: Ascomycota
- Class: Lecanoromycetes
- Order: Baeomycetales
- Family: Trapeliaceae
- Genus: Placopsis
- Species: P. antarctica

Binomial name
- Placopsis antarctica D.J.Galloway, R.I.L.Sm. & Quilhot (2005)

= Placopsis antarctica =

Species of lichen

Placopsis antarctica is a species of crustose lichen in the family Trapeliaceae. It is found only in Antarctica, where it forms pale-coloured, circular patches on rock surfaces, typically 1–3 cm (3/8–1 3/16 in) across, with distinctive finger-like projections that break down into powdery structures. The lichen contains both green algae and blue-green algae (cyanobacteria) as partners, allowing it to both photosynthesise and convert nitrogen from the air into a form that can be used by other organisms. These circular patches can occasionally grow up to 6 cm (2 3/8 in) in diameter, with edges that show neat, fan-like folds and can appear either swollen or slightly flattened.

First described by scientists in 2005, P. antarctica grows on rocks in ice-free areas of the South Orkney Islands, South Shetland Islands, and Antarctic Peninsula, from near sea level up to 550 m (1,800 ft) in elevation. It is one of the first organisms to colonise areas newly exposed by retreating glaciers, helping to establish conditions that allow other species to grow. Studies have shown that the species is sensitive to warming temperatures, suggesting it may be vulnerable to climate change. The species shows particular success on rock surfaces, where it commonly grows alongside other lichens such as Lendemeriella exsecuta, Lepraria neglecta, and Pannaria hookeri.

== Taxonomy ==
Placopsis antarctica was first formally described in 2005 by the lichenologists David J. Galloway, Ronald I. Lewis-Smith, and Wanda Quilhot. The holotype specimen was collected from Robert Island in the South Shetland Islands in January 1989. Prior to its formal description, specimens of P. antarctica had been misidentified as P. parellina in Antarctic lichen surveys. However, detailed examination of Southern Hemisphere Placopsis material revealed that P. parellina (in the strict sense) is actually a squamulose, non-sorediate species restricted to dry, disturbed habitats in central Chile's coastal ranges, and does not occur in Antarctica or New Zealand.

The species shows morphological similarities to Placopsis fuscidula but can be distinguished by its distinctive laminal dactyls, which are nodular, swollen structures that erode at the tips to form soredia. These dactyls are easily dislodged by environmental factors such as wind, water, or mechanical abrasion, leaving distinctive pitted holes with eroded, powdery edges. While P. cribellans, another species in the genus, also develops laminal pits, these are formed by the abrasion of small spherical isidia and never become sorediate.

The genus Placopsis itself comprises about 60 named species worldwide and shows its highest diversity in the Southern Hemisphere, particularly in New Zealand and southern South America. Recent molecular studies have indicated that the genus as currently circumscribed is paraphyletic, though P. antarctica's specific phylogenetic position within the genus has not yet been determined.

== Description ==
Placopsis antarctica is a crust-like lichen that grows tightly attached to rock surfaces, forming circular patches (known as thalli) that typically measure 1–3 cm (3/8–1 3/16 in) across, though they can occasionally reach up to 6 cm (2 3/8 in) in diameter. The edges of these patches have neat, fan-like folds and can appear either swollen or slightly flattened. Unlike some related species, P. antarctica does not develop a visible dark border (prothallus) around its edges.

The lichen forms elongated segments (lobes) that are curved outward and measure 0.5–1.0 mm wide, becoming broader at their tips where they can reach up to 2.5 mm (1/8 in). These lobes grow side by side or slightly overlapping, radiating outward from the centre like spokes of a wheel. As the lichen grows, the lobes become separated by narrow to deep cracks that can extend 0.5–1.2 cm (3/16–1/2 in) in length.

The upper surface of P. antarctica can appear in various pale shades, ranging from creamy white to ivory, light pink, or greyish. In some areas, it displays patches of sparkling, crystal-like white powder (pruina). One of its most distinctive features is the presence of small, finger-like projections called dactyls that grow from the surface. These rounded structures measure 0.2–1.0 mm across and can occur either individually or in dense clusters. The tops of these dactyls either develop a warty appearance or erode, breaking down into coarse, granular, white powder-like structures (soredia) or forming small, white, powder-filled pits.

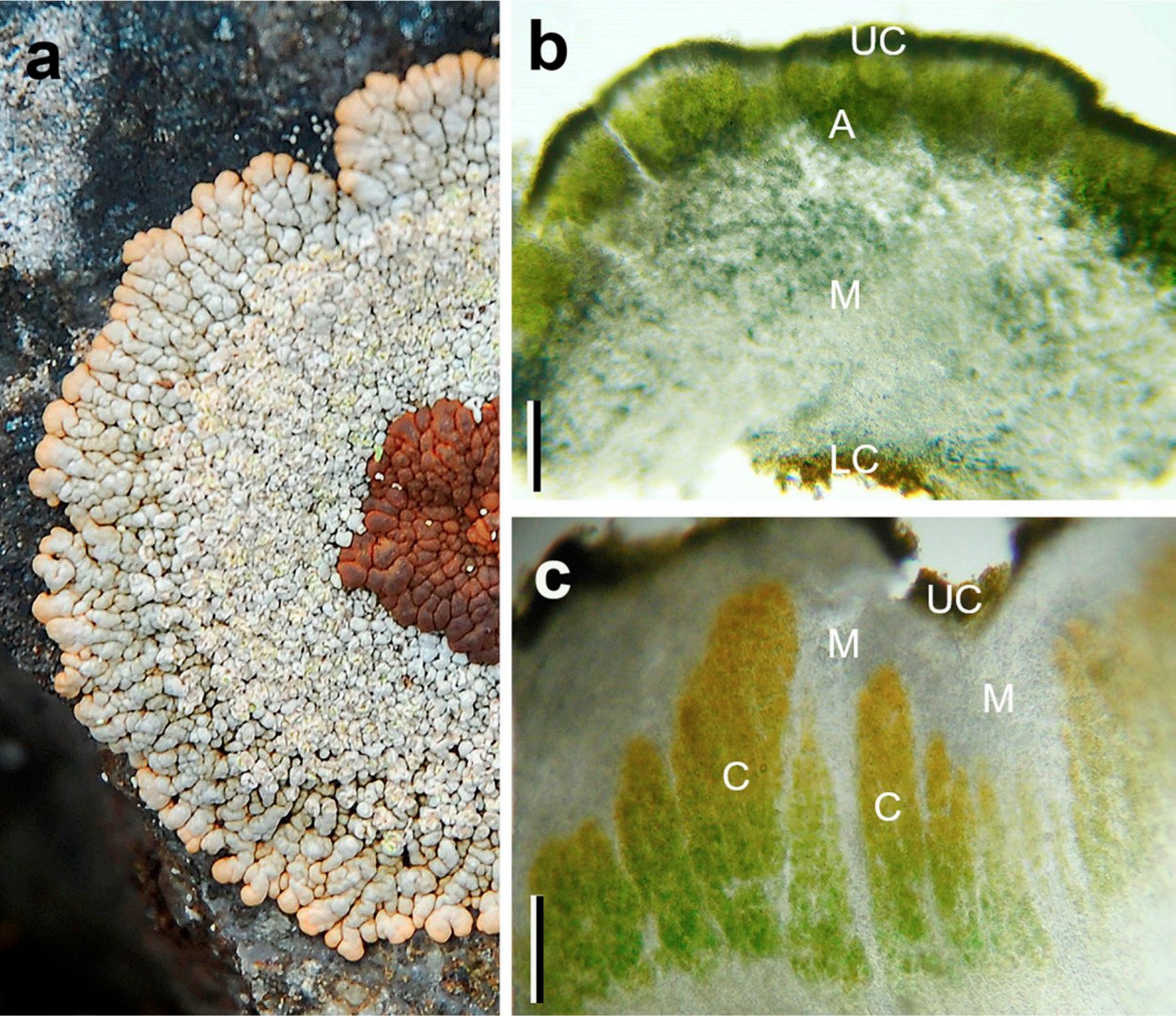
Placopsis antarctica showing (a) thallus (b) green photobiont section (c) lower cortex. The four depicted thalline layers are the upper cortex (UC), green-algal layer (A), medulla (M), cephalodium (C), and lower cortex (LC).

The lichen's reproductive structures (apothecia) are scattered across the surface, appearing as disc-like formations that measure between 0.2 and 3.2 mm in diameter. These discs are rust-coloured when wet and vary from light to dark reddish-brown when dry. Each disc is surrounded by a prominent rim that matches the colour of the main body of the lichen.

Inside its structure, P. antarctica contains two different types of photosynthetic partners: green algal cells that are round and measure 8–10 micrometres (μm) in diameter, and specialised structures called cephalodia that contain blue-green algae (cyanobacteria). These cephalodia appear as scattered, circular patches measuring 2–8 mm across (occasionally up to 15 mm), and are notable for their colour change – appearing bluish purple when wet and pale pinkish brown when dry. Chemical analysis reveals that the lichen produces two specific acid compounds: gyrophoric acid as its main component and lecanoric acid in smaller amounts.

Placopsis antarctica contains a photosynthetic partner (photobiont) from the group of green algae (Chlorophyta). A 2019 study identified this photobiont as Stichococcus antarcticus, which was later reclassified in the genus Deuterostichococcus. This photobiont relationship appears to be specific and stable, as later metabarcoding research found Deuterostichococcus to be consistently present as the main photobiont in P. antarctica thalli. Placopsis species, including P. antarctica, serve as pioneer colonisers in recently deglaciated Antarctic soils, with molecular evidence showing greater photobiont diversity in specimens from areas that have been ice-free for longer periods.

Detailed morphometric studies of P. antarctica from King George Island have found that its central cephalodium is elliptical rather than round, measuring approximately 2.4 mm long by 1.7 mm wide. The species' marginal lobes are wider at their apex (mean 1.4 mm) than at their base (mean 0.5 mm). Side cephalodia are smaller than the central one, measuring about 1.0 mm long by 0.6 mm wide. The thallus contains numerous sorediate pits that are typically elliptical, with a mean length of 439 μm and width of 323 μm, giving them a length-to-width ratio of about 1.36.

DNA barcoding studies have helped validate species boundaries and identification accuracy for lichens in Antarctica. The internal transcribed spacer (ITS) region has proven useful as a DNA barcode marker for identifying P. antarctica and distinguishing it from other Placopsis species. However, DNA studies have revealed that Antarctic lichen diversity is still incompletely characterised, with new molecular evidence sometimes contradicting earlier phenotypic identifications.

== Habitat, distribution, and ecology ==
Placopsis antarctica appears to be endemic to Antarctic regions south of latitude 60°S, where it has been documented in the South Orkney Islands, South Shetland Islands, and the Antarctic Peninsula. The species inhabits siliceous rock surfaces, particularly on moraine boulders, fellfield areas, and coastal volcanic rocks, occurring at elevations ranging from 10 to 550 metres above sea level.

Within its ecological community, P. antarctica is commonly found growing alongside several other lichen species. Its typical associates include Lendemeriella exsecuta, Lepraria neglecta, Pannaria hookeri, Peltularia fuegiana, and Ropalospora rossi. Like other members of the genus Placopsis, this species likely plays a role in its ecosystem through nitrogen fixation, as its cephalodia contain cyanobacterial symbionts (Scytonema) capable of converting atmospheric nitrogen into biologically available forms.

Placopsis antarctica shows distinct physiological adaptations to moisture availability in its habitat. The species can maintain photosynthetic activity across a broad range of water contents, though it performs optimally when its thallus water content is between 30 and 100%. Unlike some other Antarctic lichens that can utilise water from snow sublimation, P. antarctica primarily depends on liquid water from snowmelt and precipitation. This water requirement pattern helps explain its distribution pattern, with the species being more abundant in areas where liquid water is regularly available during the growing season.

The species has been documented at numerous locations throughout its range. In the South Orkney Islands, it has been found on Coronation Island near Sunshine Glacier and in the Moraine Valley of Signy Island. Within the South Shetland Islands, populations have been recorded at Whaler's Bay area on Deception Island and on Robert Island. Along the Antarctic Peninsula, the species occurs at Cape Casey in the Cabinet Inlet of Foyn Coast, and on Rasmussen Island near the Argentine Islands along the Graham Coast.

The species has also been documented on King George Island at Lions Rump, which is designated as Antarctic Specially Protected Area No. 151. This protected area, covering 1.3 km^{2} (0.50 sq mi) of ice-free terrain, was established to preserve its diverse biota and geological features as a representative example of maritime Antarctic terrestrial, limnological, and littoral habitats. Within this protected area, the species occurs at elevations ranging from 65 to 190 m (213 to 623 ft) above sea level, particularly on Chopin Ridge, along Bystry Creek, and on exposed rock outcrops. At Lions Rump, it has been found growing in areas away from direct nutrient influx from bird colonies, associating with other nitrophobic species.

The species' role as a pioneer coloniser is particularly evident in recently deglaciated areas. Its ability to fix nitrogen through its cyanobacterial partner makes it an important early coloniser, helping to establish conditions that allow other species to subsequently colonise. This ecological role is especially significant given the increasing availability of ice-free areas due to glacial retreat in the Antarctic Peninsula region.

=== Climate change response ===
Experimental studies using open-top chambers on King George Island have demonstrated that P. antarctica shows significant sensitivity to warming conditions. When exposed to artificially warmed environments that increased temperatures by 1.4 to 3.3 °C (34.5 to 37.9 °F) above ambient conditions, the species showed reduced photosynthetic activity compared to specimens in natural conditions.

The species shows complex physiological responses to warming, particularly in its photosynthetic performance. Specimens in naturally occurring conditions show significantly higher photosynthetic electron transport rates compared to those in warmed environments. During austral summer, specimens exposed to warming experienced shorter physiologically active periods due to accelerated moisture loss, suggesting that increased temperatures limit the species' photosynthetic activity primarily through enhanced desiccation rather than through direct temperature effects.

Unlike some more widely distributed Antarctic lichen species that can maintain photosynthetic activity across broader temperature ranges, P. antarctica shows reduced photosynthetic efficiency at relatively modest temperature increases. This sensitivity may be related to its specialised role as an endemic Antarctic species adapted to current conditions. Its status as a pioneer coloniser in recently deglaciated areas makes it particularly important for monitoring climate change impacts, though its limited temperature tolerance may affect its role in early soil development and ecosystem succession as warming continues.

The species' vulnerability to future climate change appears particularly pronounced if warming leads to altered precipitation patterns or increased evaporative demand. This susceptibility is especially significant given P. antarctica's role in colonising newly exposed surfaces following glacial retreat, suggesting potential cascading effects on Antarctic terrestrial ecosystem development.

=== Physiological adaptations ===
Placopsis antarctica has several key physiological mechanisms that allow it to survive in harsh Antarctic conditions. The species maintains active photosynthetic processes even at relatively low water content, with its photosynthetic efficiency remaining stable until thallus water content drops below approximately 30%. This indicates well-developed desiccation tolerance mechanisms.

The species employs multiple protective strategies during periods of water stress. When exposed to desiccating conditions, P. antarctica activates nonphotochemical quenching mechanisms that help protect its photosynthetic apparatus from damage. These protective responses begin to engage when the thallus water content falls below 20%, allowing the lichen to maintain cellular function even under severe desiccation.

A distinctive feature of P. antarctica's adaptation is its dual photosynthetic strategy involving both green algal and cyanobacterial photobionts. The cyanobacterial component, located in specialised structures called cephalodia, shows different physiological responses to desiccation compared to the green algal component. The cephalodia maintain photosynthetic capacity at lower water contents than the green algal regions, suggesting a complementary survival strategy that may help the species optimise resource use under varying environmental conditions.

=== Succession and colonisation ===
Studies on the Potter Peninsula, King George Island, have demonstrated that P. antarctica is one of the pioneer species that colonises newly deglaciated areas. The species shows a distinct pattern of colonisation related to time since deglaciation, with its presence increasing with distance from glacier fronts. This colonisation pattern is influenced by multiple environmental factors, including slope angle, substrate type, and altitude. The species shows particular success on rock surfaces, where it serves as one of the initial colonisers establishing lichen communities. Notably, P. antarctica's ability to fix nitrogen through its cyanobacterial partner in cephalodia may play an important role in facilitating subsequent colonisation by other species.
