= Placopsis subcribellans =

Scientific classification
- Kingdom: Fungi
- Division: Ascomycota
- Class: Lecanoromycetes
- Order: Baeomycetales
- Family: Trapeliaceae
- Genus: Placopsis
- Species: P. subcribellans

Binomial name
- Placopsis subcribellans (I.M.Lamb) D.J.Galloway (2002)

Synonyms
- Placopsis parellina f. subcribellans I.M.Lamb (1947)

Species of lichen-forming fungus

Placopsis subcribellans is a species of lichen in the family Trapeliaceae. It forms neat, rounded rosettes with a distinctive glossy, ivory-like sheen, and develops small bud-like outgrowths along radiating cracks in its surface. The species occurs in wet, heavily glaciated regions of southern Chile and Argentina, as well as in southern New Zealand.

== Taxonomy ==
It was originally described as new in 1947 by Elke Mackenzie, as Placopsis parellina forma subcribellans. David Galloway promoted it to species status in 2002.

== Description ==
Placopsis subcribellans is a crustose lichen that typically forms neat, round rosettes about 2–5 (sometimes up to 8) cm across, tightly attached to the substrate. The margin is continuous, flat, and gently scalloped, and the upper surface has a distinctive glossy sheen, similar to polished ivory. As the thallus expands it becomes cut by long, narrow cracks that radiate inwards, while the marginal lobes remain contiguous rather than breaking apart. Small isidia develop mainly along these fissures, appearing as rounded to slightly flattened outgrowths that can break away and help the lichen spread. Shallow, dome-like cephalodia (structures housing the cyanobacterial partner) are usually concentrated towards the centre and may also form in concentric arcs.

When fertile, the lichen produces rather sparse, sessile apothecia with pale pinkish to rusty-brown discs. The disc surface is often minutely roughened and may become cracked with age, sometimes with a light dusting of white pruina. Under the microscope, the spore-bearing layer (the hymenium) is about 190–210(–240) μm tall and contains scattered oil droplets. The colourless ascospores are oval to ellipsoid, about 15–24 × 8.5–12 μm, and the asexual propagules are curved, thread-like conidia around 21–24 × 1 μm.

== Habitat and distribution ==
In southern South America Placopsis subcribellans is known from wet, heavily glaciated districts of southern Chile (about 44°S–55°S), with additional records from neighbouring Argentina (including Tierra del Fuego and Isla de los Estados) and from southern New Zealand. Collections have been made in coastal shrubland (including Hebe scrub) as well as in shoreline habitats and on open, disturbed slopes.
