= Placopsis dusenii =

Scientific classification
- Kingdom: Fungi
- Division: Ascomycota
- Class: Lecanoromycetes
- Order: Baeomycetales
- Family: Trapeliaceae
- Genus: Placopsis
- Species: P. dusenii

Binomial name
- Placopsis dusenii I.M.Lamb (1947)

Species of lichen-forming fungus

Placopsis dusenii is a species of lichen-forming fungus in the family Trapeliaceae. It was formally described as a new species in 1947 by Elke Mackenzie. The species epithet honours the Swedish botanist Per Karl Hjalmar Dusén, who collected the type specimen in 1896 from Desolación Island.

It is a crust-forming lichen with a thick, chalky, firmly attached thallus that is distinctly areolate and lacks a marginal prothallus. The areoles are angular to irregular and fairly coarse (about 0.5–4.5 mm across), separated by deep, open cracks (roughly 0.2–1.0 mm wide) so that, under a hand lens, the thallus can look like a set of discrete "islands". Individual areoles have a characteristic minutely brain-like (cerebriform) surface texture. The upper surface is greenish white to pinkish, and the lichen lacks isidia and soredia (and is also reported without pustules or pruina).

The species forms cephalodia that may be attached to the areoles or occur as discrete patches separated by cracks. They are pale pinkish when dry but become purplish when wet, and they sit level with the thallus surface or only slightly rise above it. Apothecia are scattered and rather rare, ranging from somewhat immersed to more or less sessile, typically about 0.5–1.0 mm across, occurring singly or in small groups (up to four or five together). It is as an austral lichen that is still only rarely collected in southern Chile, and it is also reported from southern New Zealand, Campbell Island and the Îles Kerguelen. Chilean material comes from moorland habitats in the XI Región, including Puerto Island (Península Swett) and another moorland site with scattered rocky outcrops east of Punta Brown/Punta Charrúa.
