= Placopsis fusciduloides =

Scientific classification
- Kingdom: Fungi
- Division: Ascomycota
- Class: Lecanoromycetes
- Order: Baeomycetales
- Family: Trapeliaceae
- Genus: Placopsis
- Species: P. fusciduloides

Binomial name
- Placopsis fusciduloides D.J.Galloway (2005)

Species of lichen-forming fungus

Placopsis fusciduloides is a species of lichen in the family Trapeliaceae. It was described by David J. Galloway from New Zealand, after he recognised that some specimens filed under other names (especially P. gelida) represented an undescribed taxon; additional material was later matched to the same species from British Columbia (Canada) and Bolivia. It was subsequently documented from Chile and Argentina in southern South America.

== Description ==
The lichen forms neat, flat rosettes closely attached to rock, usually 1–3 cm across but sometimes larger, and it can become thicker and more swollen when it spreads over mosses. The upper surface is typically olive- to brown-toned and appears faintly "frosted" because it is evenly dusted with a thin, powdery (pruina). It is sorediate, producing pale greenish-white to white, powdery propagules (soredia) in round to irregular patches (soralia); these often erode and merge, leaving conspicuous pale, excavated areas edged by a narrow raised rim. Many thalli also develop scattered cephalodia (small, wart-like structures housing cyanobacteria, usually Scytonema), which are smooth when young but become ridged and cracked with age. Sexual fruiting bodies are uncommon but distinctive when present: small, sessile apothecia with a rose-pink to reddish disc, sometimes dusted with a pale pruina. Chemical tests and thin-layer chromatography show that it produces several lichen substances, dominated by gyrophoric acid and usually also cryptostictic acid; smaller amounts of lecanoric acid are present, along with trace to minor quantities of hiascic acid and 5-O-methylhiascic acid, and occasionally 2'-O-methylhiascic, stictic, and connorstictic acids.

It can be separated from lookalikes that have been lumped into P. gelida in the Southern Hemisphere by its consistently pruinose ("frosted") upper surface, the presence of well-defined soralia with pale soredia, and its tendency to develop multiple, scattered cephalodia rather than a single, strictly central one; it also has a more complex set of lichen substances than several related sorediate taxa.

== Habitat and distribution ==
In New Zealand, P. fusciduloides is a mostly alpine species recorded from subalpine to high-alpine sites, ranging from Mount Taranaki in the North Island south to near Borland Saddle in the South Island, at roughly 610–2,000 m elevation. It typically grows in exposed upland habitats on rock outcrops, peaty soil, or mossy ground in open subalpine grassland and alpine herbfield. In southern South America, however, it also occurs at much lower elevations (about 30–1,000 m), where it has been found on coastal rocks and on inland rock surfaces in scrub and grassland.
