= Placopsis rhodocarpa =

Scientific classification
- Kingdom: Fungi
- Division: Ascomycota
- Class: Lecanoromycetes
- Order: Baeomycetales
- Family: Trapeliaceae
- Genus: Placopsis
- Species: P. rhodocarpa

Binomial name
- Placopsis rhodocarpa (Nyl.) Nyl. (1861)

Synonyms
- Squamaria rhodocarpa Nyl. (1861); Lecanora rhodocarpa (Nyl.) Nyl. (1891); Placodium rhodocarpum (Nyl.) Müll.Arg. (1894); Placopsis parellina var. rhodocarpa (Nyl.) I.M.Lamb (1940)

Species of lichen-forming fungus

Placopsis rhodocarpa is a species of lichen-forming fungus in the family Trapeliaceae. It forms radiating, rosette-like crusts on rock and clayey soil, coloured dark green to pale greenish or whitish, and produces small granular soredia (powdery reproductive structures) as well as flat, pinkish cyanobacteria-containing structures. When fertile, the lichen bears fruiting bodies with rose-pink to red-brown discs and conspicuously thickened rims. The species has a Southern Hemisphere distribution, recorded from Ecuador and Bolivia southward into Chile, and also from Australia and New Zealand.

== Taxonomy ==
Placopsis rhodocarpa was introduced by William Nylander in 1861, when he described it as Squamaria rhodocarpa from alpine rock in the Andes (at Morne de Pocara, about 3,100 m elevation). In the original description he characterised the species as a pale, firmly attached crust that becomes uneven and slightly warted towards the centre but breaks into radiating fissures at the margin, with scattered flesh-coloured cephalodia and medium-sized, red to brick-red apothecia edged by an intact thalline rim. He also recorded oblong to broadly ellipsoid ascospores and an iodine-induced blue staining reaction of the hymenium.

Major nomenclatural databases do not agree on the author citation for the current name. Nylander described the species in 1861 as Squamaria rhodocarpa and, in the same paper, introduced the name Placopsis and referred to the species as Placopsis rhodocarpa. Subsequently, some modern treatments cite the name as Placopsis rhodocarpa (Nyl.) Nyl. Index Fungorum and Species Fungorum instead cite the transfer to Placopsis from a later source (1867) and attribute the combination to Lindsay as Placopsis rhodocarpa (Nyl.) Linds. Wetmore later published the same combination in 1963, but this is treated as an isonym rather than a separate name.

== Description ==
Placopsis rhodocarpa is a crustose lichen that typically forms a rosette-like, radiating thallus (placodioid), coloured dark green to pale greenish or whitish. It develops small, scattered, small and rounded soralia that produce granular green soredia. Flat, pink cephalodia (structures that contain the cyanobacterial partner) are also produced; these are often delicately wrinkled or folded and may split into fine radial cracks. When fertile, the lichen has scattered apothecia (fruiting bodies) with a thick thalline rim somewhat resembling those of Ochrolechia; the disc is rose-pink to red-brown and lacks pruina. The ascospores are ellipsoid, typically 18–20 × 6.5–10 μm but occasionally as small as 16.5 μm in length.

== Habitat and distribution ==
The species is variable, with the overall form changing with substrate (clayey soil versus rock) and with how exposed the site is to sunshine. It is an austral (southern) lichen, recorded from Ecuador and Bolivia southwards into Chile (including the Biobío Region), and also from Australia and New Zealand. It was first documented from the Juan Fernández Islands in 2010, based on collections from Alejandro Selkirk Island at about 1,000–1,300 m elevation, in heath and grassland where the fern Lophosoria occurs scattered among the vegetation.
