= Placopsis roivainenii =

Scientific classification
- Kingdom: Fungi
- Division: Ascomycota
- Class: Lecanoromycetes
- Order: Baeomycetales
- Family: Trapeliaceae
- Genus: Placopsis
- Species: P. roivainenii

Binomial name
- Placopsis roivainenii I.M.Lamb (1947)

Species of lichen-forming fungus

Placopsis roivainenii is a species of lichen-forming fungus in the family Trapeliaceae. It was formally described as a new species in 1947 by Elke Mackenzie. The species epithet refers to the Finnish botanist Heikki Roivainen, who collected the type specimen from sandy soil in Tierra del Fuego in 1929.

Placopsis roivainenii is a crustose lichen that grows as a firm, chalky (tartareous) rosette, typically about 0.5–1 mm thick. Its outer edge is neatly pleated and irregularly shaped (a plicate-effigurate margin) and is usually more or less continuous, though it may be crossed by narrow cracks. These fissures do not break the margin into separate lobes. Towards the centre the thallus becomes distinctly areolate, with the areoles sharply cut off by deep, often gaping cracks. The upper surface is pale grey-white and mostly smooth and continuous, but under a hand lens it can be patchily minutely roughened (scabrid) and sprinkled with fine white pruina that may glisten in the light.

The lichen produces sparse but often large central cephalodia (about 1–9 mm across) that are radiately pleated. They may occur as arcs or rings, and older cephalodia can be partly overgrown again by thallus tissue. Apothecia are scattered and sessile, with a thick, inrolled thalline rim and a pale pinkish to red-brown disc that commonly becomes deeply and irregularly fissured, minutely roughened-papillate, and thinly buff-pruinose. Microscopically, it has a colourless hymenium about 180–225 μm tall, ellipsoid ascospores around 18–20 × 9–10.5 μm, and curved, thread-like conidia about 18–24 × 0.5 μm.

Placopsis roivainenii is known from southern Chile and adjacent Argentina, where it grows on sandy soil and on rock, with most records from coastal localities between about 40°S and 55°S. One documented site is a moorland ridge on the Swett Peninsula.
