= Placopsis gelidoides =

Scientific classification
- Kingdom: Fungi
- Division: Ascomycota
- Class: Lecanoromycetes
- Order: Baeomycetales
- Family: Trapeliaceae
- Genus: Placopsis
- Species: P. gelidoides

Binomial name
- Placopsis gelidoides Du Rietz ex I.M.Lamb (1947)

Species of lichen-forming fungus

Placopsis gelidoides is a species of lichen-forming fungus in the family Trapeliaceae. It was first described scientifically by Elke Mackenzie, from specimens collected by Gustaf Einar Du Rietz in New Zealand. It is a crustose lichen whose thallus breaks into convex, blocky patches (areoles) that often line up in short, parallel rows. The fruiting bodies (apothecia) are conspicuous because their thallus-coloured rim is very thick, smooth, and swollen, making the central disc look slightly "set in". The disc itself is usually brown and commonly becomes deeply cracked with age. In section, the spore-bearing layer (the hymenium) is pale pinkish to pale yellowish-brown and somewhat cloudy in appearance, and it is tall for a crustose lichen (about 175–200 μm). The ascospores are ellipsoid and sit in a single row within each ascus; they usually contain a few large internal spaces (lumina) and are about 15–20 μm long by 8–11.5 μm wide. The asexual propagules (conidia) are very slender, thread-like, and slightly curved, around 16–20 × 0.5 μm.

Previously treated as a New Zealand endemic, it is now understood as an austral, alpine species that is only rarely collected, with its ecology still poorly understood in both New Zealand and southern Chile. It was reported there from Chile's IX Region (Parque Nacional Nahuelbuta) and from the XI Region (Parque Nacional Tamango, near Cochrane, at about 400 m elevation). Chemically, it is reported to contain 5-O-methylhiascic acid as the main lichen product, with gyrophoric acid also present in substantial amounts, and smaller amounts of lecanoric and hiascic acids.
