= Placopsis pycnotheca =

Scientific classification
- Kingdom: Fungi
- Division: Ascomycota
- Class: Lecanoromycetes
- Order: Baeomycetales
- Family: Trapeliaceae
- Genus: Placopsis
- Species: P. pycnotheca

Binomial name
- Placopsis pycnotheca I.M.Lamb ex Räsänen (1939)

Species of lichen-forming fungus

Placopsis pycnotheca is a species of lichen-forming fungus in the family Trapeliaceae. It was first proposed by Elke Mackenzie but was not validly published until Veli Räsänen formally published the name in 1939.

== Description ==
Placopsis pycnotheca is a crust-forming lichen that spreads as a low, uneven thallus made up of swollen warts or small squamules, typically coating sand, soil, and small pebbles rather than forming a clean-edged rosette. It produces simple isidia that range from rounded, pinhead-like outgrowths to short, finger-like projections. The apothecia are scattered and often look slightly stalked at the base. They have a thick, swollen thalline margin, while the disc is pale to dark red-brown and tends to become papillate or irregularly cracked with age. Microscopically, it has elongate-ellipsoid ascospores, typically 18–24 × 7–9 μm but occasionally as small as 15 × 6 μm or as large as 10 μm wide, and thread-like conidia around 16–20 × 0.5 μm.

== Habitat and distribution ==
In southern South America, the species is known from Argentina and from Chile (reported from the VII to XII regions), and the source reports it for the first time from the Juan Fernández Archipelago. Chilean collections cited include material from Alejandro Selkirk Island (around Correspondencia Torres, about 1,360 m elevation) and from Robinson Crusoe Island (Tres Puntas, about 200 m). A further Chilean record is from the XI Region, where it was collected in moorland on a ridge at Puerto Island on the Swett Peninsula.
