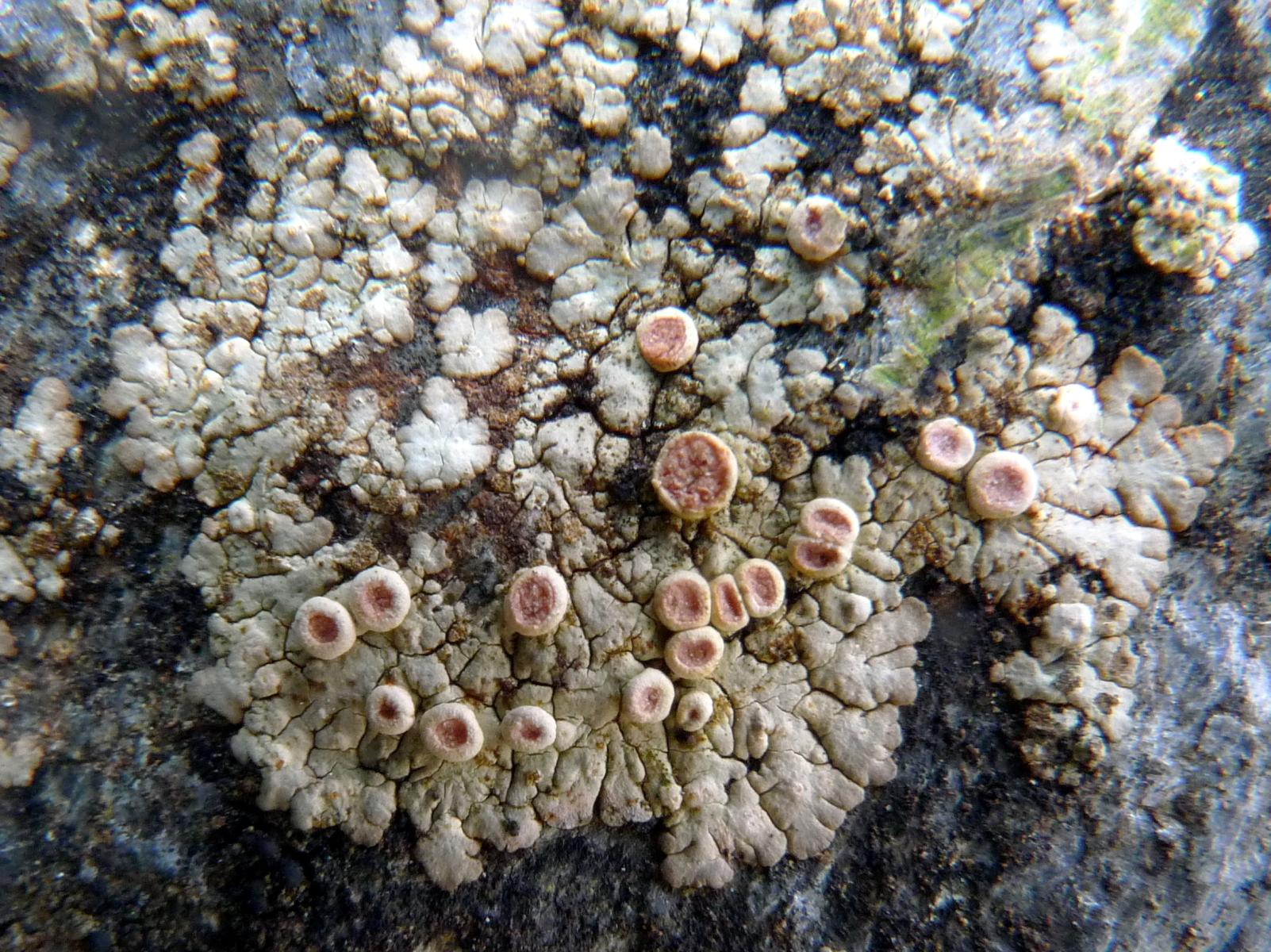

Scientific classification
- Kingdom: Fungi
- Division: Ascomycota
- Class: Lecanoromycetes
- Order: Baeomycetales
- Family: Trapeliaceae
- Genus: Placopsis
- Species: P. lambii

Binomial name
- Placopsis lambii Hertel & V.Wirth (1987)

Synonyms
- Squamaria gelida f. dispersa Cromb. (1873)

= Placopsis lambii =

Species of lichen

Placopsis lambii is a species of saxicolous (rock-dwelling), crustose lichen in the family Trapeliaceae. It was formally described as a new species in 1987 by lichenologists Hannes Hertel and Volkmar Wirth. The species epithet lambii honours polar explorer and lichenologist Elke Mackenzie (formerly Lamb). In North America, one vernacular name for the lichen is pink bull's-eye lichen.

Placopsis lambii is distinguished by its placodioid thallus that features deeply notched and radiating edge lobes, a glossy upper surface, typically dark and somewhat rounded soralia, and non-lobate cephalodia that may be absent in certain samples. This species predominantly produces 5-O-methylhiascic and gyrophoric acids.

Placopsis lambii has a widespread but scattered distribution. It has been recorded from many countries in Europe, Africa (Kenya, Lesotho, and Tanzania), South America (Bolivia, Chile), Central America (Costa Rica, Ecuador), New Zealand, and Asian Russia.
