= Placopsis imshaugii =

Scientific classification
- Kingdom: Fungi
- Division: Ascomycota
- Class: Lecanoromycetes
- Order: Baeomycetales
- Family: Trapeliaceae
- Genus: Placopsis
- Species: P. imshaugii

Binomial name
- Placopsis imshaugii D.J.Galloway (2011)

Species of lichen

Placopsis imshaugii is a species of lichen in the family Trapeliaceae. Known from Chile, it was described as new to science in 2011. It is characterised by its distinctive rust-coloured thallus and unique morphology.

== Taxonomy ==
David J.Galloway described Placopsis imshaugii as a new species in honour of the American lichenologist Henry Andrew Imshaug, who made contributions to the study of lichens in South America. The type specimen was collected in October 1969 at Desolación Island, a treeless anchoridge in the Fondeadero Nassau region of Chile.

== Description ==
Placopsis imshaugii is characterized by its closely attached, rosette-forming thallus without a marginal prothallus. The grey-brown to pinkish-brown marginal zone contrasts with the orange-brown or rust-brown upper surface found centrally. The species lacks isidia, maculae, pruina, pseudocyphellae and soredia. The apothecia are aspicilioid at first, eventually becoming somewhat thelotremoid, often with a prominent thalline margin obscuring the disc. The hymenium measures 200–300 μm in height, with cylindrical asci measuring 200–250 by 8–10 μm. The broadly ellipsoidal ascospores are typically 25–30 by 15–18 μm in size, while the filiform (threadlike) conidia measure 27–32.5 by 1 μm. The principal secondary metabolite is gyrophoric acid, accompanied by traces of lecanoric acid and atranorin.

=== Similar species ===
Placopsis imshaugii can be distinguished from other rust-coloured species such as Placopsis baculigera, Placopsis bicolor, Placopsis elixii, and Placopsis lateritioides by differences in thallus morphology, hymenium height, ascospore size, conidia dimensions, and secondary metabolite composition. Each of these species exhibits unique characteristics, such as the presence of white effigurate (with a defined form) maculae in P. baculigera, the orange-yellow to red-brown convex lobes in P. bicolor, the white laminal pseudocyphellae in P. elixii, and the grey-blue scattered laminal soralia in P. lateritioides. Additionally, the chemistry of these species varies, helping to distinguish them from Placopsis imshaugii.

== Habitat and distribution ==
Placopsis imshaugii is currently known only from several remote coastal sites in Region XII of western Patagonia, Chile. It colonises hard siliceous rocks on scattered outcrops on ridges and open hillsides, occasionally associating with Aspicilia sp., Placopsis gelida, and rust-coloured species of Porpidia.
