= Placopsis fuscidula =

Scientific classification
- Kingdom: Fungi
- Division: Ascomycota
- Class: Lecanoromycetes
- Order: Baeomycetales
- Family: Trapeliaceae
- Genus: Placopsis
- Species: P. fuscidula

Binomial name
- Placopsis fuscidula I.M.Lamb ex Räsänen (1939)

Species of lichen-forming fungus

Placopsis fuscidula is a species of lichen-forming fungus in the family Trapeliaceae. It was first proposed by Elke Mackenzie but was not validly published until Veli Räsänen formally published the name in 1939.

== Description ==
Placopsis fuscidula is a tightly attached, crustose lichen that usually starts as a roughly circular patch and can spread into broader, irregular thalli about 2–7 cm across. It lacks a distinct marginal prothallus, but the edge is formed by slightly swollen to flattened marginal lobes. When wet, the upper surface is pale greenish-white to olive. When dry it becomes cream to ivory, sometimes with pale brownish-pink or grey-blue tones. The surface is generally smooth and matt (sometimes a little glossy towards the edge) and is often covered by a very fine grey to grey-white pruina, which can give the thallus a faintly velvety look under a hand lens. It does not form isidia, soredia, maculae, or pseudocyphellae. The apothecia are scattered and sit directly on the thallus, usually solitary or in small clusters, about 0.5–2 mm across. Their thallus-coloured rim is thick at first (nearly covering the disc) but tends to become pushed aside as the apothecia mature, and it is smooth and often thinly white-pruinose. The disc starts out concave and later becomes flat to slightly convex. It is pale to dark red-brown, can look translucent when wet, and is smooth to minutely papillate, sometimes with a dusting of fine white pruina.

Microscopically, P. fuscidula has a tall, colourless hymenium, typically 170–200 μm but occasionally ranging from 150 to 225 μm, with ellipsoid ascospores measuring roughly 17.5–22.5 × 9–12.5 μm (occasionally reaching 25 μm in length), and slender, thread-like conidia that are straight to slightly curved, about 17–21 × 0.5–1 μm.

== Habitat and distribution ==
Placopsis fuscidula is an austral species with a scattered Southern Ocean distribution, reported from southern Chile (including the Juan Fernández Archipelago), New Zealand, Tristan da Cunha, and the Îles Kerguelen, with an additional record reported from Venezuela. The Chilean collections cited include high-elevation sites on Juan Fernández (around 1,000–1,300 m, in heath or grassland with scattered plants of Lophosoria) and a record from Desolación Island in mossy forest near the shore.
