= Elliott Passage =

Elliott Passage (67°44′S 68°28′W) is a marine channel running northeast–southwest between the southeast coast of Adelaide Island and Jenny Island. It was named by the UK Antarctic Place-Names Committee in 1984 after Captain Christopher R. Elliott, Master of the RRS John Biscoe from 1975, having also served in other officer positions on the John Biscoe and the RRS Bransfield from 1967.
