= Parmelia lambii =

Scientific classification
- Kingdom: Fungi
- Division: Ascomycota
- Class: Lecanoromycetes
- Order: Lecanorales
- Family: Parmeliaceae
- Genus: Parmelia
- Species: P. lambii

Binomial name
- Parmelia lambii Øvstedal (2009)

Synonyms
- Physcia tabacina Hue (1915)

Species of lichen

Parmelia lambii is a species of foliose lichen in the family Parmeliaceae. It is found in the Antarctic Peninsula. The species was originally described in 1915 from a specimen collected on Jenny Island, but was later recognized as belonging to the genus Parmelia rather than Physcia and given a new name in 2009. This small, dark brown lichen forms narrow leaf-like lobes with tiny white spots and is covered in small wart-like growths, but has only been found in its non-reproductive state.

== Taxonomy ==
The species was first described by Auguste-Marie Hue in 1915 as Physcia tabacina. The type specimen was collected from Jenny Island in Marguerite Bay. Although the specimen was later lost, Elke Mackenzie had examined it and written up an unpublished description in 1959. Based on Mackenzie's detailed description, Dag Olav Øvstedal proposed in 2009 that the specimen actually represented a previously unrecognized species of Parmelia. He considered that the minute punctiform (point-like) pseudocyphellae suggested a position in genus Punctelia, but the presence of atranorin and salazinic acid as lichen products indicated a placement in Parmelia. Because the name Parmelia tabacina had already been published for another taxon, a new name was need, and so Øvstedal honoured Elke Mackenzie (formerly Lamb) in the new specific epithet lambii.

== Description ==
Parmelia lambii forms a small, leaf-like thallus, though the complete size is unknown because the type specimen is fragmented. The lobes are narrow—up to about 6 mm long and 2 mm wide—and branch in an uneven, forked pattern. Their upper surface is dark brown, flat, and dotted with clusters of low, wart-like isidia that inflate slightly towards the tip. Scattered across the lobe surfaces are numerous minute, white, pin-point pseudocyphellae (tiny breaks in the cortex that aid gas exchange). The underside is generally coal-black and faintly wrinkled, fading to brown near the margins, and bears simple black rhizines up to 0.7 mm long that anchor the lichen to its substrate. Younger lobes may show a paler, brownish underside before ageing to black. No apothecia or pycnidia have been observed, so the species is currently known only in its vegetative state.

Microscopically the thallus lacks a distinct upper cortex; instead, a smooth cortex blends directly into medullary hyphae, and no stratification is evident. The associated green alga (photobiont) consists of rounded chlorococcoid cells 8–15 μm in diameter. Standard chemical spot tests are negative, but thin-layer chromatography shows the presence of atranorin and salazinic acid, which are secondary metabolites consistent with placement in Parmelia. The combination of dark brown, isidiate lobes with laminal punctiform pseudocyphellae, a black lower surface, and the salazinic acid chemistry distinguishes P. lambii from similar East Asian species and from superficially alike members of the genus Punctelia.
