= Placopsis parellina =

Scientific classification
- Kingdom: Fungi
- Division: Ascomycota
- Class: Lecanoromycetes
- Order: Baeomycetales
- Family: Trapeliaceae
- Genus: Placopsis
- Species: P. parellina

Binomial name
- Placopsis parellina (Nyl.) I.M.Lamb (1940)

Synonyms
- Lecanora parellina Nyl. (1855); Placopsis parellina f. microphylla I.M.Lamb (1947); Placopsis microphylla (I.M.Lamb) D.J.Galloway (2002)

Species of lichen-forming fungus

Placopsis parellina is a species of lichen-forming fungus in the family Trapeliaceae. It grows on soil and rocks, forming small, spreading patches made up of tightly packed scale-like lobes, and bears dark cyanobacteria-containing structures scattered across its surface. The fruiting bodies have a conspicuously swollen rim and a pale to dark reddish-brown disc. The species has a Southern Hemisphere distribution, occurring from Ecuador southward through the Andes to southern Chile, with additional populations in the Australia–New Zealand region and an isolated record from Java.

== Taxonomy ==
It was described by William Nylander in 1855 as Lecanora parellina, based on material growing on clay soil and characterised by a grey-white, granular crust with small, flat, brick-coloured apothecia set in a thick thalline margin. He reported 8-spored cylindrical asci with ellipsoid spores about 21–24 × 11–12 μm and an iodine-positive (blue-staining) hymenium, and contrasted it with Lecanora parella (now Ochrolechia parella) by its smaller spores and much longer, needle-like conidia. Elke Mackenzie reclassified it in Placopsis in 1940.

== Description ==
Placopsis parellina is a small, spreading lichen that forms a low, patchy thallus made of thickened, tightly packed squamules. On soil the squamules tend to overlap like roof-tiles, while on rock the thallus is usually flatter and more clearly rosette-forming. It does not produce isidia or soredia. Darker, cyanobacteria-containing cephalodia are typically scattered across the thallus as flattened to low-domed structures about 0.5–1.2 mm across. Their surface texture may range from finely ridged to smooth, and they can be so closely set that they appear almost immersed among the thalline squamules.

The lichen forms sessile apothecia about (0.2–)0.5–2(–2.5) mm wide, with a conspicuously swollen, thallus-coloured rim reminiscent of some species of Ochrolechia. The disc is pale to dark red-brown, sometimes deepening to brown-black, and lacks pruina. Microscopically, the spore-bearing layer (the hymenium) is colourless and about 200–240 μm tall, and the colourless ascospores are broadly ellipsoid, about 16–20(–25) × (8.5–)10–15 μm.

== Habitat and distribution ==
In southern South America, P. parellina is endemic, known from Ecuador southwards into southern Chile, and it was recorded for the first time from the Juan Fernández Archipelago in 2010. In a 1947 monograph on Placopsis, Mackenzie treated the species as having a "bicentric" Southern Hemisphere distribution, with a main range in South America and a second centre in the Australia–New Zealand region; she also mentioned an isolated high-altitude record from Java and noted that it occurs northwards along the Andes to Bolivia, where it grows on soil and rocks, often forming clusters of patches that merge.
