= Placopsis perrugosa =

Scientific classification
- Kingdom: Fungi
- Division: Ascomycota
- Class: Lecanoromycetes
- Order: Baeomycetales
- Family: Trapeliaceae
- Genus: Placopsis
- Species: P. perrugosa

Binomial name
- Placopsis perrugosa (Nyl.) Nyl. (1867)

Synonyms
- Lecanora perrugosa Nyl. (1867); Placodium perrugosum (Nyl.) Müll.Arg. (1889); Squamaria perrugosa Nyl. (1875)

Species of lichen

Placopsis perrugosa is a saxicolous (rock-dwelling), placodioid lichen in the family Trapeliaceae. It was formally described as a new species in 1867 by Finnish lichenologist William Nylander, originally as a member of the genus Lecanora.

After the retreat of the Glaciar Frías in the Patagonian Andes, Argentina, Placopsis perrugosa dominated the pioneer stage on newly exposed rock outcrops. This was followed by a mid-successional stage, in which a lichen-moss mat was dominated by the moss Racomitrium lanuginosum, providing the foundation for a larger diversity of vascular plants in the final successional stage. Like other members of genus Placopsis, P. perrugosa is a fast-growing crustose lichen; this allows them to dominate as early colonisers on snow-free moraines of exposed land surfaces.
