= Coppinsia =

Scientific classification
- Domain: Eukaryota
- Kingdom: Fungi
- Division: Ascomycota
- Class: Lecanoromycetes
- Order: Baeomycetales
- Family: Trapeliaceae
- Genus: Coppinsia; Lumbsch & Heibel (1998)
- Species: C. minutissima

Binomial name
- Coppinsia minutissima Lumbsch & Heibel (1998)

Genus of lichen-forming fungi

Coppinsia is a fungal genus in the family Trapeliaceae. It is a monotypic genus, containing the single species Coppinsia minutissima, a lichen. This extremely small lichen forms an almost invisible, paint-thin crust on contaminated soil and produces tiny orange-pink fruiting bodies just 0.2–0.6 mm across. It specializes in growing on heavy metal-polluted sites such as abandoned lead mines and spoil heaps, where few other lichens can survive.

== Taxonomy ==
Coppinsia was erected in 1998 by H. Thorsten Lumbsch and Esther Heibel to accommodate a minute soil- and bryophyte-dwelling lichen that could not be placed satisfactorily in any previously circumscribed genus. The material had been sent to Lumbsch by the British lichenologist Brian John Coppins—who had provisionally labelled it "Trapelia vezdaeoides"—during a systematic review of the suborder Agyriineae. Formal publication recognised the distinctive combination of a thallus consisting only of an algal layer topped by an epinecral film, extremely small biatorine apothecia with a cup-like but often greatly reduced hyaline exciple, unbranched or only slightly branched paraphyses, a Trapelia-type ascus and simple ovoid ascospores. The holotype was collected from metalliferous spoil at Esgair Fraith Mine, Cardiganshire, Wales, on 22 March 1993.

Morphologically, Coppinsia shows affinities to Trapelia—both share a Trapelia-type ascus, sparsely branched paraphyses and one-celled spores—but it differs in its reduced, hyaline true exciple and in lacking both cortex and medulla in the vegetative body. It also diverges from Anzina, Agyrium and Amylora, which either possess annular or carbonised exciples, stratified thalli or multicellular, halonate spores. Because these distinctions fall within character suites traditionally used to delimit genera in the Agyriaceae, Lumbsch and Heibel considered the material generically isolated and erected Coppinsia to preserve taxonomic clarity. No DNA sequence data were available at the time of description, and the phylogenetic position of the genus within the family therefore rests on morphological evidence alone. The generic name honours Coppins for his wide-ranging contributions to British lichenology, while the specific epithet minutissima (Latin for 'smallest') refers to the lichen's almost imperceptible thallus and tiny apothecia.

== Description ==
Coppinsia minutissima forms an exceedingly thin, crust-like thallus that sits flush against its substrate like a coat of paint. Where visible, the thallus appears greenish-grey, but it often manifests only as a faint discolouration of the bark or rock it grows on. Its upper surface is protected by a delicate epinecral layer—a film of dead fungal cells that helps reduce water loss—yet it lacks the more robust cortex and inner medulla that many lichens possess. The photosynthetic partner (photobiont) consists of tiny, spherical green algae (a chlorococcoid alga). No dark prothallus line surrounds the colony, and thin-layer chromatography has detected no characteristic lichen products.

The reproductive structures are minute, stalkless apothecia just 0.2–0.6 mm across. They are biatorine, meaning the disc and its rim are the same pale orange-to-pinkish colour and the margin is not blackened or greyed with protective pigments. Inside, the true exciple—a cup of intertwined, colourless hyphae—is up to 25 micrometres (μm) thick in young apothecia but becomes inconspicuous with age. The hymenium, a clear layer 120–160 μm tall, contains slender paraphyses (1.5–2.5 μm wide) that remain unbranched or only slightly branched and thicken only marginally at their tips. Asci are Trapelia-type cylinders (110–140 × 15–22 μm) that stain only faintly bluish in iodine and show a tube-shaped amyloid structure in the apex (tholus). Each ascus produces eight single-celled, colourless ascospores that are ovoid and measure 12–18 × 7–9.5 μm. No asexual fruiting bodies (conidiomata) have been observed.

== Habitat and distribution ==
Coppinsia minutissima grows on bare or lightly vegetated ground in sites where heavy metals hinder most other lichens. It forms a thin film on mineral soil, decaying mosses, dying lichen thalli and fine plant detritus in and around abandoned lead mines, metal-rich spoil heaps and railway embankments. Because the thallus is almost invisible, the species is probably under-recorded.

Verified records come from south-west England, with additional occurrences in West Sussex, East Suffolk, the Scottish Highlands and western Wales. At these localities C. minutissima frequently co-occurs with the diminutive metal-tolerant lichens Vezdaea acicularis and V. cobria.
