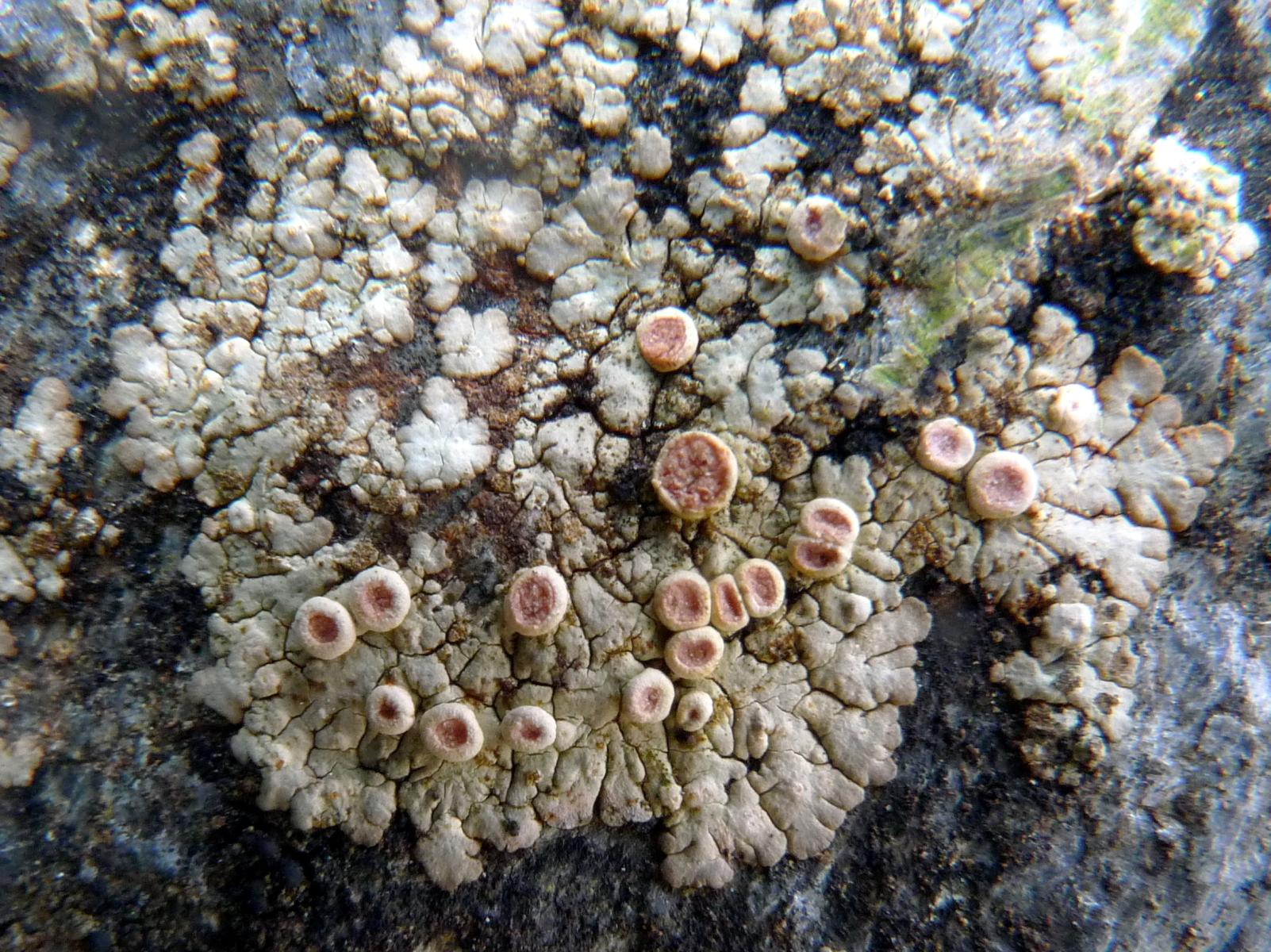
- Placopsis lambii

Scientific classification
- Kingdom: Fungi
- Division: Ascomycota
- Class: Lecanoromycetes
- Order: Baeomycetales
- Family: Trapeliaceae
- Genus: Placopsis (Nyl.) Linds. (1866)

Type species
- Placopsis gelida (L.) Linds. (1866)

Synonyms
- Squamarina subgen. Placopsis Nyl. (1861)

= Placopsis =

Genus of lichen-forming fungi

Placopsis is a genus of lichen-forming fungi in the family Trapeliaceae. First introduced as a subgenus in 1861 by William Nylander, the genus now comprises about 50 named species worldwide and shows its greatest diversity in the Southern Hemisphere. These lichens are conspicuous crustose to placodioid forms that typically grow on rock or soil, characterised by orbicular or irregularly spreading patches with lobed margins. A defining feature of the genus is the presence of cephalodia, which are nodules containing cyanobacteria that are often centrally placed on the thallus. This distinctive appearance inspired the common name 'bull's-eye lichens' for some North American species.

== Taxonomy ==
Placopsis was introduced by William Nylander in 1861 as a subgenus for the species Squamaria gelida and S. rhodocarpa. Nylander had earlier placed taxa now treated in Placopsis in the genera Lecanora and Squamaria, and he later wavered between treating Placopsis as an independent genus or as a subgenus of Lecanora. William Lauder Lindsay was an early adopter of genus rank, but many nineteenth- and early twentieth-century lichenologists continued to maintain Placopsis as a section or subgenus of Lecanora (or sometimes within Placodium). By the early twentieth century it was more widely accepted as a separate genus, and Elke Mackenzie's 1947 monograph became the main foundation for later taxonomic discussions of the group.

In David Galloway's 2013 treatment of the genus, Placopsis comprises about 52 named species worldwide and is most diverse in the Southern Hemisphere. In North America some members are called "bull's-eye lichens", a vernacular name referring to their often centrally placed cephalodia.

The higher-level classification of Placopsis has also shifted. The genus has been placed at different times in Trapeliaceae and Pertusariaceae, and later in Agyriaceae; subsequent molecular studies rejected a broadly defined Agyriaceae and supported reinstating Trapeliaceae for Placopsis and related genera, alongside the establishment of the order Trapeliales to accommodate that family. Molecular work also indicated that the lichen previously treated as Placopsis macrophthalma is more closely allied to Orceolina than to Placopsis, and it has therefore been treated as the single species of the resurrected genus Aspiciliopsis.

== Description ==
Species of Placopsis are conspicuous crustose to placodioid lichens that usually grow on rock or soil, and only rarely on dust-impregnated wood. The thallus (lichen body) often forms an orbicular or irregularly spreading patch with a lobed margin and a more firmly crustose centre that may be cracked or broken into areoles. In some species the thallus is made up of small squamules, especially towards the margins. Several species also develop a dark prothallus: a brown-black border that extends beyond the thallus edge and lacks photosynthetic tissue. Thallus colour is variable and can look quite different when moist versus dry. Cephalodia (nodules that house cyanobacteria) are a defining feature of the genus and are usually conspicuous, though they may be sparse or absent in some material. They may be immersed in the thallus or sit on its surface, and in some species can later be partly overgrown by thallus tissue and even develop apothecia (fruiting bodies).

The primary photosynthetic partner (photobiont) in Placopsis is a green, chlorococcoid alga, while the cephalodia contain cyanobacteria of several types. Some species also reproduce vegetatively by forming isidia (small outgrowths) or soredia (powdery granules) produced in soralia. Other surface characters used in identification include maculae (pale, photobiont-free patches giving a marbled look), pseudocyphellae (small pores), and pruina (a frost-like dusting). Sexual reproduction occurs in apothecia that are typically zeorine in form, with both a thalline rim and a distinct proper margin. Apothecia are usually sessile but may be partly immersed, and the disc often shifts from concave to flatter or convex with age, with colours ranging from pinks and reds through browns to almost black. Pycnidia (asexual fruiting bodies) are common in the genus and produce thread-like conidia. Microscopically, asci are Trapelia-type and usually bear eight simple, colourless spores. The secondary chemistry of Placopsis is relatively uniform, with gyrophoric acid frequent, alongside a broader set of depsides, depsidones, anthraquinones and other compounds; some taxa show acid-deficient chemotypes.

== Species ==
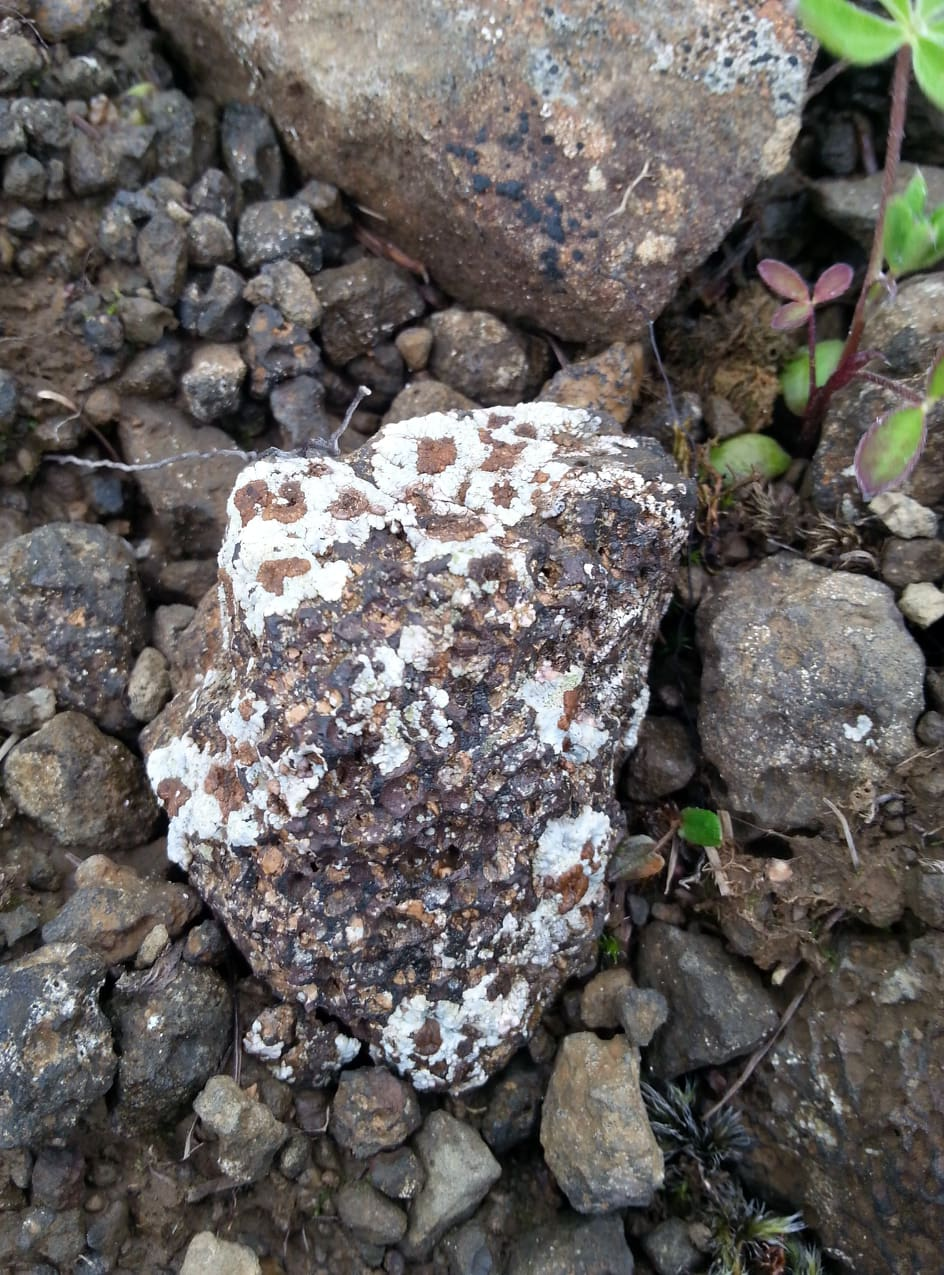
Placopsis gelida in Iceland

As of January 2026, Species Fungorum (via the Catalog of Life) accepts 41 species of Placopsis.

- Placopsis alphoplacoides I.M.Lamb (1947) – New Zealand
- Placopsis amabilis B.de Lesd. (1933)
- Placopsis ampliata (I.M.Lamb) D.J.Galloway (2004)
- Placopsis antarctica D.J.Galloway, R.I.L.Sm. & Quilhot (2005)
- Placopsis asahinae I.M.Lamb (1947) – Taiwan
- Placopsis aspicilioides D.J.Galloway (2004)
- Placopsis auriculata Lumbsch & Kashiw. (1993)
- Placopsis baculigera I.M.Lamb (1947)
- Placopsis bicolor (Tuck.) B.de Lesd. (1931)
- Placopsis brachyloba (Müll.Arg.) I.M.Lamb (1947)
- Placopsis brevilobata (Zahlbr.) I.M.Lamb (1947)
- Placopsis campbelliana Imshaug ex D.J.Galloway (2013)
- Placopsis centrifuga D.J.Galloway (2004)
- Placopsis chilena I.M.Lamb (1947)
- Placopsis clavifera (I.M.Lamb) D.J.Galloway (2001)
- Placopsis contortuplicata I.M.Lamb (1947)
- Placopsis craterifera Boluda (2024) – Tanzania
- Placopsis cribellans (Nyl.) Räsänen (1940)
- Placopsis dennanensis (Zahlbr.) I.M.Lamb ex D.J.Galloway (2001)
- Placopsis durietziorum D.J.Galloway (2004)
- Placopsis dusenii I.M.Lamb (1947)
- Placopsis effusa I.M.Lamb (1947)
- Placopsis elixii D.J.Galloway (2001)
- Placopsis erosa D.J.Galloway (2013)
- Placopsis fuscidula I.M.Lamb ex Räsänen (1939)
- Placopsis fusciduloides D.J.Galloway (2005)
- Placopsis gelida (L.) Linds. (1866)
- Placopsis gelidoides Du Rietz ex I.M.Lamb (1947)
- Placopsis hertelii D.J.Galloway (2004)
- Placopsis illita (C.Knight) I.M.Lamb (1947)
- Placopsis imshaugii D.J.Galloway (2011)
- Placopsis lambii Hertel & V.Wirth (1987)
- Placopsis lateritioides I.M.Lamb (1947)
- Placopsis macrospora D.J.Galloway (2004)
- Placopsis murrayi D.J.Galloway (2004)
- Placopsis parellina (Nyl.) I.M.Lamb (1940)
- Placopsis patagonica (Zahlbr.) I.M.Lamb (1947)
- Placopsis perrugosa (Nyl.) Nyl. (1867)
- Placopsis polycarpa D.J.Galloway (2004)
- Placopsis pruinosa D.J.Galloway (2004)
- Placopsis pycnotheca I.M.Lamb ex Räsänen (1939)
- Placopsis rhodocarpa (Nyl.) Nyl. (1861)
- Placopsis rhodophthalma (Müll.Arg.) Räsänen (1932)
- Placopsis roivainenii I.M.Lamb (1947)
- Placopsis stellata (Øvstedal) Henssen (2003)
- Placopsis stenophylla (Hue) I.M.Lamb (1947)
- Placopsis subgelida (Nyl.) Nyl. (1888)
- Placopsis subcribellans (I.M.Lamb) D.J.Galloway (2002)
- Placopsis venosa Imshaug ex D.J.Galloway (2004)
