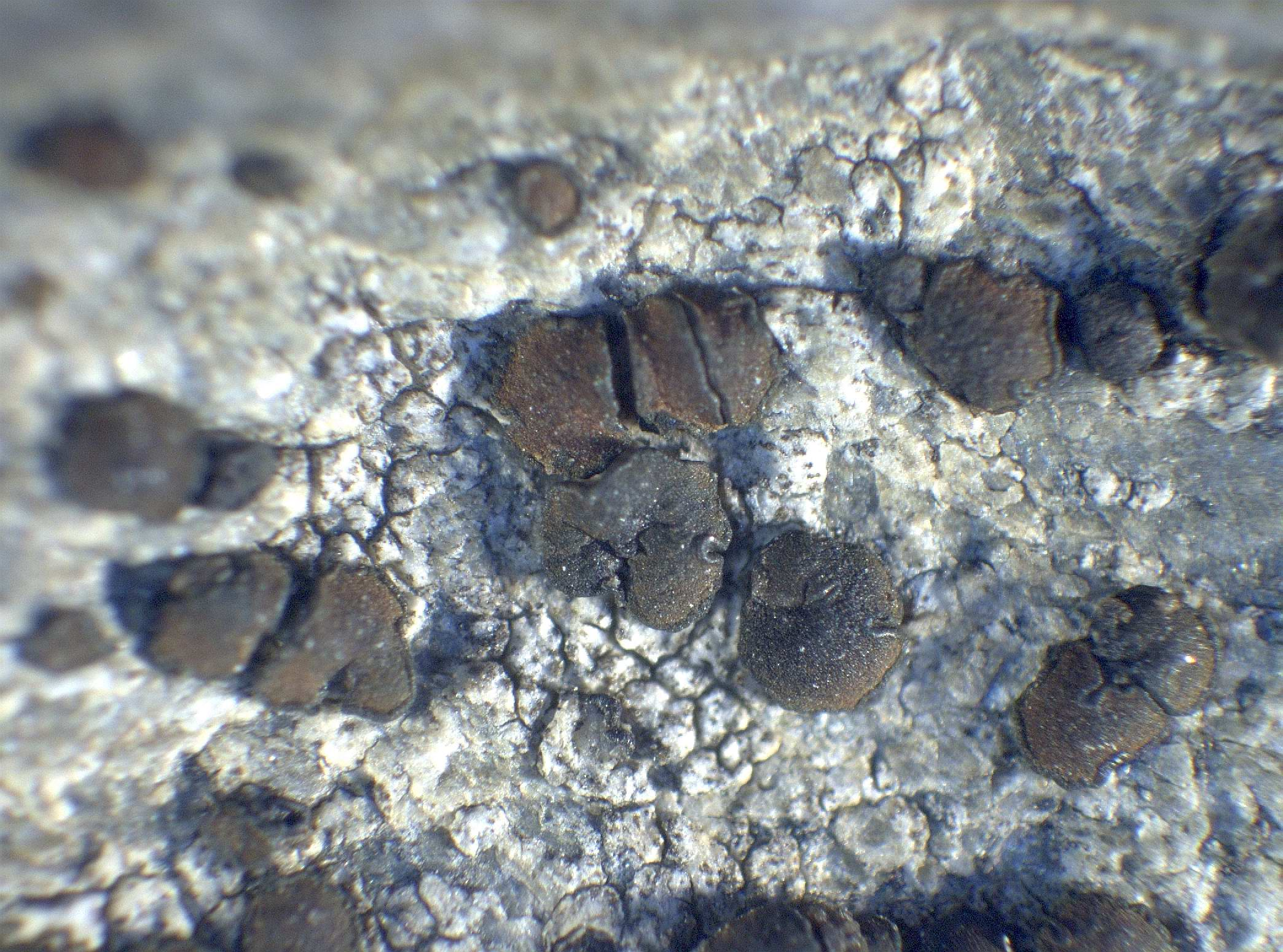

Scientific classification
- Kingdom: Fungi
- Division: Ascomycota
- Class: Lecanoromycetes
- Order: Teloschistales
- Family: Teloschistaceae
- Genus: Lendemeriella
- Species: L. exsecuta

Binomial name
- Lendemeriella exsecuta (Nyl.) S.Y.Kondr. (2020)

Synonyms
- Lecanora exsecuta Nyl. (1880); Callopisma exsecutum (Nyl.) Arnold (1886); Caloplaca exsecuta (Nyl.) Dalla Torre & Sarnth. (1902); Caloplaca nigricans var. exsecuta (Nyl.) H.Olivier (1909); Lecidea exsecuta (Nyl.) Hue (1913); Blastenia exsecuta (Nyl.) Servít (1929)

= Lendemeriella exsecuta =

Species of lichen-forming fungus

Lendemeriella exsecuta is a species of saxicolous (rock-dwelling) crustose lichen in the family Teloschistaceae. First described in 1880, it has a grey, crust-like body with small disc-shaped fruiting structures that range from brownish-yellow to black. The species has a circumpolar distribution, inhabiting Arctic and alpine environments from the European Alps to Antarctica, where it grows on silica-rich rocks in sheltered, humid locations.

== Taxonomy ==
The species was first described in 1880 by the Finnish lichenologist William Nylander, who classified it as a member of the genus Lecanora. After having been shuffled to various genera in its taxonomic history, Sergey Kondratyuk transferred it to the genus Lendemeriella in 2020.

== Description ==
Lendemeriella exsecuta is a crustose lichen, meaning it grows as a thin, crust-like layer tightly attached to its substrate. The main body (thallus) appears grey, occasionally dark grey or off-white, and forms a continuous surface that may develop small cracks creating distinct segments called areoles. These areoles measure 0.5–1 mm across and may appear slightly pinched at their base.

The reproductive structures (apothecia) are small disc-like organs measuring 0.2–0.7 mm in diameter. These sit directly on the surface without a stalk and display considerable colour variation – from brownish-yellow to orange-brown, eventually becoming completely black. The discs are surrounded by a raised rim (proper margin) that ranges from black to olive in colour and may eventually become less prominent as the disc becomes more convex.

When viewed under a microscope, the internal structure reveals several distinct layers. The spore-producing layer (hymenium) is colourless and 65–90 micrometres (μm) tall, occasionally reaching 135 μm. It contains cylindrical spore sacs (asci), each producing eight two-celled spores. These transparent spores are ellipsoid in shape, measuring roughly 12–16.5 by 6–7.5 μm, with a distinctive thickened area at their centre.

The lichen contains various chemical compounds, including several pigments that give it its characteristic appearance. When tested with common chemical spot tests, the thallus is K−, C−, and P−. However, the apothecia are K± (red). The lichen's chemistry includes several secondary metabolites such as parietin, emodin, and fragilin, along with a unique substance that remains unidentified. Like most lichens, it contains photosynthetic green algal cells (chlorococcoid photobiont) that provide energy through photosynthesis.

== Habitat and distribution ==
Lendemeriella exsecuta primarily inhabits Arctic and alpine environments, where it grows on silica-rich rocks that have a basic (non-acidic) chemistry. This lichen shows a preference for sheltered locations protected from strong winds, particularly in areas around and above the treeline where conditions are humid. While it is believed to have a circumpolar distribution – occurring in a band around the Earth's polar regions – it is particularly well-documented in the Alps mountain range of Europe. A single collection has been recorded from Bering Island (Russian Far East). In the Antarctic, it has been documented from the South Shetland Islands and the Antarctic Peninsula, where it often grows alongside Umbilicaria decussata and Usnea sphacelata. Placopsis antarctica is another typical associate.
