= Amylora =

Scientific classification
- Kingdom: Fungi
- Division: Ascomycota
- Class: Lecanoromycetes
- Order: Baeomycetales
- Family: Trapeliaceae
- Genus: Amylora; Rambold (1994)
- Species: A. cervinocuprea

Binomial name
- Amylora cervinocuprea (Arnold) Rambold (1994)

Synonyms
- Aspicilia cervinocuprea Arnold (1876); Lecanora cervinocuprea (Arnold) Mig. (1926)

Single-species lichen genus

Amylora is a fungal genus in the family Trapeliaceae. It is a monospecific genus, containing the single species Amylora cervinocuprea, a lichen. This rare lichen forms crusty patches that break into small, tile-like sections on rock surfaces in high-elevation mountain environments. It is known only from a few locations in the eastern Alps of Austria and Switzerland, where it grows in extreme alpine conditions. Both the genus and the species were newly described by Gerhard Rambold in 1994.

== Description ==
Amylora is a monospecific genus; its sole species, Amylora cervinocuprea, forms a crust-like thallus that breaks into small, tile-like patches (areoles) with a smooth surface and slightly lobed, outlined margins (effigurate). The thallus is covered by a compact "skin" (a paraplectenchymatous cortex made of brick-like cells) overlain by a well-developed, very thin outer film (epicortex). Beneath this is a continuous layer of the photosynthetic partner (the algal layer) and a medulla (the inner, cottony part of the lichen). The medulla gives a blue reaction with iodine (an amyloid reaction), and its hyphae are bead-like (moniliform).

The sexual fruiting bodies (apothecia) are sunken in the thallus; their exposed discs are brown to blackish brown. The rim (true exciple) is weak and ring-like, with a dark greenish outer zone and a clear to yellowish inner zone. The tissue between the asci (paraphyses) consists of threads that branch and fuse (anastomose) and are slightly thickened at their tips; the jelly in which the asci are embedded gives a pale amyloid reaction. The asci are club-shaped, contain eight ascospores, and show a diagnostic iodine-positive architecture: the outer wall and the tholus (thickened apex) stain blue, with an amyloid "cap" and amyloid margins around a central clear area; two deeper-blue, tube-like zones can be seen around that centre. This pattern matches what authors term the Rimularia-type ascus; it is stable even after pretreating the tissue with potassium hydroxide solution. The spores themselves are colourless (hyaline), one-celled, ellipsoid, and surrounded by a conspicuous gelatinous sheath (a halo).

Asexual propagules are produced in simple, sunken pycnidia within the thallus; these structures release narrow, rod-shaped (bacilliform) conidia. Chemically, Amylora contains 5-O-methylhiascic acid as its major lichen product; this substance is otherwise often only a minor component in lichens characterised by the gyrophoric acid chemosyndrome, and its prominence here has been used as a supporting character in classification. Developmentally, the sexual structures begin just beneath the algal layer with curved female organs (ascogonia) that produce receptive filaments (trichogynes). Early stages resemble those seen in Placopsis: an undifferentiated primordium forms, then separates into an upper zone with paraphysoids and a lower zone with ascogenous hyphae, before true paraphyses and asci replace the paraphysoids to form the mature hymenium. The overall development is weakly hemiangiocarpous—i.e., only partially covered in the early stages, with the cover breaking as the apothecium matures—and the hamathecium at maturity consists of true paraphyses.

== Habitat and distribution ==
Amylora cervinocuprea is known from the Alps of Austria (Tyrol) and eastern Switzerland. Austrian records include Obergurgl in the Ötztal, the Breslauer Hütte area, Ötztaler Urkund in the Pitztal, and the Riffelsee area. Swiss material comes from Fimbertal near the Heidelberger Hütte. These records indicate a distribution centred in high-mountain localities of the eastern Alps.
