= Ducatina =

Scientific classification
- Domain: Eukaryota
- Kingdom: Fungi
- Division: Ascomycota
- Class: Lecanoromycetes
- Order: Baeomycetales
- Family: Trapeliaceae
- Genus: Ducatina; Ertz & Søchting (2017)
- Species: D. umbilicata

Binomial name
- Ducatina umbilicata Ertz & Søchting (2017)

Species of lichen

Ducatina is a genus of umbilicate lichen in the family Trapeliaceae. It is monotypic, containing the single species Ducatina umbilicata. Both the genus and species were described as new to science in 2017 by Damien Ertz and Ulrik Søchting. The lichen is widespread and abundant in the remote subantarctic Crozet and Kerguelen Islands in the Indian Ocean, where it grows on the exposed horizontal surfaces of rocks. According to the authors, the thallus morphology is "reminiscent of a weathered metal coin (with the idea that it was hidden on remote islands by some unknown pirates)"; the name Ducatina, derived from the word ducatus, refers to this.
