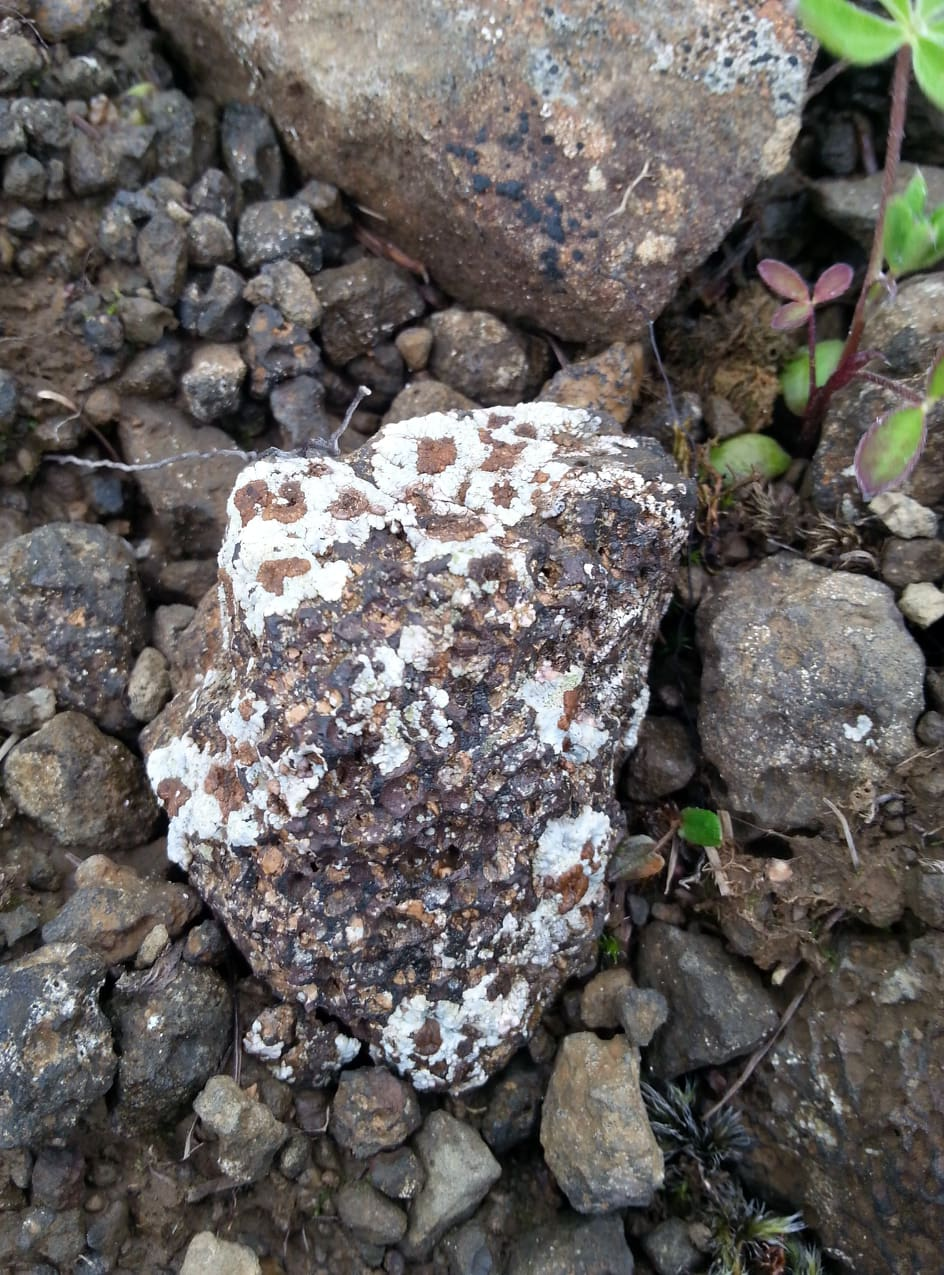
- in Iceland

Conservation status
- Apparently Secure (NatureServe)

Scientific classification
- Kingdom: Fungi
- Division: Ascomycota
- Class: Lecanoromycetes
- Order: Baeomycetales
- Family: Trapeliaceae
- Genus: Placopsis
- Species: P. gelida

Binomial name
- Placopsis gelida (L.) Linds. (1866)

Synonyms
- List: Parmelia gelida (L.) Ach. (1803); Lecanora gelida (L.) Ach. (1810); Placodium gelidum (L.) Gray (1821); Squamaria gelida (L.) Hook. (1830); Patellaria gelida (L.) Trevis. (1852); Psoroma gelidum (L.) Rabenh. (1870)

= Placopsis gelida =

Species of lichen-forming fungus

Placopsis gelida is a species of saxicolous (rock-dwelling) crustose lichen in the family Trapeliaceae. It forms circular patches on rock surfaces, with a greyish or pinkish body that develops a distinctive cracked, tile-like pattern in the centre and narrow finger-like projections around the edges. The lichen is recognised by its conspicuous reddish-brown, wart-like outgrowths scattered across its surface, which contain additional photosynthetic partners. It reproduces mainly through powdery patches that spread in radiating streaks across the lichen body.

== Taxonomy ==
The lichen was first described by Carl Linnaeus in 1767, as Lichen gelidus. In his description, Linnaeus characterized it as having a crustaceous thallus that is whitish in colour with rugose (wrinkled) and tessellated (checkered) surface patterns. He noted that the species occurs on rocks in Iceland, and described the crust as foliaceous (leaf-like) and orbicular (circular), with surfaces that are closely adhered and somewhat shiny, featuring longitudinally arranged, elevated areas. The apothecia (fruiting bodies) occupy the reddish-brown, convex areas and were described as having multiple elevated, radially arranged folds with a hairy margin.

The lichen has been transferred to various genera in its taxonomic history. In 1866, William Lauder Lindsay reclassified it in the genus Placopsis, giving it its current binomial name.

== Description ==
The thallus (lichen body) is dull grey, pinkish, or pale brown and lies closely attached to the surface it grows on, forming rosettes 1–5 cm across. The centre commonly breaks into a cracked, tile-like mosaic (rimose-areolate), while the margin bears narrow, deeply cut (incised) lobes that radiate outwards and are 0.5–1.5 mm wide; the surface is mostly matt, becoming slightly shinier at the lobe tips. Scattered across the thallus are conspicuous, clearly lobed cephalodia—wart-like outgrowths that in many lichens house a secondary photosynthetic partner—flesh-coloured to dark red-brown and 0.5–4 mm in diameter. Powdery reproductive patches (soralia) are arranged in radial streaks, each mostly 0.5–0.9 mm long; they are greenish to greyish, often look eroded, and become more abundant towards the centre.

Sexual fruiting bodies (apothecia) are occasional, 0.8–1.6 mm in diameter, and sit directly on the thallus (sessile). They have a thick, unbroken rim made from thallus tissue (a thalline margin); the disc is flat, rough, and dark pink-, yellow-, or red-brown, sometimes dusted with a whitish, frost-like coating (pruina). The sexual spores (ascospores) measure 13–18 × 6–8.5 micrometres (μm). Tiny flask-like asexual structures (pycnidia) are rare and sunk into the thallus; they produce long, thread-like conidia 15–25 × about 0.5 μm. In the standard bleach spot test (C), the thallus turns red (C+), indicating the presence of gyrophoric acid, sometimes with traces of lecanoric acid.

== Habitat and distribution ==
Placopsis gelida is regarded as a cosmopolitan species. In southern South America, it has been recorded from the Juan Fernández Archipelago, based on high-elevation collections from Más Afuera (now Alejandro Selkirk Island) at about 1,360 m and from Casatales at about 1,100–1,140 m, both gathered during the "Svenska Pacific Expeditionen 1916–1917".

== See also ==
- List of lichens named by Carl Linnaeus
