= Placopsis cribellans =

Scientific classification
- Kingdom: Fungi
- Division: Ascomycota
- Class: Lecanoromycetes
- Order: Baeomycetales
- Family: Trapeliaceae
- Genus: Placopsis
- Species: P. cribellans

Binomial name
- Placopsis cribellans (Nyl.) Räsänen (1940)

Synonyms
- Lecanora cribellans Nyl. (1890)

Species of lichen-forming fungus

Placopsis cribellans is a species of crustose lichen in the family Trapeliaceae. It forms small, neat rosettes or irregular patches on rock, with a surface that appears pale green when wet and shifts to grey-white or fawnish when dry. The thallus bears tiny spherical isidia that break off easily, leaving characteristic pits, and produces reddish-brown disc-shaped fruiting bodies. The species has a wide distribution, with records from East Asia, the Pacific islands, Australia, and both North and South America.

== Taxonomy ==
It was first described as a new species in 1890 by the Finnish lichenologist William Nylander, as a species of Lecanora. Veli Räsänen reclassified it in Placopsis in 1940.

== Description ==
Placopsis cribellans is a crust-forming lichen that typically makes small, tidy rosettes or irregular, closely appressed patches on rock, without a distinct marginal border (a projecting prothallus). The thallus is made up of convex, fairly narrow lobes that are contiguous or only slightly separated from the edge towards the centre. When wet, the upper surface is pale green to green-brown; when dry, it shifts to grey-white, fawnish, or grey-brown, often darkening towards the lobe tips. Under a hand lens it may show scattered white maculae (spots), and the surface ranges from smooth and glossy to dull, often becoming pitted or punctate with tiny scars where isidia have been rubbed away. It lacks soredia and usually lacks pruina. The isidia are spherical and small (up to about 0.1 mm across), scattered to densely crowded; they abrade readily, leaving whitish to dark grey-green or blackened pits.

Apothecia are mostly central; when crowded they can become misshapen where they press against one another. Their rim is thick and swollen (about 0.1–0.2 mm), glossy, and smooth to slightly scalloped, and it is the same colour as the surrounding thallus. The disc is pale to dark red-brown, flat to concave, and not pruinose. Microscopically, the spore-bearing layer (the hymenium) is tall, about 130–300 micrometres (μm). The ascospores are colourless and broadly ellipsoid, about 17.5–22.5 × 9–12.5 μm, and the asexual propagules (conidia) are thread-like, about 18–21 × 0.5–1 μm.

== Habitat and distribution ==
Placopsis cribellans has been treated as a widespread, cosmopolitan species, with records reported from East Asia (Japan, Korea, Taiwan), the Pacific (including Hawaii and Papua New Guinea), Australia, the Galápagos Islands, and Tristan da Cunha, as well as the Aleutian Islands, British Columbia, and the far south of South America; it is also reported from New Zealand. In southern South America, the source reports collections from Chile's Juan Fernández Archipelago, including Más Afuera at about 1,000 m in grassland with scattered plants of Lophosoria, and an older specimen from Más a Tierra (Tres Puntas, about 200 m) that had been filed under another name before being recognised as including Placopsis material. It is also reported from mainland Chile (Brunswick Peninsula, at Puerto Cutter along the shore north of a copper mine) and from Argentina in Tierra del Fuego (Isla Grande, in Parque Nacional de Tierra del Fuego), where it was collected in open meadow and scrub on low hills near Bahía Lapataia, close to the Chilean frontier.
