= Lignoscripta =

Scientific classification
- Domain: Eukaryota
- Kingdom: Fungi
- Division: Ascomycota
- Class: Lecanoromycetes
- Order: Baeomycetales
- Family: Trapeliaceae
- Genus: Lignoscripta; B.D.Ryan (2004)
- Species: L. atroalba

Binomial name
- Lignoscripta atroalba B.D.Ryan & T.H.Nash (2004)

Single-species fungal genus

Lignoscripta is a genus of lichenized fungi in the family Trapeliaceae. This is a monotypic genus, containing the single species Lignoscripta atroalba.
