= Jenny Island =

Island in Antarctica

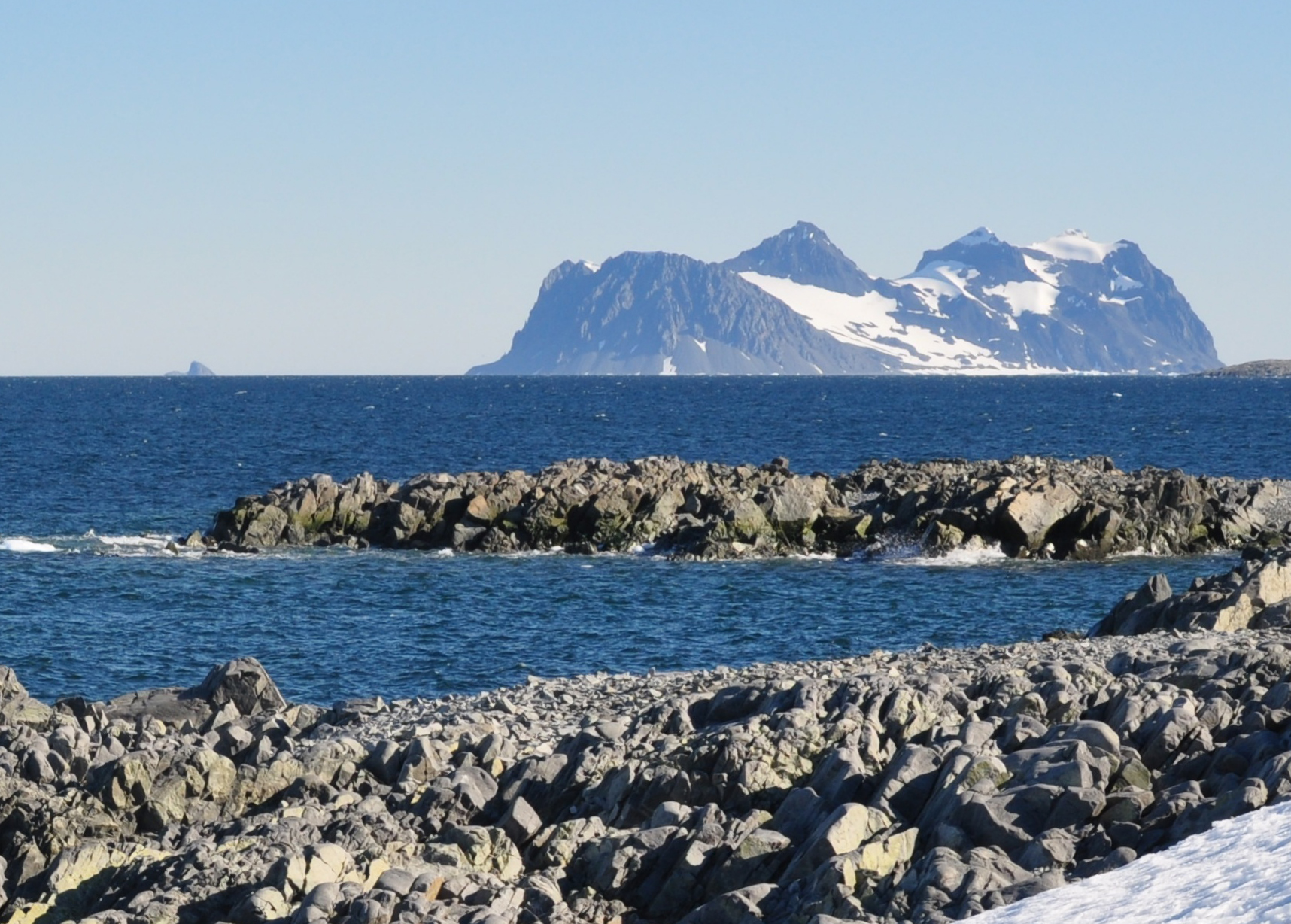
- The high cliffs of Jenny Island towering out from the Antarctic waters

- Location within Antarctica

Geography
- Location: Antarctica
- Coordinates: 67°44′S 68°24′W
- Highest elevation: 500 m (1600 ft)

Administration
- Administered under the Antarctic Treaty System

Demographics
- Population: Uninhabited

Jenny Island or Isla Juanita is a rocky island 3.7 km (2 nmi) long which rises to 500 m (1,600 ft), lying 5.6 km (3 nmi) east of Cape Alexandra, the southeastern extremity of Adelaide Island, in northern Marguerite Bay. Jenny Island is located at 67°44′S 68°24′W.

== First Visitors ==
The island was discovered by the French Antarctic Expedition (1908–1910) under Jean-Baptiste Charcot and named by him for the wife of Sub-Lieutenant Maurice Bongrain, French Navy, second officer of the expedition. Charcot had climbed to the top of the islands ice cliffs to understand that the outlying Adelaide Island was indeed an island. Following he had made expeditions into nearby havens to find a wintering harbor but each time was forced to return to Jenny Island until eventually he moved on.

== Wildlife ==
From time to time Southern elephant seals take refuge on the island to bathe in the sun and the occasional penguin visits also.

== See also ==
- Composite Antarctic Gazetteer
- List of Antarctic and sub-Antarctic islands
- List of Antarctic islands south of 60° S
- SCAR
- Territorial claims in Antarctica
