= William Lauder Lindsay =

Scottish physician and botanist (1829–1880)

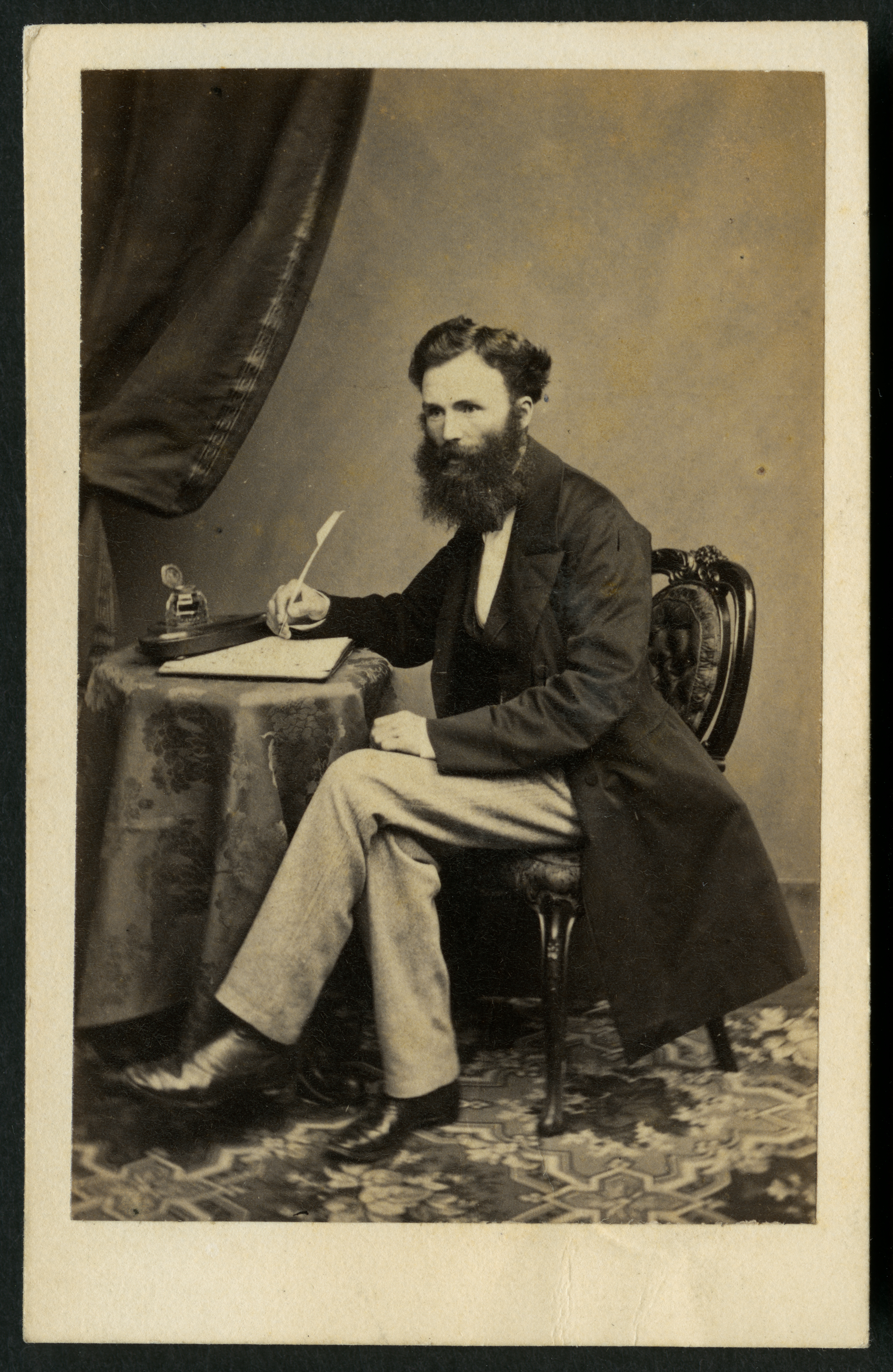
1864 portrait of William Lauder Lindsay

Dr William Lauder Lindsay FRSE FLS LRCS (19 December 1829 – 24 November 1880) was a Scottish physician and botanist. As a physician he largely worked in the field of mental health. As a botanist he specialised in lichens.

== Life ==
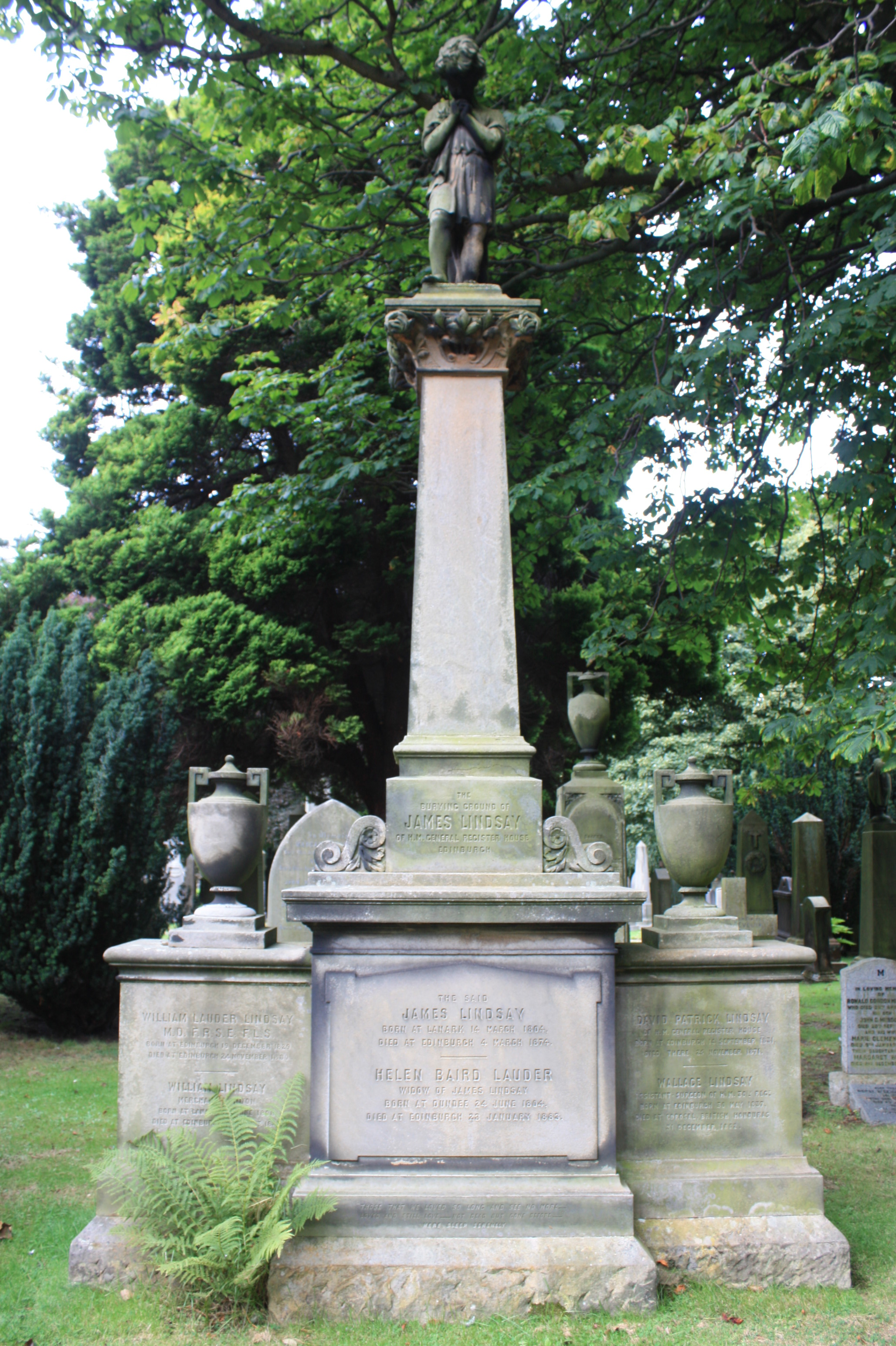
The grave of William Lauder Lindsay, Dean Cemetery, Edinburgh

He was born on 19 December 1829 at 20 Gardners Crescent in western Edinburgh as the son of Helen Baird Lauder (1804–1883) and her husband James Lindsay of Register House/HM Sasine Office (1804–1874).

He was educated at the High School in Edinburgh (being dux of 1844) then studied medicine at the University of Edinburgh receiving his doctorate (MD) in 1852 with the thesis 'The lichens'. In 1853 he began working as an assistant physician at the Crichton Royal Asylum in Dumfries. In 1854 he moved to be a physician at the Murray Royal Asylum in Perth and held this role until 1879.

In 1858 he was elected a Fellow of the Linnean Society (FLS) and in 1861 a Fellow of the Royal Society of Edinburgh. His proposer for the latter was John Hutton Balfour. The Society gave him the Neill Prize of 1859 for his work on lichens.

In 1861 and 1862 he took an extended trip to New Zealand later winning a silver medal in the New Zealand Exhibition of 1865 for services to Botany. He also made several trips to northern Europe.

He died of exhaustion and malnutrition brought on by extreme dyspepsia on 24 November 1880 at his home at 3 Hartington Gardens in Edinburgh. He was aged 50. He is buried with his parents in Dean Cemetery in western Edinburgh. The grave lies on a short curved path in the south-west of the cemetery.

In 1989, botanists John Charles David and David Leslie Hawksworth published Lauderlindsaya, which is a genus of fungi in the family Verrucariaceae and named in Lindsay's honour.

== Publications ==
Lindsay was a regular contributor to the British Medical Journal, other works include:

- A Popular History of British Lichens (1856)
- Memoir on the Spermogones and Pycnides of Filamentous, Fruticulose and Foliaceous Lichens (1861, vol. 22, Transactions of the Royal Society of Edinburgh) (See wiktionary:spermogonium and pycnidium.)
- On the Geology of the Goldfields of Otago, New Zealand (1862, Reports of the British Association for the Advancement of Science]
- On the Geology of the New Zealand Gold-fields (1865)
- Observations on New Lichens and Fungi Collected in Otago, New Zealand (1866)
- Observations on New-Zealand Lichens (1866, vol. 25, Transactions of the Linnean Society of London)
- Contributions to New Zealand Botany (1868)
- Observations on the Lichens collected by Dr. Robert Brown, M.A., F.R.G.S., in West Greenland in 1867 (1871, vol. 27, Transactions of the Linnean Society of London)
- Memoir on the Spermogones and Pycnides of Crustaceous Lichens (1870); 1872 edition
- Memoirs on the Spermogones and Pycnides of Lichens (1872); 1874 edition
- The Superannuation of Officers in British Hospitals for the Insane (1875)
- Mind in the Lower Animals in Health and Disease (1879)

== Family ==
In 1859 he married Elizabeth Reid, daughter of William Paterson Reid WS of Demarara. She died in 1863. They had one daughter, Marion Jane Lindsay, who married Dr Francis Haultain of Edinburgh.

His elder brother Wallace Lindsay (1827–1857) was also a physician, serving in the army. His younger brother David Patrick Lindsay (1831–1871) worked at General Register House.
