= Elke Mackenzie =

British polar explorer and lichenologist (1911–1990)

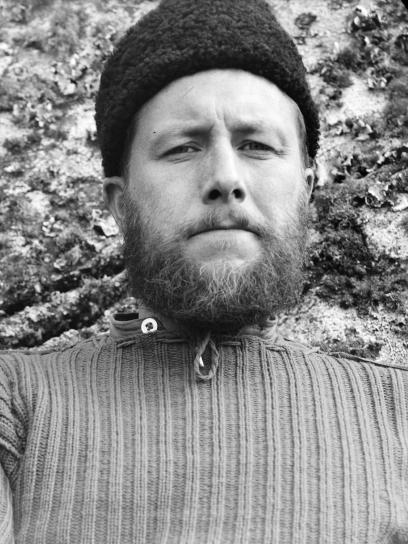
- Mackenzie in 1944
- Born: Ivan Mackenzie Lamb; 11 September 1911; Clapham, London, UK
- Died: 18 January 1990 (aged 78); Braintree, Massachusetts, US
- Education: University of Edinburgh
- Scientific career
- Fields: Lichenology
- Workplaces: British Museum (Natural History); National University of Tucumán; National Museum of Canada; Farlow Herbarium of Cryptogamic Botany
- Doctoral students: Vernon Ahmadjian; Royall T. Moore
- Author abbrev. (botany): I.M.Lamb

Elke Mackenzie (11 September 1911 – 18 January 1990), born Ivan Mackenzie Lamb, was a British polar explorer and botanist who specialised in the field of lichenology. Beginning her education in Edinburgh, Scotland, Mackenzie later pursued botany at the University of Edinburgh, earning a Bachelor of Science degree in 1933 and a Doctor of Science in 1942. In the two years she was involved in Operation Tabarin, a covert World War II mission to Antarctica, she identified and documented many lichen species, several of them previously unknown to science.

Over the course of her career in academia, Mackenzie held positions at the British Museum, National University of Tucumán, National Museum of Canada, and the Farlow Herbarium of Cryptogamic Botany at Harvard University. In 1971, Mackenzie transitioned, renaming herself to Elke Mackenzie, and faced institutional prejudice as a result. After retirement, her later years were marred by poor health. Despite facing adversity, her legacy is preserved in the names of two genera, numerous species and a cape, all named in her honour. Mackenzie's contributions to polar exploration earned her polar medals from both the United Kingdom and the United States.

== Early life ==
Mackenzie was born in Clapham, London, on 11 September 1911. She was assigned male and was raised as a boy. Mackenzie's family moved to Scotland while she was a child, and she was enrolled in the Edinburgh Academy. After her graduation in 1929, she attended the University of Edinburgh. She earned her B.Sc. with Honours in Botany in 1933. She received a scholarship from the German Academic Exchange Service, and continued doing research in botany at the Ludwig-Maximilians-Universität München and the University of Würzburg.

== Career ==
=== British Museum and Antarctic exploration ===
In the mid-1930s, the department of botany at the British Museum (Natural History) in London established three new assistant keeper positions. Mackenzie was appointed to the first of these roles, specifically for lichen research, on 14 January 1935. She was mentored by lichenologist Annie Lorrain Smith, who had recently retired. Mackenzie became especially interested in the lichen flora of the Antarctic, as it was comparatively unknown, and she began studying early British, French, and Belgian Antarctic collections in Turkey and Paris. She earned her Doctor of Science from the University of Edinburgh in 1942, with a thesis titled "A monograph of the lichen genus Placopsis".

Mackenzie, a conscientious objector, remained employed at the museum until 20 September 1943. During this time, she produced monographs on the lichen genera Neuropogon and Placopsis, focussing in both on their Antarctic species. Through this work, she connected with James Marr, a biologist from the Discovery Investigations. Marr later led Operation Tabarin, a convert mission instigated by Winston Churchill during the Second World War. This expedition aimed to reinforce British territorial claims in the Antarctic Peninsula, countering Argentine and Chilean claims, by establishing permanent bases and conducting scientific research. Further, there were concerns about the potential use of the Antarctic and sub-Antarctic regions by enemy warships and submarines. By establishing a presence in the region, the British could better monitor any naval activity and potentially disrupt enemy operations. Marr recruited Mackenzie to serve as the expedition's botanist.

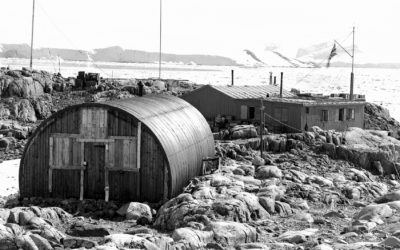
Operation Tabarin. Base A, Port Lockroy; photographed by Mackenzie in 1945

Mackenzie joined the crew in 1943 at Base A in Port Lockroy, where she was tasked with both botanical and geological collecting. At the island, Mackenzie participated in several short manhauling expeditions, involving the manual transportation of two Nansen sleds, each carrying 700 pounds (320 kg) of food and scientific equipment. In 1945, the team introduced twenty-five huskies from Labrador Canada, to bolster sledding operations. These sled dogs enabled more extensive surveying and exploratory journeys. Mackenzie was a member of the sledding team that navigated the Prince Gustav Channel along the eastern coast of the Graham Land peninsula, and later ventured eastward along the southern edge of James Ross Island, eventually rounding its easternmost point before making their way northwest back to Hope Bay. On one of these sledding expeditions, Mackenzie and a colleague chanced upon Otto Nordenskjöld's hut on Snow Hill Island, a relic untouched for more than four decades since the Swedish Antarctic Expedition of 1901–1903.

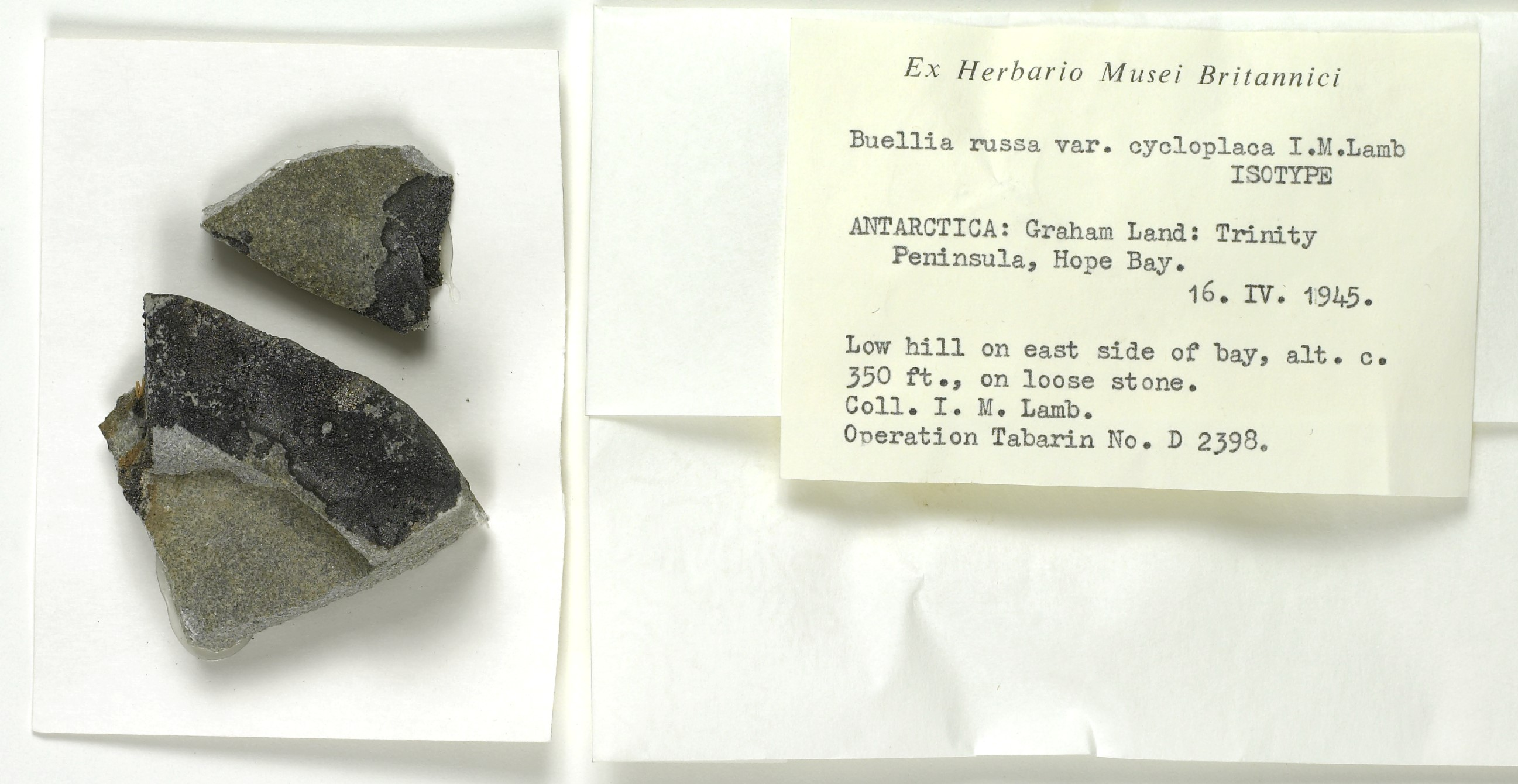
Isotype of Buellia russa var. cycloplaca from Trinity Peninsula; collected by Mackenzie in 1945

Mackenzie collected lichen samples and conducted experiments on the accumulation of snow and subsequent thawing. Among her discoveries was the permanently submerged marine lichen, Verrucaria serpuloides. During her stay from February 1944 to January 1946 in the Antarctic, Mackenzie documented a collection of 1,030 botanical specimens, with a significant portion personally collected by her. This collection encompassed lichens, bryophytes, different types of algae, seed plants, fungi, and diatoms. The majority of these collections were made around the bases at Port Lockroy and Hope Bay, though she also sourced specimens from nearby excursions and during three extensive sled journeys covering approximately 800 miles (1,300 km). Mackenzie determined the genus of every lichen specimen, discovering some previously unrecorded in the Antarctic or unique to the Graham Land region.

=== Post-war academia and research ===
After the war, Mackenzie became professor of cryptogamic botany at National University of Tucumán. Her wife had developed severe arthritis, and Mackenzie thought the warm Argentinian climate would help alleviate this. She traveled extensively in Argentina and Brazil to collect Stereocaulon and marine algae samples. An unfortunate professional incident was shared by a family acquaintance who was assisting in the transportation of Mackenzie, returning from having spent several weeks collecting specimens in the mountains on horseback. As Mackenzie, the driver, and her family descended from the mountains, the shaking of the truck combined with a powerful wind caused the entire stack of collected specimens, along with their valuable annotations, to be irretrievably lost.

In 1950, Mackenzie was put into contact with Erling Porsild, who hired her as a cryptogamic botanist at the National Museum of Canada in Ottawa. After the move to Canada, Mackenzie sold her private herbarium of 3,200 specimens to the Canadian Museum of Nature. She continued to collect, gathering specimens from various locations in Canada, including the Rocky Mountains, Cypress Hills (Saskatchewan), Newfoundland, Cape Breton Island (Nova Scotia), and the Ottawa area.

Farlow Herbarium of Cryptogamic Botany

In 1953, Mackenzie was offered the directorship of the Farlow Herbarium of Cryptogamic Botany by Harvard University, and she left Canada. Mackenzie met Vernon Ahmadjian in 1955 when they both took a marine botany course at the Marine Biological Laboratory in Woods Hole, Massachusetts. Their shared passion for lichens led to Ahmadjian enrolling as Mackenzie's first graduate student at Harvard the following year.

=== Antarctic return and other research endeavours ===
In 1960, Mackenzie became a US citizen. A year later, she travelled to the McMurdo Sound in Antarctica on behalf of the National Science Foundation. During this visit, under Operation Deep Freeze (codename for a series of United States missions to Antarctica), she observed the region's biological facilities and research. In 1963, she published the Index Nominum Lichenum, a catalogue that she had compiled between 1932 and 1960. It encompassed all lichen taxa names introduced during that span. Her work built upon Alexander Zahlbruckner's foundational Catalogus lichenum universalis.

Mackenzie returned to Antarctica for a third time in October 1964, where she undertook scuba diving investigations with her colleagues from France and Argentina, under a grant from the National Science Foundation and with the logistic support of the Argentine Navy. This study, to which Mackenzie referred to as "Operation Gooseflesh", took part in the South Shetland and Melchior Islands. During her stay, Mackenzie collected Verrucaria serpuloides, which she had previously discovered in 1944. She was awarded a US polar medal for her work. After Mackenzie left in 1965, Denis Christopher Lindsay of the British Antarctic Survey continued her surveys on the South Shetland Islands. Over the next three years, Mackenzie continued to collect specimens throughout Europe and Mexico.

=== Professional relations ===
During the mid-20th century, Mackenzie and Carroll William Dodge were among the leading figures studying Antarctic lichens. Both made significant contributions to the field, with Dodge focusing on preparing a comprehensive flora for the Antarctic continent and Mackenzie examining the lichens of the Antarctic Peninsula and nearby islands. Mackenzie had an adversarial rivalry with Dodge, criticising him for what she saw as "reckless taxonomy". She ceased her research on Antarctic lichens in 1969 upon learning that Dodge was on the verge of publishing his own account of them. Furthermore, when reviewing Dodge's 1973 publication, Lichen Flora of the Antarctic Continent and Adjacent Islands, she dismissed it for what she described as its dubious scholarship. Other scientists have since corroborated Mackenzie's position.

== Personal life ==
Mackenzie married Maila Elvira Laabefo of Finland in 1936, with whom she had two sons and a daughter. One son, Eric Mackenzie-Lamb, became a noted crime fiction author. The 1960s proved challenging for Mackenzie due to escalating personal and professional responsibilities. The move to Canada had been a significant expense, which may have contributed to Mackenzie's decision to sell her private herbarium of 3,200 specimens of European and South American plants to the Canadian Museum of Nature. It was revealed that Maila had amassed significant debts in Mackenzie's name; at one point, to reduce expenses, Mackenzie took up quarters in the Farlow Herbarium, where she "subsisted on a diet of potato chips and Coca Cola". Coupled with other challenges in her life, Mackenzie faced episodes of depression and even contemplated suicide. Ultimately, she obtained a legal separation from Maila.

After separation, Mackenzie visited a specialist in New York City, who diagnosed her with "dysphonia syndrome", a disorder affecting the larynx. In 1971, Mackenzie transitioned, underwent a gender-affirming surgery, and renamed herself to Elke Mackenzie. Following her transition, she found herself compelled to retire prematurely, encountering disapproval from the Farlow Herbarium, a sentiment underscored by her friend, Laurence Senelick. Mackenzie retired from Farlow in 1972 at the age of 60. The final specimen she recorded, dated 1973, was Pylaiella littoralis, an alga collected from the mudflats of Maine.

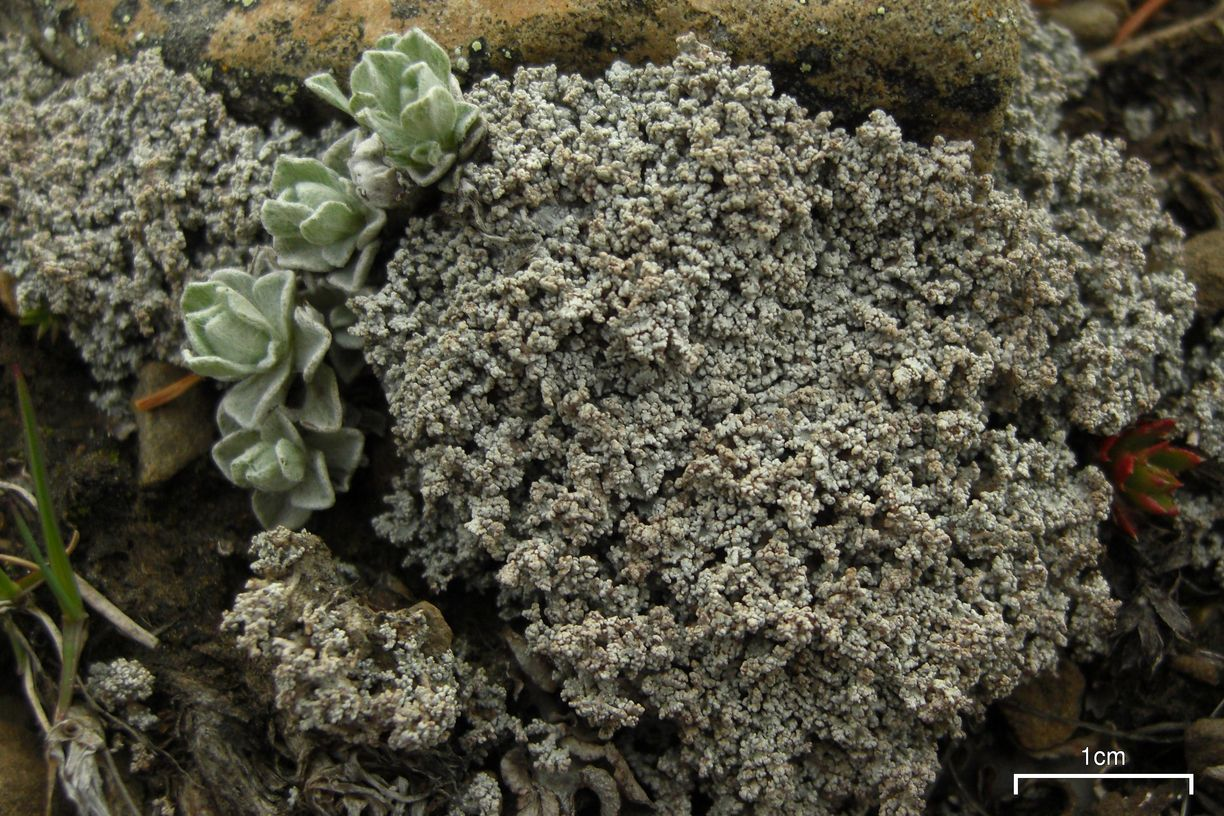
MacKenzie never finished her magnum opus: a worldwide monograph on the lichen genus Stereocaulon. Shown is Stereocaulon alpinum, widely distributed in the Antarctic.

During the next six years, Mackenzie lost interest in her work with cryptogams, preferring to translate German botanical textbooks into English. She constructed an A-frame bungalow in Costa Rica, and moved there in 1976. Mackenzie made a discreet announcement in the International Lichenological Newsletter's October 1976 issue, simply stating she "should now be addressed as Dr. Elke Mackenzie". Some years earlier in 1972, in one of her final publications (published as "I.M. Lamb"), she cited the help of "Miss Elke Mackenzie". In 1980, Mackenzie returned to Cambridge, Massachusetts to live with her daughter, citing political unrest in Costa Rica. There, she took up woodworking and furniture craftmanship, cultivating an interest in recreating reproductions of seaman's chests. Nevertheless, her physical well-being began to decline, ultimately leading to her diagnosis with motor neurone disease in 1983. She was bedridden from 1986 until her death. Mackenzie died in 1990, in Braintree, Massachusetts.

Robert Ross, who worked with Mackenzie at the British Museum in the early 1940s, described her as "always perfectly amiable and polite and never difficult to deal with, but not inclined to chat". In the obituary written by surveyor Andrew Taylor, a colleague on Operation Tabarin, he wrote that Mackenzie was broadly admired by all for her "gentle kindness and generosity". Former graduate student Vernon Ahmadjian called Mackenzie "the most considerate, patient, helpful and unselfish advisor that a graduate student could have wished for".

Mackenzie's lifelong work on a comprehensive monograph of Stereocaulon was never completed. Although her original drawings and exsiccata material of this genus were lost due to fire and mildew, she published some results in an abridged form, as well as an identification key to the species of Stereocaulon. Mackenzie's diary and documents reside in the archives of the British Antarctic Survey. Within this collection are comprehensive, unpublished notes in which she meticulously reviewed the descriptions of over 170 type specimens collected from Antarctic expeditions.

== Recognition ==
Mackenzie was awarded the British Polar Medal for her involvement in Operation Tabarin, a silver medal with the Antarctic clasp. In 1974, she was elected as an honorary member of the British Lichen Society. Lichenologist and emeritus scientist Irwin M. Brodo called Mackenzie "a first rate lichenologist in every way with a broad knowledge of the taxonomy and anatomy of lichens ... a careful and thorough researcher, taking meticulous notes on everything".

=== Eponyms ===
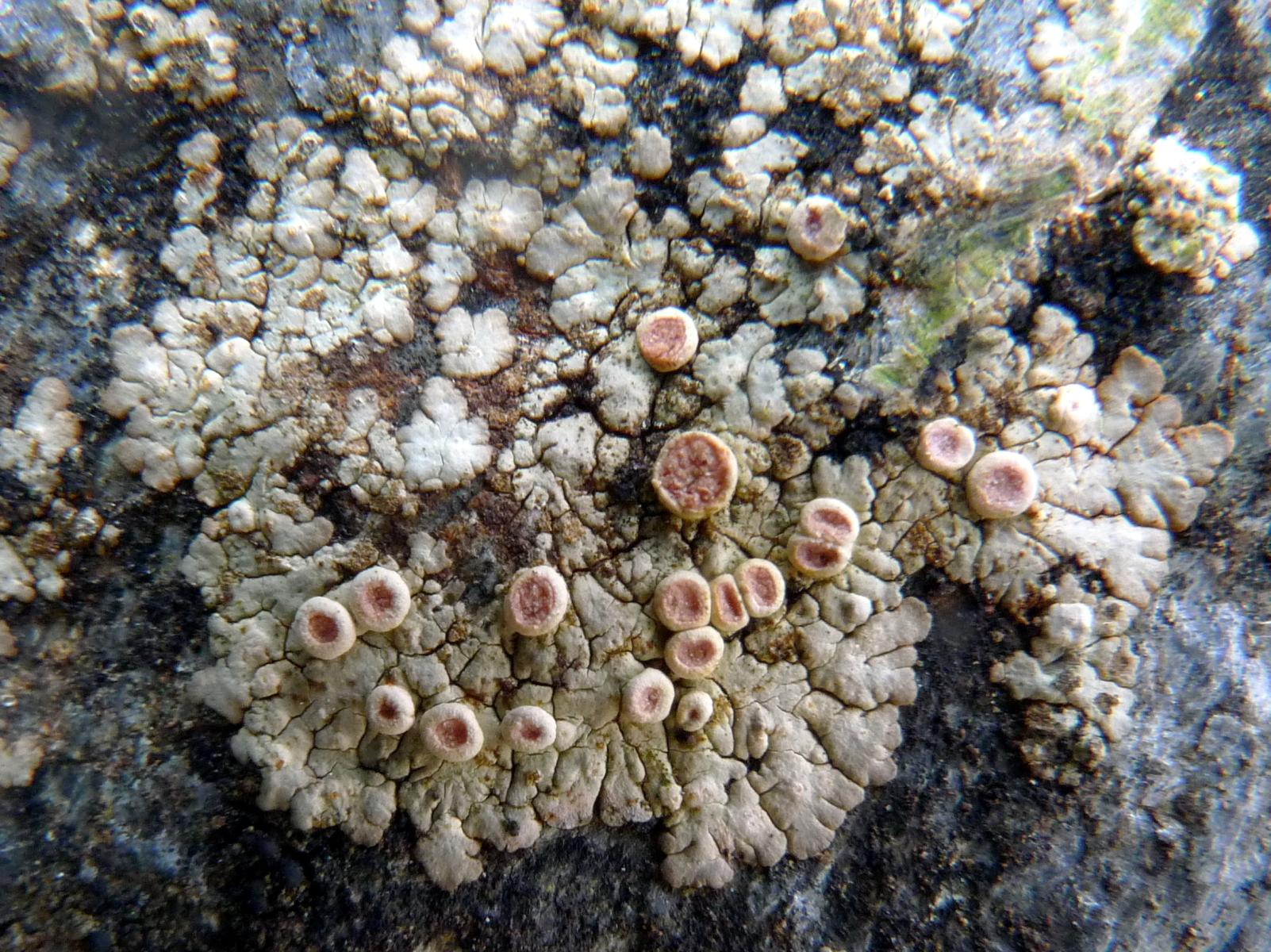
Placopsis lambii is one of several species named in honour of Mackenzie.

Mackenzie is the namesake of two genera, Lambia (genus of green algae in the family Bryopsidaceae) and Lambiella (genus of lichen-forming fungi in the family Xylographaceae), and several species. The list of species includes:

- Antarctocolax lambii Skottsberg (1953)
- Buellia lambii C.W.Dodge (1973)
- Candelariella lambii Hakulinen (1954)
- Neuropogon lambii Imshaug (1954)
- Parmelia lambii Øvstedal (2009)
- Placopsis lambii Hertel & V.Wirth (1987)
- Trebouxia lambii Ahmadjian (1959)
- Umbilicaria lambii Imshaug (1957)
- Verrucaria mackenzie-lambii Erichsen (1940)

Cape Lamb on Vega Island is named for Mackenzie, as she studied the lichen on the island during her career. A promontory on Snow Hill Island, Lamb Cliffs, is also named in her honour.

== Selected publications ==
Mackenzie published 43 papers over a 43-year period; a full listing of her scientific work is given in the obituary written by George Llano. Mackenzie's memoirs on Operation Tabarin and her time in Antarctica, compiled by Stephen Haddelsey and Ronald Lewis-Smith, were published in 2018, titled The Secret South: A Tale of Operation Tabarin, 1943–46. Some of Mackenzie's major works include:

- Lamb, I. Mackenzie (1936). "Lichenological notes from the British Museum herbarium. I" (PDF). Journal of Botany. 74: 174–178.
- ————————— (1947). "Monografía de Placopsis Nyl., género de líquenes de la familia Lecanoraceae" [Monograph of the lichen genus Placopsis Nyl.]. Lilloa. 13: 151–288.
- ————————— (1948). "Apuntes sobre líquenes nuevos, raros o interesantes del hemisferio austral" [New, rare or interesting lichens from the Southern Hemisphere. I]. Lilloa. 14: 203–251.
- ————————— (1953). "Líquenes nuevos, raros o interesantes del hemisferio austral - II" [New, rare or interesting lichens from the Southern Hemisphere. II]. Lilloa. 26: 401–438.
- ————————— (1955). "New lichens from northern Patagonia, with notes on some related species". Farlowia. 4: 423–471.
- ————————— (1970). "Antarctic terrestrial plants and their ecology". In Holdgate, M.W. (ed.). Antarctic Ecology. London and New York: Academic Press. pp. 733–751. ISBN 978-0-12-352102-6.

== See also ==
- Category:Taxa named by Elke Mackenzie
