= Cephalodium =

Morphological structure found in some lichens

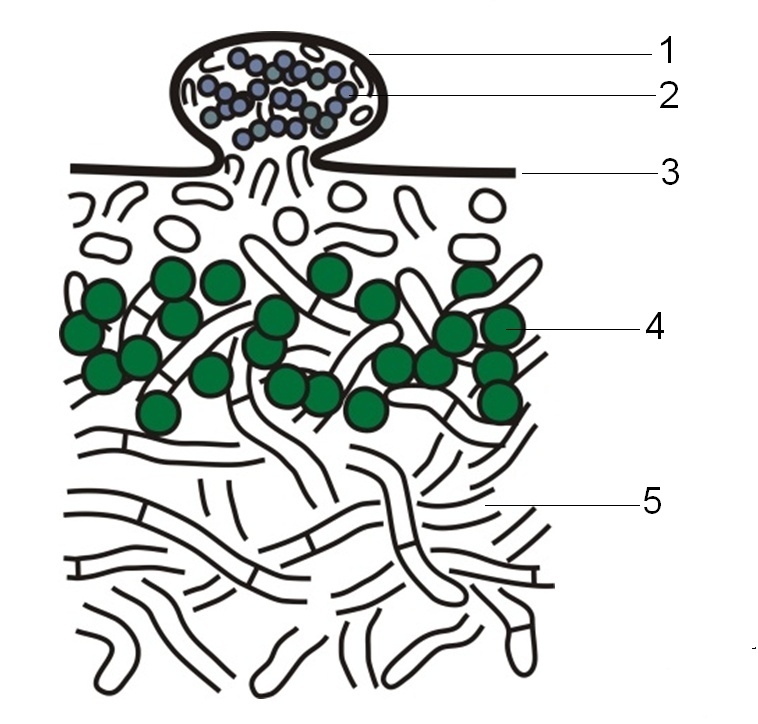
Illustration showing cephalodium in relation to other parts of the lichen: 1 – Cephalodium 2 – Cyanobacteria 3 – Cortex 4 – Green algal photobiont 5 – Medulla

A cephalodium (pl. cephalodia) is a small gall-like structure found in some lichens. They occur only in lichens which contain both cyanobacterial and green algal partners. Cephalodia can occur within the tissues of the lichen, or on its upper or lower surface. Lichens with cephalodia can fix nitrogen, and may be an important contributor of nitrogen to the ecosystem.

== Context ==
Lichens are complex organisms composed of a fungal partner and a photosynthetic partner. While the photosynthetic partner is most often a species of green alga, in about 10 percent of all lichens, a species of cyanobacterium is involved instead. In an even smaller number of cases – estimated at between 2 and 4 percent of all lichens – species of both a green alga and a cyanobacterium serve as photosynthetic partners. There are roughly 520 species of these "tripartite" lichens, which fall into at least 21 different genera. In most of these lichens, the green algae live within the lichen's medulla while the cyanobacteria are housed in specialized structures called cephalodia. These can be located on the upper or lower surface of the lichen, or within its interior. In a few species, the cyanobacteria is the main photobiont and the green alga is housed in the cephalodia.

== Description ==
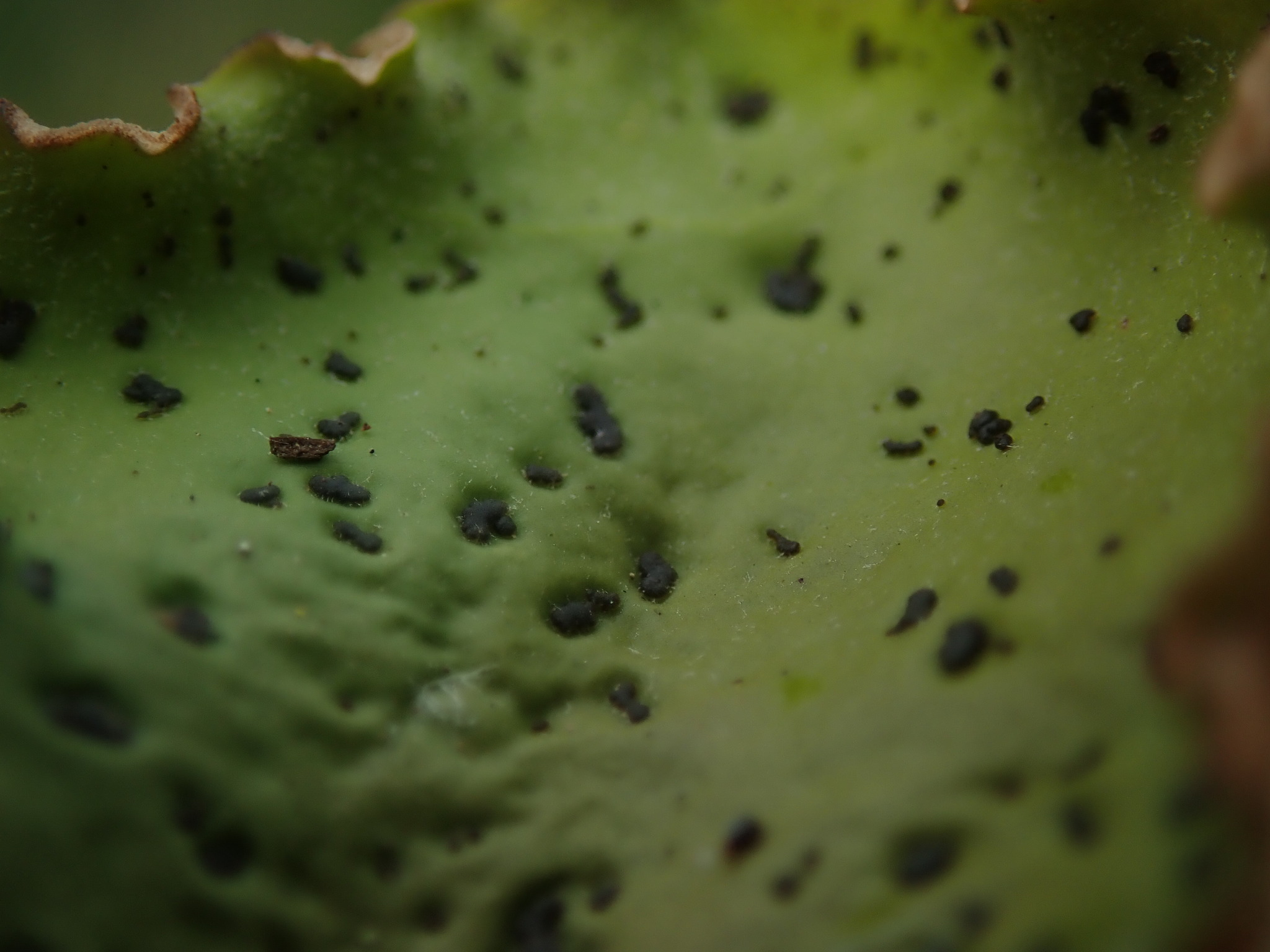
Small black cephalodia on the upper surface of Peltigera aphthosa

Most external cephalodia are gall-like structures that are simple in shape: generally rounded, lobed or sac-like. A few are more complexly coral-like. They can range in size from "minute" to several millimeters across and are typically a different color than the rest of the lichen's thallus. In some lichens, internal cephalodia form as lumps within the lichen's medulla. These can become large enough that the swellings are visible on the lichen's surface. The fungal partner forms a thick layer of cortical tissue around the outside of each internal or external cephalodium, which helps to reduce the oxygen levels in the structure's interior.

Typically, only a single species of cyanobacteria is found in any single cephalodium, and that species is found in all of an individual lichen's cephalodia. However some lichens, like Psoroma spinuliferum, which is known from coastal Alaska, have two different strains of cyanobacteria in two different types of cephalodia. In another Arctic species, Nephroma arcticum, multiple forms of cyanobacteria have been found in the same cephalodia. Researchers have been unable to successfully culture the cyanobacteria, so cannot determine whether these were two different species or two distinct morphs of the same species.

Cyanobacteria known to associate with lichens fall into four genera: Calothrix, Fischerella, Nostoc and Scytonema.

== Formation ==
Many species of cyanobacteria grow epiphytically in the environment, where they may come into contact with the upper or lower surface of a lichen. If the cyanobacteria species is one which is compatible with the lichen's fungal partner, the fungus's hyphae will grow towards and eventually ensnare the cyanobacteria. Lectins (carbohydrate-binding proteins) appear to be instrumental to the recognition of compatibility.

== Nitrogen fixation ==
Cyanobacteria are capable of fixing atmospheric nitrogen. They can take gaseous nitrogen and convert it into a form which both they and the lichen's mycobiont can use. This allows those lichens which contain cyanobacteria to survive on nitrogen-poor substrates. As a result, they are often among the early colonisers of bare rock and soil. Lichens containing cyanobacteria (cyanolichens) are among the major contributors of fixed nitrogen to some ecosystems, including mature tropical highland forests. Cyanobacteria in tripartite lichens (where they are confined to cephalodia) generally have higher rates of nitrogen fixation than do cyanobacteria in bipartite lichens (where they are the main photosynthetic partner).
