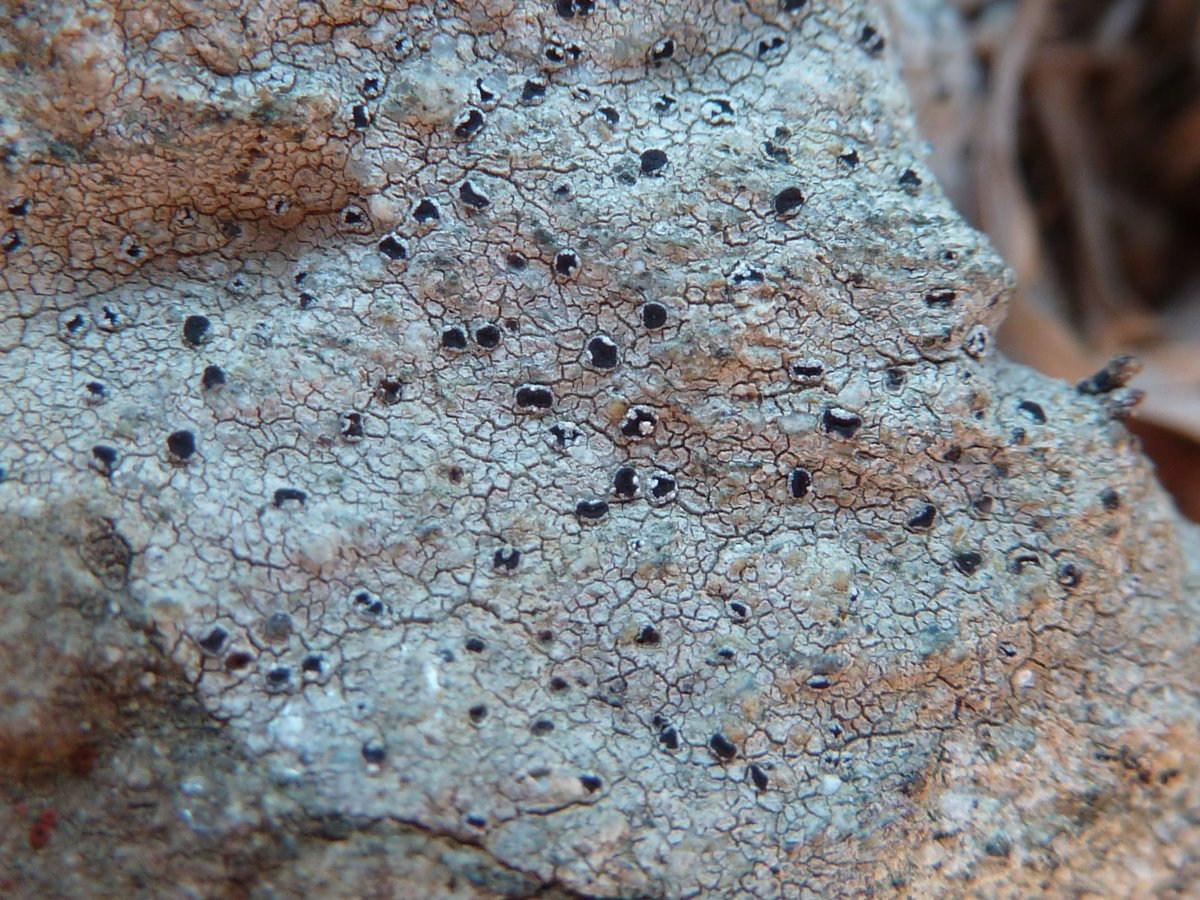
- Trapelia coarctata

Scientific classification
- Kingdom: Fungi
- Division: Ascomycota
- Class: Lecanoromycetes
- Order: Baeomycetales
- Family: Trapeliaceae; M.Choisy ex Hertel (1970)

Type genus
- Trapelia M.Choisy (1929)

Synonyms
- Rimulariaceae Hafellner (1984)

= Trapeliaceae =

Family of lichen-forming fungi

Trapeliaceae is a family of lichens in the order Baeomycetales. The family contains 12 genera and about 125 species.

== Taxonomy ==
Trapeliaceae was originally circumscribed by French lichenologist Maurice Choisy in 1929. Hannes Hertel emended the family in 1970. Because of similarities in ascus structure, the family was originally classified in the Agyriineae, a suborder of the Lecanorales. Preliminary molecular phylogenetic studies showed that Agyriineae was not related to the Lecanorales, and the order Agyriales was resurrected to contain the family. Some authorities considered Trapeliaceae to be synonymous with Agyriaceae.

In a set of formal proposals to stabilise family names, Hawksworth and Eriksson (1988) recommended conserving Trapeliaceae (type: Trapelia) and rejecting Saccomorphaceae (type: Saccomorpha). They characterised the group, then placed in the Lecanorales, as comprising about six genera and about 50 species, including familiar genera such as Placopsis, Placynthiella, Trapelia and Trapeliopsis. They also noted that Choisy had used the family name earlier but that his 1949 usage was not validly published, and that Hertel's 1970 treatment provided the validation after which lichenologists adopted the name consistently. As further support for rejecting the competing name, they pointed out that Saccomorphaceae had seen little uptake (essentially limited to Hafellner, 1984) and that Saccomorpha is a younger synonym of Placynthiella.

In 2007, Thorsten Lumbsch and colleagues transferred Trapeliaceae to the order Baeomycetales based on a sister relationship between Trapeliaceae and a clade in the Baeomycetales. This placement contradicted the results of some previous phylogenetic analyses that showed the Trapeliaceae as neither sister nor contained within the Baeomycetales. In 2011, Brendan Hodkinson and James Lendemer proposed the order Trapeliales to contain the family, as they considered the family to be part of "a clade that is molecularly and morphologically distinct from Baeomycetales". In 2018, the Lecanoromycetes was revised using a temporal approach that uses time-calibrated chronograms to define temporal bands for comparable ranks for orders and families. In this work, Trapeliales was synonymized with Baeomycetales. In a later review of the use of this method for biological classification, Robert Lücking considered this merge justified. This synonymy has been accepted in a recent review of fungal classification.

== Genera ==
- Amylora Rambold (1994) – 1 sp.
- Aspiciliopsis (Müll.Arg.) M.Choisy (1929) – 2 spp.
- Coppinsia Lumbsch & Heibel (1998) – 1 sp.
- Ducatina Ertz & Søchting (2017) – 1 sp.
- Lignoscripta B.D.Ryan (2004) – 1 sp.
- Orceolina Hertel (1970) – 2 spp.
- Placopsis (Nyl.) Linds. (1866) – ca. 60 spp.
- Placynthiella Elenkin (1909) – 9 spp.
- Rimularia Nyl. (1868) – 4 spp.
- Sarea Fr. (1825) – 2 spp.
- Trapelia M.Choisy (1929) – 24 spp.
- Trapeliopsis Hertel & Gotth.Schneid. (1980) – 20 spp.
