= Parainoa =

Scientific classification
- Domain: Eukaryota
- Kingdom: Fungi
- Division: Ascomycota
- Class: Lecanoromycetes
- Order: Baeomycetales
- Family: Baeomycetaceae
- Genus: Parainoa; Resl & T.Sprib. (2014)
- Species: P. subconcolor

Binomial name
- Parainoa subconcolor (Anzi) Resl & T.Sprib. (2014)

Synonyms
- Biatora subconcolor Anzi (1862); Lecidea subconcolor (Anzi) Jatta (1900); Trapelia subconcolor (Anzi) Hertel (1973); Trapeliopsis subconcolor (Anzi) Hertel (1981)

Single-species lichen genus

Parainoa subconcolor is a single-species fungal genus in the family Baeomycetaceae. It comprises the species Parainoa subconcolor, a crustose, saxicolous (rock-dwelling) lichen.

== Taxonomy ==
The genus was circumscribed in 2014 by Philipp Resl and Toby Spribille to accommodate a species previously classified in Trapeliopsis and Trapelia. Parainoa was segregated from other genera based on molecular phylogenetics evidence showing that Trapeliopsis subconcolor was more closely related to Ainoa than to other Trapeliopsis species, yet distinct enough to warrant its own genus. Statistical tests rejected the hypothesis of monophyly between Ainoa and T. subconcolor. The type species, Parainoa subconcolor, was originally described as Biatora subconcolor by Martino Anzi in 1862 from northern Italy. The genus name Parainoa references its phylogenetic relationship to and past confusion with the genus Ainoa, as well as a historically misidentified specimen from the Andean Páramo that was long confused with Ainoa. While the Asian species Trapeliopsis hainanensis was previously thought to be related to P. subconcolor, examination of isotype specimens revealed distinct morphological features, including tightly interwoven exciple hyphae reaching almost to the exciple surface and the presence of an incipient "stalk" in the hypothecium reminiscent of Baeomyces. Further study, including DNA analysis, is needed to determine its proper taxonomic placement.

== Description ==
Parainoa is characterized by a creamish-white, papillate (warty) thallus, yellowish hypothecium, and conglutinated paraphyses. The genus lacks a differentiated, extended hypothecial stalk for the ascoma. Chemically, the species is distinguished by the production of depsidones as secondary metabolites and the presence of stictic acid, which has been confirmed through thin-layer chromatography in multiple specimens. Gyrophoric acid may be present or absent in the fruiting bodies.

== Distribution ==
While originally described from northern Italy, P. subconcolor has not been recently reported from Europe. The species shows a disjunct distribution with two main centres in South and East Asia and the Neotropics.
