= Hymenelia parva =

Scientific classification
- Domain: Eukaryota
- Kingdom: Fungi
- Division: Ascomycota
- Class: Lecanoromycetes
- Order: Baeomycetales
- Family: Hymeneliaceae
- Genus: Hymenelia
- Species: H. parva

Binomial name
- Hymenelia parva Fryday & J.W.McCarthy (2018)

Species of lichen

Hymenelia parva is a species of saxicolous (rock-dwelling), crustose lichen in the family Hymeneliaceae. Found in Canada, it was formally described as a new species in 2018 by lichenologists Alan Fryday and John McCarthy. The type specimen was collected from Saint Mary's Bay in the Avalon Peninsula (Newfoundland and Labrador), where it was found growing on soft reddish-brown shale that was on the seashore. This area is part of the South Avalon–Burin oceanic barrens. The lichen is only known to occur in the type locality. The species epithet parva (Latin for "small" or "little") refers to its relatively small apothecia and ascospores.
