= Trapelia thieleana =

Scientific classification
- Domain: Eukaryota
- Kingdom: Fungi
- Division: Ascomycota
- Class: Lecanoromycetes
- Order: Baeomycetales
- Family: Trapeliaceae
- Genus: Trapelia
- Species: T. thieleana

Binomial name
- Trapelia thieleana Kantvilas, Lumbsch & Elix (2014)

Species of lichen

Trapelia thieleana is a lichenised fungus in the family, Trapeliaceae. It was first described in 2014 by the mycologists, Gintaras Kantvilas, Steven Leavitt, John Elix and Thorsten Lumbsch.

It has been found in mallee woodland, on loose stones and outcrops of ironstone, in Western Australia, and on Kangaroo Island in South Australia.

It is distinguishable from T. coarctata by the bright yellow pigment patches on its upper surface.
