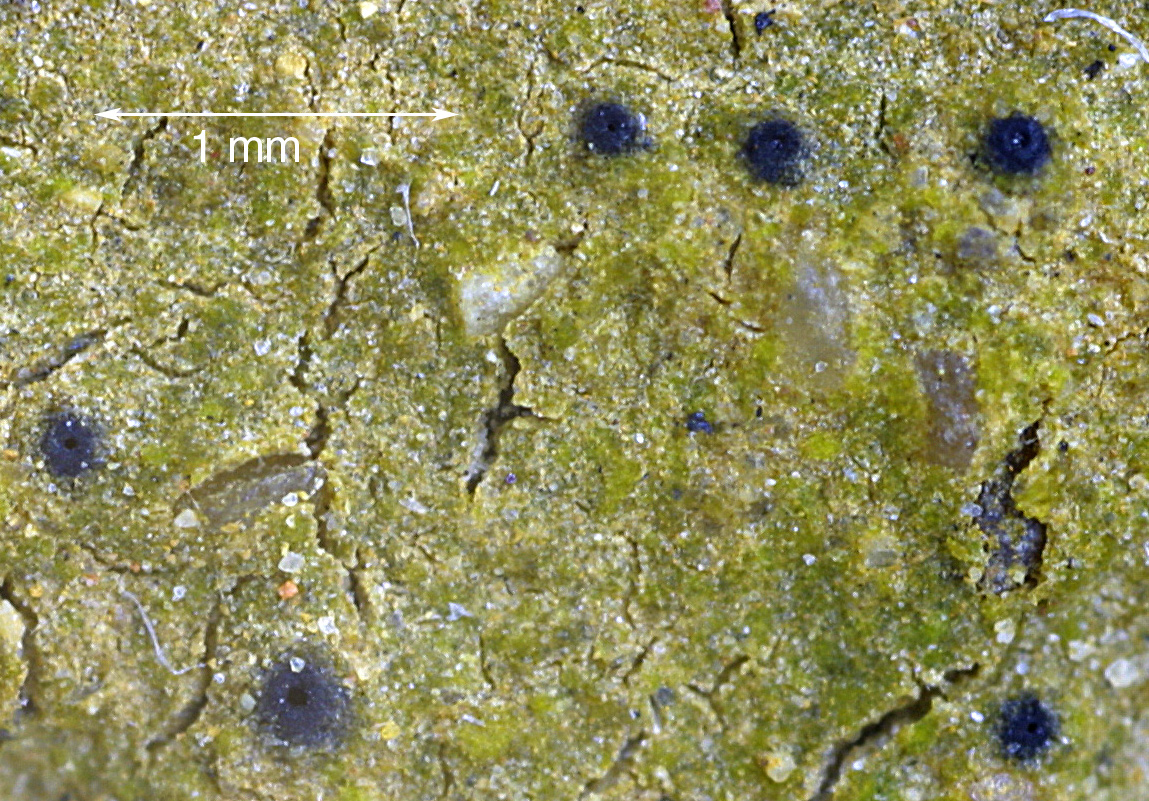
- Thrombium epigaeum

Scientific classification
- Kingdom: Fungi
- Division: Ascomycota
- Class: Lecanoromycetes
- Order: Baeomycetales
- Family: Protothelenellaceae
- Genus: Thrombium; Wallr. (1831)

Type species
- Thrombium epigaeum (Pers.) Wallr. (1831)

Species
- See text

= Thrombium =

Genus of lichen-forming fungi

Thrombium is a genus of lichen-forming fungi in the family Protothelenellaceae. The genus was established in 1831 by the German lichenologist Karl Friedrich Wilhelm Wallroth, who originally described numerous species under this name. Thrombium species are characterized by their extremely thin, often barely visible crusty thalli and tiny black fruiting bodies embedded in the substrate. These lichens grow on soil, rocks, mosses, and plant debris in various habitats around the world. The genus has undergone significant taxonomic revision over the years, with DNA studies confirming its placement in Protothelenellaceae and clarifying that some species historically assigned to Thrombium actually belong to other genera.

== Taxonomy ==
The German lichenologist Karl Friedrich Wilhelm Wallroth established the genus Thrombium in 1831, giving it the vernacular name "Pfropfflechte" ("graft-lichen"). In the protologue he grouped it with his "Pyrenocymatia" (perithecioid lichens) and defined the genus by minute, sessile, black fruiting bodies whose summit first forms a tiny papilla and then opens by a pore that exudes a whitish, drop- or thread-like mass; once discharged, the fruit becomes shallow and wrinkled. He noted the thallus as variable and often cottony with a green alga. In the same work he introduced several species under the genus, including T. punctiforme, T. asserculorum, T. bacillare, T. glaciale, T. graniferum (with several infraspecific taxa), T. incrustans, T. insculptum, T. nostoc, T. sordidum, T. spongiosum, T. velutinum, T. vermicelliferum, and T. verrucosum; he also made new combinations for previously named species such as T. corniculatum, T. graniforme, T. stigmatellum, and T. trachonum.

In 2005, a two-gene phylogeny sampling several pyrenocarpous families showed that fruiting body form is a poor guide to deep relationships: "Thrombiaceae" (Thrombium) fell within the Lecanoromycetes and formed a supported clade with Protothelenellaceae. On combined molecular and ascus-morphology evidence the authors recommended sinking Thrombiaceae into Protothelenellaceae. They also documented a shared, ring-shaped amyloid structure in the ascus apex of Protothelenella and Thrombium, contrasting it with the non-amyloid, evenly thickened asci of Verrucariaceae, Strigulaceae, and Pyrenulaceae (placed in Chaetothyriomycetes). The deeper placement of the Protothelenellaceae + Thrombium lineage remained ambiguous between positions near Ostropales (in the loose sense) and Agyriales, depending on the substitution model used.

Broader molecular treatments of Verrucariaceae resolved four principal lineages and showed that several long-used genera are not monophyletic; traditional characters such as ascospore septation and the presence or absence of hymenial algae proved to be homoplastic. In older classification schemes, Thrombium was sometimes listed among verrucarioid genera of Verrucariaceae, indicative of a wider circumscription used at the time.

A 2015 reappraisal of arthoniaceous lichens with white, powdery asexual structures resurrected and lectotypified the genus Inoderma with I. byssaceum, and showed—using morphology, chemistry, and multilocus phylogeny—that the pruinose, pycnidia-bearing taxa sit in Arthoniaceae (with the then-newly described Sporodophoron and Glomerulophoron covering related sporodochial lineages). Because Inoderma is the earlier name, those species are not treated in Thrombium. The name Thrombium applies to the verrucarioid lineage centred on T. epigaeum, which is now placed in Protothelenellaceae, where Thrombium is treated as one of three genera (with Protothelenella and Mycowinteria).

== Description ==
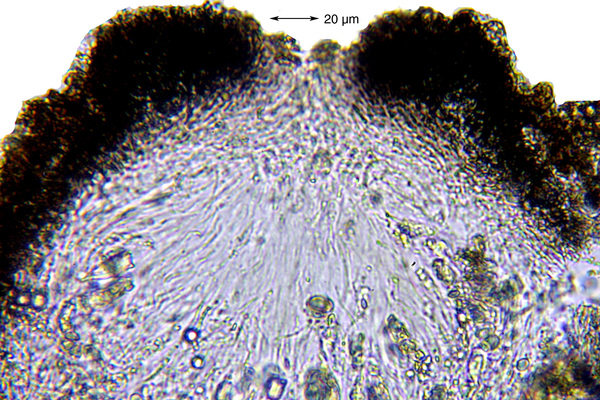
Vertical section through a perithecium of Thrombium epigaeum: a dark, pigmented wall encloses radiating hyaline paraphyses, with the ostiole at the apex. Scale bar = 20 μm.

The thallus of Thrombium lichens is crustose and usually extremely thin – more a granular or membranous film than a distinct crust. When wet it becomes slightly gelatinous, and it often spreads irregularly, remaining inconspicuous and sometimes becoming evanescent. The algal partner (photobiont) is a green alga of the genus Leptosira.

The fruiting bodies are perithecia, which are minute, flask-like structures sunk in the thallus or substrate so that only the pore (ostiole) shows at the surface as a tiny dot. They lack an involucrellum (the extra outer cap seen in some verrucarioid lichens). The perithecial wall (exciple) is brown and thickens towards the ostiole; the upper wall gives a blue-green reaction with potassium hydroxide solution (K+). Inside, the tissue between the spore sacs (the hamathecium) consists of very slender, mostly unbranched paraphyses, and the ostiolar canal lacks hair-like linings (no periphyses or periphysoids). The asci are long and narrow (cylindrical to narrowly club-shaped), thin-walled, without a distinct apical cap but with a broad, delicate ring that turns blue with the K/I iodine test; each ascus bears eight spores. The ascospores lack septa (they are aseptate), colourless, thin-walled, and lack a visible outer sheath (perispore). Asexual propagules (conidiomata) have not been observed, and no lichen substances have been detected by thin-layer chromatography.

== Species ==
- Thrombium alienellum (Nyl.) Zschacke (1934)
- Thrombium basalticum Zschacke (1934)
- Thrombium cercosporum Zahlbr. (1932)
- Thrombium deschatresii Werner (1971)
- Thrombium discordans (Nyl.) Zahlbr. (1921)
- Thrombium ebeneum Norman (1884)
- Thrombium endogaeum Oxner (1950)
- Thrombium endolithicum H.Magn. (1944)
- Thrombium epigaeum (Pers.) Wallr. (1831)
- Thrombium glaciale Wallr. (1831)
- Thrombium graniferum Wallr. (1831)
- Thrombium halophiloides (Vain.) Servít (1955)
- Thrombium kerguelanum C.W.Dodge (1948)
- Thrombium mauroides Zschacke (1934)
- Thrombium maurum Werner (1970)
- Thrombium mongolicum H.Magn. (1940)
- Thrombium nostoc Wallr. (1831)
- Thrombium porocyphoides Lettau (1940)
- Thrombium punctiforme Wallr. (1831)
- Thrombium stereocarpum J.Steiner (1896)
- Thrombium vermicelliferum Wallr. (1831)
- Thrombium viridifuscum (Eitner) Zschacke (1934)
