= Cameronia tecta =

Scientific classification
- Kingdom: Fungi
- Division: Ascomycota
- Class: Lecanoromycetes
- Order: Baeomycetales
- Family: Cameroniaceae
- Genus: Cameronia
- Species: C. tecta

Binomial name
- Cameronia tecta Kantvilas (2011)
- Type locality: Sentinel Range summit, Tasmania

Species of lichen-forming fungus

Cameronia tecta is a species of crustose lichen in the family Cameroniaceae. It forms a thin to moderately thick, pale beige-brown to greyish-brown crust on rock, typically found in sheltered crevices and overhangs. Unlike the related Cameronia pertusarioides, which grows on exposed dolerite, this species occurs on quartzite and other metamorphic rocks. It is known only from alpine sites in southwestern Tasmania.

== Taxonomy ==
Cameronia tecta was described in 2012 by Gintaras Kantvilas as one of two species placed in that newly erected genus. In the protologue, Cameronia was treated as most likely belonging to the subclass Ostropomycetidae (class Lecanoromycetes), but its position was considered uncertain on morphology alone. DNA sequence data supported the monophyly of Cameronia and its placement within Ostropomycetidae, while leaving its closest relatives unresolved. Because Cameronia lacks clear close relatives in the available phylogeny and differs morphologically from other perithecioid lineages in Ostropomycetidae, H. Thorsten Lumbsch and co-authors proposed the family Cameroniaceae for the genus. The epithet tecta means "concealed" and refers to the species' tendency to grow hidden in rock clefts and under overhangs.

== Description ==
The lichen forms a thin to moderately thick crust (thallus) that is pale beige-brown to mottled greyish-brown or yellowish-brown. Thalli are irregular in outline, can reach about 10 cm across, and are usually deeply cracked, while the surface is otherwise mostly smooth. The thallus is typically 0.2–0.5 mm thick and is often poorly delimited, though it may have a blackish, prothallus-like leading edge. It has a discontinuous epinecral layer about 5–20 micrometres (μm) thick, and a white to orange-brown, chalky medulla that contains minute crystals visible under polarised light. The photobiont (photosynthetic partner) is a coccoid green alga. The thallus is UV− (it does not fluoresce under long-wave ultraviolet light).

The fruiting bodies are immersed, perithecioid perithecia that occur in the thickest parts of the thallus and are often clustered together. Externally, they are usually indicated only by tiny greyish-black surface depressions around the ostiole, about 0.05–0.1 mm wide. The perithecia are more or less spherical and about (120–)160–280 μm wide, with a brownish excipulum about 10–20 μm thick and no involucrellum. Paraphysoids are about 1–2 μm thick, and the hymenial gel contains scattered oil droplets (to about 16 μm in diameter) and some algal cells. The asci occur in small clusters (typically 4–7), are four-spored, and measure about 90–140 × 35–60 μm. The ascospores are hyaline and muriform, broadly ellipsoid to ovate (often slightly tapered at one end), measuring about 34–78 × 22–36 μm.

Asexual reproduction occurs via immersed pycnidia about 200–250 μm wide, which may form small swellings with minute, dark speck-like ostioles. The conidia are mostly bacilliform and measure about 6–8 × 1 μm. Chemically, the species contains an unknown compound interpreted as a triphenyl (detectable by thin-layer chromatography as a slow-moving, colourless spot), and its UV spectrum and chromatographic behaviour were reported as resembling deacetylbutlerin A.

== Habitat and distribution ==
Cameronia tecta is known only from Tasmania and is restricted to the south-west of the island. It is an alpine, rock-dwelling species that occurs on Precambrian quartzites and other metamorphosed sedimentary rocks rather than on dolerite. The species is usually found in sheltered crevices, clefts and underhangs on boulders and outcrops, which can make it easy to overlook in the field. The type collection is from the summit of the Sentinel Range, where it grew in sheltered crevices and overhangs on alpine quartzite boulders at about 880 m altitude. One recorded collection came from shaded, seasonally inundated rocks at the edge of an alpine lake.
