= Hymenelia grossa =

Scientific classification
- Domain: Eukaryota
- Kingdom: Fungi
- Division: Ascomycota
- Class: Lecanoromycetes
- Order: Baeomycetales
- Family: Hymeneliaceae
- Genus: Hymenelia
- Species: H. grossa

Binomial name
- Hymenelia grossa Aptroot & K.H.Moon (2014)

Species of lichen

Hymenelia grossa is a species of saxicolous (rock-dwelling), crustose lichen in the family Hymeneliaceae. Found in Korea, it was formally described as a new species in 2014 by lichenologists André Aptroot and Kwang-Hee Moon. The type specimen was collected by the first author from Mt. Palyeoung, (Jeomam-myeoun, South Jeolla Province) at an altitude between 50 and 430 m (160 and 1,410 ft); there it was found growing on siliceous rock. The lichen has a whitish-grey, crust-like thallus that covers areas of up to 50 cm (20 in). It does not have any positive reaction to common chemical spot tests; thin layer chromatographic analysis suggests the presence of the lichen product known as confluentic acid. In the area of its type locality, it is one of the most common saxicolous lichen species. It often grows alongside members of the crustose lichen genus Circinaria.
