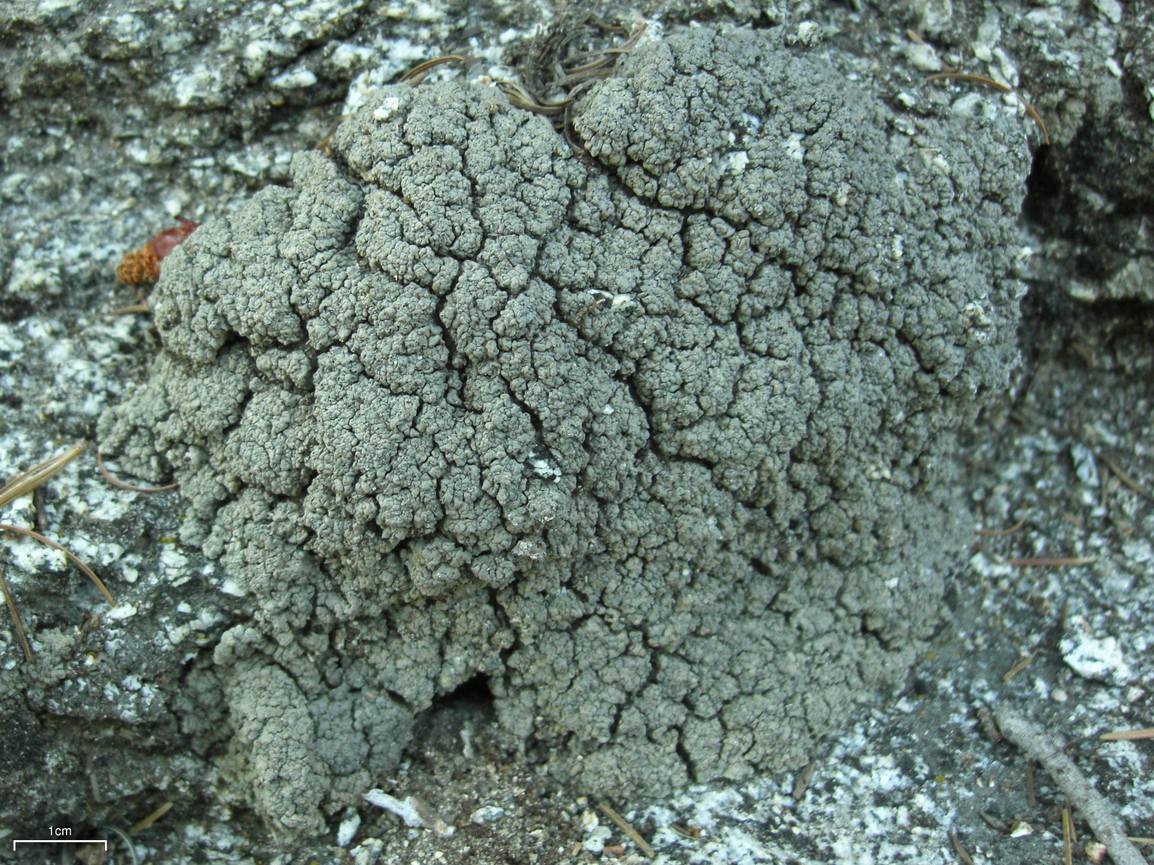
- on Mount Wilson, California

Conservation status
- Vulnerable (NatureServe)

Scientific classification
- Kingdom: Fungi
- Division: Ascomycota
- Class: Lecanoromycetes
- Order: Baeomycetales
- Family: Trapeliaceae
- Genus: Trapeliopsis
- Species: T. steppica

Binomial name
- Trapeliopsis steppica McCune & F.J.Camacho (2002)

= Trapeliopsis steppica =

Species of lichen

Trapeliopsis steppica is a species of squamulose lichen in the family Trapeliaceae. It is found in the western United States, where it grows on soil in grassland and in shrub–steppe.

== Taxonomy ==
The lichen was formally described as a new species in 2003 by Bruce McCune and Francisco Camacho. The type specimen was collected from Horse Heaven Hills in Benton County, Washington. Here it was found growing on soil in a bunchgrass (bluebunch wheatgrass, Pseudoroegneria spicata) steppe. This habitat is alluded to in its specific epithet, steppica.

== Description ==
Trapeliopsis steppica has a squamulose (scaly) thallus that is light- to medium-gray in color. The individuals squamules comprising the thallus are rounded to elongated, 0.15–0.50 mm thick and 0.5–1.5 mm long. Soredia are usually present on the thallus surface; they are dark gray to greenish-black to black, organized into regions of rounded soralia.

Although morphologically similar to Trapeliopsis californica, T. steppica can be distinguished from that species by the presence of soralia that is dark and rounded, and a thinner upper cortex.

== Habitat and distribution ==
In addition to Washington, Trapeliopsis steppica has also been recorded from eastern Idaho south to southern California, in grassland and in shrub–steppe. It is most common in areas that have been little affected by grazing. The lichen has also been reported as a common lichen component of the biological soil crust of sagebrush habitats in southwest Idaho.
