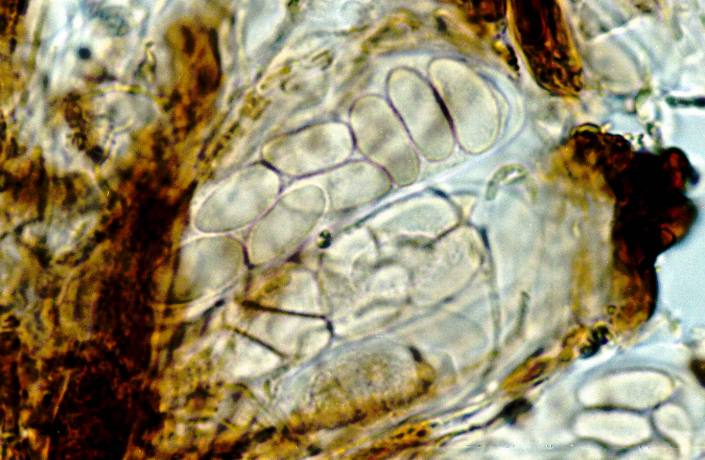
- An ascus from an apothecium of Placynthiella oligotropha

Scientific classification
- Kingdom: Fungi
- Division: Ascomycota
- Class: Lecanoromycetes
- Order: Baeomycetales
- Family: Trapeliaceae
- Genus: Placynthiella; Elenkin (1909)

Type species
- Placynthiella arenicola Elenkin (1909)

Synonyms
- Saccomorpha Elenkin (1912)

= Placynthiella =

Genus of lichen-forming fungi

Placynthiella is a genus of lichen-forming fungi in the family Trapeliaceae. The genus has a complex naming history involving multiple independent descriptions by different scientists between 1909 and 1939, with the current accepted name dating to the earliest valid publication by Alexander Elenkin. These lichens form thin, dark green-brown crusts that blend closely with their growing surfaces, making them challenging to spot in the field on acidic soils, decaying wood, and bark. The genus is distinguished from similar lichen groups by its distinctive brown, brick-like fruiting body margins and branched internal structures that end in dark, swollen tips.

== Taxonomy ==
The genus was circumscribed by the Russian lichenologist Alexander Elenkin in 1909, with Placynthiella arenicola designated as the type species. Elenkin's description was based on specimens he collected during a biological expedition to Lake Seliger in the Tver Governorate (now Tver Oblast) in the summer of 1908, and his work was published as part of a preliminary report on this expedition. The nomenclatural history of the genus is complex, involving multiple independent descriptions and subsequent taxonomic revisions. In 1912, Elenkin created the genus name Saccomorpha for the same group, but this name is illegitimate under botanical nomenclature rules as it is a later synonym. The Hungarian lichenologist Vilmos Kőfaragó-Gyelnik independently described Placynthiella in 1939, unaware of Elenkin's earlier 1909 publication. Gyelnik's concept was based on a different type species (Placynthiella perfurfurea, now known as P. icmalea), making it a later homonym despite being taxonomically congeneric with Elenkin's genus.

The taxonomic confusion was further compounded when Coppins and James (1984) adopted Gyelnik's 1939 name for what they called the "Lecidea uliginosa-group," initially overlooking both Elenkin's 1909 Placynthiella and his 1912 Saccomorpha. Josef Hafellner had earlier (1984) resurrected the name Saccomorpha for this group. However, subsequent nomenclatural analysis established that Placynthiella Elenkin (1909) has priority and serves as the correct name for the genus, with both Saccomorpha Elenkin and Placynthiella Gyelnik treated as synonyms.

The genus contains species previously classified in Lecidea, and examination of type specimens has revealed that some species concepts required revision. For example, Placynthiella arenicola, long considered a synonym of P. uliginosa, was found upon examination of isotype material to actually represent P. hyporhoda.

== Description ==
Placynthiella produces a thin, spread-out crust that blends closely with its substrate. The thallus is sub-gelatinous and made up of tiny, grain-like packets of algal cells called goniocysts; these may appear as minute granules or as slightly swollen, isidia-like protrusions that aid fragmentation and dispersal. Viewed in the field the surface is usually dark green-brown, sometimes with a reddish or chestnut tinge, and is only weakly cracked into small irregular patches (areoles). Each granular unit carries a protective outer rind of brown-walled, brick-like fungal cells (pseudoparenchyma) that grades inward to colourless hyphae. The photosynthetic partner is a green alga of the Pseudochlorella or Radiococcus type.

The reproductive bodies are tiny, flattened to slightly raised discs (apothecia) that mature from red-brown to black. They lack a thalline margin, so the observable rim is the true exciple—a ring of brown, brick-like fungal tissue that curves inward when young and may splay back slightly with age. Internally the apothecia are uniformly brown. The uppermost layer (epithecium) is dark brown, embedded in a gel that stains green-blue with iodine, while the spore-bearing layer (hymenium) is a paler brown. Slender paraphyses thread the hymenium; these often branch and end in swollen, dark-capped tips. The asci are cylindrical-to-club-shaped, contain eight ascospores each and conform to the "Trapelia type" recognised by lichenologists. Spores are mostly single-celled (rarely with one septum), ellipsoidal and typically hold one large oil droplet alongside several smaller ones; they lack any surrounding mucilaginous sheath.

Asexual reproduction occurs in blackish, globose pycnidia that release rod-shaped conidia produced on branched internal stalks. Chemical analysis reveals either simple orcinol-type depsides or no detectable lichen products. Ecologically, Placynthiella favours acidic settings—especially peaty soils, decaying wood and bark, and, less often, siliceous rock—where its dark thallus can make field detection challenging. Spot tests for chemical reactions therefore need to be done on thin sections or on material transferred to filter paper. The genus stands apart from superficially similar Trapelia and Trapeliopsis by its brown, brick-like exciple and the paraphyses that end in irregularly swollen, dark caps.

== Species ==
As of January 2026, Species Fungorum (in the Catalogue of Life) accept eight species of Placynthiella.

- Placynthiella arenicola Elenkin (1909)
- Placynthiella borsodensis Gyeln. (1939)
- Placynthiella dasaea (Stirt.) Tønsberg (1992)
- Placynthiella hurii S.Y.Kondr. & Lőkös (2017)
- Placynthiella hyporhoda (Th.Fr.) Coppins & P.James (1984)
- Placynthiella icmalea (Ach.) Coppins & P.James (1984)
- Placynthiella knudsenii Lendemer (2004) – North America
- Placynthiella oligotropha (J.R.Laundon) Coppins & P.James (1984)
- Placynthiella uliginosa (Schrad.) Coppins & P.James (1984)
