= Eiglera =

Scientific classification
- Domain: Eukaryota
- Kingdom: Fungi
- Division: Ascomycota
- Class: Lecanoromycetes
- Order: Acarosporales
- Family: Eigleraceae; Hafellner (1984)
- Genus: Eiglera; Hafellner (1984)

Type species
- Eiglera flavida (Hepp ex Kremp.) Hafellner (1984)

Species
- E. flavida E. homalomorpha

Genus of lichens

Eiglera is a small genus of rock-dwelling crustose lichens belonging to the monotypic family Eigleraceae. Eiglera species are found in Europe and Northern America.

== Taxonomy ==
The genus was circumscribed by the lichenologist Josef Hafellner in 1984, with Eiglera flavida assigned as the type species; this lichen had previously been classified in either Aspicilia or Lecanora. The genus name Eiglera honours the German botanist Gerhard Eigler. Eiglera is distinguished from the otherwise similar genus Hymenelia by the structure of its ascus dome.

== Description ==
Eiglera forms a thin, crust-like thallus that grows tightly attached to the substrate. Its photosynthetic partner consists of minute, spherical green algal cells (a chlorococcoid photobiont). The sexual reproductive bodies (apothecia) sit largely buried within the thallus and resemble those of Aspicilia. Only the uppermost rim of the apothecial wall (exciple) is visible, appearing dark blue-green against the thallus surface.

Inside each apothecium, slender, septate paraphyses are sparsely branched; their tips may broaden slightly into a club shape but lack any pigmented caps. The asci contain eight ascospores and are broadly club-shaped (clavate) to ellipsoidal. Both the apex of the ascus and a fuzzy outer coating stain blue in the standard potassium iodide (K/I) stain, forming a conspicuous dome and cap. The resulting ascospores are single-celled, colourless, smooth-walled and lack any thickened outer layer. Asexual propagation occurs through immersed, blackish pycnidia whose walls share the blue-green tint of the exciple. Within each pycnidium, bottle-shaped conidiogenous cells line up in a single row and produce rod-shaped, colourless conidia that are also single-celled. Thin-layer chromatography has not revealed any secondary lichen products in this genus.

== Species ==
- Eiglera flavida (Hepp ex Kremp.) Hafellner (1984)
- Eiglera homalomorpha (Nyl.) Clauzade & Cl.Roux (2001)
