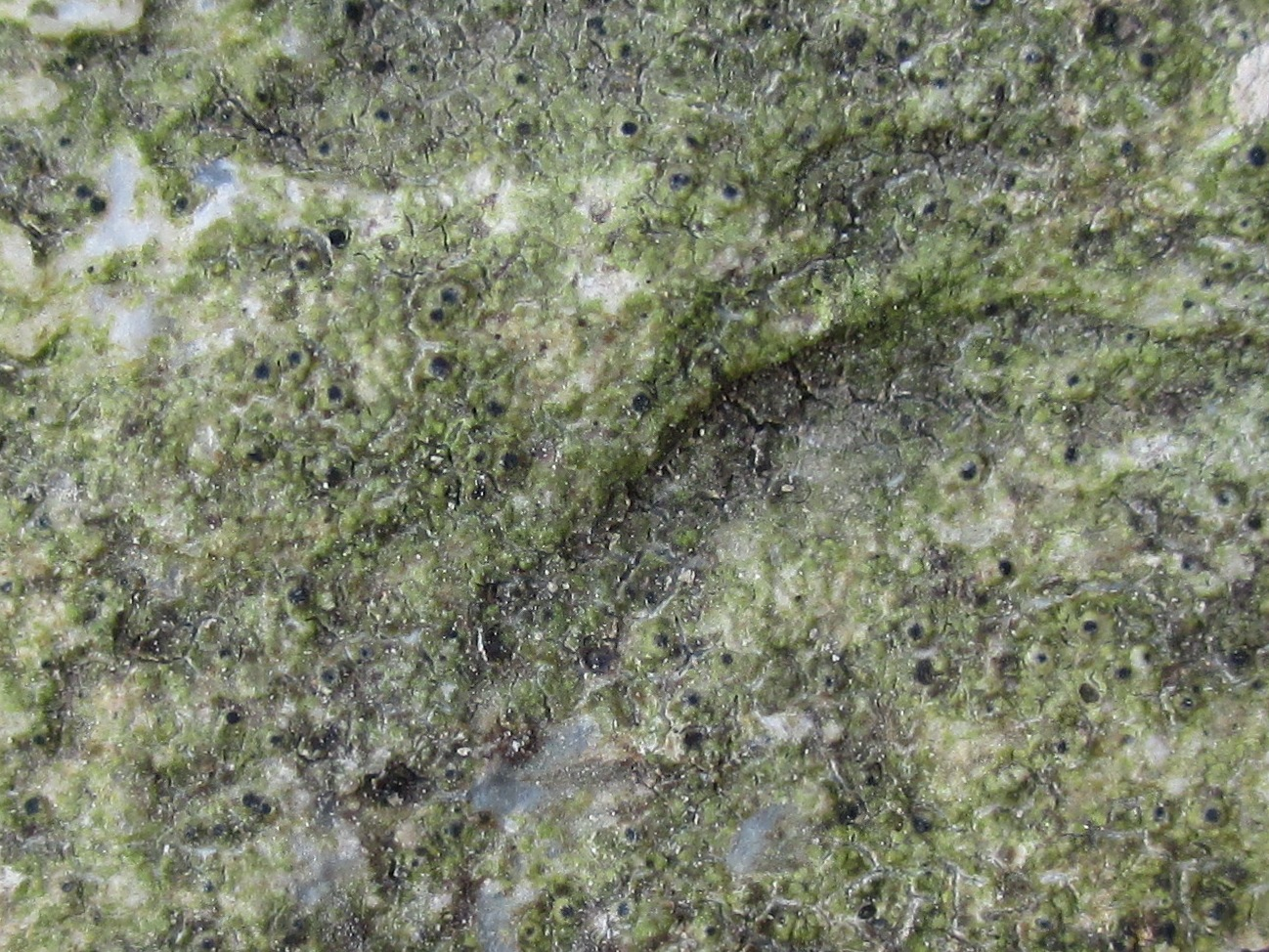
- Protothelenella corrosa

Scientific classification
- Kingdom: Fungi
- Division: Ascomycota
- Class: Lecanoromycetes
- Order: Baeomycetales
- Family: Protothelenellaceae; Vězda, H.Mayrhofer & Poelt (1985)

Type genus
- Protothelenella Räsänen (1943)

Genera
- Mycowinteria; Protothelenella; Thrombium

Synonyms
- Thrombiaceae Poelt & Vězda ex J.C.David & D.Hawksw. (1991)

= Protothelenellaceae =

Family of lichen-forming fungi

The Protothelenellaceae are a family of mostly lichen-forming fungi in the order Baeomycetales. The family was established in 1985 and includes three genera with about 22 species worldwide. These fungi typically form thin crusts on rocks, soil, mosses, plant debris, or wood, and are found on nearly every continent. Most family members produce flask-shaped fruiting bodies embedded in their crusty thalli, with spores that have internal dividing walls. The family's evolutionary relationships have been debated, with some scientists arguing whether certain genera should be separated into their own family. DNA studies have helped clarify these relationships, though the exact position of Protothelenellaceae within the larger fungal tree of life remains not yet fully resolved.

== Taxonomy ==
The family Protothelenellaceae was erected in 1985 by the lichenologists Antonín Vězda, Helmut Mayrhofer, and Josef Poelt to contain the type genus, Protothelenella. In an early (2005) two-locus analysis of pyrenocarpous lichens, Schmitt, Mueller and Lumbsch sequenced nuLSU and mtSSU rDNA and re-examined ascus structure, recovering Protothelenellaceae, Thelenellaceae and Thrombiaceae within Lecanoromycetes; Thelenellaceae formed a well-supported sister group to Ostropales (in the loose sense), whereas Protothelenella and Thrombium clustered together. On the combined molecular and morphological evidence, especially the shared ring-shaped amyloid apical structures of the asci, the authors proposed reducing Thrombiaceae to synonymy with Protothelenellaceae. They also noted that the broader placement of this clade within the class was unresolved and sensitive to model choice and base-composition heterogeneity (alternative placements near Ostropales s.l. vs Agyriales), and cautioned that ascoma morphology is homoplasious and unreliable as a sole guide at these ranks.

In a broad eight-locus phylogeny of Ostropomycetidae, Protothelenellaceae resolved as an unresolved sister lineage to the Ostropales; together they formed a clade reciprocally monophyletic to a trapelioid + Baeomycetaceae–Arctomiaceae–Hymeneliaceae assemblage, indicating that the backbone around the family's placement remained weakly resolved at that time. In the same study, SOWH tests (a statistical check on tree topology) rejected trapelioids as the sister group to Ostropales and could not exclude placements next to Baeomycetaceae or Hymeneliaceae, so the deeper relationships in this part of the phylogenetic tree remain uncertain. Resl and colleagues also recovered Anzina + Protothelenella as a supported grouping and recommended re-examining Schmitt and colleagues' 2005 synonymy of Thrombiaceae with Protothelenellaceae with denser sampling near the base of the Ostropales.

Under a temporal-banding revision of Lecanoromycetes, Protothelenellaceae was placed in Baeomycetales, within which the formerly recognised orders Arctomiales, Hymeneliales, and Trapeliales were reduced to synonymy; in the same framework Thrombiaceae is treated as a synonym of Protothelenellaceae. The multi-locus chronogram used to set ranks recovers Protothelenellaceae as closely related to Arthrorhaphidaceae, whereas relationships among the remaining baeomycetoid families are largely unresolved; the baeomycetoid assemblage containing Protothelenellaceae is sister to a clade of core Pertusariales (Pertusariaceae with the Agyriaceae–Miltideaceae lineage). Finally, the rank changes are justified by explicit divergence-time bands, with orders corresponding to crown ages of about 176–194 Ma and families to 111–135 Ma.

Subsequent commentary cautions against treating divergence-time bands as decisive for rank limits. In a critical review, Robert Lücking accepted only parts of the temporal framework (including the sinking of Arctomiales, Hymeneliales and Trapeliales into Baeomycetales) but rejected others relevant here: he does not accept merging Thrombiaceae into Protothelenellaceae, arguing this conflicts with multilocus topologies and recommending that Thrombiaceae be retained as separate. He further treats temporal banding as a subsidiary tool – used alongside diagnosable phenotypic disparity and branch-length structure and mainly above family level – rather than as a stand-alone rule for family limits.

== Description ==
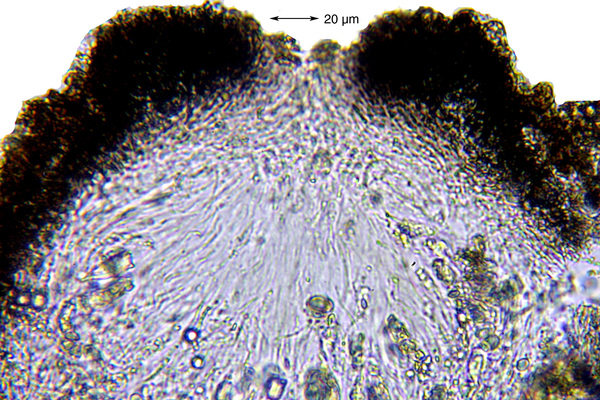
Vertical section through a perithecium of Thrombium epigaeum: a dark, pigmented wall encloses radiating hyaline paraphyses, with the ostiole at the apex. Scale bar = 20 μm.

Members of Protothelenellaceae are primarily lichen-forming fungi, forming a partnership with green algae, but a few are known to live on other lichens (lichenicolous) or as simple decomposers of dead material (saprotrophic). The thallus, when present, is crustose, forming a thin, paint-like crust on the substrate. The photosynthetic partner is a small, spherical green alga (chlorococcoid), typically from the genus Elliptochloris.

The sexual fruiting bodies are perithecioid in form (flask-shaped structures sunk into the thallus) and they lack an outer carbonised sheath (an involucrellum). Inside, the fruiting cavity is filled with fine threads (the hamathecium) of paraphyses that may branch and fuse. The ascus apex bears an iodine-positive (amyloid) tholus. The asci are thin-walled and club-shaped, with a blue-staining cap at the tip (an amyloid tholus) and a shallow, eye-like chamber beneath it. Each ascus typically contains six to eight colourless ascospores that are spindle-shaped (fusiform) to ellipsoid and divided by true internal walls (septa); septation ranges from a few cross-walls to a brick-like, multi-walled pattern (muriform). The internal walls are thin, while the outer spore wall is comparatively thick. Asexual fruiting bodies (conidiomata) have not been observed, and no characteristic lichen substances have been detected in the family.

== Distribution ==
Collectively, the family has a nearly cosmopolitan distribution. Protothelenellaceae species grow on acidic rocks and soil, bryophytes and detritus, wood, or other lichens.

== Genera ==
The "2024 Outline of Fungi and fungus-like taxa" accepts 3 genera and about 22 species in the Protothelenellaceae:

- Mycowinteria Sherwood (1986) – 1 sp.
- Protothelenella Räsänen (1943) – 6 spp.
- Thrombium Wallr. – ca. 15 spp.
