= Cameronia pertusarioides =

Scientific classification
- Kingdom: Fungi
- Division: Ascomycota
- Class: Lecanoromycetes
- Order: Baeomycetales
- Family: Cameroniaceae
- Genus: Cameronia
- Species: C. pertusarioides

Binomial name
- Cameronia pertusarioides Kantvilas (2011)
- Type locality: Hartz Mountains, Tasmania

Species of lichen-forming fungus

Cameronia pertusarioides is a species of crustose lichen in the small family Cameroniaceae. It forms a thick, pale lemon-yellow crust on rock, often spreading into extensive patches tens of centimetres across. The species is the type of its genus, Cameronia, which was established for distinctive alpine lichens that did not fit any existing genus. It is known only from sun-exposed dolerite rock at alpine elevations in Tasmania.

== Taxonomy ==
Cameronia pertusarioides was described by Gintaras Kantvilas in 2011 as the type species of the new genus Cameronia, erected for two alpine, rock-dwelling Tasmanian species that had resisted placement in any existing genus. The genus name honours Jan Cameron for her work in Tasmanian nature conservation, while the epithet pertusarioides refers to the thallus' superficial resemblance to some warty, crustose members of Pertusaria (especially when the lichen develops prominent, ostiole-like pits and swellings).

Kantvilas initially suggested an affinity with the Ostropomycetidae (a subclass within the Lecanoromycetes), based on a mix of traits seen across that group, but he also noted that the combination of characters (deeply immersed, perithecioid fruiting bodies; thick-walled, broadly obovate asci with a hemiamyloid wall; and large, muriform ascospores) did not match any family cleanly. A later DNA-based study supported both the monophyly of Cameronia and its placement in Ostropomycetidae, while still leaving its nearest relatives uncertain. Because the genus sits in an isolated position in the available phylogeny and is morphologically distinct from other perithecioid lineages in the subclass, Lumbsch and co-authors proposed the new family Cameroniaceae for Cameronia, with no confident assignment to an existing order.

== Description ==
The lichen forms a thick, pale lemon-yellow crust (the thallus) that can spread into extensive, irregular patches (sometimes tens of centimetres across). The surface is usually smooth to slightly glossy and tends to become strongly cracked into an irregular mosaic. Thallus margins that are actively growing may be a little thickened and somewhat folded. The thallus is typically about 0.7–1 mm thick and lacks a distinct outer cortex (it is "ecorticate"). Internally, it has a white, chalky medulla packed with minute crystals; these crystals are conspicuous under polarised light and dissolve slowly in potassium hydroxide. In the field the thallus often sheds water rather than wetting easily, an effect Kantvilas linked to the dense, crystal-rich tissues.

The photobiont is a coccoid green alga. The fruiting bodies are perithecioid (flask-shaped) and are deeply embedded in the thallus, often betrayed only by tiny greyish depressions or pinhole-like perforations at the surface. Inside, the asci occur in small clusters and are four-spored; they are broadly obovate and have a strongly iodine-reactive ("hemiamyloid") outer wall but a well-developed tholus that is essentially non-amyloid. The ascospores are hyaline and muriform (divided by many cross-walls into a brick-like pattern), broadly ellipsoid to ovate, and large (about 48–72 micrometres long). Asexual reproduction occurs via immersed pycnidia that produce bacilliform to bone-shaped conidia. Chemically, the species produces the 9-O-methylpannaric acid chemosyndrome; the thallus is UV+ (bright lemon-yellow).

== Habitat and distribution ==
Cameronia pertusarioides is known only from Tasmania, where it occurs at alpine elevations on Jurassic-era dolerite. It is especially frequent on exposed rock plates and the upper surfaces of boulders in alpine heathland, where it can form broad, conspicuous patches in sites subject to wind abrasion, driving rain, snow and intense sun. It can also occur on more sheltered, vertical faces. The type collection is from the Hartz Mountains Plateau near Lake Osborne (about 890 m elevation), and additional records span multiple Tasmanian alpine summits and plateaux.

In these dolerite alpine communities, the yellow crust often forms a visual mosaic with other large, colourful crustose lichens. Kantvilas recorded it growing alongside species such as Trapelia lilacea, several Lecanora species, and with common saxicolous genera including Rhizocarpon, Umbilicaria, Stereocaulon and Placopsis. Some specific associates include Hymenelia gyalectoidea and Rimularia psephota. Black tufts of the rock-moss Andreaea may also be prominent nearby. Fertile asci appear to be uncommon in herbarium material (many collections are sterile), so field recognition usually relies on the thick, cracked, lemon-yellow thallus and the minute crater-like surface pits that mark immersed reproductive structures.
