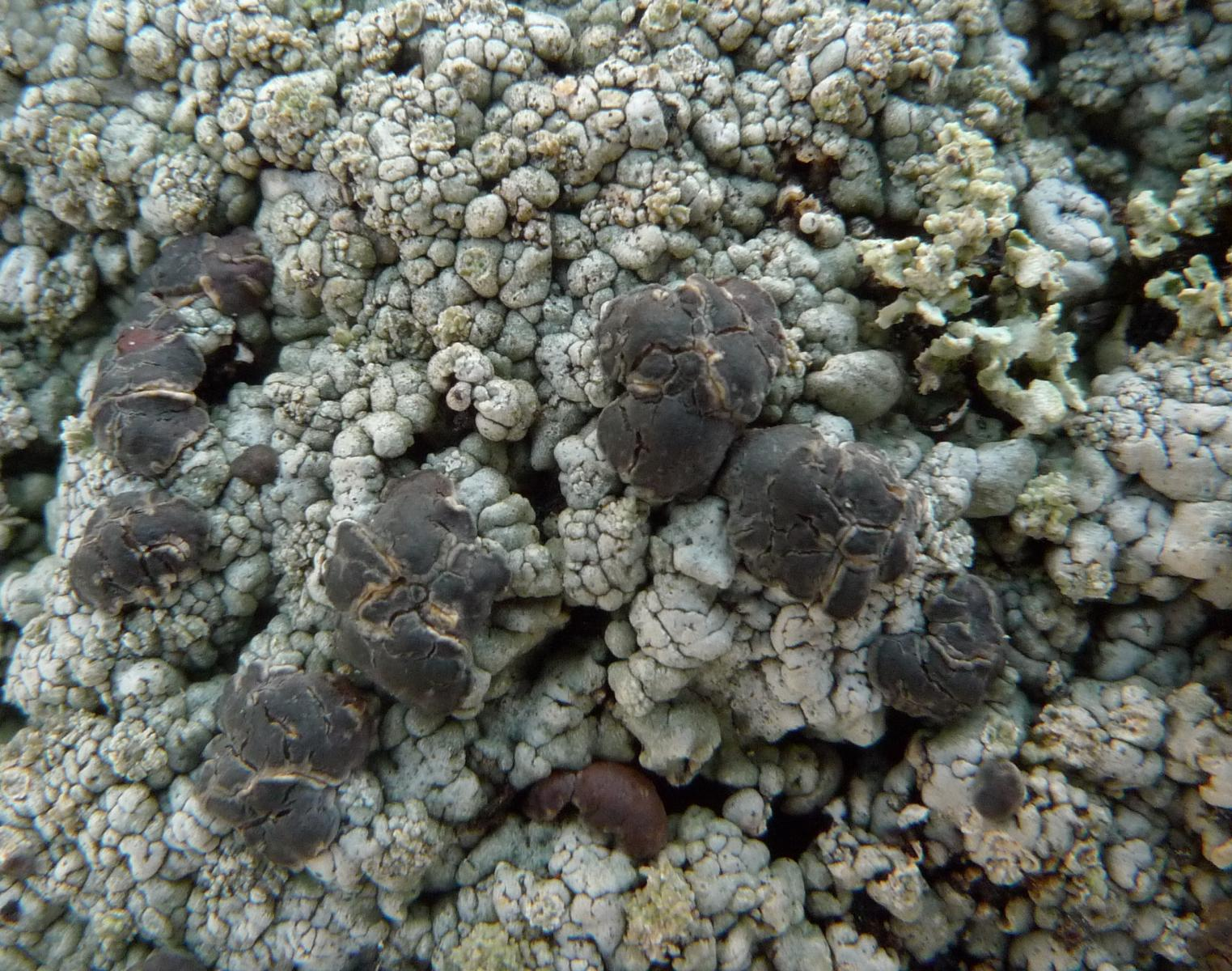
- Trapeliopsis wallrothii

Scientific classification
- Domain: Eukaryota
- Kingdom: Fungi
- Division: Ascomycota
- Class: Lecanoromycetes
- Order: Baeomycetales
- Family: Trapeliaceae
- Genus: Trapeliopsis; Hertel & Gotth.Schneid. (1980)

Type species
- Trapeliopsis wallrothii (Flörke ex Spreng.) Hertel & Gotth.Schneid. (1980)

= Trapeliopsis =

Genus of lichen

Trapeliopsis is a genus of lichen-forming fungi in the family Trapeliaceae. These lichens form thin, granular crusts or tiny overlapping scales (squamules) that create miniature rosette patterns on their growing surface. The genus was established in 1980 by Hannes Hertel and Gotthard Schneider and includes about 20 species found worldwide.

== Taxonomy ==
The genus was circumscribed in 1980 by Hannes Hertel and Gotthard Schneider, with Trapeliopsis wallrothii designated as the type species.

== Description ==
Trapeliopsis grows as a thin, granular to minutely leaf-like crust that sits close to its substrate. In some species the granules enlarge into tiny, overlapping scales (squamules) that can give the colony a miniature rosette appearance; in others the thallus remains a loose dusting of coarse grains. Only those distinctly squamulose forms develop a true upper cortex—an organised skin of tangled fungal hyphae—while the purely granular morphs have no differentiated surface layer. Throughout the thallus the photosynthetic partner is a green alga of the Chlorella or Pseudochlorella type, often dividing into clusters of two to four cells whose flattened faces make them appear slightly asymmetrical.

Reproductive structures present as low, button-like apothecia that are yellow-brown to almost black. They are slightly pinched in at the base and lie flush with the thallus surface from an early stage, expanding outward without splitting. Some species show a pronounced rim cut from thallus tissue (a thalline margin), whereas others reveal only the internal exciple—a ring of colourless fungal hyphae set in a faintly pigmented gel that never darkens to the deep brown seen in some related genera. Inside the apothecium, delicate paraphyses thread the hymenium; these filaments branch and fuse near their tips but remain narrow and usually colourless, though an external pigment coating can make the upper layer appear slightly swollen. Each thin-walled ascus holds eight smooth, ellipsoidal ascospores that stay colourless and single-celled, staining weakly or not at all with iodine (a "Trapelia-type" response).

Asexual reproduction occurs in immersed pycnidia that release rod-shaped to thread-like conidia. Chemical analyses typically detect gyrophoric acid, with traces of lecanoric acid also common. While sterile material may be difficult to separate from the superficially similar Trapelia, molecular studies show that Trapeliopsis forms a distinct evolutionary lineage, and its colourless exciple plus uniformly narrow paraphyses help distinguish it from dark-rimmed genera such as Placynthiella.

== Species ==
As of June 2025, Species Fungorum (in the Catalogue of Life) accept 16 species of Trapeliopsis.

- Trapeliopsis aeneofusca (Flörke ex Flot.) Coppins & P.James (1984)
- Trapeliopsis bisorediata McCune & F.J.Camacho (2002) – North America
- Trapeliopsis californica McCune & F.J.Camacho (2002) – North America
- Trapeliopsis colensoi (C.Bab.) Gotth.Schneid. (1980)
- Trapeliopsis congregans (Zahlbr.) Brako (1989)
- Trapeliopsis flexuosa (Fr.) Coppins & P.James (1984)
- Trapeliopsis gelatinosa (Flörke) Coppins & P.James (1984)
- Trapeliopsis glaucolepidea (Nyl.) Gotth.Schneid. (1980)
- Trapeliopsis glaucopholis (Nyl.) Printzen & McCune (2004)
- Trapeliopsis granulosa (Hoffm.) Lumbsch (1983)
- Trapeliopsis gymnidiata Aptroot & Schumm (2012) – Macaronesia
- Trapeliopsis gyrocarpa Elix (2013) – Australia
- Trapeliopsis percrenata (Nyl.) Gotth.Schneid. (1980)
- Trapeliopsis pseudogranulosa Coppins & P.James (1984) – Europe
- Trapeliopsis steppica McCune & F.J.Camacho (2002) – North America
- Trapeliopsis studerae Aptroot & M.Cáceres (2018) – Brazil
- Trapeliopsis thermophila Rambold & Elix (2013) – Australia
- Trapeliopsis viridescens (Schrad.) Coppins & P.James (1984)
- Trapeliopsis wallrothii (Flörke ex Spreng.) Hertel & Gotth. Schneid. (1980)
