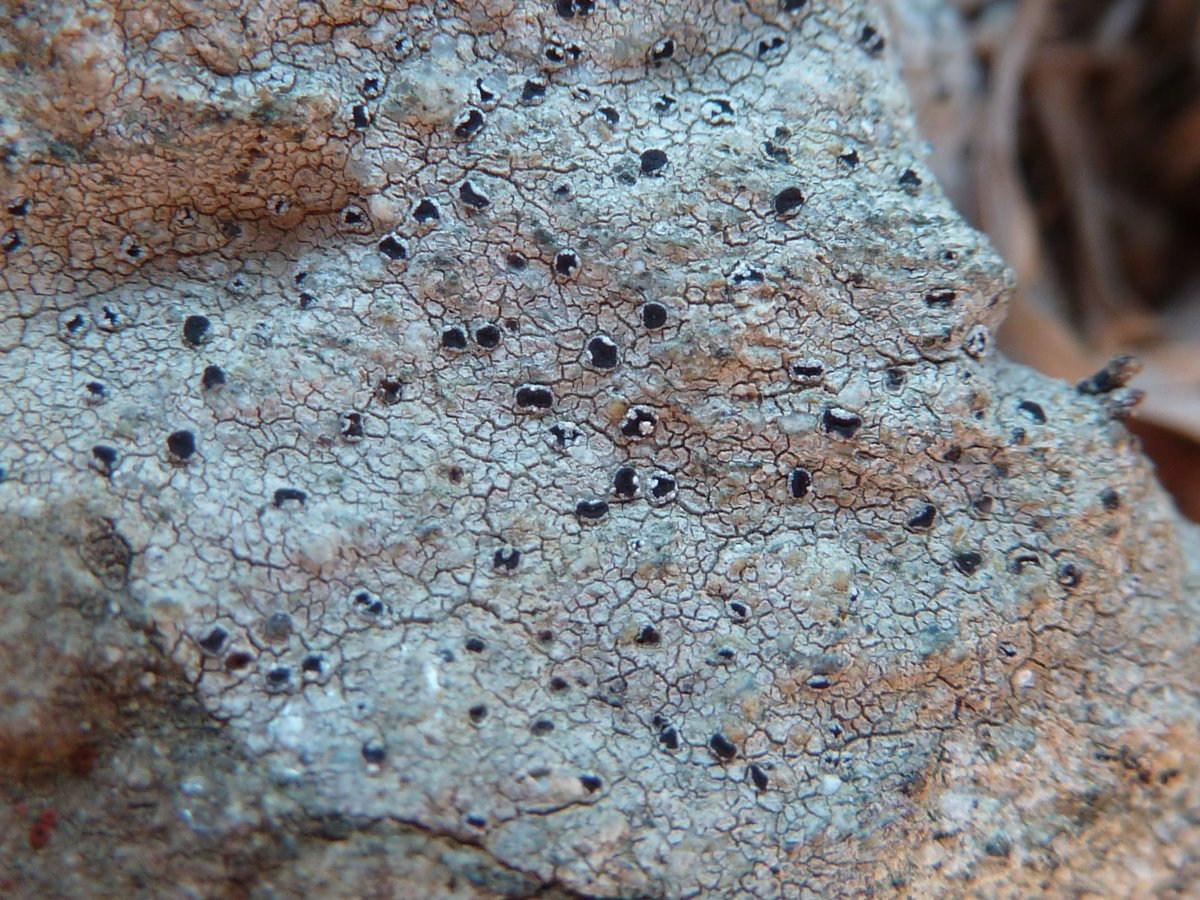

Conservation status
- Apparently Secure (NatureServe)

Scientific classification
- Kingdom: Fungi
- Division: Ascomycota
- Class: Lecanoromycetes
- Order: Baeomycetales
- Family: Trapeliaceae
- Genus: Trapelia
- Species: T. coarctata

Binomial name
- Trapelia coarctata (Turner) M.Choisy

= Trapelia coarctata =

Species of lichen

Trapelia coarctata is a lichenised fungus in the family Trapeliaceae.

It was first described as Lichen coarctatus in 1799 by Dawson Turner in Smith & Sowerby's, English Botany., and transferred to the genus Trapelia by Maurice Choisy in 1932.

It has been found in mallee woodland dry sclerophyll forest, on soil and rocks, in Western Australia, and on Kangaroo Island in South Australia. It has a continuous grey thallus, containing gyrophoric acid, and is a first coloniser after fire. It was among the first lichen species to be found on Surtsey island after its inception from the sea.
