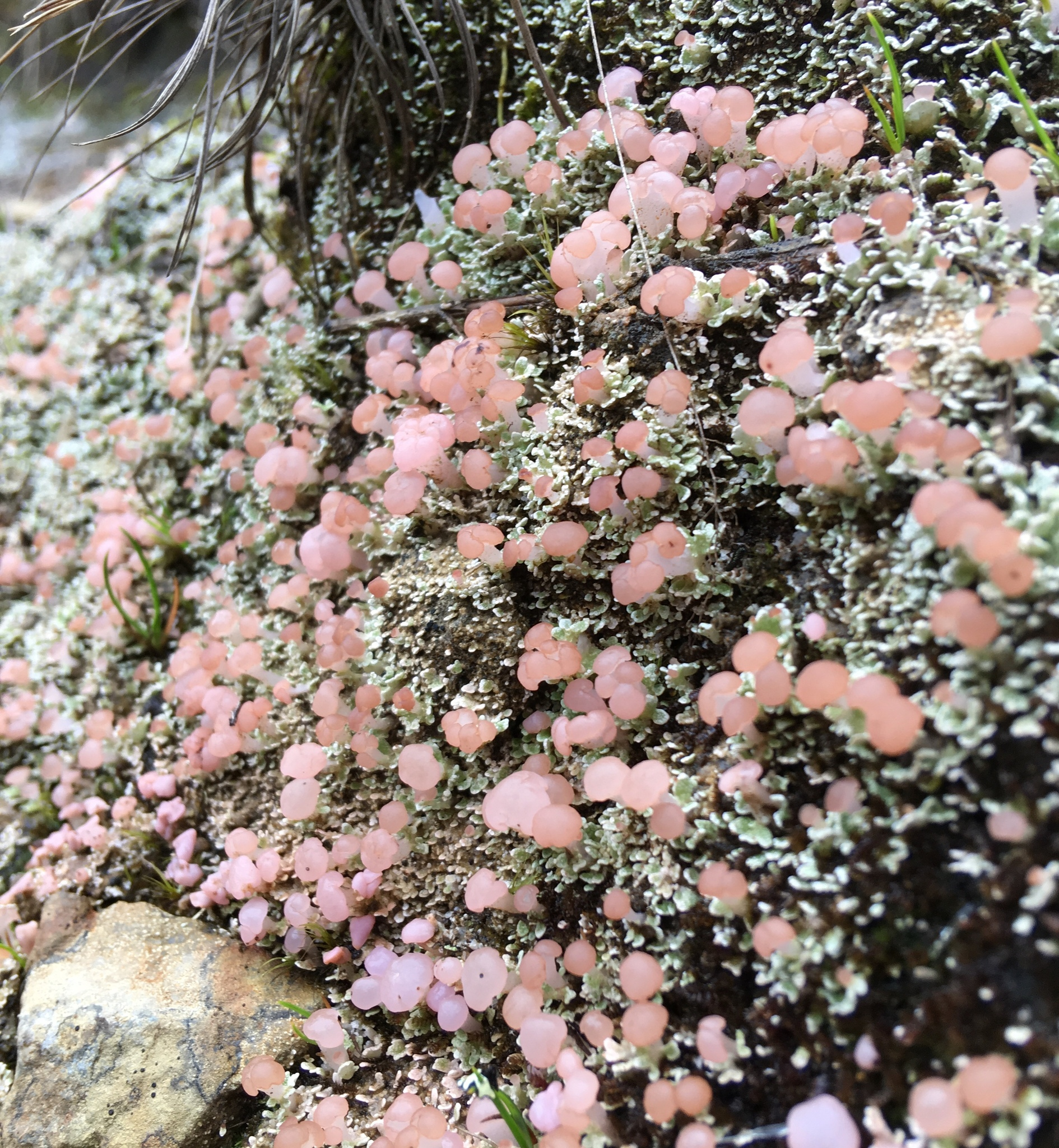
- Phyllobaeis imbricata

Scientific classification
- Domain: Eukaryota
- Kingdom: Fungi
- Division: Ascomycota
- Class: Lecanoromycetes
- Order: Baeomycetales
- Family: Baeomycetaceae
- Genus: Phyllobaeis; Kalb & Gierl (1993)

Type species
- Phyllobaeis imbricata (Hook.) Kalb & Gierl (1993)

Species
- P. crustacea P. erythrella P. imbricata P. linearis P. rhodochroa P. rubescens

= Phyllobaeis =

Genus of fungi

Phyllobaeis is a genus of lichen-forming fungi in the family Baeomycetaceae. It has six species. The genus was circumscribed by lichenologists Klaus Kalb and Claudia Gierl in 1993, with Phyllobaeis imbricata assigned as the type species. Phyllobaeis differs from Baeomyces by the production of the secondary chemical norstictic acid, as well as the tropical distribution of its species. Most species have a squamulose thallus, but the most recent addition to the genus–the Chinese species P. crustacea–has a crustose thallus.

== Species ==
- Phyllobaeis crustacea S.N.Cao & J.C.Wei (2014) – China
- Phyllobaeis erythrella (Mont.) Kalb (1993)
- Phyllobaeis imbricata (Hook.) Kalb & Gierl (1993)
- Phyllobaeis linearis (B.G.de Vries) V.Marcano & Sipman (1996)
- Phyllobaeis rhodochroa (Kremp.) Kalb (1993)
- Phyllobaeis rubescens (Vain.) Kalb (1993)
