= Cameronia (lichen) =

Scientific classification
- Domain: Eukaryota
- Kingdom: Fungi
- Division: Ascomycota
- Class: Lecanoromycetes
- Order: Baeomycetales
- Family: Cameroniaceae; Kantvilas & Lumbsch (2012)
- Genus: Cameronia; Kantvilas (2011)

Type species
- Cameronia pertusarioides Kantvilas (2011)

Species
- C. pertusarioides C. tecta

Genus of lichens

Cameronia is a genus of crustose lichens in the monotypic family Cameroniaceae. It has two species. Both the genus and its two species were described as new to science in 2011 by Australian lichenologist Gintaras Kantvilas. Characteristics of the genus include its chlorococcalean photobiont partner, and perithecioid ascomata that are deeply immersed in the substrate. Microscopic features of Cameronia include the four-spored asci with an intensely hemiamyloid outer wall and non-amyloid, well-developed tholus (the thickened inner part of the ascus tip), and hyaline, muriform ascospores (i.e., divided into multiple chambers by transverse and longitudinal septa). Both species are endemic to the Tasmanian Highlands.

The family Cameroniaceae was proposed by Kantvilas and H. Thorsten Lumbsch a year later, after molecular phylogenetic analysis showed that Cameronia belonged in the Ostropomycetidae. It was originally placed in this subclass with an uncertain (incertae sedis) ordinal position, but the Cameroniaceae is now classified in the order Baeomycetales.

== Species ==
- Cameronia pertusarioides Kantvilas (2011)
- Cameronia tecta Kantvilas (2011)
