= Mycowinteria =

Scientific classification
- Kingdom: Fungi
- Division: Ascomycota
- Class: Lecanoromycetes
- Order: Baeomycetales
- Family: Protothelenellaceae
- Genus: Mycowinteria; Sherwood (1986)

Type species
- Mycowinteria anodonta (Nyl.) Sherwood & Boise (1986)

Species
- M. alpina M. anodonta M. muriformis

Synonyms
- Trematosphaeria subgen. Winteria Rehm (1881); Winteria (Rehm) Sacc. (1883)

Genus of lichens

Mycowinteria is a small genus of fungi in the family Protothelenellaceae. The genus was established in 1986 by Martha Sherwood-Pike as a replacement name for the illegitimate Winteria, and comprises three known species found on weathered wood in Europe, Norway, Sweden, and Papua New Guinea. These fungi appear as tiny dark greenish-black spots with distinctive microscopic features including thick-walled asci that stain blue with iodine and complex grid-patterned (muriform) spores. While sometimes found growing near algae, they do not form true lichens, though their exact taxonomic placement has been debated.

== Taxonomy ==
The genus Mycowinteria was established by the lichenologist Martha Sherwood-Pike in 1986 as a new name for Winteria (Rehm) Sacc., which was illegitimate due to being predated by Winteria Sacc., an obligate synonym of Selinia Karst The genus was initially described as monotypic, containing only the type species M. anodonta. This species was originally described by William Nylander in 1869 as Odontotrema anodontum. In 2018, Josef Hafellner instead proposed reclassifying this species in Protothelenella.

The taxonomic placement of Mycowinteria is unclear, as it does not correspond well to any established family of Ascomycota. The genus is characterized by several distinctive features. It possesses thick-walled asci that are not functionally bitunicate, show diffuse blue staining in iodine, and have a broad I+ blue apical ring. The sparse, branched paraphyses have free ends, suggesting ascohymenial development. The ascospores are muriform.

While sometimes found growing in association with algae, species of Mycowinteria do not form a true lichen thallus. The genus has been suggested to be either very isolated taxonomically, or to represent a case where fundamental taxonomic characters have become modified beyond recognition from their ancestral form.

The genus can be distinguished from the similar Xylopezia by its muriform ascospores (compared to transversely septate in Xylopezia), positive iodine reaction in asci (versus iodine negative in Xylopezia), and blue-staining hymenial gel (versus non-staining in Xylopezia). Species in the genus are typically found on weathered wood, particularly in boreal and alpine areas of Europe and North America.

== Description ==
Mycowinteria species appear as tiny, scattered dark greenish-black spots that develop on bleached patches of bark-free wood. Each fungal body (known as an ascoma) is circular or slightly elongated in shape and measures 0.3–0.6 mm across. The fungal bodies begin their development completely buried within the wood, causing small swellings or pustules on the surface. Eventually, they open at maturity through a broad pore that exposes their internal spore-producing layer, which sits just slightly below the wood surface. The outer wall of the fungal body is made up of loosely interwoven fungal threads (hyphae) embedded in a greenish gel-like matrix, rather than being hard and carbonized like many related fungi.

Inside the fungal body, spores are produced in microscopic sac-like structures called asci. These asci have thick walls and a distinctive structure at their tip that stains blue when treated with iodine. Between the asci are thin, branching threads called paraphyses. Unlike many similar fungi, Mycowinteria species produce complex spores that are divided by both crosswise and lengthwise internal walls, creating a grid-like pattern (described as muriform).

While these fungi are sometimes found growing near green algae on the wood surface, they don't form a true symbiotic relationship with the algae like lichens do. This occasional association with algae may provide some nutritional benefits to the fungi, but they can grow independently as well. Josef Hafellner later called the type species "doubtfully lichenised".

== Species ==
- Mycowinteria alpina L.Holm & K.Holm (1993) – Norway; Sweden
- Mycowinteria anodonta (Nyl.) Sherwood & Boise (1986) – Europe
- Mycowinteria muriformis Aptroot (1998) – Papua New Guinea
