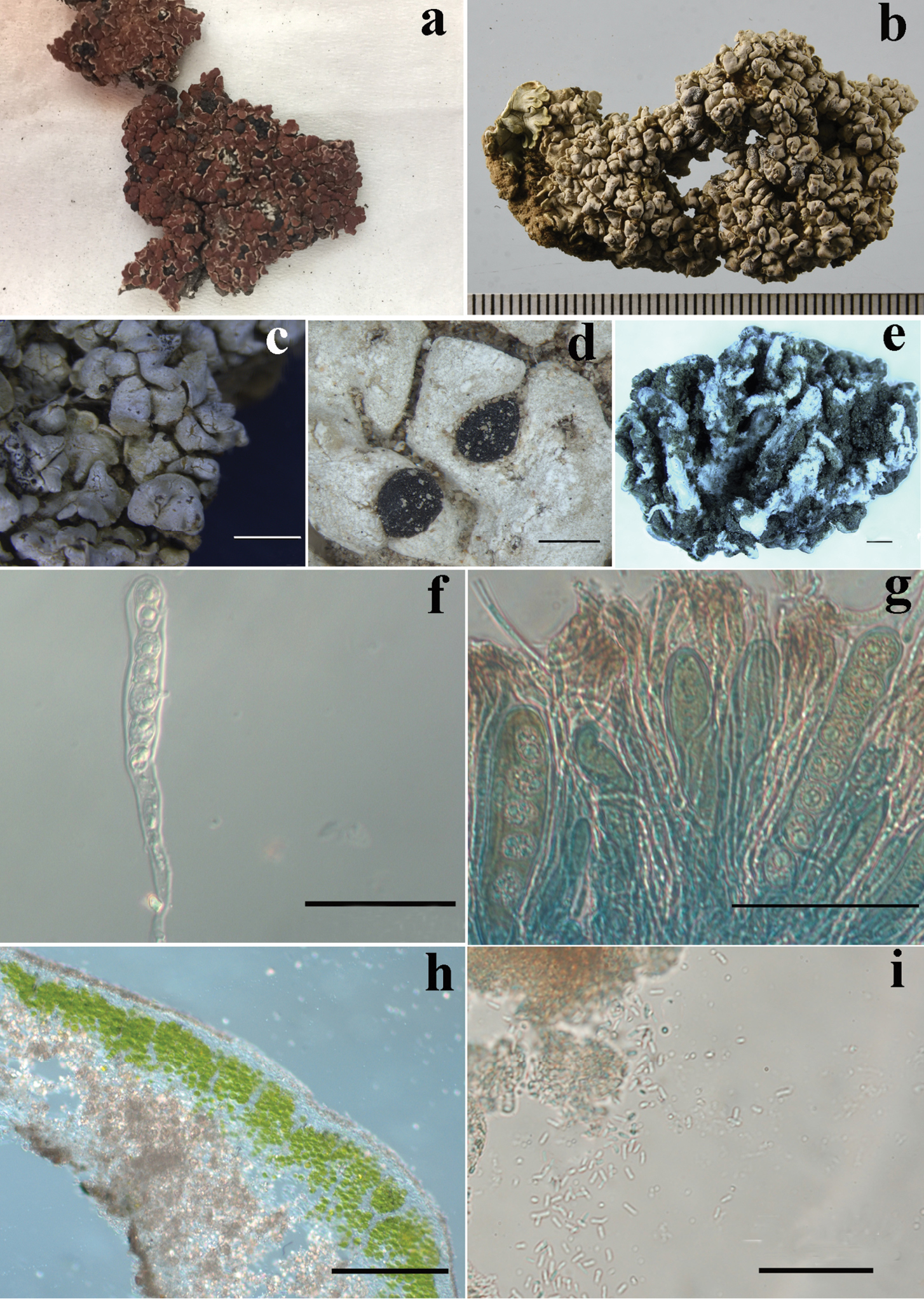
- Anamylopsora pruinosa

Scientific classification
- Kingdom: Fungi
- Division: Ascomycota
- Class: Lecanoromycetes
- Order: Baeomycetales
- Family: Baeomycetaceae
- Genus: Anamylopsora; Timdal (1991)

Type species
- Anamylopsora pulcherrima (Vain.) Timdal (1991)

Species
- A. altaica A. pruinosa A. pakistanica A. pulcherrima

= Anamylopsora =

Genus of lichenised fungi in the family Baeomycetaceae

Anamylopsora is an ascomycete genus of lichenized fungi. In 1991 the Norwegian mycologist Einar Timdal decided to create this new genus for the species previously called Lecidea pulcherrima (named by Edvard August Vainio in 1888). A monotypic family, Anamylopsoraceae, was even proposed for this taxon due to distinctive features of the asci, pycnidia and the ascoma (the fruiting bodies of sexual reproduction), but molecular phylogenetics analysis later indicated that it belongs in the Baeomycetaceae.

Later three further species, A. altaica, A. pakistanica A. pruinosa, were added to the genus and A. pruinosa remains the type species.
