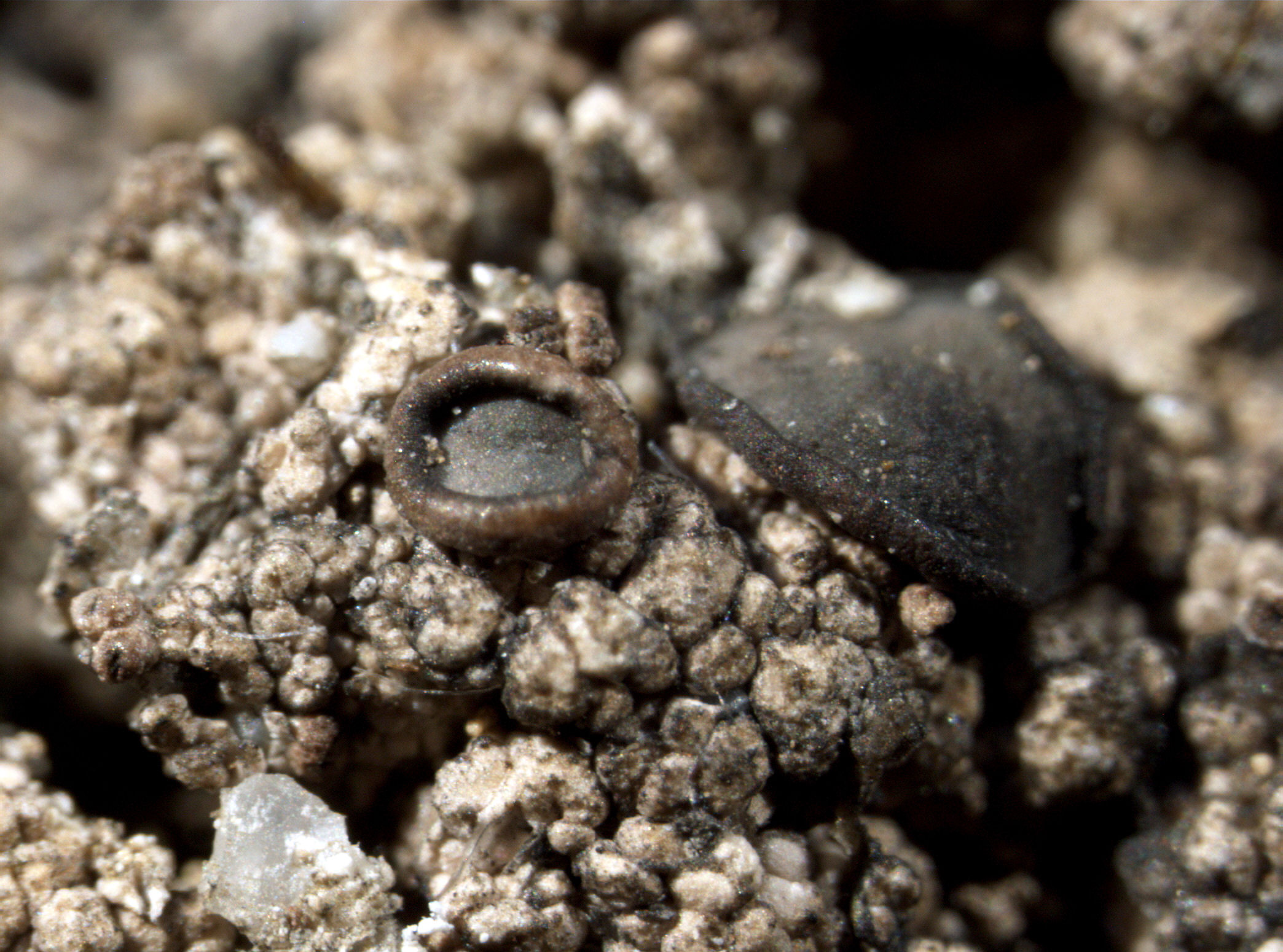
- Ainoa geochroa

Scientific classification
- Kingdom: Fungi
- Division: Ascomycota
- Class: Lecanoromycetes
- Order: Baeomycetales
- Family: Baeomycetaceae
- Genus: Ainoa; Lumbsch & I.Schmitt (2001)

Type species
- Ainoa geochroa (Körb.) Lumbsch & I.Schmitt (2001)

Species
- A. bella A. geochroa A. mooreana

= Ainoa =

Genus of fungi

Ainoa is a genus of lichens in the family Baeomycetaceae. It was named in honour of the German lichenologist Aino Henssen. These rock-dwelling lichens form thin crusts that break into small flakes and are distinguished by their abundant dark brown to black button-like fruiting bodies that sit on short stalks. The genus includes three species found in cool mountainous regions, where they grow on hard siliceous rocks and can withstand repeated cycles of wetting and drying.

== Taxonomy ==
The genus was circumscribed in 2001 by H. Thorsten Lumbsch and Imke Schmitt to contain two species that were formerly placed in genus Trapelia. A third species, Ainoa bella from eastern North America, was added to the genus in 2015.

== Description ==
Ainoa forms a thin, crust-like lichen body (thallus) that adheres tightly to bare rock. In some specimens the surface breaks along stress lines (schizidia), producing minute flakes that can act as vegetative propagules. A translucent epinecral layer of dead fungal cells coats the crust and gives it a slightly frost-like appearance, while any outer prothallus is absent. The internal photosynthetic partner is a simple, spherical green alga (a chlorococcoid photobiont) that sits just beneath the surface; this arrangement means the lichen shows no orange tint when scratched, unlike species that harbour Trentepohlia.

Fertile structures are abundant and conspicuous. Each apothecium (fruiting body) is a small, round disc that sits directly on the thallus but narrows to a stalk-like base, giving it a button-on-a-pin profile. The disc itself is dark brown to almost black, flat to slightly cupped, and surrounded by a raised margin that persists for the life of the fruit body. Supporting this margin is a cup-shaped layer (the exciple) composed of long, thick-walled hyphae that darken with age. Above the exciple lies a clear spore-bearing layer (hymenium) 90–150 μm tall; it is threaded by slender, septate filaments (paraphyses) that branch sparingly and separate readily when mounted in water, a trait that helps distinguish the genus. The asci are cylindrical, hold eight ascospores, and have a faintly blue-staining apical dome typical of the Trapelia type. Spores are narrowly ellipsoidal, colourless, and lack both internal septa and the gelatinous sheath seen in many other crustose lichens.

Ainoa also produces asexual spores in tiny flask-shaped pycnidia embedded within wart-like swellings of the thallus. These pycnidia release very small, rod-shaped conidia. Chemically the genus is simple: the only consistently detected compound is gyrophoric acid, and even that is confined to the fruit bodies and pycnidia rather than permeating the entire crust.

== Ecology ==
All known species are saxicolous, preferring hard, siliceous rock in cool, often alpine environments where periodic wetting and drying favour lichens that can cling closely to their substrate.
