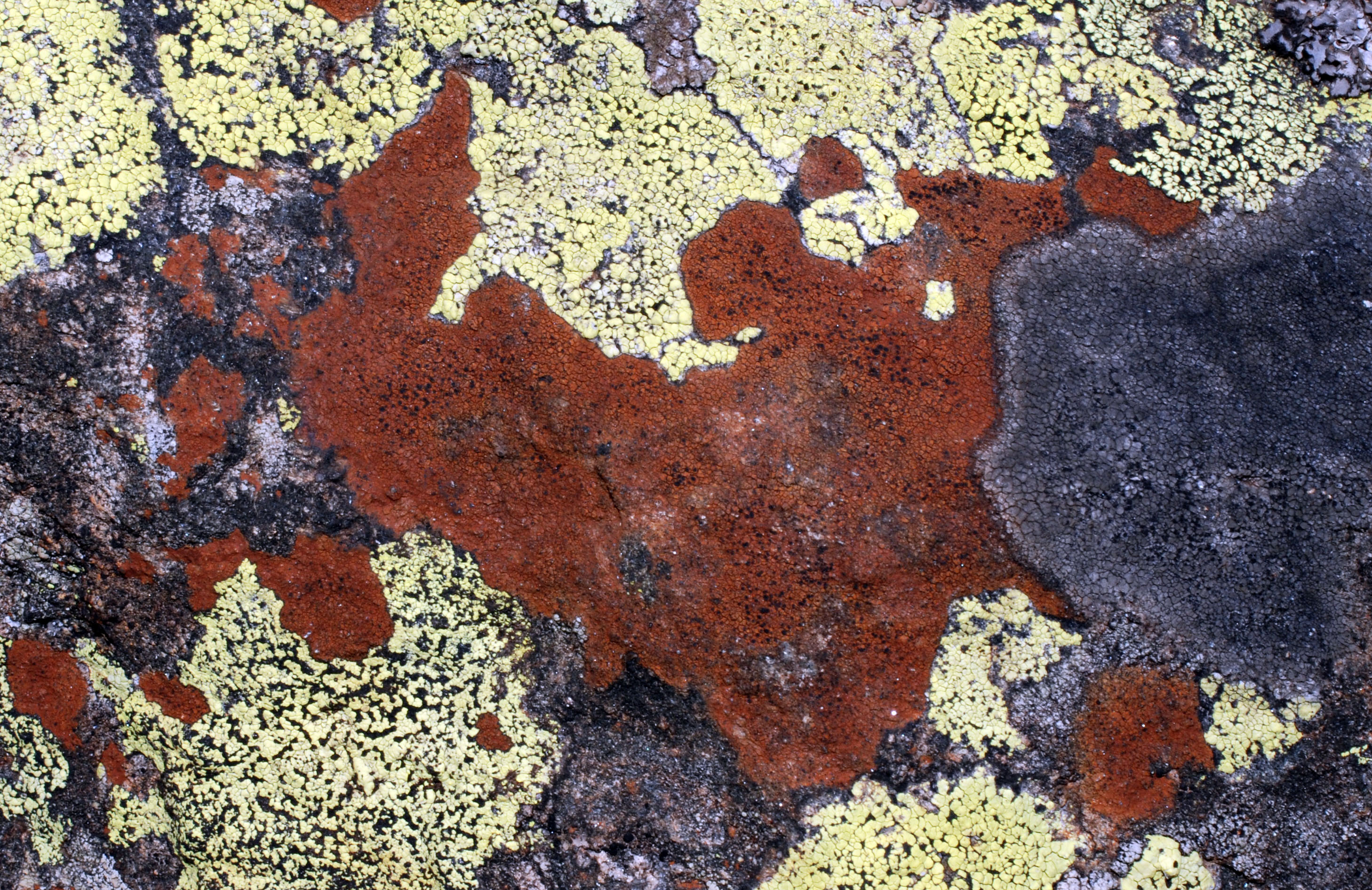
- Tremolecia atrata (brown red), Nassbodensee ~ 2000 m elevation, Austria

Scientific classification
- Kingdom: Fungi
- Division: Ascomycota
- Class: Lecanoromycetes
- Order: Baeomycetales
- Family: Hymeneliaceae
- Genus: Tremolecia; M.Choisy (1953)

Type species
- Tremolecia dicksonii (J.F.Gmel.) M.Choisy (1953)

Species
- T. atrata T. dicksonii

= Tremolecia =

Genus of lichen-forming fungi

Tremolecia is a small genus of lichen-forming fungi in the family Hymeneliaceae. Its two accepted species form thin crusts on rock and are recognised by their dark, cup-shaped fruiting bodies (apothecia). The better-known species, Tremolecia atrata, is widespread on iron-rich rocks in mountainous and arctic regions.

== Taxonomy ==
The genus was circumscribed by the French lichenologist Maurice Choisy in 1953. Choisy characterized Tremolecia by its umbonate (centrally raised) or somewhat gyrose (brain-like, with wavy folds) apothecia, rather small spores occurring eight per ascus, and very short, straight pycnoconidia (asexual spores produced in flask-shaped structures). He also compared the genus with Gyrothecium.

== Description ==
Tremolecia species are crustose lichens, appearing as a thin crust-like growth on its substrate without a protective outer layer (ecorticate). The photobiont—the photosynthetic partner in this symbiotic relationship—is a single-celled green alga with nearly spherical to completely spherical cells measuring 7–14 by 6–13 micrometres.

The reproductive structures (ascomata) are cup-shaped fruiting bodies called apothecia. These apothecia are of the lecideine type, meaning they have their own distinct margin, and can be either sunken into the lichen surface with a crater-like appearance (immersed and more or less aspicilioid) or sitting on top of the surface (sessile). The proper exciple—the tissue forming the rim of the apothecium—appears dark brown and opaque when viewed in cross-section.

Inside the reproductive structures, the paraphyses (sterile filaments) are sparsely branched and occasionally fused (anastomosed), with tips that are not swollen (not capitate). The asci—specialized cells that produce spores—are club-shaped and contain eight spores each. They belong to the Tremolecia-type, characterized by a well-developed tholus (thickened apical region) that stains very weakly with iodine (weakly amyloid), has a thin outer cap that does stain with iodine (external amyloid cap), and lacks a central chamber (ocular chamber).

The ascospores are simple (not divided by septa), clear (hyaline), ellipsoid in shape, lack a gelatinous coating (non-halonate), and have thin walls. The asexual reproductive structures (conidiomata) are flask-shaped pycnidia embedded within the lichen body. The asexual spores (conidia) are rod-shaped (bacilliform).

The genus does not produce any secondary metabolites detectable by standard lichen spot tests.

== Species ==
As of March 2025, Species Fungorum (in the Catalogue of Life), accept two species of Tremolecia:

- Tremolecia atrata (Ach.) Hertel (1977)
- Tremolecia dicksonii (J.F.Gmel.) M.Choisy (1953)

Another four species transferred into the genus by Hannes Hertel in 1977 (T. lividonigra, T. nivalis, T. similigena, and T. tuberculans) are not currently accepted by Species Fungorum.

Some species that were at one time placed in this genus have since been transferred to other genera:

- Tremolecia glauca (Taylor) Hertel & Gotth. Schneid. (1980) is now Paraporpidia glauca
- Tremolecia jurana (Schaer.) Hertel (1971) is now Farnoldia jurana
- Tremolecia transitoria (Arnold) Hertel (1977) is now Melanolecia transitoria
