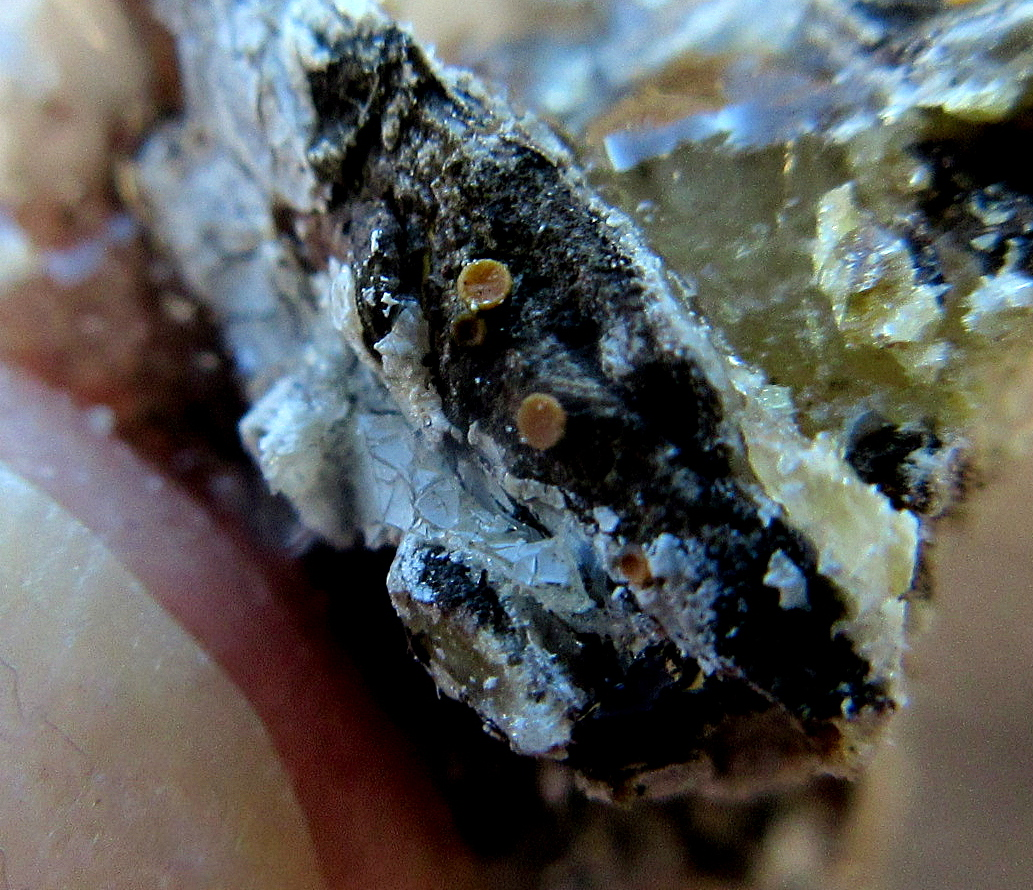
- Sarea resinae

Scientific classification
- Kingdom: Fungi
- Division: Ascomycota
- Class: Sareomycetes
- Order: Sareales
- Family: Sareaceae
- Genus: Sarea Fr. (1825)

Type species
- Sarea difformis (Fr.) Fr. (1828)

= Sarea =

Genus of fungi

Sarea is a genus of small, non-lichenized, inoperculate, discomycete fungi in the family Zythiaceae. Sarea species are found growing on the resin of conifers in the Cupressaceae and Pinaceae in the Northern Hemisphere. Two species in the genus are readily distinguishable from each other: apothecia of Sarea difformis are black, while those of Sarea resinae are orange in color.

== Species ==
- Sarea coeloplata (Norman) J.K.Mitch., Garrido-Ben. & Quijada (2021)
- Sarea difformis (Fr.) Fr. (1828)
- Sarea resinae (Fr.) Kuntze (1898)
