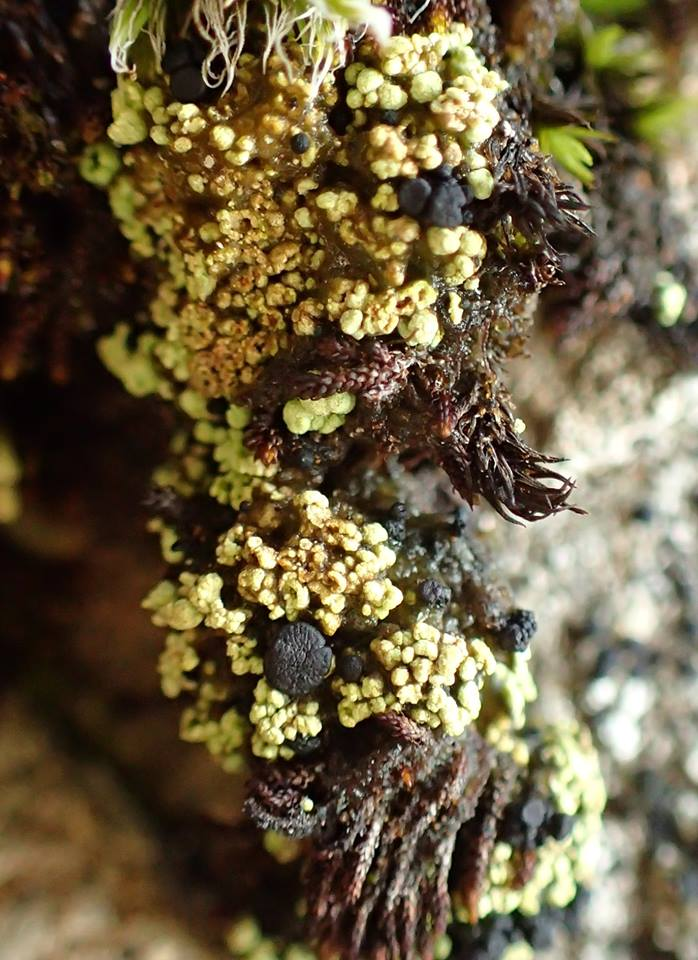
- Arthrorhaphis alpina

Scientific classification
- Kingdom: Fungi
- Division: Ascomycota
- Class: Lecanoromycetes
- Family: Arthrorhaphidaceae; Poelt & Hafellner (1976)
- Genus: Arthrorhaphis; Th.Fr. (1860)

Type species
- Arthrorhaphis flavovirescens (A.Massal.) Th.Fr. (1861)

Synonyms
- Gongylia Körb. (1855); Mycobacidia Rehm (1890); Parathalle Clem. (1909); Raphiospora A.Massal. (1853)

= Arthrorhaphis =

Genus of fungi

Arthrorhaphis is a genus of fungi in the monotypic family Arthrorhaphidaceae. It has 13 species. Species in this family have a widespread distribution in temperate and montane habitats. They grow symbiotically with green algae, or parasitically on other lichens. These fungi typically start as parasites on other lichens but can later become free-living, forming bright greenish-yellow to greyish scales on acidic soils and weathered rocks in cool upland regions.

== Taxonomy ==
The genus was circumscribed by Theodor Magnus Fries in 1860. The family was proposed by lichenologists Josef Poelt and Josef Hafellner in 1976. The family Arthrorhaphidaceae has an uncertain taxonomic placement in the class Lecanoromycetes; that is, it is incertae sedis with respect to ordinal placement.

== Description ==
Arthrorhaphis species either have no thallus of their own or form a thin crust that lacks a distinct marginal zone. When the fungus grows independently it soon breaks into tiny, strongly convex scales (squamules) that are bright greenish yellow to whitish grey; these scales have no true protective cortex, only a delicate colourless surface layer. Some taxa also produce fine, powdery soredia that serve as propagules for vegetative reproduction. The photobiont partner is a chlorococcoid green alga that forms a conspicuous, compact layer of cells.

The sexual fruiting bodies (apothecia) sit directly on the thallus or nestle between the squamules. They are black and either urn-shaped (urceolate) or disc-like, and many are packed with crumbly, brown-green granules that resemble droplets. The surrounding wall (exciple) is poorly developed, consisting of loosely woven hyphae with markedly swollen walls. Threads called paraphyses weave through the spore-bearing layer (hymenium); they are slender, freely branched and interconnected, with only slight thickening at their tips. Oil droplets are often scattered throughout the hymenium.

Each ascus contains eight ascospores and is club-shaped (clavate); the apex shows only minimal thickening and reacts negatively to iodine (K/I–) but does have a small transparent ocular chamber. The spores are long and narrow—ranging from cylindrical to nearly needle-like—and are divided by three to fifteen, occasionally up to twenty-eight, internal cross-walls (septa). Asexual reproduction occurs in conspicuous black pycnidia that produce smooth, colourless, ellipsoidal conidia. Chemically, the genus is known to contain rhizocarpic acid, epanorin and various unidentified pigments, alongside secondary metabolites derived from its host lichens.

== Ecology ==
Arthrorhaphis species favour acidic substrates and, less often, mildly calcareous ones. They usually start out parasitising crustose or fruticose lichens but may later become free-living, spreading across soil among mosses or over weather-worn rock in cool, often upland regions.

== Species ==
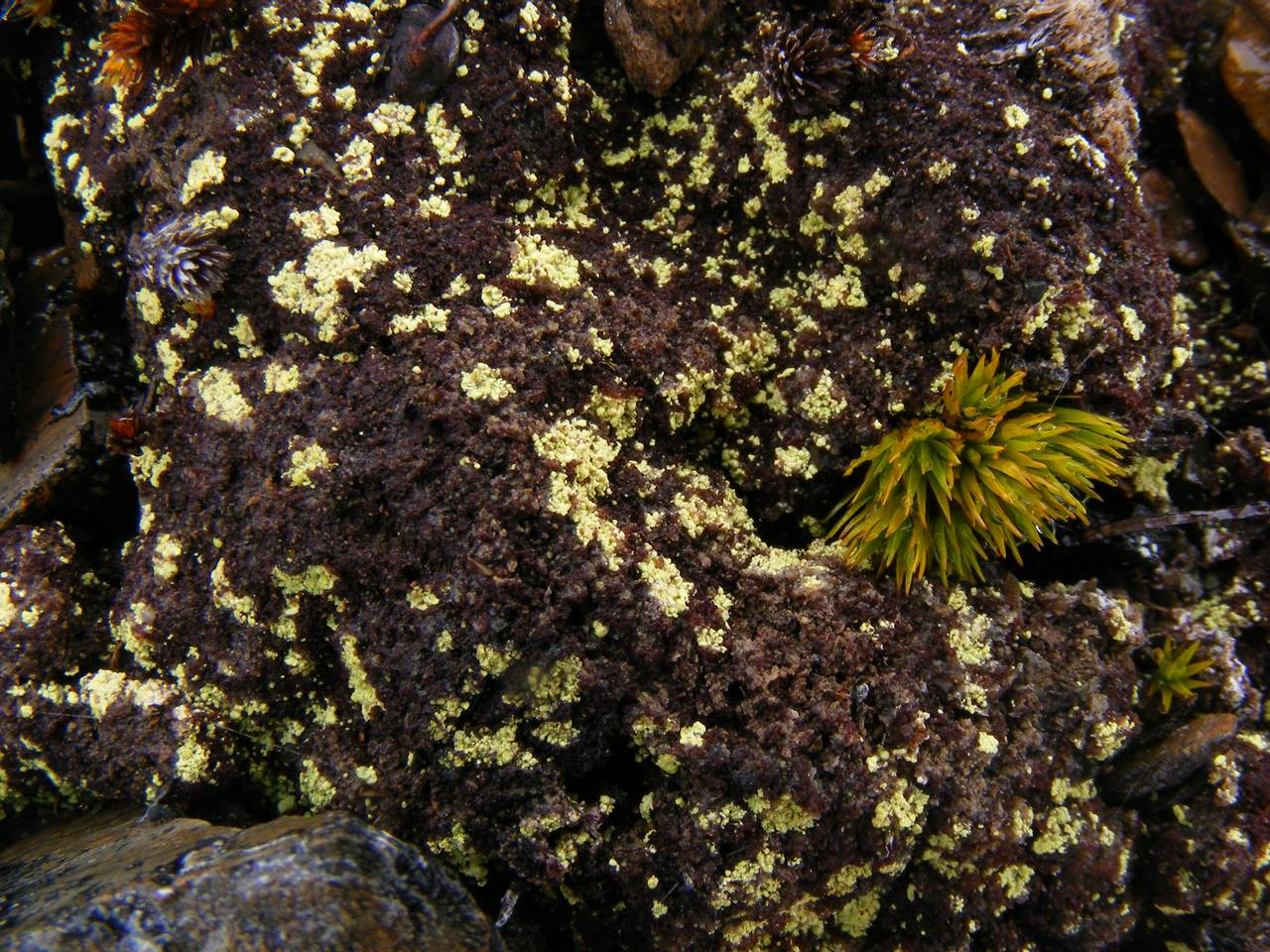
Arthrorhaphis citrinella

- Arthrorhaphis aeruginosa R.Sant. & Tønsberg (1994)
- Arthrorhaphis alpina (Schaer.) R.Sant. (1980)
- Arthrorhaphis anziana (Lynge) Poelt (1969)
- Arthrorhaphis arctoparmeliae Kocourk. & van den Boom (2005)
- Arthrorhaphis citrinella (Ach.) Poelt (1969)
- Arthrorhaphis grisea Th.Fr. (1861)
- Arthrorhaphis muddii Obermayer (1994)
- Arthrorhaphis olivaceae R.Sant. & Tønsberg (1994)
- Arthrorhaphis phyllobaeis Etayo & Palice (2017)
- Arthrorhaphis summorum B.de Lesd. (1933)
- Arthrorhaphis vacillans Th.Fr. & Almq. ex Th.Fr. (1867)
- Arthrorhaphis viridescens Rabenh. (1870)
