= List of ships named Cameronia =

Cameronia was the name of three ships built for Anchor Line:

- SS Cameronia (1911), a passenger liner built in 1911 and sunk by German U-boat U-33 in 1917
- RMS Cameronia (1919), a passenger liner completed in 1920 and scrapped in 1957
- Cameronia (1973), a bulk carrier built in 1973, later trading for a number of different owners with several changes of name until scrapped in 1999
