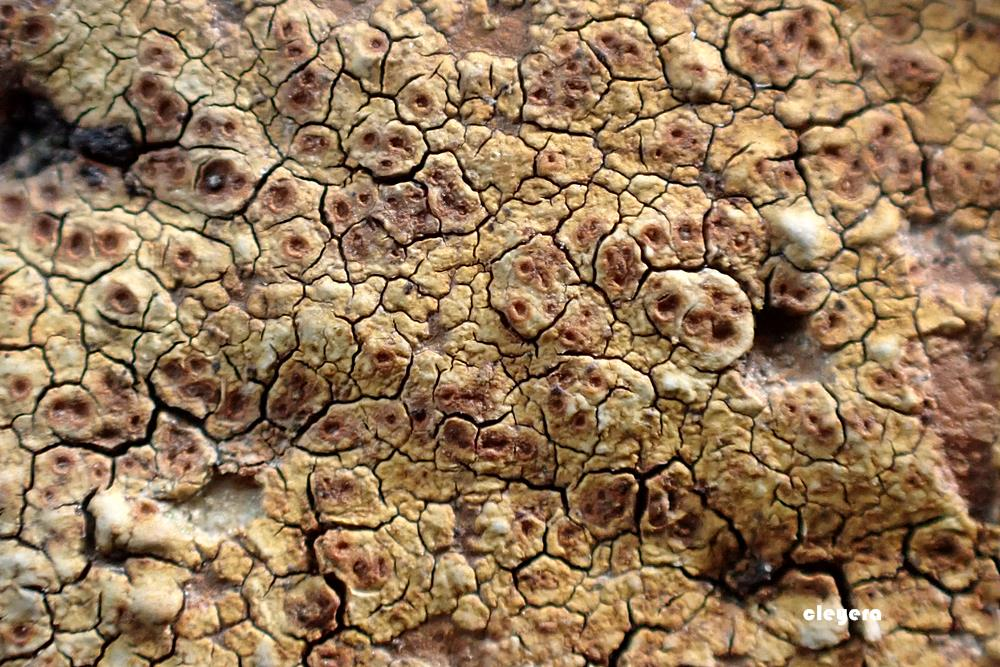
- Hymenelia ceracea, in Taiwan at 1,900 m (6,200 ft)

Scientific classification
- Domain: Eukaryota
- Kingdom: Fungi
- Division: Ascomycota
- Class: Lecanoromycetes
- Order: Baeomycetales
- Family: Hymeneliaceae
- Genus: Hymenelia; Kremp. (1852)

Type species
- Hymenelia prevostii (Duby) Kremp. (1852)

Synonyms
- Pinacisca A.Massal. (1854)

= Hymenelia =

Genus of fungi

Hymenelia is a genus of lichen-forming fungi belonging to the family Hymeneliaceae.

Collectively, the genus has a cosmopolitan distribution.

== Species ==
- Hymenelia aigneri (Zahlbr.) Hafellner & Türk (2001)
- Hymenelia ceracea (Arnold) M.Choisy (1949)
- Hymenelia cyanocarpa (Anzi) Lutzoni (1995)
- Hymenelia epulotica (Ach.) Lutzoni (1995)
- Hymenelia glacialis Øvstedal (2001)
- Hymenelia grossa Aptroot & K.H.Moon (2014)
- Hymenelia gyalectoidea Kantvilas (2014)
- Hymenelia heteromorpha (Kremp.) Lutzoni (1995)
- Hymenelia macrospora Øvstedal (2009)
- Hymenelia melanocarpa (Kremp.) Arnold (1869)
- Hymenelia microcarpa Fryday (2019) – Falkland Islands
- Hymenelia parva Fryday & J.W.McCarthy (2018)
- Hymenelia prevostii (Duby) Kremp. (1852)
- Hymenelia rhodopis (Sommerf.) Lutzoni (1995)
