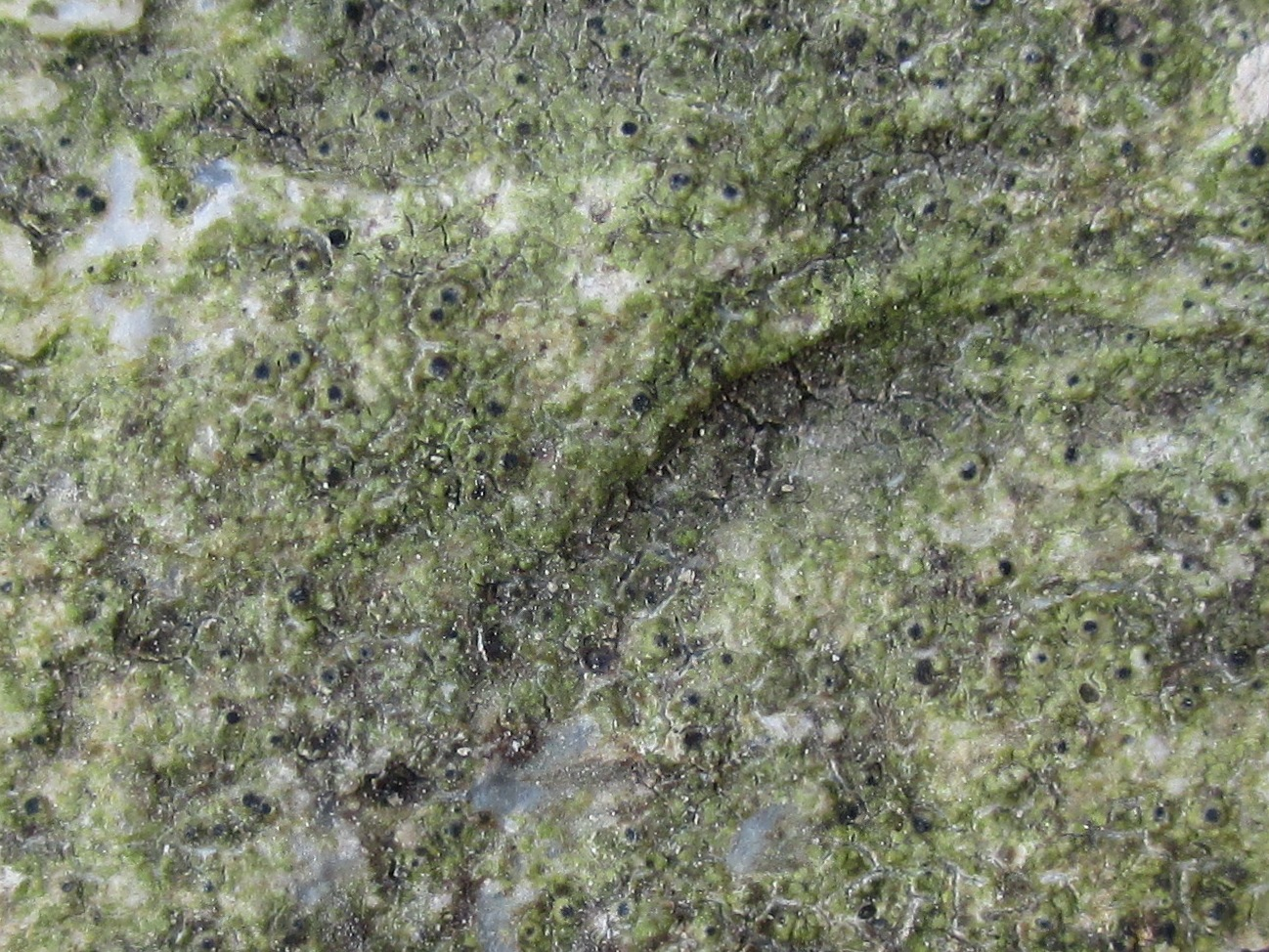
- Protothelenella corrosa

Scientific classification
- Kingdom: Fungi
- Division: Ascomycota
- Class: Lecanoromycetes
- Order: Baeomycetales
- Family: Protothelenellaceae
- Genus: Protothelenella; Räsänen (1943)

Type species
- Protothelenella reducta (Th.Fr.) Räsänen (1943)

= Protothelenella =

Genus of lichens

Protothelenella is a genus of fungi in the family Protothelenellaceae. It contains 11 species, some of which form lichens. Protothelenella species have a crustose thallus with spherical to pear-shaped, dark brown to blackish perithecia. Microscopic characteristics of the genus include bitunicate asci with an amyloid tholus, and ascospores that are colourless and contain multiple internal partitions. Some species grow on acidic substrates including rocks, soil, bryophytes, plant detritus or rotten wood. Other species are lichenicolous (lichen-dwelling), growing on species of Solorina, Peltigera, Pseudocyphellaria, or Cladonia.

== Taxonomy ==
The genus was circumscribed by Finnish lichenologist Veli Räsänen in 1943, with Protothelenella reducta assigned as the type species. The genus Thelenella is similar in some aspects, but differs in the negative iodine staining of its ascus and hymenial gel.

A molecular phylogenetics analysis of three Protothelenella species suggested that the genus is monophyletic, and closely related to the species Anzina carneonivea.

== Description ==
Protothelenella either lacks a lichenized thallus or possesses a distinctly lichenized, crustose thallus. The thallus typically appears granular to cracked-areolate in texture, with a diffuse margin. When fresh, it usually has a bright green colour, but upon drying, the colour changes to whitish or grey-brown. The thallus becomes more or less gelatinous when wet, and it is hardly anatomically differentiated.

The photobiont (photosynthetic partner) in Protothelenella is the green algal genus Elliptochloris, or it may be absent altogether. Its ascomata, the structures that produce asci (spore-bearing cells), are perithecia, which are generally single, scattered, and immersed within the thallus. These perithecia range from spherical to pear-shaped, with colours varying from dark brown to blackish.

The genus does not possess an involucrellum (an additional protective layer around the perithecium), and its true exciple (the outer protective layer of the perithecium) is brown to greenish-blue in the upper part and mostly colourless towards the base. It consists of strongly anastomosing conglutinate hyphae, measuring up to 1 μm in diameter, with narrow lumina.

Protothelenella features a hamathecium (a network of sterile hyphae among the asci) made up of paraphysoids, which are persistent, strongly branched and anastomosed. Periphysoids are absent in this genus. Its hymenial gel, a gelatinous layer above the ascus layer, reacts to iodine, showing a dull red colour with iodine (I+) and a blue colour when potassium iodide (K/I+) is present. The asci are more or less cylindrical, bearing 6 to 8 spores, and have thick walls (2–5 μm) with two functional layers. The outer wall layer reacts with iodine, turning a dull reddish color (I+) and blue with potassium iodide (K/I+). The ascus apex has an iodine-blue (I+ blue), more or less layered, Xylaria-like ring.

The ascospores of Protothelenella are colourless, contain multiple cross partitions (septa), and range from somewhat muriform (slightly segmented) to strongly muriform (highly segmented). The outer wall of the spores is distinctly thicker than the septa. The conidiomata, structures that bear asexual spores or conidia, are not known to occur in this genus.

Chemically, Protothelenella species may contain an unidentified substance that turns red with the application of bleach (C+ red), or they may not contain any specific lichen substances at all.

== Habitat and distribution ==
Members of Protothelenella, including lichenized species, primarily inhabit acidic substrates such as rocks, soil, mosses, plant detritus, and wood, typically in moist environments. In contrast, non-lichenized Protothelenella species are either lichenicolous (growing on lichens) or found on living mosses.

The genus Protothelenella is widely distributed, with 11 species found across the Northern Hemisphere and in the austral regions.

== Species ==
The known hosts of the lichenicolous members of Protothelenella are given, sourced to Diederich and colleagues' 2018 review of lichenicolous fungi. Facultatively lichenicolous fungi typically live independently, but can also live as a lichenicolous species when the conditions are favourable.

- Protothelenella corrosa (Körb.) H.Mayrhofer & Poelt (1985)
- Protothelenella croceae (Bagl. & Carestia) Hafellner & H.Mayrhofer (1987) – host: Solorina crocea, more rarely Peltigera
- Protothelenella leucothelia (Nyl.) H.Mayrhofer & Poelt (1985) – facultatively lichenicolous on dead or dying lichens, particularly Cladonia
- Protothelenella petri H.Mayrhofer & Poelt (1987)
- Protothelenella pluriseptata Fryday (2004)
- Protothelenella polytrichi Döbbeler & H.Mayrhofer (1987)
- Protothelenella pseudocyphellariae Etayo (2008) – host: Pseudocyphellaria
- Protothelenella santessonii H.Mayrhofer (1987)
- Protothelenella sphinctrinoidella (Nyl.) H.Mayrhofer & Poelt (1985) – facultatively lichenicolous on Cladonia, Peltigera, and Stereocaulon
- Protothelenella sphinctrinoides (Nyl.) H.Mayrhofer & Poelt (1985) – facultatively lichenicolous on Peltigera and Solorina
- Protothelenella xylina H.Mayrhofer & Poelt (1985)
