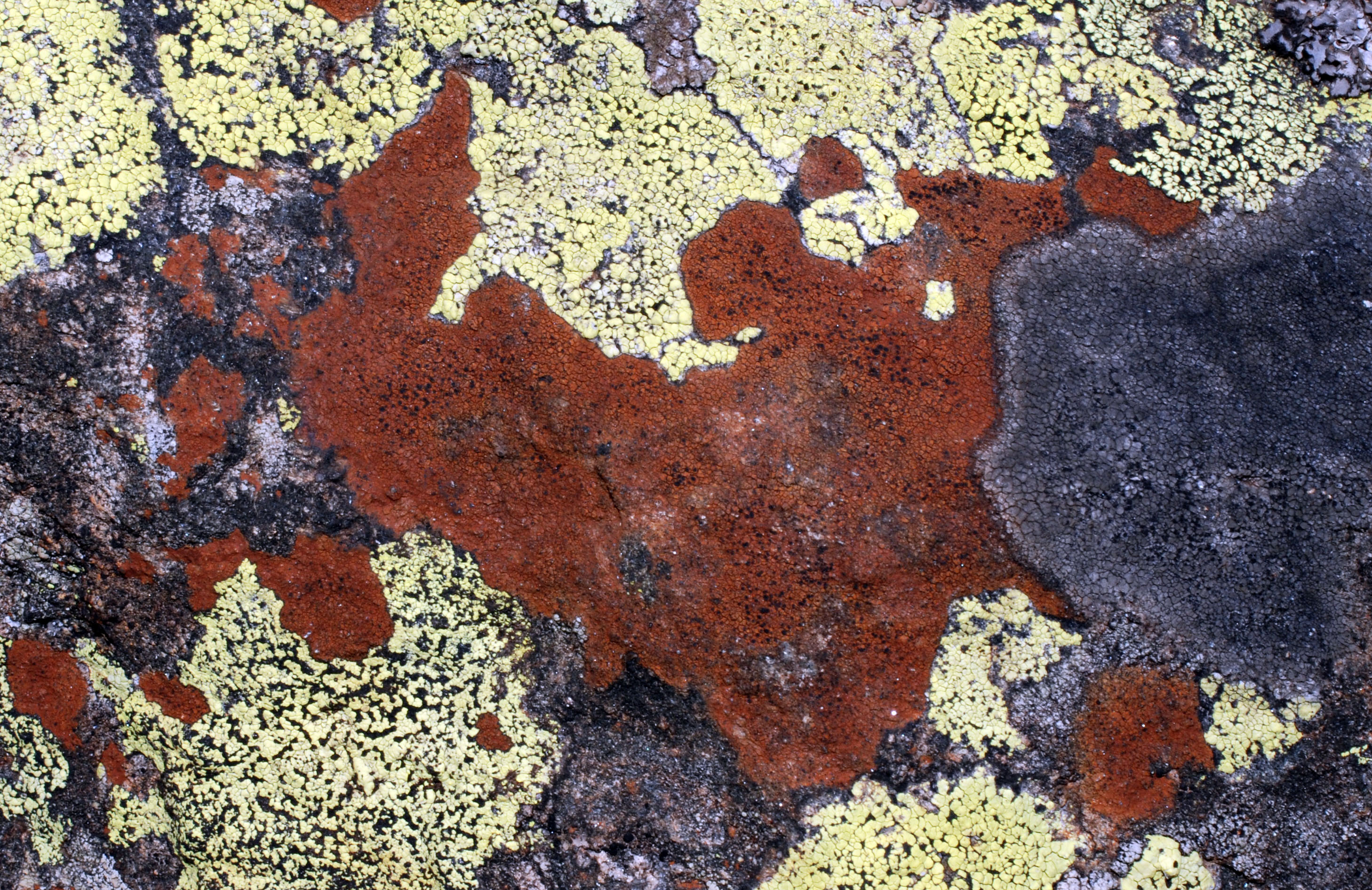
- Tremolecia atrata is the brownish-red crustose lichen; photographed at an altitude of 2,000 m (6,600 ft) in Carinthia, Austria

Scientific classification
- Kingdom: Fungi
- Division: Ascomycota
- Class: Lecanoromycetes
- Order: Baeomycetales
- Family: Hymeneliaceae; Körb. (1855)

Type genus
- Hymenelia Kremp. (1852)

Genera
- Hymenelia; Ionaspis; Tremolecia

= Hymeneliaceae =

Family of lichen

Hymeneliaceae is a family of lichen-forming fungi in the order Baeomycetales. It contains three genera and about 40 species. The family was circumscribed by German lichenologist Gustav Wilhelm Körber in 1855.

Lichens in the Hymeneliaceae are saxicolous (rock-dwelling) and crustose, occurring predominantly in the cool-temperate climates to subarctic climates of both the Northern and Southern hemispheres.

== Genera ==
- Hymenelia Kremp. (1852) – 26 spp.
- Ionaspis Th.Fr. (1871) – 7 spp.
- Tremolecia M.Choisy (1953) – 6 spp.
