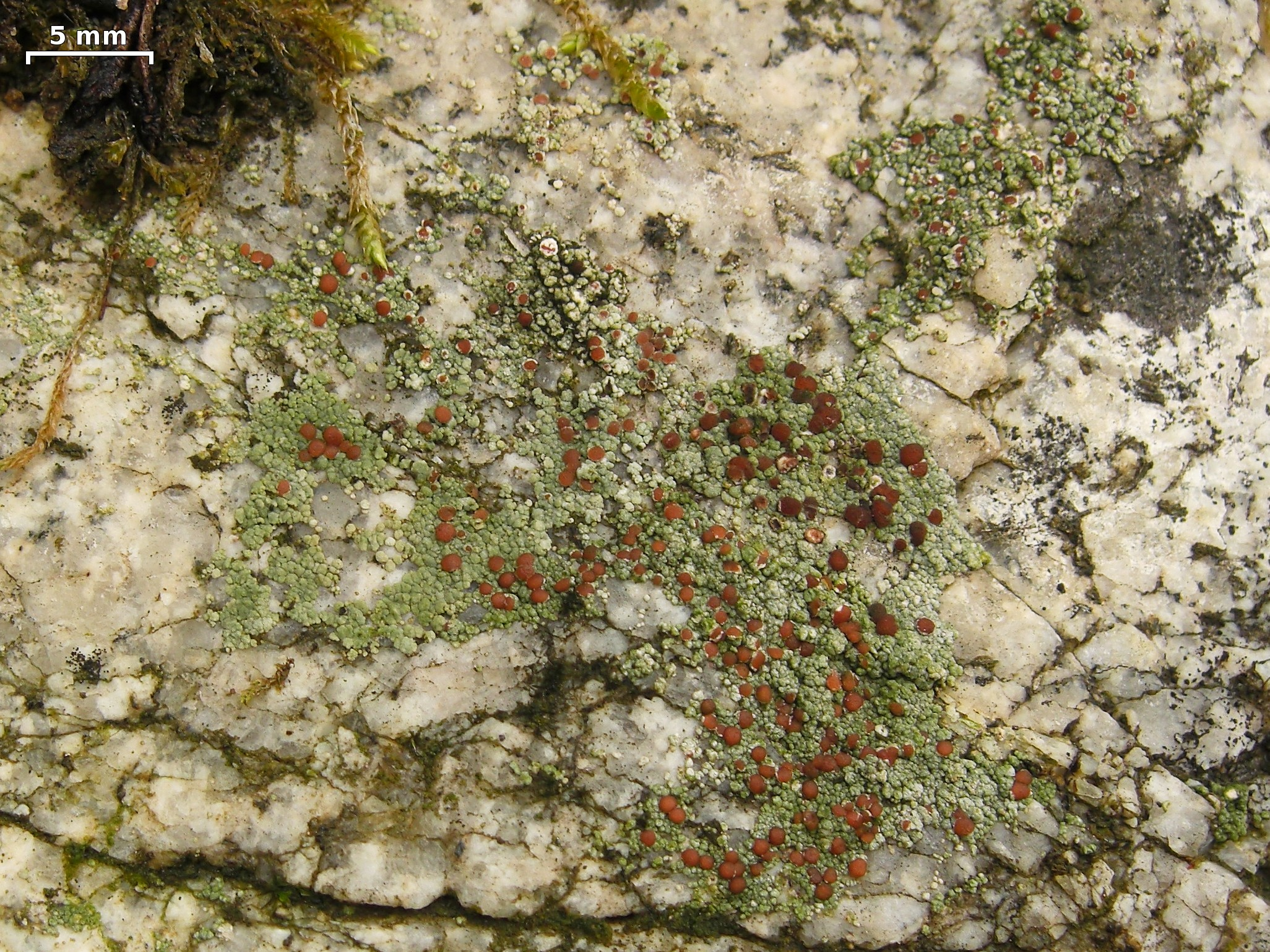
- Trapelia coarctata

Scientific classification
- Kingdom: Fungi
- Division: Ascomycota
- Class: Lecanoromycetes
- Order: Baeomycetales
- Family: Trapeliaceae
- Genus: Trapelia; M.Choisy (1929)

Type species
- Trapelia coarctata (Turner) M.Choisy (1932)

Synonyms
- Discocera A.L.Sm. & Ramsb. (1918); Trapelina Motyka (1996)

= Trapelia =

Genus of lichen

Trapelia is a genus of lichen-forming fungi in the family Trapeliaceae. These lichens form tight, crusty patches on rocks and bark that may appear smooth at first but often crack into small plates over time. The genus was established by the French lichenologist Maurice Choisy in 1929 and contains more than 20 species found worldwide. Most species reproduce through small, disc-shaped fruiting bodies that range from pale pink-brown to nearly black, and many can be identified by specific chemical compounds they produce.

== Taxonomy ==
Trapelia was circumscribed by the French lichenologist Maurice Choisy in 1929. He assigned Trapelia coarctata as the type species.

== Description ==
Trapelia forms a low-profile crust that adheres tightly to its substrate. Colonies may begin as a thin, continuous film with a smooth outer edge; over time this film either cracks into a mosaic of tiny plates (areoles) or arises directly as discrete areoles that later press together to form an almost seamless crust. The uppermost layer of fungal tissue (cortex) is only weakly differentiated and comprises rounded cells, while a delicate epinecral film of dead cell remnants often leaves a fine frost-like sheen (pruina). A narrow, sometimes inconspicuous prothallus—an initial growth of colourless hyphae—may fringe the colony. The internal algal partner is a minute, spherical green alga (chlorococcoid photobiont).

Reproductive structures appear as rounded apothecia that sit flush with, or slightly raised above, the thallus surface. When young they are partly embedded; mature apothecia may display a thin, brown, often ragged margin formed from disrupted thallus tissue, giving the impression of a "pseudothalline" rim. The disc ranges from pale pink-brown to almost black and is frequently uneven or roughened. Internally, the epithecium is brown and may dissolve to an orange-brown solution in potassium hydroxide solution (a common diagnostic test), whereas the underlying hypothecium is pale to light brown. Slender paraphyses thread the hymenium; these filaments branch and fuse profusely near their tips, but their ends remain narrow rather than swollen.

Each ascus is slightly club-shaped, stains weakly blue in iodine and carries eight single-celled, colourless ascospores that are ellipsoidal and 9–25 micrometres (μm) long. In many species tiny, immersed pycnidia generate asexual conidia—straight or slightly curved rods—that help the lichen spread. Chemical analyses detect one or more of three common secondary metabolites—gyrophoric acid, lecanoric acid and 5-O-methylhiascic acid—which can assist with species-level identification.

== Species ==
As of June 2025 Species Fungorum (in the Catalogue of Life) accept 18 species of Trapeila.

- Trapelia antarctica Ertz, Aptroot, G.Thor & Øvstedal (2014)
- Trapelia atrocarpa Elix & P.M.McCarthy (2020)
- Trapelia calvariana Kantvilas & Lumbsch (2014)
- Trapelia coarctata (Turner) M.Choisy (1932)
- Trapelia collaris Orange (2018)
- Trapelia concentrica Elix & P.M.McCarthy (2019)
- Trapelia coreana S.Y.Kondr., Lőkös & Hur (2016)
- Trapelia corticola Coppins & P.James (1984)
- Trapelia crystallifera Kantvilas & Elix (2007)
- Trapelia elacista (Ach.) Orange (2018)
- Trapelia glebulosa (Sm.) J.R.Laundon (2005)
- Trapelia herteliana Fryday (2004)
- Trapelia involuta (Taylor) Hertel (1973)
- Trapelia lilacea Kantvilas & Elix (2007)
- Trapelia macrospora Fryday (2004)
- Trapelia obtegens (Th.Fr.) Hertel (1970)
- Trapelia placodioides Coppins & P.James (1984)
- Trapelia rubra Aptroot & Schumm (2012)
- Trapelia sitiens Orange (2018)
- Trapelia stipitata Brodo & Lendemer (2015)
- Trapelia thieleana Kantvilas, Lumbsch & Elix (2014)
- Trapelia tristis Orange (2018)
