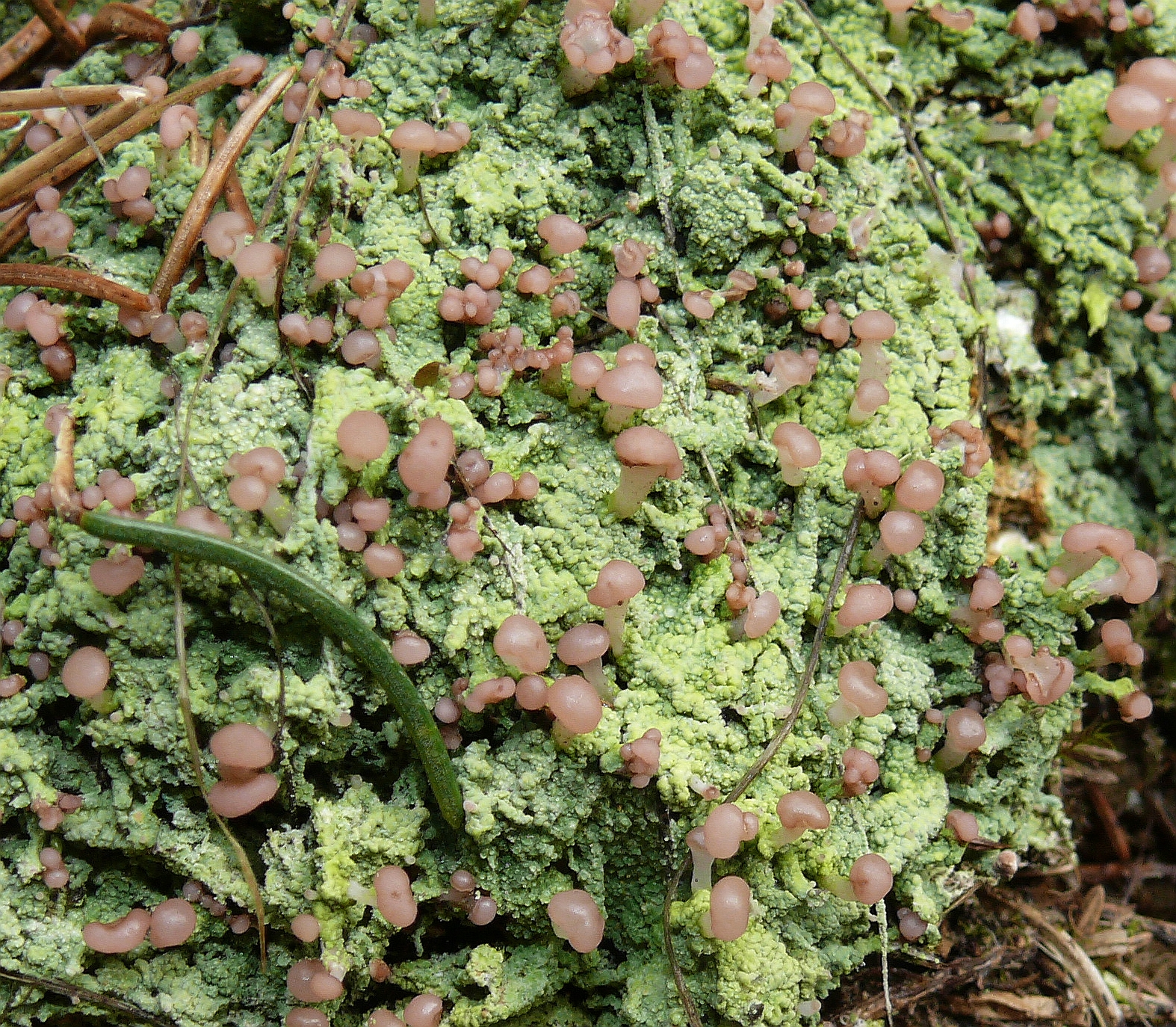
- Baeomyces rufus

Scientific classification
- Kingdom: Fungi
- Division: Ascomycota
- Class: Lecanoromycetes
- Subclass: Ostropomycetidae
- Order: Baeomycetales; Lumbsch, Huhndorf & Lutzoni (2007)

Type genus
- Baeomyces Pers. (1794)

Families
- Arctomiaceae; Arthrorhaphidaceae; Baeomycetaceae; Cameroniaceae; Hymeneliaceae; Protothelenellaceae; Trapeliaceae; Xylographaceae

Synonyms
- Arctomiales S.Stenroos, Miądl. & Lutzoni (2014); Hymeneliales S.Stenroos, Miądl. & Lutzoni (2014); Trapeliales B.P.Hodk. & Lendemer (2011)

= Baeomycetales =

Order of fungi

The Baeomycetales are an order of mostly lichen-forming fungi in the subclass Ostropomycetidae, in the class Lecanoromycetes. It contains 8 families, 33 genera and about 170 species. As a result of molecular phylogenetics research published in the late 2010s, several orders were folded into the Baeomycetales, resulting in a substantial increase in the number of taxa.

== Taxonomy ==
The family Baeomycetaceae was originally proposed by Barthélemy Charles Joseph Dumortier in 1829 (under the spelling Baeomyceae); he included two genera, Baeomyces and Calicium. Baeomycetaceae was initially classified in the Lecanorales, and Baeomycetaceae and Cladoniaceae were thought to be closely related, sharing a phylogenetic origin in Lecideaceae. It was transferred to the order Helotiales based on the structure of its ascus, which is similar to those in genus Leotia. However, the Helotiales consists of mostly non-lichenised fungi. The first DNA studies conducted with Baeomyces species did not suggest any phylogenetic relatedness with Leotia. Later studies demonstrated a sister group relationship between Baeomyces and the order Ostropales, and Baeomycetales was informally suggested as a suitable name for this lineage.

After additional molecular studies confirmed the placement of the Baeomycetaceae in the subclass Ostropomycetidae, the order Baeomycetales was formally circumscribed in 2007 by H. Thorsten Lumbsch, Sabine Huhndorf, and Francois Lutzoni. They suggested that Ainoa, Baeomyces, and Phyllobaeis were exemplar genera in the order. The composition of the Baeomycetales has been amended several times since its original circumscription, as molecular phylogenetic analyses have helped to resolve the phylogenetic relationships amongst its members. In 2011, the order was considered to contain two families, Baeomycetaceae and Anamylopsoraceae. The latter family, proposed by Lumbsch and Thomas Lunke in 1995, was later shown with molecular phylogenetics to nest within the Baeomycetaceae, and is now placed in synonymy with that family.

In 2018, the class Lecanoromycetes was revised using a temporal approach that uses time-calibrated chronograms to define temporal bands for comparable ranks for orders and families. In this work, the orders Arctomiales, Hymeneliales, and Trapeliales were synonymized with Baeomycetales. In a later review of the use of this method for biological classification of lichens, Robert Lücking considered this merge justified. This synonymy was also accepted in a 2020 review of fungal classification.

== Classification ==
According to a 2020 review on fungal classification, the Baeomycetales contain 8 families and 33 genera. The following list give the families, their taxon authority and year of publication, a brief synopsis of some major characteristics of the family, the genera in each family, and estimated number of species in each genus.

Arctomiaceae Th.Fr. (1861)
Thallus crustose or fruticose, gelatinized, and with rhizoids. Arctic and subarctic distribution, usually associated with bryophytes. Photobiont partner is cyanobacterial, from genus Nostoc. No secondary chemicals produced.

- Arctomia – 14 spp.
- Gregorella – 1 sp.
- Steinera – 14 spp. (Note: Steinera was previously classified in family Koerberiaceae but the genus and many of its species were transferred to the Arctomiaceae in 2017, and a new genus Henssenia was proposed to contain the remaining species.)
- Wawea – 1 sp.

Arthrorhaphidaceae Poelt & Hafellner (1976)
Thallus either crustose, or immersed within the host. Widespread in temperate and montane regions, growth on soil, with green algal photobiont partner; some species are lichenicolous. Secondary chemicals are depsides and pulvinic acid derivatives.

- Arthrorhaphis – 13 spp.

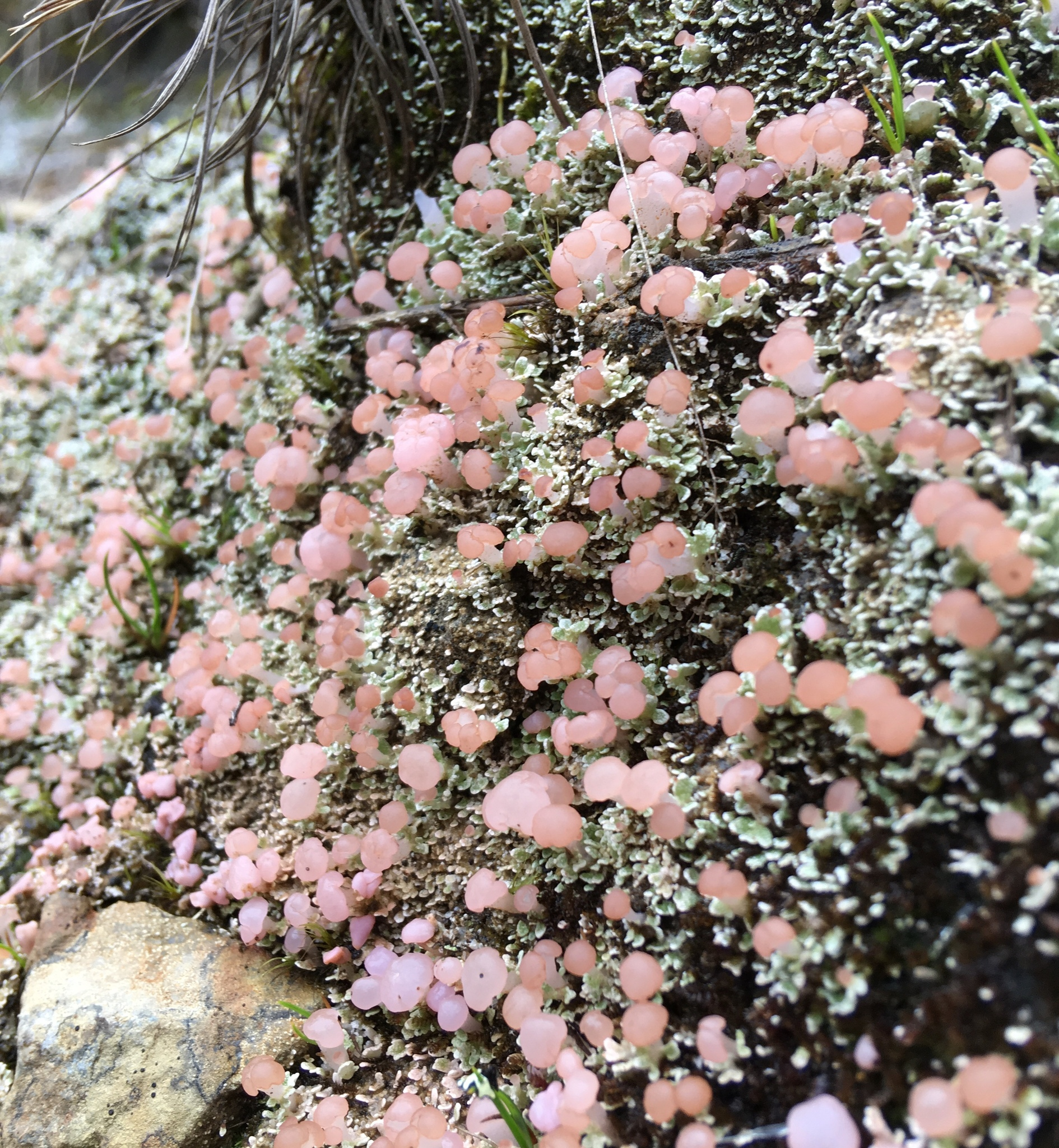
Phyllobaeis imbricata (Baeomycetaceae)

Baeomycetaceae Dumort. (1829)
Thallus crustose or squamulose, apothecia either sessile or sometimes on pink or brown stipes that are special extensions of the thallus that are not lichenized. Widespread distribution with growth typically on rock or soil.

- Ainoa – 2 spp.
- Anamylopsora – 3 spp.
- Baeomyces – 10 spp.
- Parainoa – 1 sp.
- Phyllobaeis – 6 spp.

Cameroniaceae Kantvilas & Lumbsch (2012)
Thallus crustose with chlorococcoid photobiont and perithecioid, immersed ascomata. Four spores per ascus. Secondary chemicals are dibenzofurans and triphenyls. Found in temperate Tasmania, growth on rocks.

- Cameronia – 2 spp.

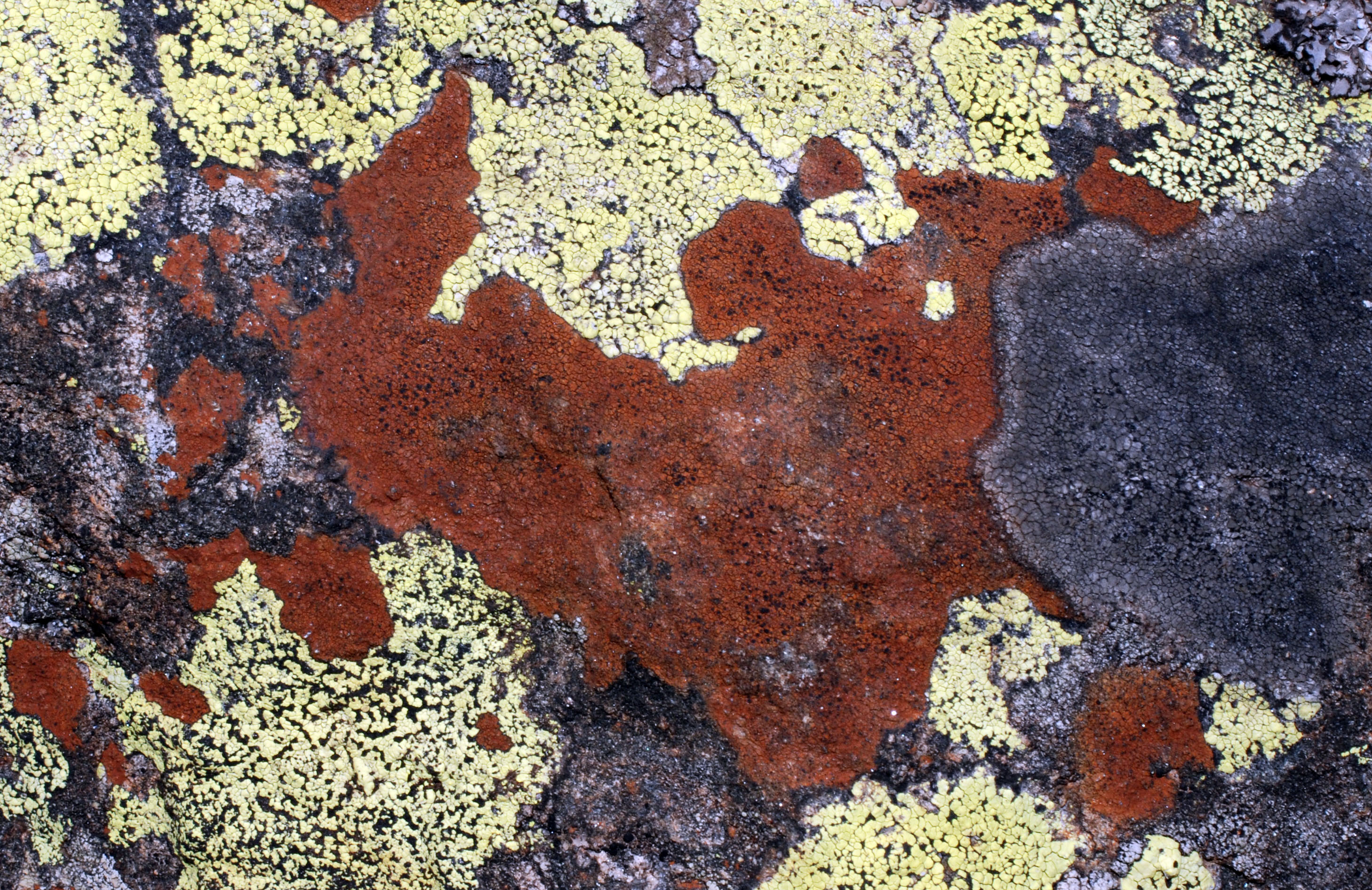
Tremolecia atrata (Hymeneliaceae)

Hymeneliaceae Körb. (1855)
Thallus usually crustose, lacking rhizoids, sometimes evanescent. Widespread distribution with growth usually on rocks and green algal photobiont. No secondary chemicals produced.

- Hymenelia – 26 spp.
- Ionaspis – 7 spp.
- Tremolecia – 6 spp.

Protothelenellaceae Vězda, H.Mayrhofer & Poelt (1985) (Note: The name Thrombiaceae Poelt & Vězda ex J.C.David & D.Hawksw. has been placed in synonymy with Protothelenellaceae.)

Thallus crustose, but sometimes poorly developed, or even absent. Ascomata intermediate in form between apothecial and perithecial, immersed, sometimes becoming erumpent, dark green to black, and opened by a broad pore. Widely distributed in northern temperate regions. Some species grow as saprobes on bark, while others are lichenised with green algae, rarely lichenicolous. Subcosmopolitan distribution; habitats include acidic rocks and soil, bryophytes and detritus, wood, or other lichens. No secondary chemicals are produced.

- Mycowinteria – 3 spp.
- Protothelenella – 11 spp.
- Thrombium – 5 spp.

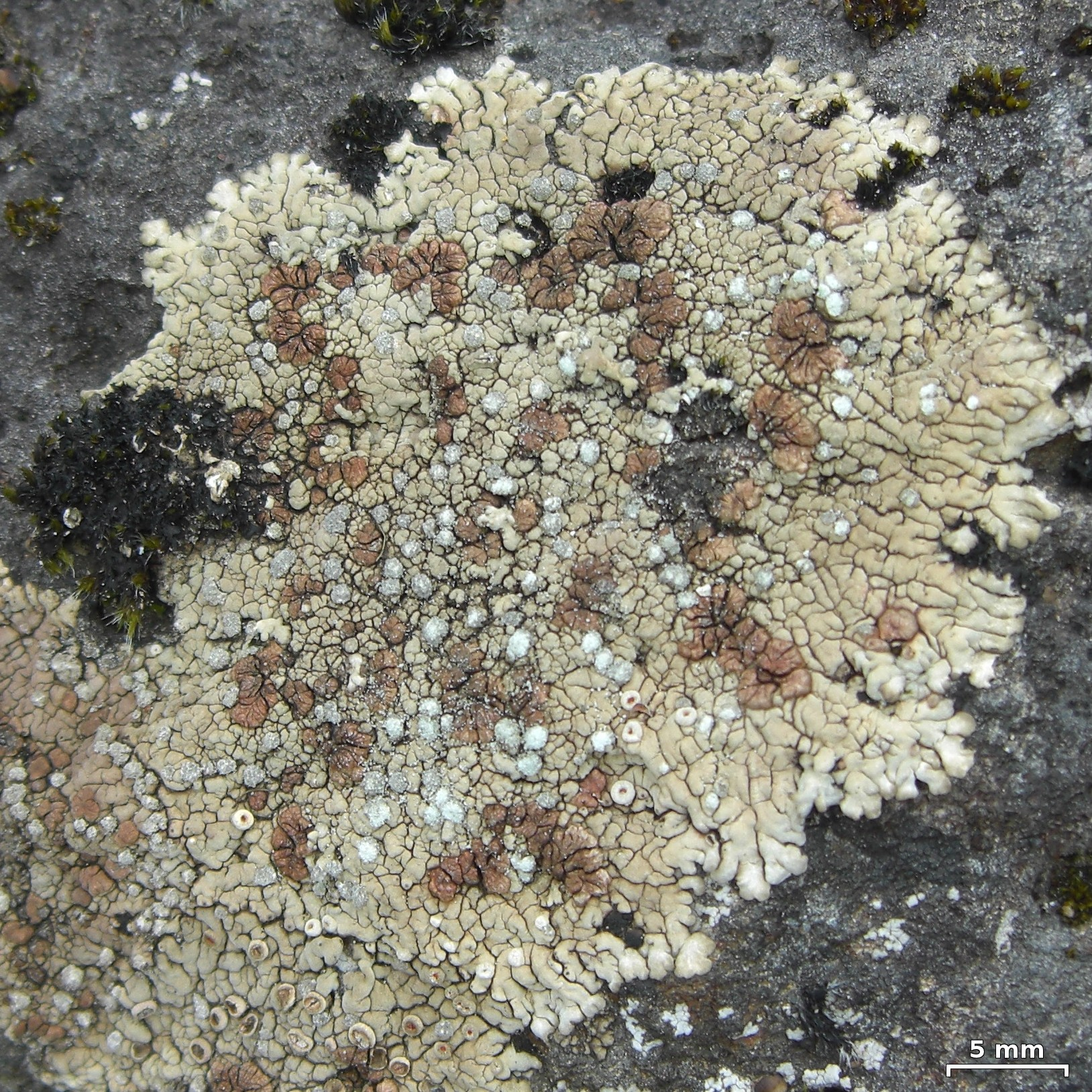
Placopsis lambii (Trapeliaceae)

Trapeliaceae M.Choisy ex Hertel (1970)
Thallus crustose to squamulose in form. Collectively, a cosmopolitan distribution, but mostly concentrated in temperate regions. Depsides, depsidones, and anthraquinones produced as secondary chemicals.

- Amylora – 1 sp.
- Aspiciliopsis – 1 sp.
- Coppinsia – 1 sp.
- Ducatina – 1 sp.
- Lignoscripta – 1 sp.
- Orceolina – 2 spp.
- Placopsis – ca. 60 spp.
- Placynthiella – 7 spp.
- Rimularia – 4 spp.
- Sarea – 2 spp.
- Trapelia – 24 spp.
- Trapeliopsis 20 spp.

Xylographaceae Tuck. (1888)
Thallus immersed in the wood substrate with rounded to lirellate fruiting bodies that are pale to blackening. Family resurrected for use following molecular analysis published in 2015.

- Lambiella – 12 spp.
- Lithographa – 10 spp.
- Ptychographa – 1 sp.
- Xylographa – 2 spp.
