= Podostictina =

Scientific classification
- Kingdom: Fungi
- Division: Ascomycota
- Class: Lecanoromycetes
- Order: Peltigerales
- Family: Peltigeraceae
- Genus: Podostictina; Clem. (1909)

Type species
- Podostictina endochrysoides (Müll.Arg.) Clem. (1909)

Species
- see text

Genus of lichens

Podostictina is a genus of lichen-forming fungi in the family Peltigeraceae, (subfamily Lobarioideae). It comprises 13 species. These are medium to large-sized lichens that typically grow on tree bark and have a distinctive yellow interior when viewed in cross-section. The genus was separated from the broader Pseudocyphellaria group in 2013 when DNA studies revealed that what was once considered a single genus actually comprised four distinct evolutionary lineages.

== Taxonomy ==
A multilocus (three-gene) phylogeny of the Lobariaceae (then treated as a family; now the subfamily Lobarioideae within Peltigeraceae) that was published in 2013 resolved Pseudocyphellaria in the loose sense into four well-supported lineages that the authors consider better treated as separate, morphochemically coherent genera. Within that framework, the clade centred on Pseudocyphellaria endochrysa corresponds to the genus Podostictina, which was originally defined by Frederic Edward Clements in 1909. The paper explicitly lists Podostictina as the available genus-level name for this group, with the type Podostictina endochrysoides (Müll.Arg.) Clem., which the authors equate to Pseudocyphellaria compar (Nyl.) H.Magn.

The study further noted that recognising these segregate genera is consistent with the distribution of key characters across the tree; in particular, the traditional concept of Pseudocyphellaria in the loose sense is not supported as a single clade. As framed in this paper, Podostictina represents the endochrysa lineage within the Pseudocyphellaria complex, whereas the other three lineages correspond to Crocodia (the aurata group), Parmostictina (the hirsuta group) and Pseudocyphellaria in the strict sense (the crocata group).

More recent phylogenomics using targeted capture of about 400 nuclear genes recovered Podostictina as a distinct lineage within the Lobariaceae (now Lobarioideae in Peltigeraceae), but its exact position on the family backbone varied with data type and method. Concatenated nucleotide analyses placed it sister to the remaining Lobariaceae, whereas species tree and amino acid analyses produced conflicting or weakly supported alternatives; the authors attribute this to extremely short internal branches and extensive gene tree discordance. Network analyses fitted the data better than strictly bifurcating trees and inferred reticulation among the pored-cortex genera, repeatedly implicating Podostictina, Sticta and Yarrumia. A fossil-calibrated relaxed clock dated the crown group of Podostictina to about 29.5 million years ago (mya), with the family stem near 64 Mya.

== Description ==
In Podostictina, the lower surface bears pseudocyphellae and a dark, uniform tomentum; the upper surface is plane (not scrobiculate or faveolate), and the medulla is yellow. The group is characterised chemically by stictane triterpenoids, which distinguishes it from the aurata (Crocodia; fernene triterpenoids) and crocata groups (Pseudocyphellaria s.str.; hopane triterpenoids), and from the hirsuta group (Parmostictina; typically lacking medullary substances).

The endochrysa and crocata groups share sessile apothecia with a proper exciple that lacks photobiont cells. The endochrysa (Podostictina) clade appears to include very few species as presently understood.

== Species ==
As of September 2025, Species Fungorum (in the Catalogue of Life) accepts 13 species of Podostictina:

- Podostictina ardesiaca (D.J.Galloway) B.Moncada & Lücking (2015)
- Podostictina berberina (G.Forst.) B.Moncada & Lücking (2015)
- Podostictina cliffordiana B.Moncada, Reidy & Lücking (2014)
- Podostictina compar (Nyl.) B.Moncada & Lücking (2015)
- Podostictina degelii (D.J.Galloway & P.James) B.Moncada & Lücking (2015)
- Podostictina encoensis (R.Sant.) D.J.Galloway & de Lange (2017)
- Podostictina endochrysa (Delise) D.J.Galloway & de Lange (2017)
- Podostictina flavicans (Hook.f. & Taylor) B.Moncada & Lücking (2015)
- Podostictina jamesii (D.J.Galloway) de Lange & D.J.Galloway (2017)
- Podostictina nermula (D.J.Galloway) de Lange & D.J.Galloway (2017)
- Podostictina pickeringii (Tuck.) B.Moncada & Lücking (2015)
- Podostictina scabrosa (R.Sant.) D.J.Galloway & de Lange (2017)
- Podostictina vaccina (Mont.) D.J.Galloway & de Lange (2017)
