= Subhysteropycnis =

Scientific classification
- Kingdom: Fungi
- Division: Ascomycota
- Class: Arthoniomycetes
- Order: Arthoniales
- Family: Arthoniaceae
- Genus: Subhysteropycnis; Wedin & Hafellner (1998)
- Species: S. maculiformans

Binomial name
- Subhysteropycnis maculiformans Wedin & Hafellner (1998)

Single-species fungal genus

Subhysteropycnis is a fungal genus in the family Arthoniaceae. This is a monotypic genus, containing the lichenicolous fungus species Subhysteropycnis maculiformans, which is parasitic on Pseudocyphellaria glabra and Pseudocyphellaria homoeophylla. The fungus creates distinctive brownish spots on its host lichens and produces ascospores within tiny flask-shaped chambers embedded in the infected tissue. It represents an early developmental stage that may eventually develop into the more complex reproductive structures of certain Arthonia species.

== Taxonomy ==
The genus Subhysteropycnis was circumscribed by Mats Wedin and Josef Hafellner in 1998 to accommodate a distinctive group of lichenicolous fungi—that is, fungi that live on or parasitise lichens—that had previously been difficult to classify within existing taxonomic frameworks. The genus name itself provides clues to its characteristics: "sub" meaning somewhat or almost, "hystero" referring to a particular type of fungal fruiting body, and "pycnis" relating to the pycnidia (spore-containing chambers) that define this group. The single species Subhysteropycnis maculiformans was simultaneously described from the same publication, with the species epithet maculiformans meaning "spot-forming", a direct reference to the characteristic brownish spots ("maculae") this fungus creates on its lichen hosts.

Subhysteropycnis appears to represent the asexual reproductive stage (anamorph) of certain Arthonia species, specifically A. badia, revealing the complex relationship between different morphological forms within a single fungal life cycle. This genus exemplifies how modern mycological taxonomy must account for fungi that can exist in multiple forms throughout their development, with Subhysteropycnis representing the early pycnidial stage that may eventually give rise to the more familiar Arthonia sexual reproductive structures. The type specimen of S. maculiformans was collected from Isla Navarino in Chile.

== Description ==
Subhysteropycnis is a specialised genus of microscopic fungi that represents what mycologists call a "coelomycete"—a type of fungus that produces its spores within flask-shaped cavities rather than on exposed surfaces. Subhysteropycnis maculiformans produces distinctive reproductive structures called pycnidia, which are small, rounded to somewhat elongated chambers embedded within the tissues of their host plants. The chambers have a characteristic opening (ostiole) that allows spores to be released, functioning rather like tiny biological dispensers. S. maculiformans is a parasitic fungus that specifically targets lichens in the genus Pseudocyphellaria, creating distinctive brownish spots on the host's surface that can range from small patches of 0.2–1.2 mm to larger confluent zones where multiple infections have merged together. The fungus produces its reproductive structures as densely clustered formations within these infected spots, appearing as tiny, somewhat flattened chambers typically measuring 0.03–0.1 mm across, each with walls composed of 4–10 cellular layers containing specialised cells that produce ascospores. The spores themselves are rod-shaped (bacilliform), measuring about 6.5–10.5 × 1.5–3 micrometres (μm), whilst the fungus also produces larger structures called macroconidia that are somewhat elongated and measure about 4–6 × 1.5 μm. Subhysteropycnis has an apparent role as an early developmental stage of certain Arthonia species, specifically A. badia, demonstrating the complex life cycles some fungi undergo with different forms appearing at different developmental stages. This relationship suggests that what initially appears as simple Subhysteropycnis infections may eventually develop into more complex Arthonia fruiting bodies.
