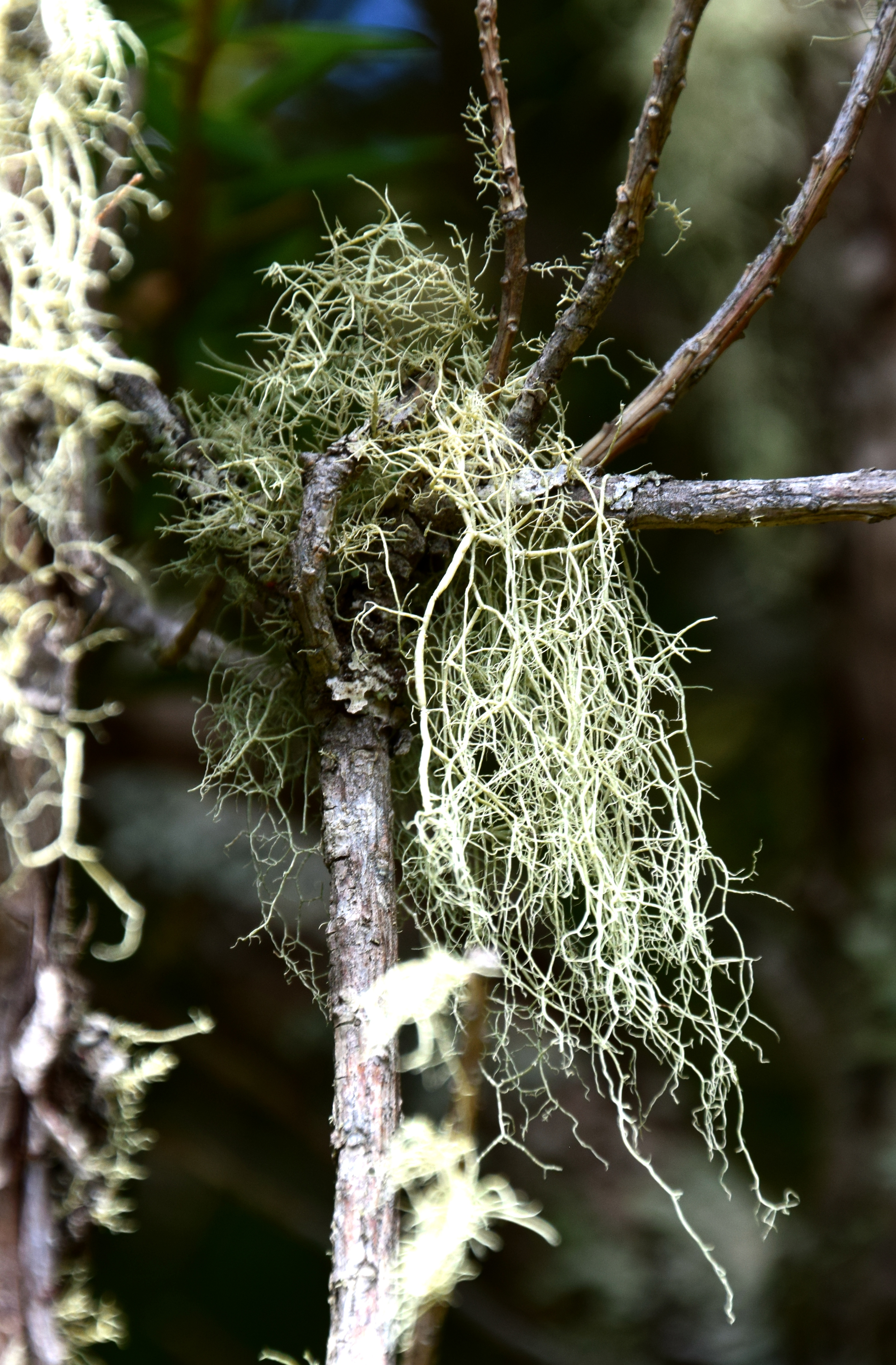
- Yarrumia colensoi on Aoraki / Mount Cook

Scientific classification
- Kingdom: Fungi
- Division: Ascomycota
- Class: Lecanoromycetes
- Order: Peltigerales
- Family: Peltigeraceae
- Genus: Yarrumia; D.J.Galloway (2015)

Type species
- Yarrumia coronata (Müll.Arg.) D.J.Galloway (2015)

Species
- Y. colensoi Y. coronata

= Yarrumia =

Genus of lichen

Yarrumia is a small genus of lichen-forming fungi in the subfamily Lobarioideae of the family Peltigeraceae. It has two foliose species that are found in New Zealand. Lichen products that have been detected in the genus include polyporic acid, pigments and stictane triterpenoids. The genus was established in 2015 and named after the New Zealand scientist James Murray, who first discovered the distinctive chemical compounds in these lichens during the 1950s. These large, leaf-like lichens can spread across bark and moss in patches up to 20 centimetres wide, and are recognised by their golden-yellow interior colouring.

== Taxonomy ==
The genus was circumscribed in 2015 by David John Galloway. The generic name Yarrumia honours James Murray (1923–1961) "who first detected polyporic acid in the two species comprising the genus, and who contributed so much to New Zealand lichenology, subsequent to his initial interest in the chemistry of Yarrumia coronata dating from 1949".

Current classifications place Yarrumia in subfamily Lobarioideae of the Peltigeraceae, where it sits alongside Crocodia, Podostictina and other yellow-medulla lineages. A phylogenomic analysis of 205 nuclear genes published in 2022 recovered Yarrumia as a well-supported clade; it showed ≥ 99.6% identity among Y. colensoi specimens but only about 97.5% identity between Y. colensoi and Y. coronata, corroborating their treatment as separate species within the genus.

== Description ==
Yarrumia forms large, leaf-like lobes that can blanket bark or moss in patches up to 20 cm across—and occasionally twice that size. Although these lobes often elongate into narrow, beard-like strands that dangle from their substrate, each strand still has a distinct upper and lower surface (i.e., it is dorsiventral), so anatomically the thallus remains foliose; accordingly, the New Zealand Plant Conservation Network lists Yarrumia colensoi among the foliose lichens, and Galloway notes the thallus as "orbicular to spreading, often ± pendulous". The upper surface is smooth to faintly wrinkled, whilst the underside carries a sparse layer of pale yellow hairs (a tomentum) broken by tiny yellow pores called pseudocyphellae. These pores act as minute air vents, helping the lichen to breathe by allowing gas exchange through the otherwise waterproof cortex. Inside, the supporting fungal tissue (the medulla) is yellow to orange-red, a pigment suite that immediately separates the genus from most of its relatives.

The partnership that powers the lichen is a green alga housed in rounded cells measuring 3–7 μm wide. In addition, Yarrumia harbours scattered internal cephalodia—dark, knot-like packets that hold cyanobacteria capable of fixing atmospheric nitrogen, thus enriching the lichen's diet.

Reproduction is by conspicuous, stalked discs (pedicellate apothecia) that rise from the lobes like tiny buttons. Each disc is rimmed by a sheath of thallus tissue (the thalline exciple) and sits above a pale yellow-brown hymenial base (hypothecium). The ascospores produced within are ellipsoid, with rounded or slightly pointed tips; they usually develop one to three cross-walls (septa) and measure roughly 30–38 × 9–11 μm, although smaller or larger extremes occur. Chemically the genus is distinguished by polyporic acid—first detected in these species in the 1950s—and a suite of unusual stictane triterpenoids.

== Species ==
Two species are accepted in Yarrumia:

- Yarrumia colensoi (C.Bab.) D.J.Galloway (2015)
- Yarrumia coronata (Müll.Arg.) D.J.Galloway (2015)
