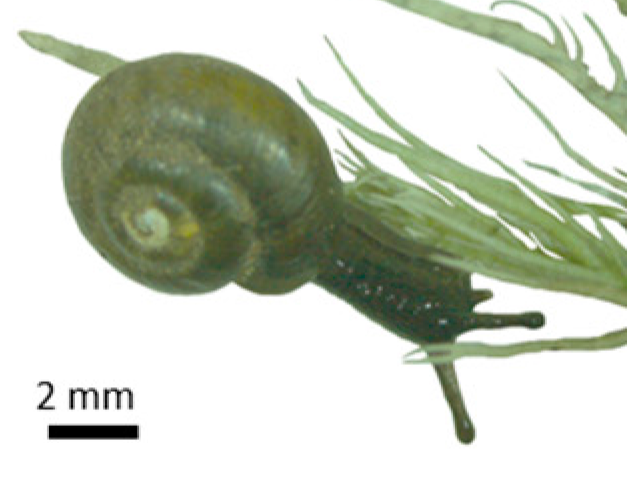
- A live Notodiscus hookeri is eating lichen Usnea taylorii.
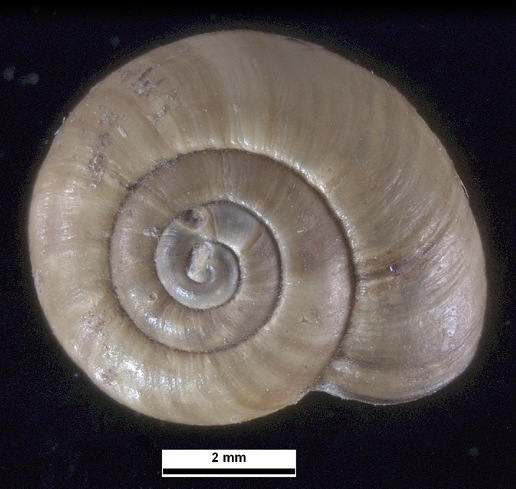
- Apical view of the shell of holotype of Notodiscus hookeri heardensis

Scientific classification
- Kingdom: Animalia
- Phylum: Mollusca
- Class: Gastropoda
- Order: Stylommatophora
- Family: Charopidae
- Subfamily: Charopinae
- Genus: Notodiscus; Thiele, 1931
- Species: N. hookeri

Binomial name
- Notodiscus hookeri (Reeve, 1854)

Synonyms
- Helix hookeri Reeve, 1854; Amphidoxa hookeri (Reeve, 1854)

= Notodiscus =

Species of gastropod

Notodiscus hookeri is a species of small air-breathing land snail, a terrestrial gastropod mollusk in the family Charopidae. It is the only species in the genus Notodiscus. This snail lives on islands in the sub-Antarctic region. Its shell is unique among land snails in that the organic shell layers contain no chitin.

== Taxonomy ==
This species was described under the name Helix hookeri by an English conchologist Lovell Augustus Reeve in 1854. The specific name hookeri is in honor of English botanist Joseph Dalton Hooker, who collected this snail during the Antarctic expedition led by James Clark Ross. Reeve's type description reads in Latin and in English language as follows:

Species 1474 (Mus. Brit.)

Helix hookeri. Hel. testá mediocriter umbilicatá, orbuculari-depressá, sordidè olivaceá, subirrigulariter rugoso-striatá; spirá subplanulatá, suturis impressis; anfractibus quatuor, convexis; aperturá lunato-circulari, labro simplici.
Hooker's Helix. Shell moderately umbilicated, orbicularly depressed, dull olive, rather irregularly roughly striated; spire rather flat, with sutures impressed; whorls four, convex; aperture lunar-circular, lip simple.
Hab. Kerguelen's Land; Dr. J. D. Hooker.
A small depressed species collected by Dr. Hooker in the Antarctic Expedition of the Erebus and Terror, peculiarly characterized by the sombre olive-horny coating of

Paludina and Ampullaria.

Henry Augustus Pilsbry classified this species as Helix hookeri in 1887 or within the genus Amphidoxa as Amphidoxa hookeri within the family Endodontidae in 1894.

Also Alan Solem classified this species within the family Endodontidae in 1968.

A subspecies Notodiscus hookeri heardensis Dell, 1964 was recognized in Heard Island.

== Distribution ==
Notodiscus hookeri has a wide distribution in the sub-Antarctic region. It is the only native terrestrial gastropod species found in the South Indian Ocean islands and archipelagos, and also in the South Atlantic Province:

South Indian Province:

- Crozet Islands. For example, Notodiscus hookeri is the only terrestrial snail among about 50 species of native invertebrates in the Crozet Islands.
- Kerguelen Islands
- Heard Island
- Prince Edward Islands

South Atlantic Province:

- Notodiscus hookeri is limited to South Georgia in the South Atlantic Province.

The type locality is the Kerguelen Islands.

The land snail Notodiscus hookeri is not an endangered or a protected species.

== Shell description ==
Apertural view of a shell of Notodiscus hookeri.

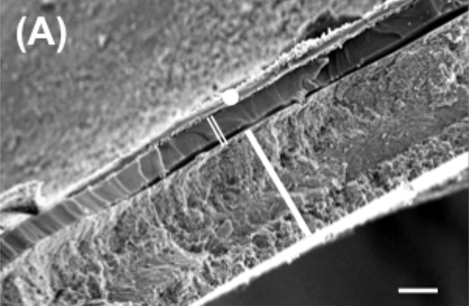
SEM image of the shell micro-scale structure of OL-ecophenotype Notodiscus hookeri. The round white dot marks the outer periostracum. The almost vertical white line shows the organic layer. The thick white line is the innermost mineralised layer. Scale bar is 10 μm.

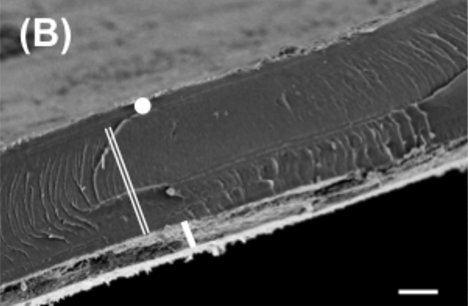
SEM image of the shell structure of OL-ecophenotype Notodiscus hookeri. The round white dot marks the outer periostracum. The double white line is a thick organic layer. The thick white line is the innermost mineralised layer. Scale bar is 10 μm.

The shell growth does not stop on reaching sexual maturity, but decelerates considerably, with the biggest shells measuring 7.5–7.7 mm in size.

Large intraspecific variations in shell morphometrics have been reported for this species on Possession Island, with endemic variants being described as local adaptations to environmentally distinct islands.

The shape of the shell is depressed. The umbilicus is open.

The width of the adult shell is up to 7.5-7.77 mm. The weight of the snail of the shell length 6.13 mm is 52.88 mg.

The micro structure of the shell was analysed by Charrier et al. (2013). Their study was the first to demonstrate that gastropod shell micro structure responds to environmental heterogeneity, leading to the formation of ecophenotypes. The adults of Notodiscus hookeri have evolved into two ecophenotypes, which the authors referred as MS (mineral shell) and OS (organic shell):

- The MS-ecophenotype is characterised by a thick but small mineralised shell. This ecophenotype is primarily found along the coastline, and may be associated with the presence of exchangeable calcium in the clay minerals of the soils.
- The OS-ecophenotype is characterised by a thin but large organic shell. This ecophenotype is primarily found at high altitudes in the mesic and xeric fell-fields, in soils with large particles that lack clay and exchangeable calcium. Snails of the OS-ecophenotype are characterised by thinner and larger shell sizes compared to snails of the MS-ecophenotype, indicating a trade-off between mineral thickness and shell size. The OS-ecophenotype has a highly flexible shell.

Notodiscus hookeri has unique shell micro-scale structure among gastropods:

- A dense and homogeneous organic layer is loosely attached to the upper periostracum and the inner mineral layer.
- In the organic layer of the shell, there is prevalence of glycine-rich proteins (glycine, leucine, isoleucine, valine), and an absence of chitin. Almost all other gastropods with reduced shells have chitin. The only other known example of the absence of chitin is the internal shell of the slug Ariolimax columbianus.

== Ecology ==
This land snail is a gregarious species that lives under moist stones, moss and wet vegetation; however, it is also widespread in fell-field areas, which are characterised by very low vegetation cover. This snail live in relatively simple ecosystems, that is caused by harsh environmental conditions on subantarctic islands. It is a litter-dwelling species.

The soil is known to be a nutrient resource for Notodiscus hookeri, since this species has been found to significantly increase calcium release in solutions derived from plant litter.

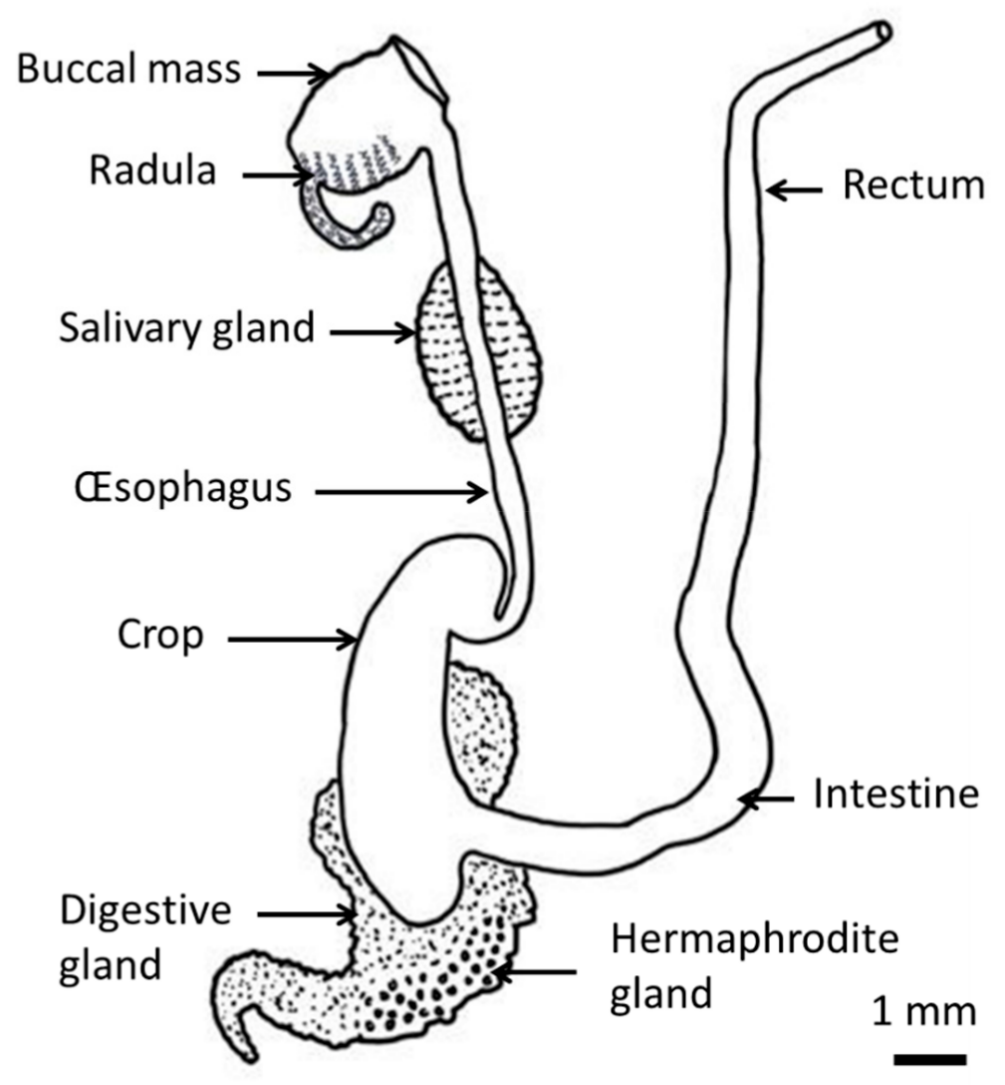
Digestive system of Notodiscus hookeri

Notodiscus hookeri exclusively feeds on lichens such as Orceolina kerguelensis, Usnea taylorii and Pseudocyphellaria crocata. Notodiscus hookeri appears as a generalist lichen feeder able to consume toxic metabolite-containing lichens.

Hatchlings have a shell width of < 2.0 mm. Juveniles have a shell width of about 2.0-4.0 mm. Adults have a shell width larger than 4.0 mm.

The biology of this species is poorly known.

== On a stamp ==
Notodiscus hookeri was depicted on the 2012 €0.60 French Southern and Antarctic Lands postal stamp.

== See also ==
- List of non-avian fauna of Heard Island and McDonald Islands
