= Aspiciliopsis macrophthalma =

Scientific classification
- Kingdom: Fungi
- Division: Ascomycota
- Class: Lecanoromycetes
- Order: Baeomycetales
- Family: Trapeliaceae
- Genus: Aspiciliopsis
- Species: A. macrophthalma

Binomial name
- Aspiciliopsis macrophthalma (Hook.f. & Taylor) B.de Lesd. (1931)

Synonyms
- Urceolaria macrophthalma Hook.f. & Taylor (1844); Lecanora macrophthalma (Hook.f. & Taylor) Nyl. (1858); Placopsis macrophthalma (Hook.f. & Taylor) Nyl. (1877); Placodium macrophthalmum (Hook.f. & Taylor) Müll.Arg. (1884)

Species of lichen-forming fungus

Aspiciliopsis macrophthalma is a species of lichen-forming fungus in the family Trapeliaceae. It is a crust-forming lichen with a thick, brittle-looking thallus that spreads across rock as a cream to pale pinkish-grey patch. The surface is usually continuous but often breaks into sharp-edged cracks, giving it a broken "paving" look, and it can be faintly roughened and patchily dusted with a thin whitish bloom (pruina). Its fruiting bodies are apothecia that sit mostly embedded in the thallus (an aspicilioid form): small, round pits with a pale to dark reddish-brown (sometimes almost blackish) disc, and a thallus-coloured rim that is neatly set off from the surrounding crust by a crack. The thallus also contains embedded cephalodia that may be easiest to pick out when wet, when they can turn a dark purplish-blue and look slightly different in texture from the rest of the thallus.

Under the microscope, the species has a tall, colourless hymenium and produces colourless, broadly ellipsoid ascospores arranged in a single row within each ascus; it also forms long, thread-like conidia in its asexual structures. Molecular work has supported treating Aspiciliopsis as a separate genus rather than leaving the species in Placopsis, because it is more closely related to Orceolina than to other Placopsis species. Chemically, it produces several lichen substances, with 5-O-methylhiascic acid reported as the main compound, alongside smaller amounts of gyrophoric, hiascic, and lecanoric acids. It is an austral lichen with a broad Southern Ocean distribution (especially on subantarctic islands and in southern New Zealand), and it has also been recorded from southern South America, where it has been collected in exposed moorland habitats in Chilean Patagonia.
