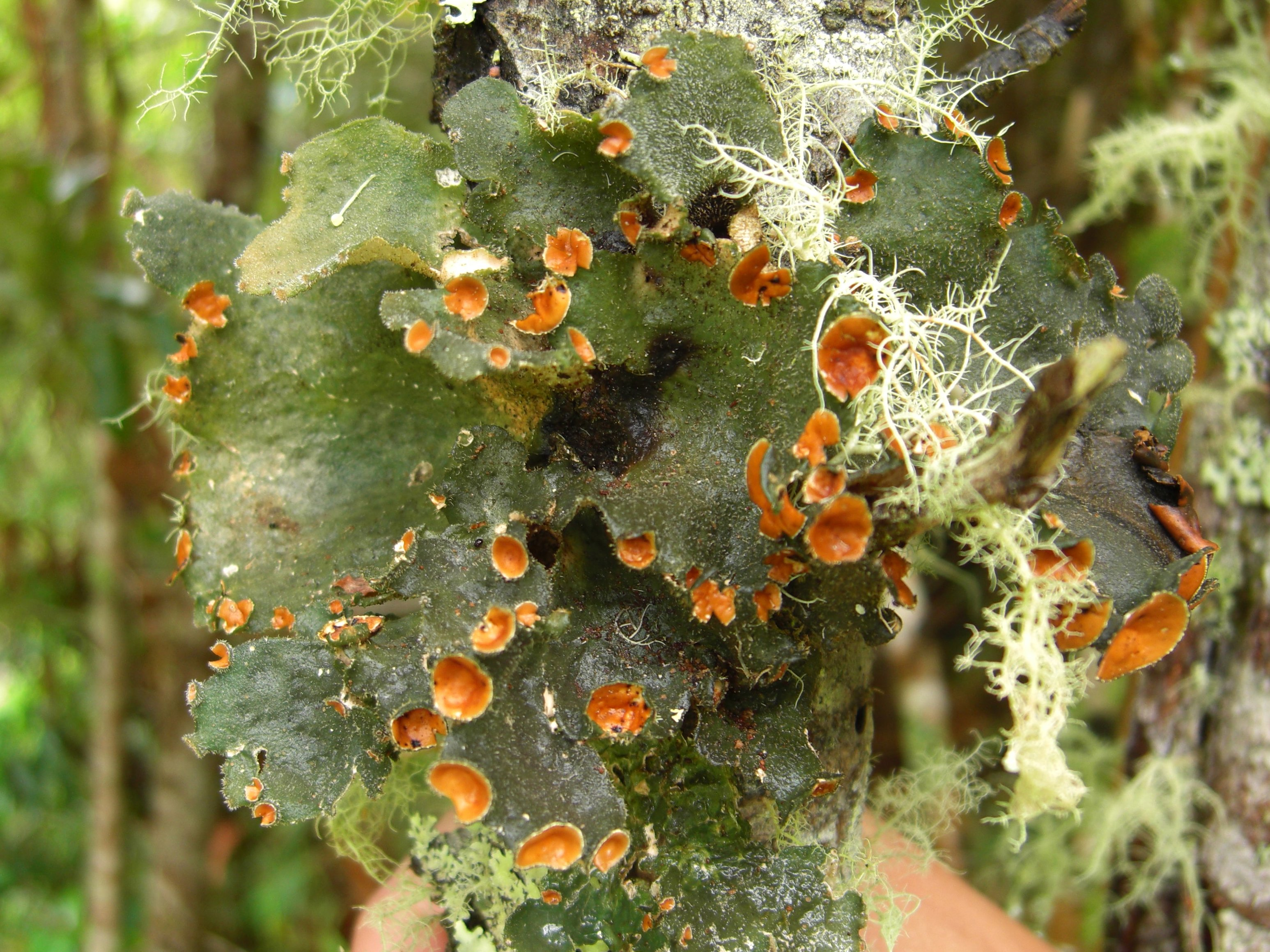
- in Parque Nacional Puyehue, Los Lagos, Chile

Scientific classification
- Domain: Eukaryota
- Kingdom: Fungi
- Division: Ascomycota
- Class: Lecanoromycetes
- Order: Peltigerales
- Family: Peltigeraceae
- Genus: Pseudocyphellaria
- Species: P. hirsuta

Binomial name
- Pseudocyphellaria hirsuta (Mont.) Malme (1899)

Synonyms
- Sticta hirsuta Mont. (1835); Stictina hirsuta (Mont.) Nyl. (1861); Cyanisticta hirsuta (Mont.) Räsänen (1936); Parmostictina hirsuta (Mont.) B.Moncada (2014)

= Pseudocyphellaria hirsuta =

Species of lichen-forming fungus

Pseudocyphellaria hirsuta is a species of foliose lichen in the family Peltigeraceae. First described in 1835, it has undergone several taxonomic revisions over nearly two centuries. The lichen forms a flat, leaf-like structure (thallus) that can grow up to 27 cm in diameter, typically appearing grey or brown and covered in fine hairs. It is characterised by small pore-like structures called pseudocyphellae on its lower surface, which can be yellow or, less commonly, white. P. hirsuta grows mainly on trees in forested areas, particularly those dominated by southern beech (Nothofagus) species, but can also be found on rocks, soil, and stumps. The species is widely distributed in Argentina and Chile, from central regions to Tierra del Fuego, and has been observed in various forest types and elevations.

== Taxonomy ==
Pseudocyphellaria hirsuta has a complex taxonomic history that spans nearly two centuries. The species was first described as Sticta hirsuta by Camille Montagne in 1835, based on specimens collected by D. Bertero in Chile in 1828. The species underwent several taxonomic revisions over the years. In 1861, William Nylander transferred it to the (now historical) genus Stictina, recognising its distinctive blue-green photobiont. This classification was widely used for several decades. However, the current accepted name, Pseudocyphellaria hirsuta, was proposed by Gustaf Oskar Andersson Malme in 1899 and has since been adopted by most modern lichenologists.

The taxonomic journey of P. hirsuta was not without confusion. Joseph Hooker in 1847 and briefly Nylander in 1860 considered it a synonym of Sticta obvoluta, primarily due to the presence of yellow pseudocyphellae. This error was soon corrected by Nylander himself. Additionally, Franz Meyen and Julius von Flotow in 1843 erroneously listed an undescribed species, Sticta pilosa, as a synonym of S. hirsuta, further complicating its taxonomic history.

In 1936, Veli Räsänen attempted to transfer the species to the genus Cyanisticta, but this classification did not gain widespread acceptance among lichenologists. A form, P. hirsuta f. leucosticta, was proposed by Elke Mackenzie in 1955 to describe individuals with white instead of yellow pseudocyphellae. However, due to the variable nature of pigment deposition in this species, this subspecific designation was not widely used in later treatments. In 2014, Bibiana Moncada proposed a transfer to the genus Parmostictina, but this genus name has been rejected against Pseudocyphellaria and is considered synonymous with that genus.

== Description ==
Pseudocyphellaria hirsuta is a foliose (leafy) lichen with a thallus that ranges from roughly circular to irregular in shape, typically measuring between 4 and 10 cm in diameter, though it can grow as large as 27 cm. The thallus attaches centrally to substrates like twigs, bark, rocks, and soil, with its lobes remaining free at the margins. These lobes are broadly rounded and can vary in size from 2 to 15 mm in diameter. The margins of the lobes are mostly smooth, slightly sinuous or shallowly folded, and can occasionally bear small, leaf-like structures known as phyllidia. The lower surface of the thallus is often thickened and may have ridges or be slightly rolled, with a dense covering of hair-like structures. The upper surface of the thallus is typically dull grey to bluish-grey when wet, and shifts to pale buff-grey, brown, or olive when dry. It can be slightly wrinkled or pitted and is usually covered in short to long, silky white hairs. In some areas, these hairs are more sparse or only found at the margins, while in other parts, the surface may be almost smooth except at the edges. The cortex beneath the hairs is somewhat leathery and can sometimes appear roughened.

Pseudocyphellaria hirsuta does not produce soredia, isidia, or maculae, which are common reproductive or structural features in other lichen species. Phyllidia are present occasionally, particularly along the margins, where they are irregular and densely covered in hairs. The medulla, or inner tissue layer, is white. The lower surface of the thallus is often wrinkled, with a pale buff to brownish colouration. It is typically covered in a soft, velvety layer of tomentum, a dense mat of fine hairs, which is whitish at the edges and browner towards the centre. Scattered across this surface are small, yellow structures called pseudocyphellae, which are slightly sunken and appear as tiny warts without a defined border.

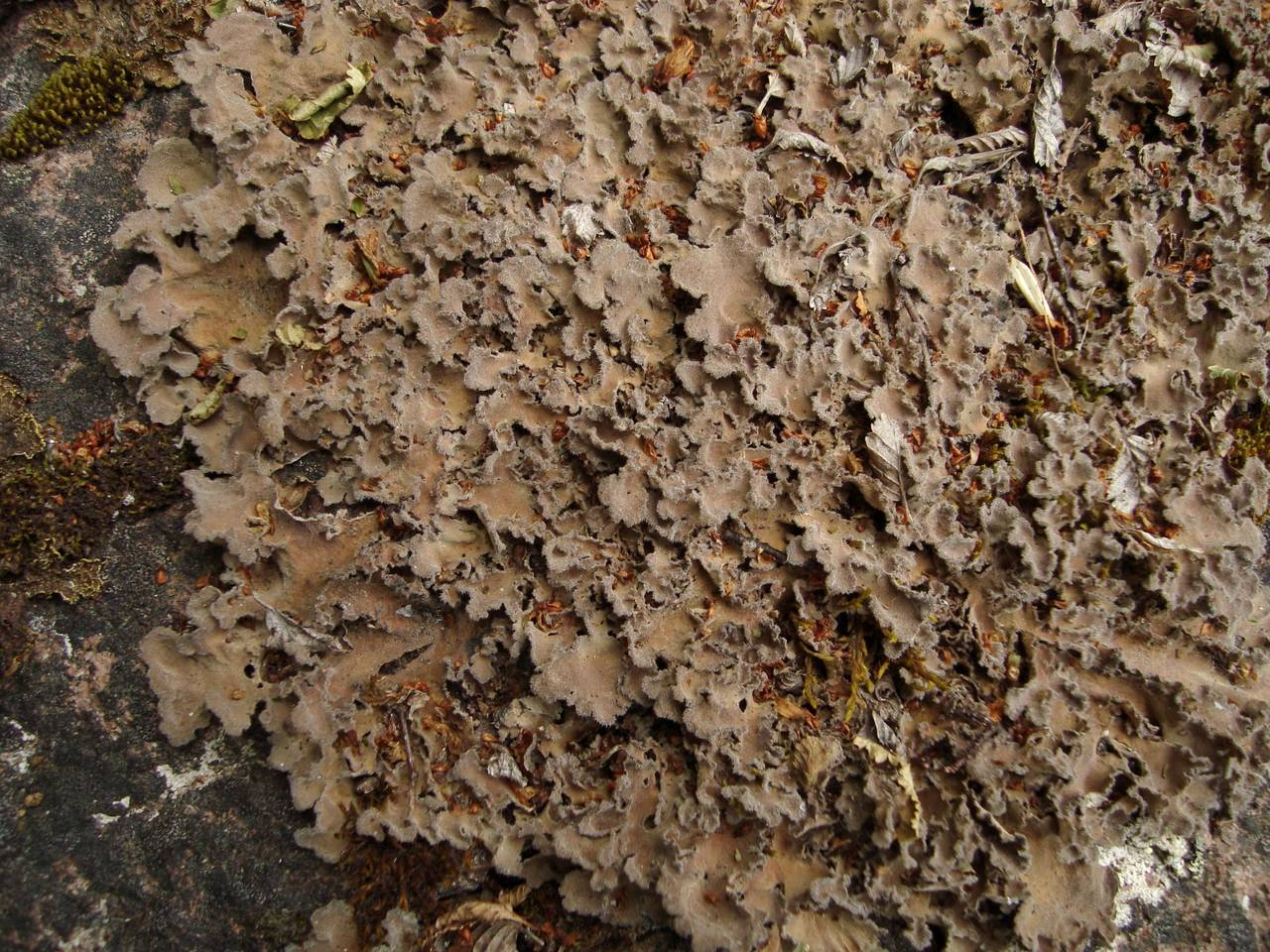
Found on a partially sun-exposed boulder in open, relatively high, dry, Nothofagus forest in Chile

The apothecia (fruiting bodies) are usually found along the edges or just inside the margins of the thallus. These structures are relatively prominent and, at maturity, sit on small stalks, with the base of the stalk forming a distinct concavity on the lower surface. They range from 0.5 to 8 mm in diameter, occasionally reaching up to 12 mm. The margins of the apothecia are densely hairy and often curl inwards, obscuring the disc at first, though they may become less hairy with age. The disc itself starts concave but flattens over time, with a pale to dark red-brown colour. The exciple (a rim around the disc) is also densely hairy, matching the colour of the thallus, and may have a rough, warty texture.

In terms of anatomy, the thallus is 150 to 285 μm thick, with the upper cortex measuring 28 to 38 μm thick. The photobiont layer, where the lichen's cyanobacteria partner Nostoc resides, is 28 to 56 μm thick. The medulla is 70 to 150 μm thick, and the lower cortex is 28 to 40 μm thick, consisting of several rows of cells. The apothecia's structure is similar to the thallus, with the exciple containing the photobiont. The hymenium, where the spores are produced, is 70 to 80 μm tall and is topped with an epithecium that dissolves in potassium hydroxide solution (K). The spores themselves are 25 to 36 μm long and 5.5 to 9.0 μm wide, with one to three septa.

Chemically, Pseudocyphellaria hirsuta contains calycin, pulvinic acid, and pulvinic dilactone. However, some specimens that lack these pigments do not show any detectable chemical compounds when analysed using thin-layer chromatography.

=== Similar species ===
The Chilean endemic Pseudocyphellaria dasyphyllidia shares similarities with P. hirsuta, but can be distinguished by its narrower, more finely divided lobes, true phyllidia on margins and surfaces, and generally smaller apothecia. P. dasyphyllidia is typically less hairy, with hairs restricted to lobe margins and phyllidia, and has more prominent yellow pseudocyphellae associated with these structures. It produces smaller spores and is better adapted to drier, sunnier environments compared to P. hirsuta, which prefers humid, lower-altitude forests. However, there is some overlap in their ecological preferences, as P. hirsuta can occasionally be found in similar dry and sunny habitats.

== Habitat and distribution ==
Pseudocyphellaria hirsuta is primarily found in southern South America, with specimens recorded from Argentina and Chile. The species has a wide distribution within these countries, ranging from central Chile to Tierra del Fuego and Staten Island in Argentina.

In Argentina, P. hirsuta has been collected from several provinces, including Neuquén, Río Negro, Chubut, and Tierra del Fuego. In Chile, it has been found in various locations from Valparaíso Province in the north to Magallanes Province in the south, including the island of Chiloé.

This lichen species shows a preference for forested habitats, particularly those dominated by Nothofagus species. It has been frequently collected from Nothofagus dombeyi, N. obliqua, and N. pumilio. Other host trees include Araucaria, Austrocedrus, and Fuchsia magellanica. P. hirsuta has also been found growing on Berberis ilicifolia, particularly in the southernmost parts of its range.

While primarily an epiphytic species growing on tree bark, P. hirsuta has also been observed growing on rocks, soil, and stumps, especially in deforested areas or on rocky, forestless slopes. It occurs in various forest types, including Araucaria-Nothofagus mixed forests and Austrocedrus forests. The species has been collected at various elevations, from coastal areas to mountainous regions.

Two forms of P. hirsuta have been documented: one with yellow pseudocyphellae, which appears to be more common, and another with white pseudocyphellae, which has been collected less frequently but from similar habitats and regions.
