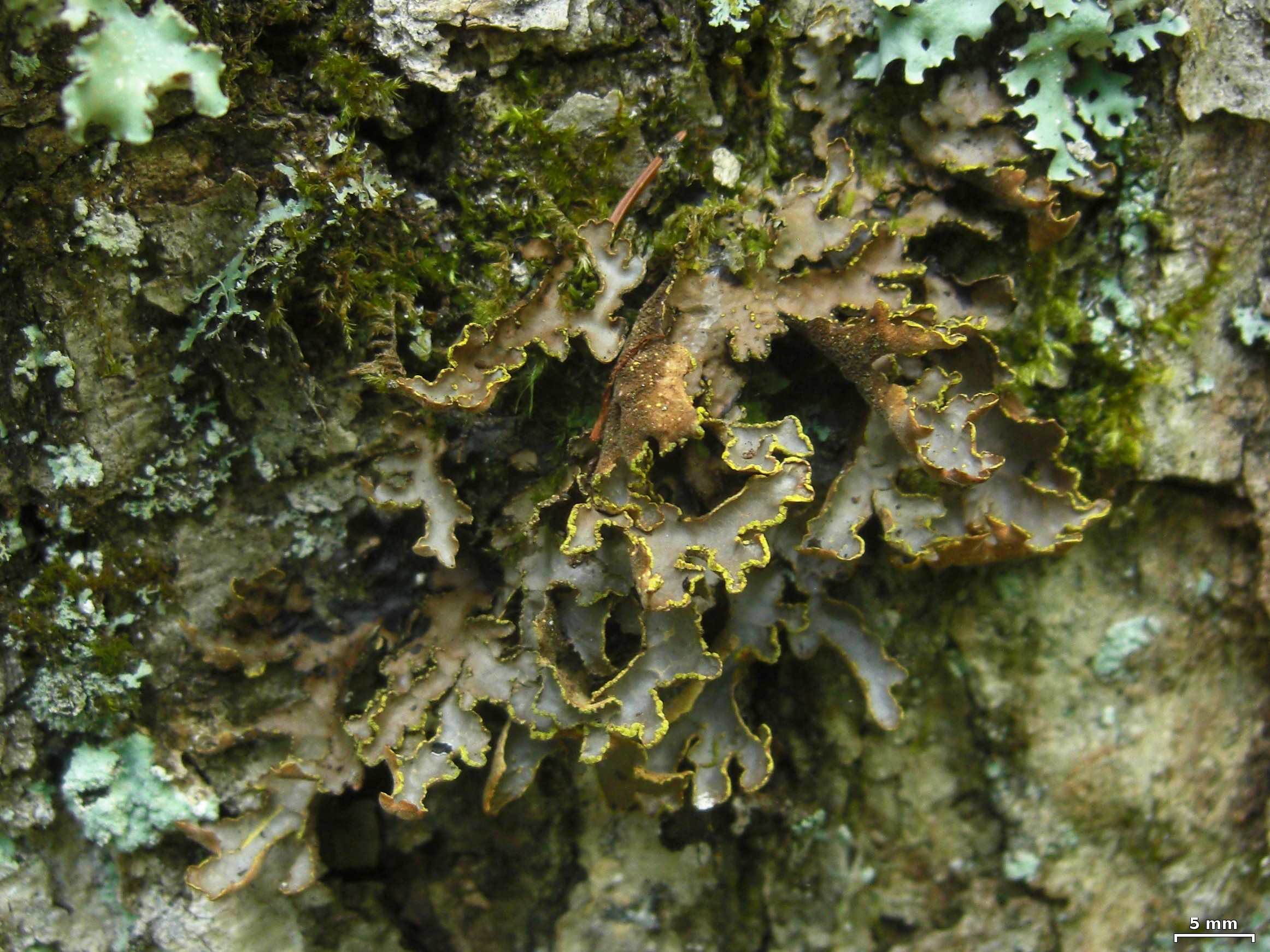

Scientific classification
- Domain: Eukaryota
- Kingdom: Fungi
- Division: Ascomycota
- Class: Lecanoromycetes
- Order: Peltigerales
- Family: Peltigeraceae
- Genus: Pseudocyphellaria
- Species: P. perpetua

Binomial name
- Pseudocyphellaria perpetua McCune & Miądl. (2002)

= Pseudocyphellaria perpetua =

Species of lichen

Pseudocyphellaria perpetua is a species of corticolous (bark-dwelling), foliose (leafy) cyanolichen in the family Peltigeraceae. It was described as new to science in 2002 by lichenologists Bruce McCune and Jolanta Miądlikowska. It is distinguished from similar species, including some forms of P. crocata, by its yellow medulla and mostly marginal soralia. Other characteristics include its narrow, linear lobes, and its pale lower undersurface. Some molecular phylogenetic analysis suggests that Pseudocyphellaria perpetua and P. crocata are morphotypes of the same phylogenetic species. P. perpetua occurs on both conifer and hardwood trees in oceanic areas of the western North America and in the Russian Far East. It has also been documented as an uncommon species in Nova Scotia (eastern Canada).
