= Aspiciliopsis =

Scientific classification
- Domain: Eukaryota
- Kingdom: Fungi
- Division: Ascomycota
- Class: Lecanoromycetes
- Order: Baeomycetales
- Family: Trapeliaceae
- Genus: Aspiciliopsis (Müll.Arg.) M.Choisy (1929)

Type species
- Aspiciliopsis macrophthalma (Hook.f. & Taylor) B.de Lesd. (1931)

Species
- A. antarctica A. macrophthalma

Synonyms
- Lecanora sect. Aspiciliopsis (Müll.Arg.) Zahlbr. (1928); Placodium sect. Aspiciliopsis Müll.Arg. (1884)

Genus of lichens

Aspiciliopsis is a genus of lichen-forming fungi in the family Trapeliaceae. It has two species, both of which occur in the Southern Hemisphere.

== Taxonomy ==
Swiss lichenologist Johannes Müller Argoviensis first proposed Aspiciliopsis as a section of the genus Placodium in 1884. Maurice Choisy promoted it to genus status in 1929. The genus name refers to the Aspicilia-like appearance of the apothecia, which are immersed in the thallus.

In a 1997 publication, H. Thorsten Lumbsch suggested that there were no significant differences between Aspiciliopsis and Placopsis, and thus he considered it unnecessary to retain Aspiciliopsis as a distinct genus. Later molecular phylogenetics work ultimately showed that the type species of Aspiciliopsis, A. macrophthalma, as well as two species of Orceolina, made up a distinct clade nested within Placopsis. This led to the resurrection of Aspiciliopsis as a monospecific genus distinct from both Orceolopsis and Placopsis.

== Description ==
The thallus of Aspiciliopsis is thick and crust-like, spreading irregularly and forming shallow lobes along its edges. The surface varies in colour from a pale olive-green to grey-green when wet, and a light pinkish white to grey-white or off-white when dry. The surface can be minutely roughened to papillate and usually has white pruina at the edges. It lacks isidia, pseudocyphellae, or soredia — types of vegetative reproduction structures commonly found in other lichens.

The cortex, or outer layer of the lichen, is pseudoparenchymatous, comprising cells 10–15 μm in diameter. The medulla, or inner part, is thick and white. The lichen associates with a unicellular, chlorococcoid green alga for photosynthesis. In the thallus, there are cephalodia that are flush with the thallus surface, minutely wrinkled to irregularly or radially cracked. These cephalodia are home to cyanobacteria, specifically either Nostoc or Scytonema species.

The ascomata, or reproductive structures of the lichen, are innate and prominent. The disc is reddish-pink when moist and dark red-brown to black when dry. The thalline margin, a collar of thalline tissue, separates from the disc by a narrow to gaping crack. The proper margin is lighter than the disc, up to 35 μm thick, and made up of hyaline, thin-walled hyphae up to 3 μm in diameter. The hymenium, or layer of the ascocarp where spores are produced, is colourless and typically measures 150–230 μm tall. The paraphyses, sterile cells interspersed among the asci, are slender and occasionally branch and anastomose, with slightly thickened tips. The asci are cylindrical, Trapelia-type, with a thin amyloid wall and without apical amyloid structures, containing eight spores. Ascospores are arranged in a single row within the ascus and are simple, broadly ellipsoidal, colourless, and thin-walled.

Conidiomata, structures that produce asexual spores called conidia, are immersed in the thallus and measure 250–275 by 130–150 μm in diameter. Their ostioles are small, slightly depressed, and range from pale to dark red-brown in colour. The conidiophores are of the Roccella-type.

Lichen products that occur in Aspiciliopsis are 5-O-methylhiascic acid, gyrophoric acid, hiascic acid, and lecanoric acid.

== Species ==
- Aspiciliopsis antarctica (Müll.Arg.) C.W.Dodge (1948)
- Aspiciliopsis macrophthalma (Hook.f. & Taylor) B.de Lesd. (1931)
