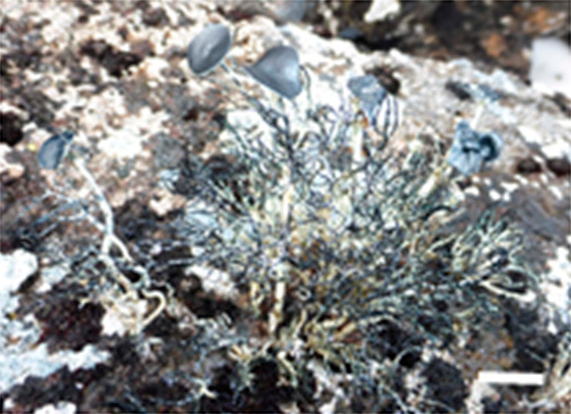

Scientific classification
- Domain: Eukaryota
- Kingdom: Fungi
- Division: Ascomycota
- Class: Lecanoromycetes
- Order: Lecanorales
- Family: Parmeliaceae
- Genus: Usnea
- Species: U. taylorii

Binomial name
- Usnea taylorii Hook.f. & Taylor (1844)

= Usnea taylorii =

Species of lichen

Usnea taylorii is a fruticose lichen in the family Parmeliaceae.

== Ecology ==
Its predators include the land snail Notodiscus hookeri.

== See also ==
- List of Usnea species
