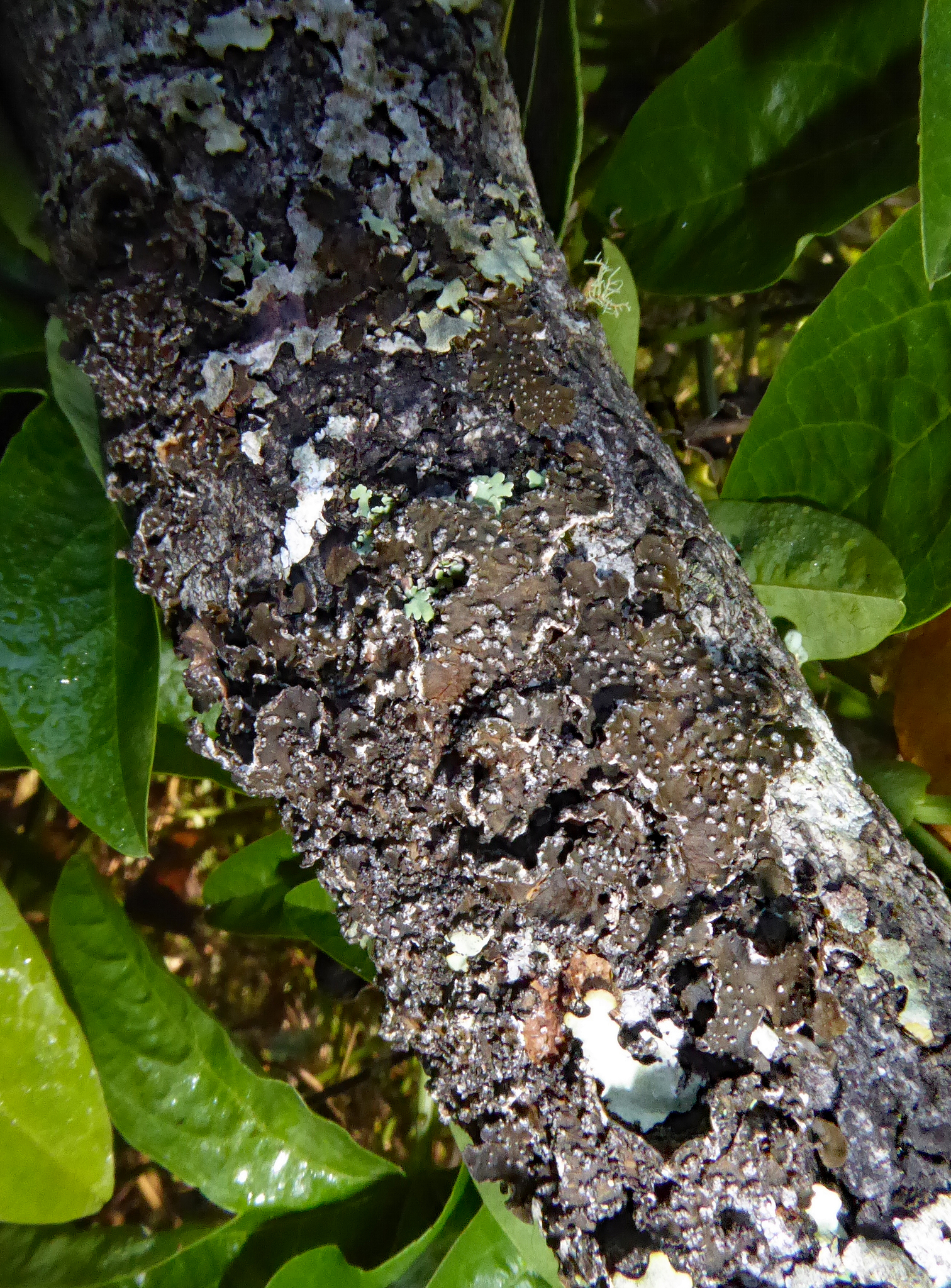

Scientific classification
- Kingdom: Fungi
- Division: Ascomycota
- Class: Lecanoromycetes
- Order: Peltigerales
- Family: Peltigeraceae
- Genus: Pseudocyphellaria
- Species: P. haywardiorum

Binomial name
- Pseudocyphellaria haywardiorum D.J.Galloway (1988)

= Pseudocyphellaria haywardiorum =

Species of lichen

Pseudocyphellaria haywardiorum is a species of corticolous (bark-dwelling), foliose lichen in the family Peltigeraceae. It is found in New Zealand, where it is considered "at risk" under the New Zealand Threat Classification System. Pseudocyphellaria haywardiorum has a more or less circular thallus measuring 30–80 mm in diameter, loosely attached from its edges to its centre, featuring rising wavy margins with rounded lobes that overlap in a complex pattern. The upper surface varies in colour from dark grey-blue to brown-black, becoming darker at the lobe tips when moist, and displays a spectrum of colours including dark olive-brown to pale yellowish with greyish edges when dry, while the underside is either bubbly or unevenly wrinkled with a tomentum ranging from red-brown to black-brown, and white pseudocyphellae especially noticeable in the central region.

== Taxonomy ==
The species was formally described as new to science in 1988 by the lichenologist David Galloway. The species epithet honours Bruce and Glenys Hayward, "for their collections of, and researches into, lichens of the offshore islands of northern New Zealand". They collected the type specimen in 1971 on Red Mercury Island, where it was growing on the bark of a tea tree (genus Leptospermum).

== Description ==
The thallus of Pseudocyphellaria haywardiorum is more or less circular, measuring 30–80 mm in diameter. This lichen loosely attaches from its edges to its centre. The edges of the thallus appear to rise slightly and display rounded lobes, spanning 2–20 mm in length and 4–25 mm in width. These lobes stand apart but touch each other and have a complex overlapping pattern.

The lichen's margins are sinuous, rising weakly with an irregular formation ranging from finely to coarsely jagged. The underbelly of the lichen occasionally presents soredia – small reproductive propagules – and has a greyish-white, eroded appearance. The upper surface showcases a spectrum of colours from dark grey-blue to brown-black, particularly becoming darker at the lobe tips when moist. When dry, the central area can vary from dark olive-brown to a pale yellowish tint with greyish edges. The surface texture can be flat or slightly wavy, with the tips more wrinkled and the remainder distinctly dotted.

Additionally, the upper surface is matte, ranging from smooth to minutely spiderweb-like in parts. Depending on its state, it feels either leathery to brittle when dry or soft and limp when wet. It is sorediate, and it lacks phyllidia or pseudocyphellae. Small, irregular light buff-coloured spots (maculae) can be seen, forming a mesh-like patterns towards the lobe tips. Sometimes, these spots form larger patches that lack photobionts.

The soredia of the lichen is dark brownish-blue, transitioning to a pale grey, and often appears to erode to white. These are coarse and resemble crowded, false isidia. The soredia clusters, which can be up to 0.5 mm in diameter, can either be dispersed, densely packed, or even merge to form extensive sorediate to pseudoisidiate crusts. The lichen's inner layer (medulla) is white, and its photosynthetic partner is from the cyanobacterial genus Nostoc.

The lichen's underside has a surface that is either bubbly or unevenly wrinkled. The edges are a pale buff or brown shade with a smooth appearance, while the rest is densely covered in hair-like structures (tomentum) ranging in colour from red-brown to black-brown. This tomentum is shorter and velvety near the margins but extends to a woolly texture towards the centre. White pseudocyphellae, another feature of the lichen, stand out against the tomentum, especially in the central region. These structures are sparse along the edges and measure between 0.1 and 2.0 mm in diameter. They are easily distinguishable due to their raised, pale-buff border and have a surface ranging from concave to convex with a granular texture.

== Habitat and distribution ==
On Raoul Island, it is known from fragmentary specimens collected from amongst the debris of Kermadec pōhutukawa that were toppled by a cyclone, suggesting that in that location it inhabits the upper tree canopy. In Kohimarama, where it is quite rare, it has been found growing on the trunks of cabbage trees and on fallen dead branches.

== Conservation ==
In the New Zealand Threat Classification System, Pseudocyphellaria haywardiorum is listed as NU ("At Risk: Naturally Uncommon").
