= Geoffrey Charles Bratt =

Australian chemist and lichenologist (1931–1978)

Geoffrey Charles Bratt (8 January 1931 – 16 October 1977) was an Australian chemist and lichenologist.

== Life and career ==
Bratt was born in Hobart, Tasmania. In 1952, he earned a Bachelor of Science degree in applied chemistry from the University of Tasmania. That year, he started working at the Electrolytic Zinc Company as a research scientist. He held this position for three years before leaving to enter the Imperial College of Science in London to start a PhD degree. He completed this in 1959 and thereafter returned to the Electrolytic Zinc Company, again as a research scientist; by the time of his death he was the Senior Principle Research Officer. He investigated methods of purification and electrodeposition of zinc, and published several patents regarding this and the purification and recovery of other metals.

As a result of his lifelong interest in bushwalking, Bratt joined the Imperial College Exploring Society Karakorum Expedition conducted in 1957–58, the aim of which was to scale the world's second-highest mountain peak. Although the expedition did not climb this peak, they did manage to successfully climb K10. As a member of the British Glaciological Society he accepted an invitation from Eric Shipton to join an expedition to Patagonia in 1958–59. It was here that he met lichenologist Peter Wilfred James, who stimulated his interest in lichens. After returning to Australia, he set up a herbarium in his home in West Moonah, and added many lichens to his collections from numerous bushwalking trips in Tasmania. After suffering kidney failure in 1974, he had to forgo major expeditions, but he was able to spend more time with the specimens in his herbarium, and most of his lichen publications were published after that.

== Memberships and awards ==
- member of the Royal Geographical Society in 1959
- life membership of the Royal Society of Tasmania in 1965
- appointed Honorary Research Associate in the Department of Botany at the University of Tasmania in 1969
- Hofmann Prize for extractive metallurgy in 1971 (shared with R.W. Pickering)

== Eponyms ==
Several lichen taxa have been named to honour Bratt. These include Cladonia enantia var. brattii Kantvilas (2013); Menegazzia brattii Kantvilas (2012); Parmelia brattii Essl. (1976); Pseudocyphellaria brattii D.J.Galloway & Kantvilas (1997); Rinodina brattii H.Mayrhofer (1984); and Vouauxiomyces brattii S.Y.Kondr. (1996).
