= Pseudocyphellaria allanii =

Scientific classification
- Domain: Eukaryota
- Kingdom: Fungi
- Division: Ascomycota
- Class: Lecanoromycetes
- Order: Peltigerales
- Family: Peltigeraceae
- Genus: Pseudocyphellaria
- Species: P. allanii

Binomial name
- Pseudocyphellaria allanii D.J.Galloway (1982)

Species of lichen

Pseudocyphellaria allanii is a species of corticolous (bark-dwelling) and foliose (leafy) lichen in the family Peltigeraceae. Found in New Zealand, it was formally described as a new species in 1982 by Bernd Renner and David Galloway. The type specimen was collected by Galloway on the path to Emily Falls on Mount Peel (South Canterbury); here it was found growing on a fallen Pseudowintera on a stream bank. The lichen contains the secondary compounds 7β-acetoxyhopan-22-ol and hopan-15α-22-diol, which are derivatives of the triterpene compound hopane. The specific epithet allanii honours New Zealand botanist Harry Allan, who "described the vegetation of Mt Peel, and who later promoted interest in New Zealand lichens".
