= Orceolina kerguelensis =

Scientific classification
- Domain: Eukaryota
- Kingdom: Fungi
- Division: Ascomycota
- Class: Lecanoromycetes
- Order: Baeomycetales
- Family: Trapeliaceae
- Genus: Orceolina
- Species: O. kerguelensis

Binomial name
- Orceolina kerguelensis (Tuck.) Hertel (1970)

Synonyms
- Urceolina kerguelensis Tuck. (1875)

Species of lichen

Orceolina kerguelensis is a saxicolous (rock-dwelling) crustose lichen in the family Trapeliaceae. It is the type species of the genus Orceolina. The species is endemic to subantarctic islands in the southern Indian and Atlantic oceans, where it grows on exposed basaltic and granitic rocks from sea level to alpine elevations. With its thick cortex and bright orange colouration that fades to wax-yellow in shade, this lichen is adapted to the harsh, wind-swept environments of isolated subantarctic territories.

== Taxonomy ==
Orceolina kerguelensis was first described by Edward Tuckerman in 1875 as Urceolina kerguelensis, based on material collected during the United States Transit-of-Venus expedition to the Kerguelen Islands. Because Urceolina was pre-occupied by an 1828 plant name, Hannes Hertel introduced the replacement genus Orceolina in 1970 and made the new combination O. kerguelensis. Subsequent authors placed the genus in the Trapeliaceae.

== Description ==
This is a rock-dwelling (saxicolous) crustose lichen that forms irregular patches 3–4 cm across. The thallus surface is bright orange in open sites but fades to wax-yellow in shaded crevices. It appears verrucose-areolate—that is, broken into warty, roughly polygonal blocks up to about 1 mm wide—and the centre of each block can be 1.5–2 mm tall, giving the colony a bumpy texture. An unusually thick outer skin (cortex)—over 1.2 mm at the centre—makes up most of the thallus. This cortex consists of densely packed fungal threads (hyphae) arranged perpendicular to the surface, while upright columns of green algal cells (a Coccomyxa-like photobiont) periodically pierce the cortex almost to the surface, supplying photosynthate even through the thick wall. Beneath the cortex, the internal tissue (medulla) is thin and ill-defined, mingling with mineral grains from the underlying rock.

Small urn-shaped (urceolate) fruiting bodies (apothecia) are common. They begin as tiny pores within the areoles and expand to 0.5–0.7 mm in diameter, remaining flush with the surface. Around each pore the thallus darkens to brown-black, sometimes carrying a faint white bloom. Internally, the apothecial cup is lined with colourless tissue and slender unbranched paraphyses. Each cylindrical ascus holds eight colourless, single-celled ascospores measuring 25–29 × 16–19 micrometres (μm). Microscopic asexual structures (pycnidia) produce curved, thread-like conidia 15–25 μm long. No lichen products were detected in O. kerguelensis by high-performance thin-layer chromatography.

== Habitat and distribution ==
Orceolina kerguelensis is a non-maritime species of the subantarctic zone. It occurs from near sea level to about 650 m in both lowland and alpine situations, invariably on exposed basaltic or granitic rocks and pebbles where wind and desiccation keep competing vegetation sparse. The lichen is frequent, though seldom abundant, across the western and upland parts of the Kerguelen archipelago, and equally common on Crozet Islands. Beyond these French Southern Territories it has been recorded on Marion Island and Prince Edward Islands in the southern Indian Ocean and on Heard Island in the southern Atlantic sector, suggesting a distribution that tracks cold, oceanic climates of isolated subantarctic islands.

== Ecology ==
Its predators include the land snail Notodiscus hookeri.
