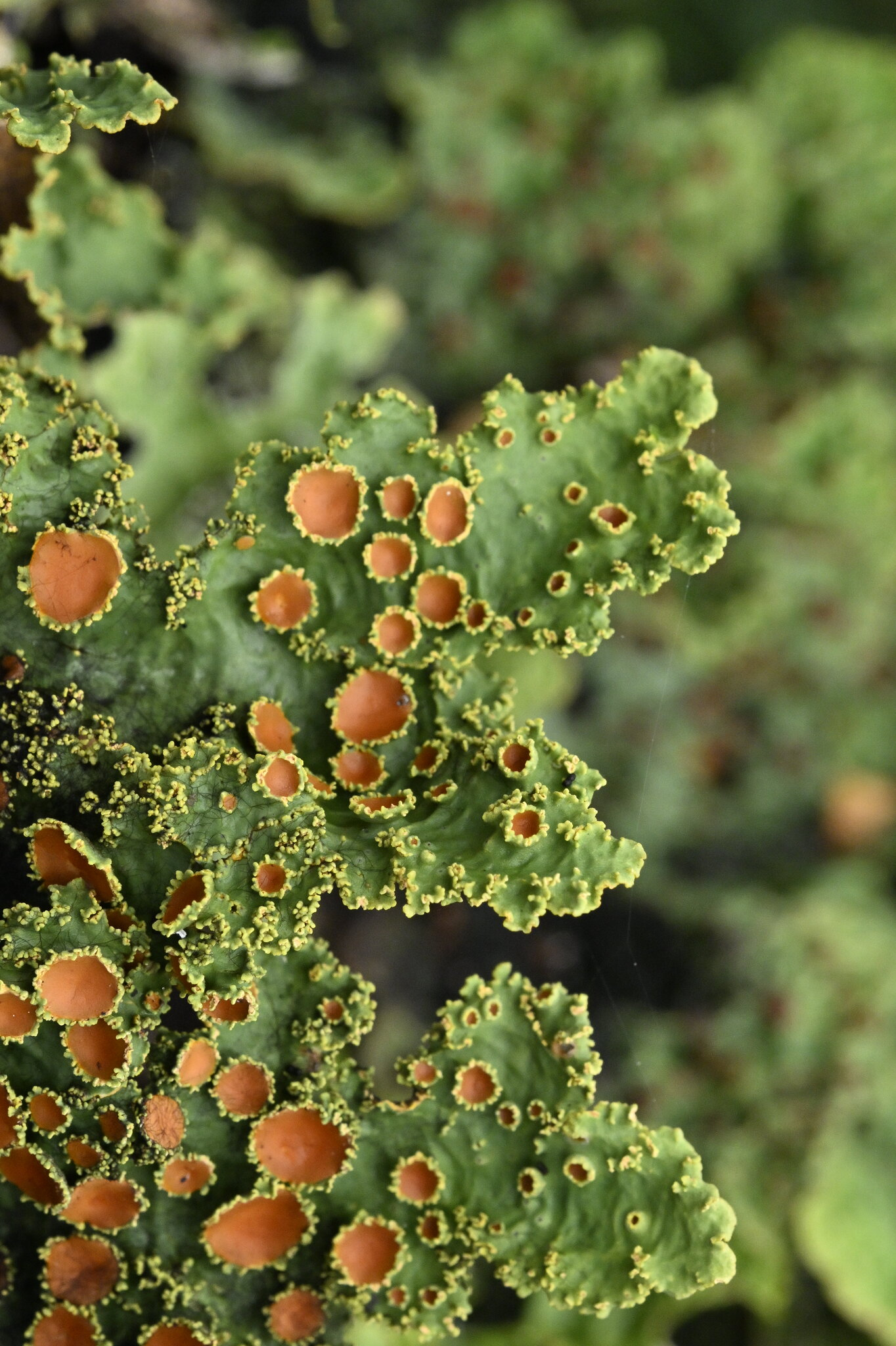
- Yarrumia colensoi near Mount Owen (New Zealand)

Conservation status
- Not Threatened (NZ TCS)

Scientific classification
- Kingdom: Fungi
- Division: Ascomycota
- Class: Lecanoromycetes
- Order: Peltigerales
- Family: Peltigeraceae
- Genus: Yarrumia
- Species: Y. colensoi

Binomial name
- Yarrumia colensoi (C.Bab.) D.J.Galloway

= Yarrumia colensoi =

Species of lichen

Yarrumia colensoi is a species of lichen. It occurs in New Zealand, but is not endemic.

== Description ==
This species is glaucous green, with a dimpled, wide, lobed upper surface. There are yellowish isidiate margins, and a light brown undersurface with pseudocyphellae.

== Ecology ==
It is known to grow on southern beech, podocarps, and other trees.

== Etymology ==
The species name is derived from William Colenso. The cave wētā Maotaweta virescens will feed on it in captivity.
