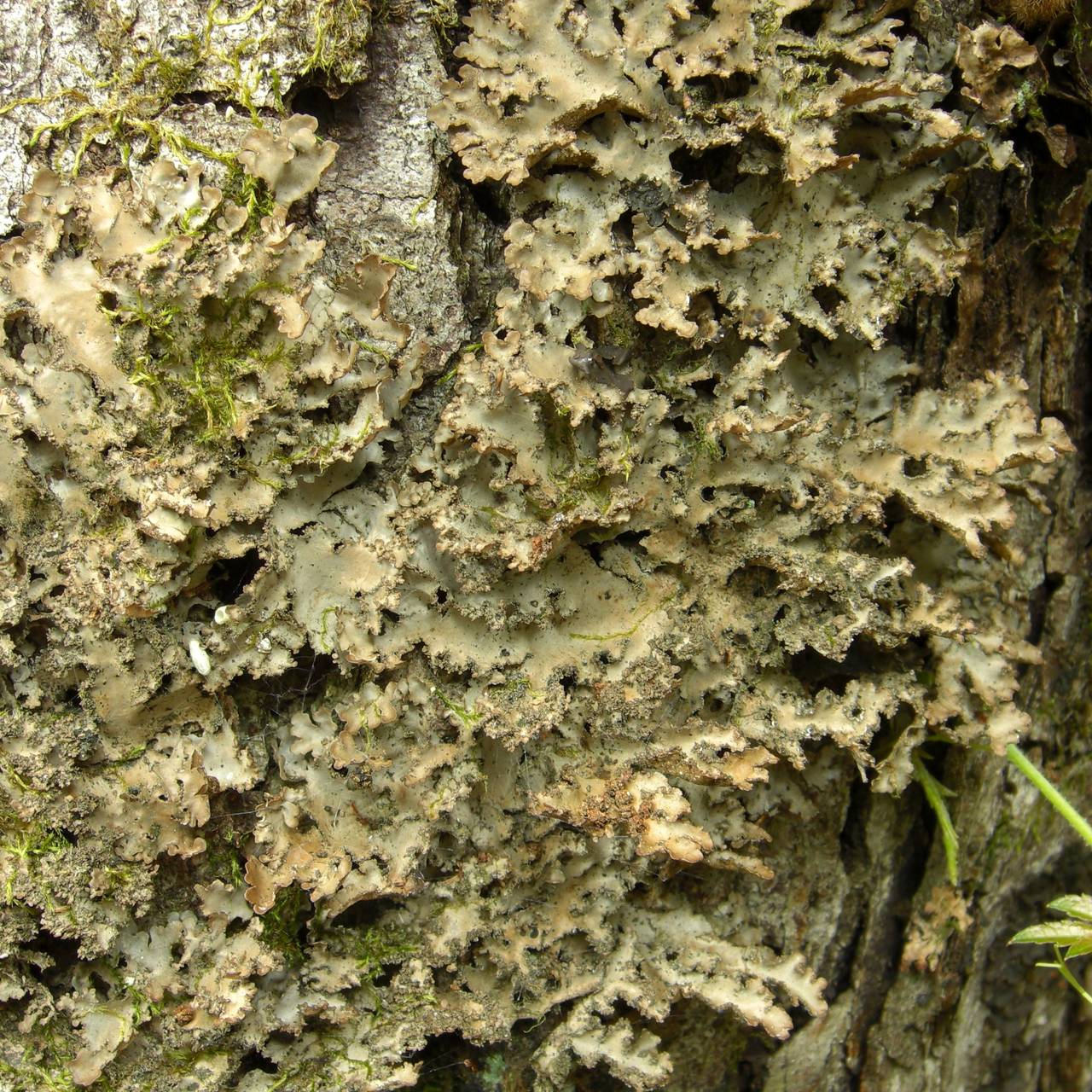

Scientific classification
- Domain: Eukaryota
- Kingdom: Fungi
- Division: Ascomycota
- Class: Lecanoromycetes
- Order: Peltigerales
- Family: Peltigeraceae
- Genus: Pseudocyphellaria
- Species: P. argyracea

Binomial name
- Pseudocyphellaria argyracea (Delise) Vain. (1898)

Synonyms
- Lichen argyraceus Bory (1822); Pseudocyphellaria argyracea var. sorediifera (Delise) Malme (1899); Sticta argyracea Delise (1822); Sticta argyracea var. sorediifera Delise (1825); Stictina argyracea (Delise) Nyl. (1860); Stictina argyracea f. sorediifera (Delise) Stizenb. (1895); Stictina argyracea var. sorediifera (Delise) Stizenb. (1890)

= Pseudocyphellaria argyracea =

Species of lichen

Pseudocyphellaria argyracea is a species of foliose lichen in the family Peltigeraceae. It was first scientifically described in 1822 by Dominique François Delise. Edvard Vainio transferred it to the genus Pseudocyphellaria in 1898.

== Description ==
Pseudocyphellaria argyracea has a foliose thallus that ranges from rosette-forming to irregularly spreading. Its upper surface features laminal white soralia and pseudocyphellae, while the pseudocyphellae and lobe margins bear simple to coralloid isidia.

== Habitat and distribution ==
From East Africa to India, Japan, New Zealand, South America, and the Pacific islands, Pseudocyphellaria argyracea has a broad distribution in the Palaeotropics.
