= Pseudocyphellaria brattii =

Scientific classification
- Domain: Eukaryota
- Kingdom: Fungi
- Division: Ascomycota
- Class: Lecanoromycetes
- Order: Peltigerales
- Family: Peltigeraceae
- Genus: Pseudocyphellaria
- Species: P. brattii

Binomial name
- Pseudocyphellaria brattii D.J.Galloway & Kantvilas (1997)

Species of lichen

Pseudocyphellaria brattii is a species of foliose lichen in the family Peltigeraceae. It was described as new to science in 1997 by lichenologists David John Galloway and Gintaras Kantvilas. The type specimen was collected along Mt. Dundas Track (Tasmania), where it was found growing on dead wood in a rainforest at an altitude of 700 m (2,300 ft). The specific epithet honours Tasmanian lichenologist Geoffrey Charles Bratt, who, according to the authors, "helped to keep Australian lichenology alive during the 'lean years'".

The lichen is endemic to Tasmania, where it is uncommon. It typically grows in deep shade on logs, or on plants.
