= Postage stamps and postal history of the French Southern and Antarctic Territories =

A 1956 50c stamp from the French Southern and Antarctic Territories showing rockhopper penguins

The French Southern and Antarctic Territories (French: Terres australes et antarctiques françaises, abbreviated TAAF) is a French overseas territory consisting of Adélie Land in coastal Antarctica and several islands in the southern Indian Ocean: the Crozet Islands, the Kerguelen Islands, Amsterdam Island and Île Saint-Paul. The territory was created on 6 August 1955, before which all were dependencies of Madagascar.

== Early postal history ==
From 1906 to 1926, stamps of France were used in the Kerguelen Islands, cancelled by the Resident's cachet. Letters from there are known to have been routed via Madagascar, Cape Town and Durban in South Africa, and Bunbury, Australia.

== First stamps ==
The TAAF used stamps of Madagascar from 1948 to 1955. On 26 October 1948, to commemorate the discovery of Adélie Land in 1840 by Jules Dumont d'Urville and publicize French claims to the region, a 100 franc Madagascar airmail stamp was overprinted TERRE ADÉLIE DUMONT D'URVILLE. On 6 August 1955, owing to Madagascar's imminent independence, the TAAF was organized as a separate entity. Its first stamp, a 15 franc stamp of Madagascar overprinted TERRES AUSTRALES ET ANTARCTIQUES FRANÇAISES, was released on 28 October 1955 and the first non-overprinted stamps were released on 25 April 1956. These consisted of a set of six regular issues in denominations from 50 centimes to 15 francs which depicted indigenous wildlife and scenery and two airmail stamps in denominations of 50 and 100 francs which depicted emperor penguins.

A 1990 stamp from the French Southern and Antarctic Territories showing Jules Dumont d'Urville

== Current status ==
The TAAF was administered from France until 2004. Since then it has been administered from the Indian Ocean island of Réunion, a French overseas department. Since achieving the territorial status it has issued a number of stamps, many of which depict wildlife of the southern oceans and Antarctica or honour polar explorers and researchers.
