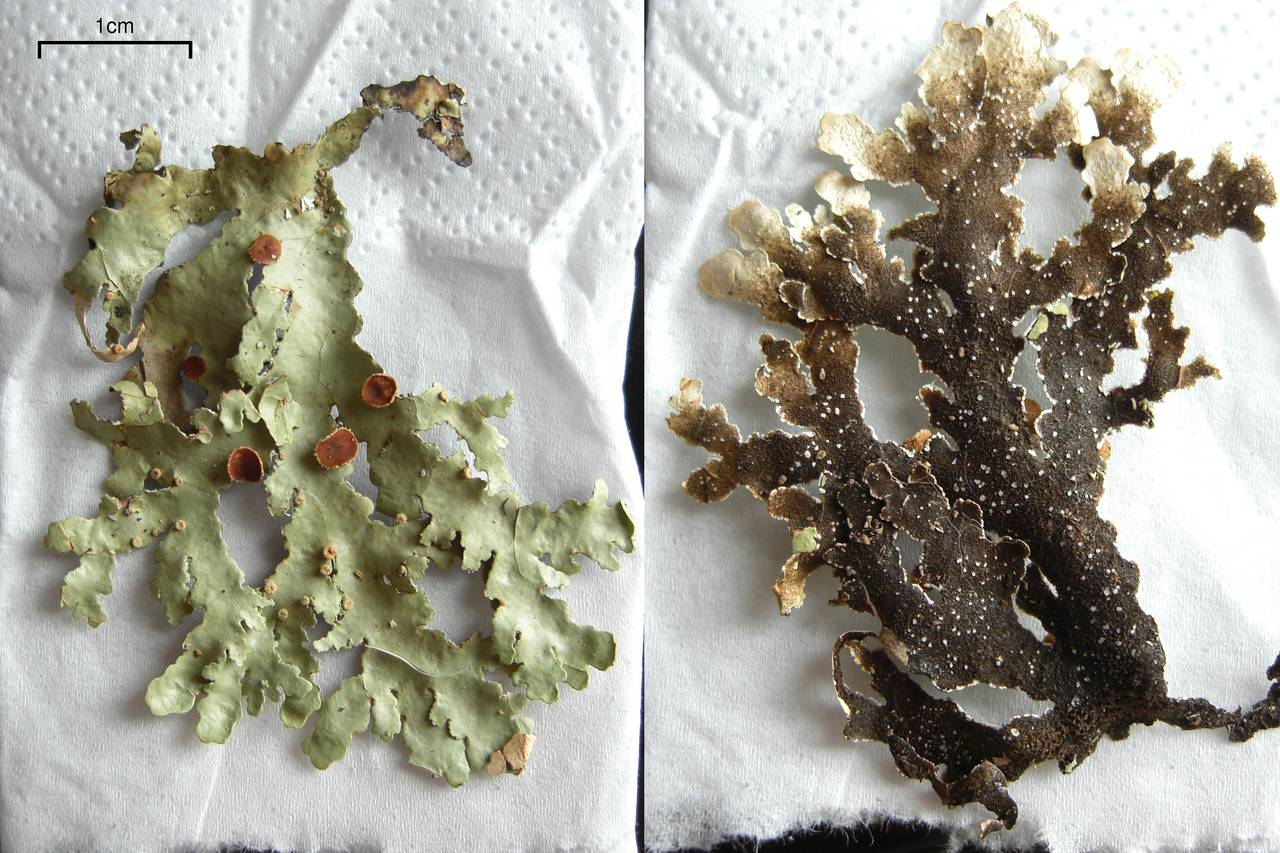
- upper- (left) and underside (right) of the foliose thallus

Scientific classification
- Domain: Eukaryota
- Kingdom: Fungi
- Division: Ascomycota
- Class: Lecanoromycetes
- Order: Peltigerales
- Family: Peltigeraceae
- Genus: Pseudocyphellaria
- Species: P. glabra

Binomial name
- Pseudocyphellaria glabra (Hook.f. & Taylor) C.W.Dodge (1948)

Synonyms
- List: Sticta glabra Hook.f. & Taylor (1844) (basionym); Celidium dubium Linds. (1867); Delisea pseudosticta Fée (1825); Homostegia dubia (Linds.) Cooke (1885); Imbricaria borreri var. coralloidea (Müll.Arg.) Jatta (1902); Lobaria freycinetii (Delise) Trevis. (1869); Lobaria freycinetii var. tenuis (Müll.Arg.) Hellb. (1896); Lobaria fulvocinerea (Mont.) Trevis. (1869); Parmelia borreri var. coralloidea Müll.Arg. (1887); Parmelia isabellina Kremp. (1881); Phanosticta freycinetii (Delise) Clem. (1909); Plectocarpon pseudosticta (Fée) Fée (1837); Pseudocyphellaria delisea (Delise) D.J.Galloway & P.James (1980); Pseudocyphellaria freycinetii (Delise) Malme (1899); Sticta delisea Delise (1825); Sticta freycinetii Delise (1822); Sticta fulvocinerea Mont. (1845)

= Pseudocyphellaria glabra =

Species of lichen

Pseudocyphellaria glabra is a species of corticolous (bark-dwelling), foliose lichen in the family Peltigeraceae. It has a pale-green upper thallus surface, a white medulla and white pseudocyphellae (tiny pores for gas exchange).

== Distribution ==
Pseudocyphellaria glabra has a disjunct distribution that is separated by the Tasman Sea and the Pacific Ocean. The lichen is found in southeastern Australia (including Tasmania), New Zealand, Argentina, Chile, Lord Howe Island, Macquarie Island, and the subantarctic islands of New Zealand. Population genomic analyses suggest that lichens from these different locations are genetically distinct, but regular long-distance dispersal of spores during the Quaternary probably prevented the local populations from evolving into distinct species.

== Taxonomy ==
The lichen was first formally described in 1844 by Joseph Dalton Hooker and Thomas Taylor as a member of the genus Sticta. Their original report recorded occurrences from the Auckland Islands, Campbell Islands, Falkland Islands, Cape Horn, and Van Diemen's Land (modern-day Tasmania). Carroll William Dodge transferred the taxon to the genus Pseudocyphellaria in 1948. It has acquired many synonyms in its taxonomic history.

== Ecology ==
Arthonia pseudocyphellariae is a lichenicolous fungus that has been recorded parasitising Pseudocyphellaria glabra. The fungus, first recorded from specimens collected in New Zealand, causes patches that are bordered by a necrotic zone measuring 1.5–8.5 mm (0.06–0.33 in) in diameter, and usually located on the margins of the host thallus.
