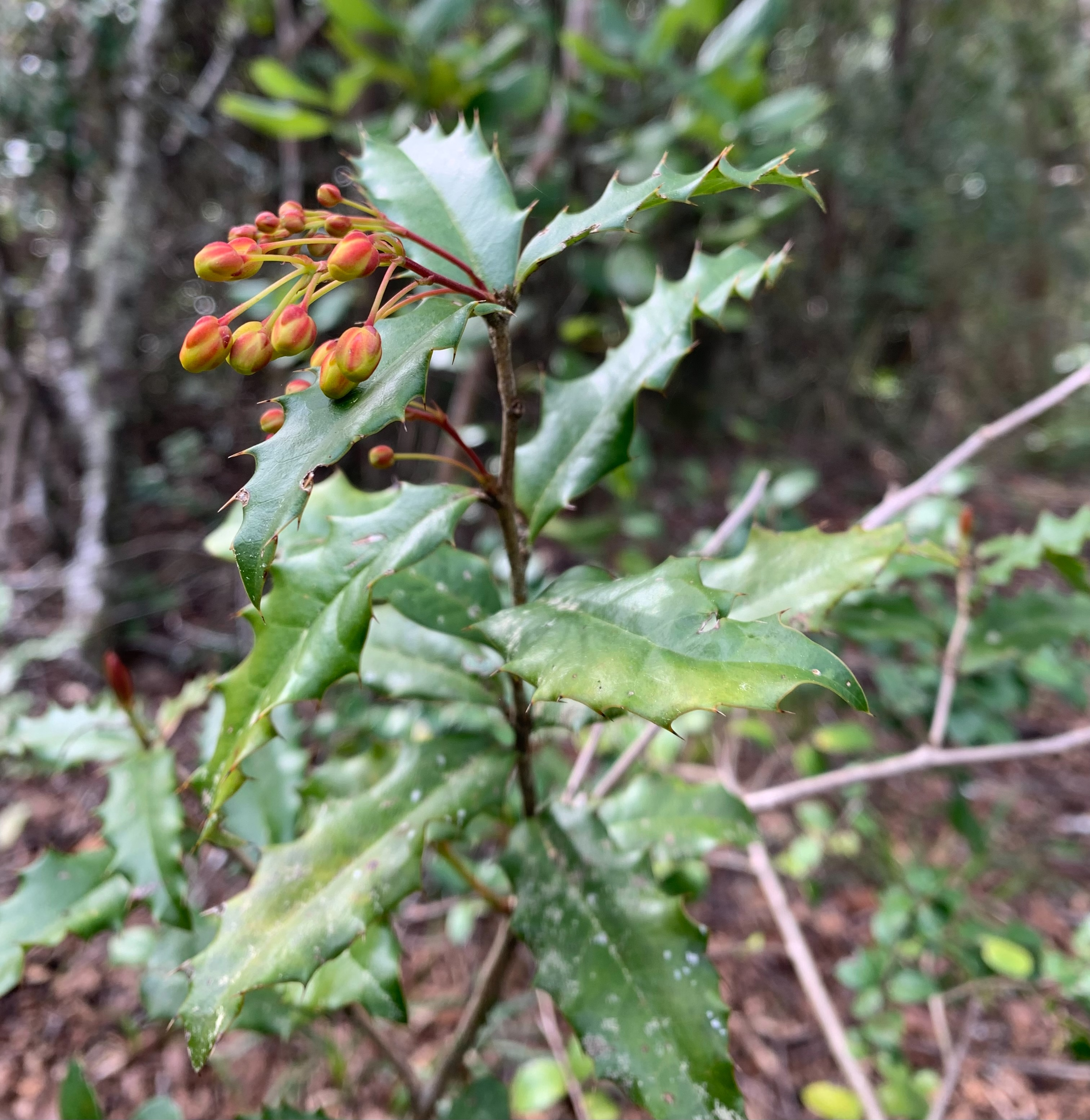

Scientific classification
- Kingdom: Plantae
- Clade: Tracheophytes
- Clade: Angiosperms
- Clade: Eudicots
- Order: Ranunculales
- Family: Berberidaceae
- Genus: Berberis
- Species: B. negeriana

Binomial name
- Berberis negeriana Tischler

= Berberis negeriana =

Species of plant

Berberis negeriana is a species of flowering plant in the family Berberidaceae. It is endemic to an extremely small area in coastal range of Bio-Bio Region in Chile. Common name include Neger's barberry and (Chilean Spanish) michay de Neger.

It is an evergreen thorny shrub growing to 2 to 3 m (6 ft 7 in to 9 ft 10 in) tall. Its flowers are yellow. It is considered a threatened woody shrub and only two natural populations are known, near Concepción, Chile.
