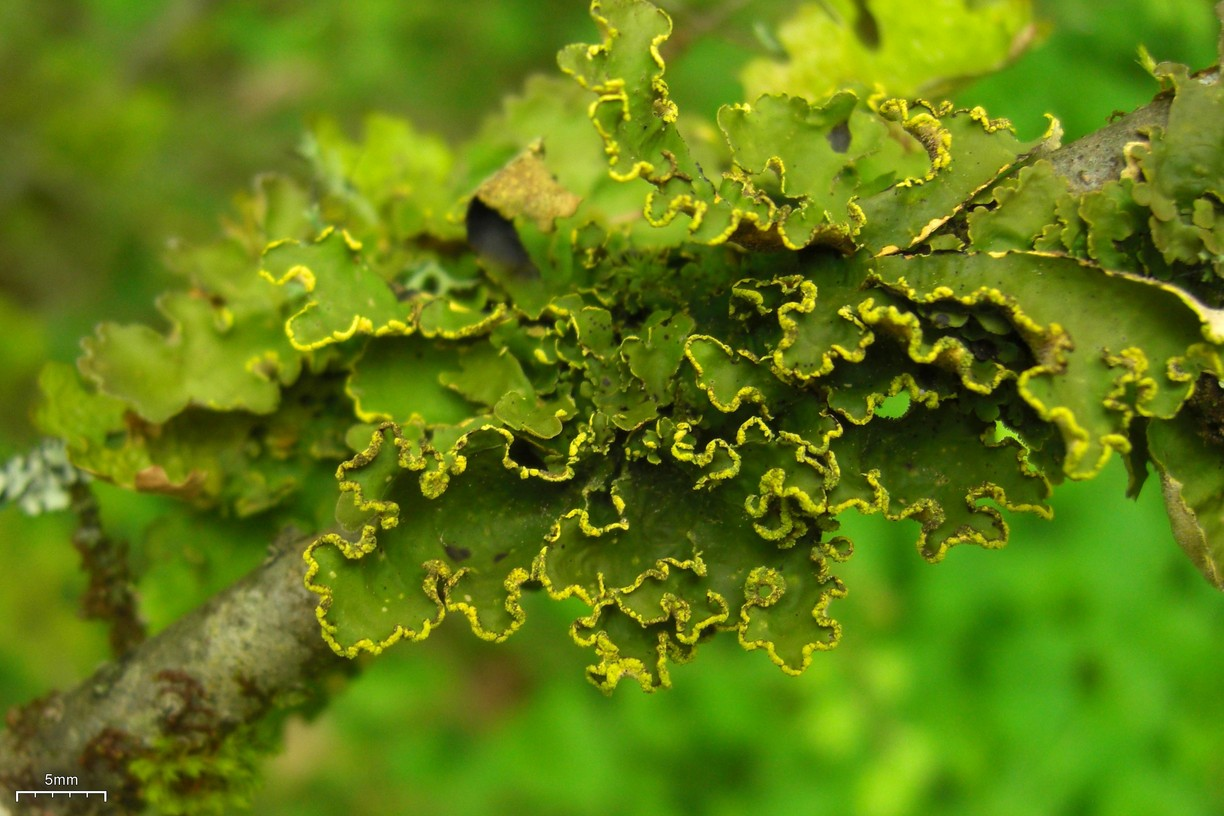
- Crocodia aurata

Scientific classification
- Domain: Eukaryota
- Kingdom: Fungi
- Division: Ascomycota
- Class: Lecanoromycetes
- Order: Peltigerales
- Family: Peltigeraceae
- Genus: Crocodia; Link (1833)

Type species
- Crocodia aurata (Ach.) Link (1833)

= Crocodia =

Genus of fungi

Crocodia is a genus of foliose lichens in the family Peltigeraceae. It has eight species. The genus has a cosmopolitan distribution, although most species occur in temperate and tropical regions of the Southern Hemisphere. The main characteristics of the genus that separate it from its parent genus, Pseudocyphellaria, include a yellow medulla and yellow pseudocyphellae (tiny pores for gas exchange) on the lower thallus surface.

== Taxonomy ==
Crocodia was originally proposed by German naturalist Johann Heinrich Friedrich Link in 1833, with Crocodia aurata assigned as the type species. A 2013 molecular phylogenetics-based analysis of the Lobariaceae showed that the large genus Pseudocyphellaria was polyphyletic. In 2011, Jørgensen and Galloway had proposed to split Pseudocyphellaria into two genera, with the large clade containing the type species P. crocata to retain the original genus name. The genus name Crocodia was reinstated by Moncada and colleagues for the smaller P. aurata clade (containing P. aurata and P. clathrata). Additional species were transferred to the genus soon after.

== Description ==
Characteristics of the genus include a foliose (leafy) thallus, yellow medulla, and yellow pseudocyphellae on the lower thallus surface. The form of the thallus ranges from neat rosettes to irregularly spreading. The photobiont partner is green algae (possibly from the genus Dictyochloropsis), while cyanobacteria occur in internal cephalodia. The apothecia are pedicellate and usually pubescent or verrucose. The sexual spores (ascospores) are fusiform (spindle-shaped) to ellipsoid, brown, and usually have three septa; the asexual spores (conidia) are colourless with a bacilliform shape. Compounds called triterpenoids are the usual lichen products found in the genus; they include derivatives of fernene and lupane, which are examples of hopane triterpenoids.

== Species interactions ==
Capronia harrisiana is a lichenicolous fungus that has been recorded growing on Crocodia aurata in southeastern North America. Other lichenicolous fungi growing on members of Crocodia include Homostegia pelvetii, Abrothallus parmeliarum, Arthonia epiphyscia, A. fuscorubella, A. pelveti, A. stictaria, Lichenoconium plectocarpoides, Nectria heterospora and Scutula epiblastemica.

== Habitat and distribution ==
Crocodia lichens are generally found in oceanic habitats that are humid and sheltered. Collectively, the genus has a cosmopolitan distribution, with the greatest diversity in the Southern Hemisphere.

== Species ==
- Crocodia arvidssonii (D.J.Galloway) D.J.Galloway & Elix (2014) – South America; Canary Islands
- Crocodia aurata (Ach.) Link (1833) – widespread
- Crocodia asticta (Nyl.) Trevis. (1869)
- Crocodia aurora (De Not.) Trevis. (1869)
- Crocodia fossulata (Dufour) Trevis. (1869)
- Crocodia guilleminii (Mont.) Nyl. (1890)
- Crocodia poculifera (Müll. Arg.) D.J.Galloway & Elix (2014) – palaeotropics
- Crocodia punctulata (Nyl.) Trevis. (1869)
