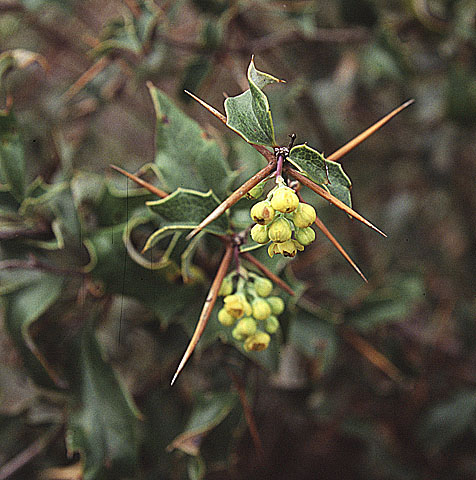

Scientific classification
- Kingdom: Plantae
- Clade: Tracheophytes
- Clade: Angiosperms
- Clade: Eudicots
- Order: Ranunculales
- Family: Berberidaceae
- Genus: Berberis
- Species: B. chilensis

Binomial name
- Berberis chilensis Gillet

Varieties
- Berberis chilensis var. brachybotria (Gay) Landrum; Berberis chilensis var. chilensis

= Berberis chilensis =

Species of flowering plant

Berberis chilensis is a species of flowering plant endemic to Chile, where it is distributed between the Coquimbo and Araucanía regions.

It has two varieties:

- Berberis chilensis var. brachybotria (Gay) Landrum
- Berberis chilensis var. chilensis
