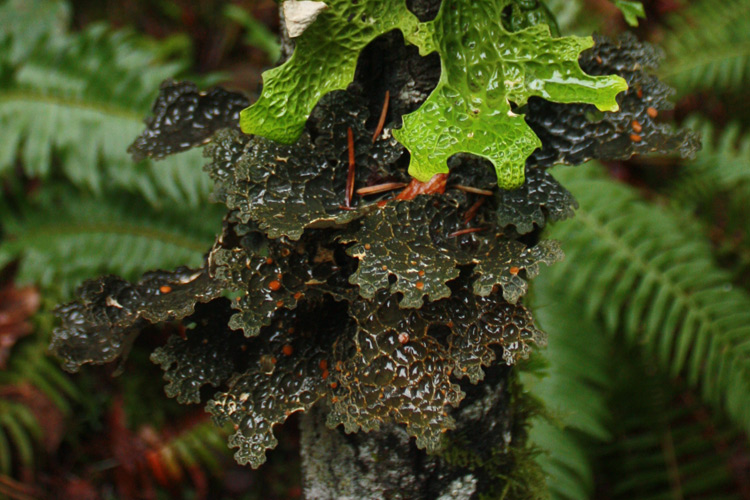
- Pseudocyphellaria anthraspis on Vancouver Island, Canada

Scientific classification
- Kingdom: Fungi
- Division: Ascomycota
- Class: Lecanoromycetes
- Order: Peltigerales
- Family: Peltigeraceae
- Genus: Pseudocyphellaria; Vain. (1890)

Type species
- Pseudocyphellaria crocata (L.) Vain. (1898)

Species
- See text

= Pseudocyphellaria =

Genus of lichens

Pseudocyphellaria is a genus of large, leafy lichens that are sometimes referred to as "specklebelly" lichens. The genus has a widespread distribution, especially in south temperate regions, and contains about 170 species. They resemble Lobaria, except that most species of Pseudocyphellaria have conspicuous pseudocyphellae on their lower surface, a characteristic that was once considered unique to this genus. Some species contain pulvinic acid-related pigments; in these species the soredia and pseudocyphellae can be bright yellow.

== Taxonomy ==
Pseudocyphellaria was originally circumscribed in 1890 by Finnish lichenologist Edvard August Vainio, with P. aurata as the type species. In the 2010s, molecular phylogenetic analyses showed that this species, along with a few others, nested within a small clade separate from most Pseudocyphellaria. These species, characterised by a yellow medulla containing pulvinic acid derivatives and fernene triterpenoids, were placed in a resurrected genus, Crocodia, while Pseudocyphellaria was proposed for conservation with a new type species, P. crocata. This proposal was later accepted by the Nomenclature Committee for Fungi.

== The Pseudocyphellaria symbiosis ==
Many species of Pseudocyphellaria are cyanolichens and contain the cyanobacterium Nostoc as a photobiont, which allows nitrogen fixation. In some species of Pseudocyphellaria the cyanobacterium is the sole photobiont, while other species also contain the green alga Dictyochloropsis and restrict the cyanobacterium to warty cephalodia on the lower surface of the lichen.

Some species of Pseudocyphellaria appear to be able to use either a cyanobacterium or a green algae as their photobiont. DNA tests have shown that the fungal symbionts in P. murrayi (which is in a symbiosis with a cyanobacterium) and P. rufovirescens (which is in a symbiosis with a green alga) are actually the same species. This means that P. murrayi-P. rufovirescens is actually one species of fungus that is capable of forming two very different lichens, one with a cyanobacterium and one with a green alga. Two other possible pairs of Pseudocyphellaria species that may be capable of choosing their photobiont are P. knightii-P. lividofusca, and P. kookeri-P. durietzii.

== Ecological significance ==
Most Pseudocyphellaria grow on trees in coastal areas, from the subtropics to the boreal zones, although some species can occasionally be found growing on mossy rocks or growing inland. Many species of Pseudocyphellaria are restricted to old-growth forests in humid areas, and are therefore threatened by logging. The limited light conditions of dense young forests can severely decrease the growth of Pseudocyphellaria crocata compared to more open, old-growth forests, and the excess of light from clearcuts can also cause damage to the lichen. Because they are often restricted to humid forests in undisturbed areas, species of Pseudocyphellaria are often used as indicators of valuable old growth forests.

Pseudocyphellaria rainierensis is listed as vulnerable in Canada by COSEWIC. Pseudocyphellaria crocata has disappeared from much of Scandinavia, a development that has been partly attributed to an increase in grazing from snails, presumably as a result of global warming. In the areas of Scandinavia where P. crocata is still found, it seems restricted to growing on smaller twigs that are harder for the snails to reach.

== Species ==
- Pseudocyphellaria allanii D.J.Galloway (1982) – New Zealand
- Pseudocyphellaria argyracea (Delise) Vain. (1898)
- Pseudocyphellaria bartlettii D.J.Galloway (1985)
- Pseudocyphellaria berteroana (Mont.) Redón (1977)
- Pseudocyphellaria biliana Moncada, Reidy & Lücking (2014)
- Pseudocyphellaria billardierei (Delise) Räsänen (1932)
- Pseudocyphellaria brattii D.J.Galloway & Kantvilas (1997)
- Pseudocyphellaria carpoloma (Delise) Vain. (1898)
- Pseudocyphellaria chloroleuca (Hook.f. & Taylor) Du Rietz (1924)
- Pseudocyphellaria citrina (Gyeln.) Lücking, Moncada & S.Stenroos (2017)
- Pseudocyphellaria clathrata (De Not.) Malme (1935)
- Pseudocyphellaria confusa Moncada, Reidy & Lücking (2014)
- Pseudocyphellaria crocata (L.) Vain. (1898)
- Pseudocyphellaria crocatoides D.J.Galloway (1993)
- Pseudocyphellaria dasyphyllidia Bjerke (2003)
- Pseudocyphellaria desfontainii (Delise) Vain. (1903)
- Pseudocyphellaria deyi Lücking (2017)
- Pseudocyphellaria dissimilis (Nyl.) D.J.Galloway & P.James (1980)
- Pseudocyphellaria dozyana (Mont. & Bosch) D.J.Galloway (1985)
- Pseudocyphellaria epiflavoides (Gyeln.) Lücking, Farkas & Lőkös (2017)
- Pseudocyphellaria faveolata (Delise) Malme (1899)
- Pseudocyphellaria gallowayana Moncada, Reidy & Lücking (2014)
- Pseudocyphellaria gilva (Ach.) Malme (1899)
- Pseudocyphellaria glabra (Hook.f. & Taylor) C.W.Dodge (1948)
- Pseudocyphellaria glaucescens (Kremp.) Imshaug (1977)
- Pseudocyphellaria granulata (C.Bab.) Malme (1899)
- Pseudocyphellaria haywardiorum D.J.Galloway (1898)
- Pseudocyphellaria hirsuta (Mont.) Malme (1899)
- Pseudocyphellaria holarctica McCune, Lücking & Moncada (2017)
- Pseudocyphellaria insculpta (Stizenb.) D.J.Galloway (1985)
- Pseudocyphellaria intricata (Delise) Vain. (1898)
- Pseudocyphellaria lacerata Degel. (1941)
- Pseudocyphellaria longiloba Moncada, Reidy & Lücking (2014)
- Pseudocyphellaria louwhoffiae J.A.Elix (2018)
- Pseudocyphellaria macroisidiata Moncada, Reidy & Lücking (2014)
- Pseudocyphellaria mallota (Tuck.) H.Magn. (1940)
- Pseudocyphellaria mooreana (Zahlbr.) Imshaug (1977)
- Pseudocyphellaria multifida (Laurer) D.J.Galloway & P.James (1980)
- Pseudocyphellaria neglecta (Müll.Arg.) H.Magn. (1940)
- Pseudocyphellaria nitida (Taylor) Malme (1899)
- Pseudocyphellaria norvegica (Gyeln.) P.James (1979)
- Pseudocyphellaria patagonica (Müll.Arg.) I.M.Lamb (1959)
- Pseudocyphellaria perpetua McCune & Miądl. (2002)
- Pseudocyphellaria philipiana Moncada, Reidy & Lücking (2014)
- Pseudocyphellaria pomaikaiana Moncada, Reidy & Lücking (2014)
- Pseudocyphellaria prolificans (Nyl.) Vain. (1913)
- Pseudocyphellaria punctata Lücking & Moncada (2017)
- Pseudocyphellaria punctillaris (Müll.Arg.) D.J.Galloway (1993)
- Pseudocyphellaria rigida (Müll.Arg.) D.J.Galloway (1985)
- Pseudocyphellaria rubella (Hook.f. & Taylor) D.J.Galloway & P.James (1980)
- Pseudocyphellaria rubrina (Stirt.) D.J.Galloway (1985)
- Pseudocyphellaria rufovirescens (C.Bab.) D.J.Galloway (1982)
- Pseudocyphellaria sandwicensis (Zahlbr.) Moncada & Lücking (2017)
- Pseudocyphellaria sayeri D.J.Galloway (1997)
- Pseudocyphellaria semilanata (Müll.Arg.) D.J.Galloway (1985)
- Pseudocyphellaria sericeofulva D.J.Galloway (1983)
- Pseudocyphellaria soredioglabra Kantvilas & Elix (2000)
- Pseudocyphellaria stenophylla (Müll. Arg.) D.J.Galloway (1985)
- Pseudocyphellaria sulphurea (Schaer.) D.J.Galloway (1985)
- Pseudocyphellaria xanthosticta (Pers.) Moncada & Lücking (2015)

== Traditional use ==
Several species of Pseudocyphellaria can be utilized to produce a brown to orange-brown dye, and some of them have been used to dye wool in Britain and Scandinavia. One species of Pseudocyphellaria is used in Madagascar to make a tea used to treat indigestion.

Besides being yellow, pulvinic acid derivatives are highly toxic. Any species of Pseudocyphellaria that has yellow structures probably contains one of these compounds, and may be toxic if ingested.

== Gallery ==
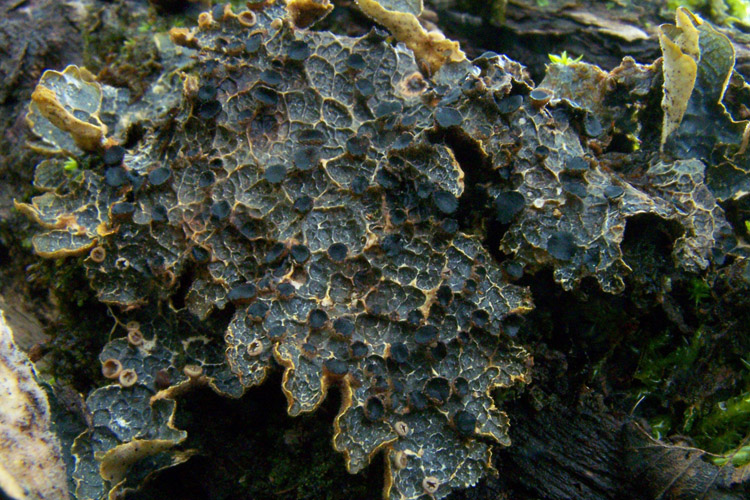
Pseudocyphellaria corifolia growing in Parque Etnobotanico Omora on Isla Navarino, Chile. This species has brown soralia and black apothecia.

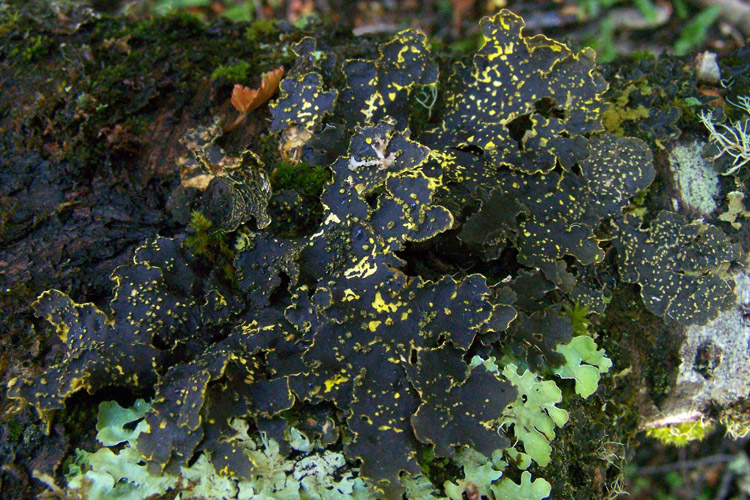
Pseudocyphellaria granulata growing in Parque Etnobotanico Omora on Isla Navarino, Chile. This species has brilliant yellow soralia.

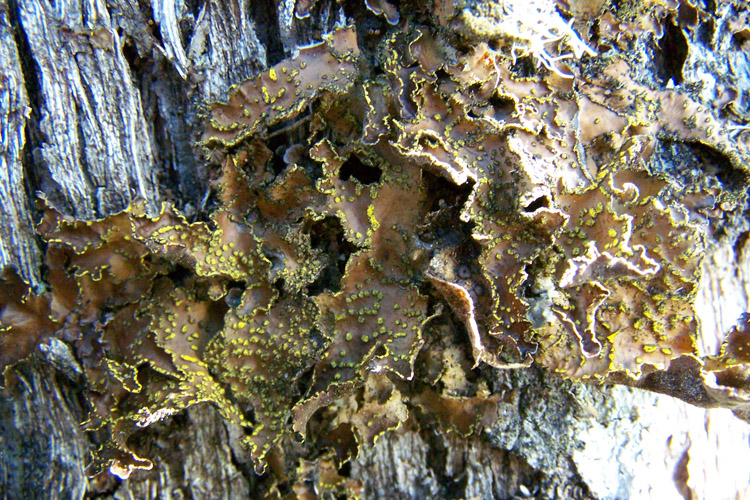
A species of Pseudocyphellaria growing in the Patagonian Andes near Bariloche, Argentina. This species has brilliant yellow soralia.

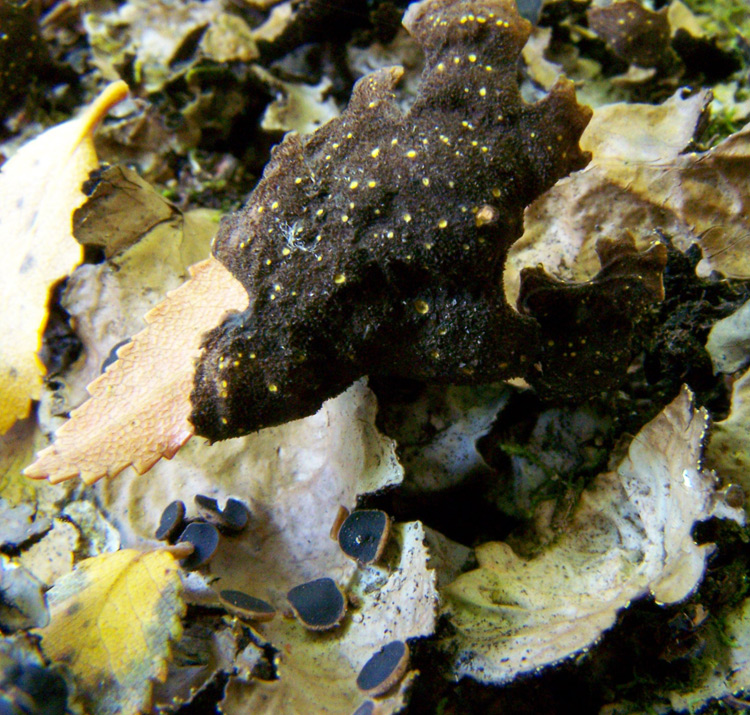
Yellow pseudocyphellea on the underside of a species of Pseudocyphellaria growing near Bariloche, Argentina.
