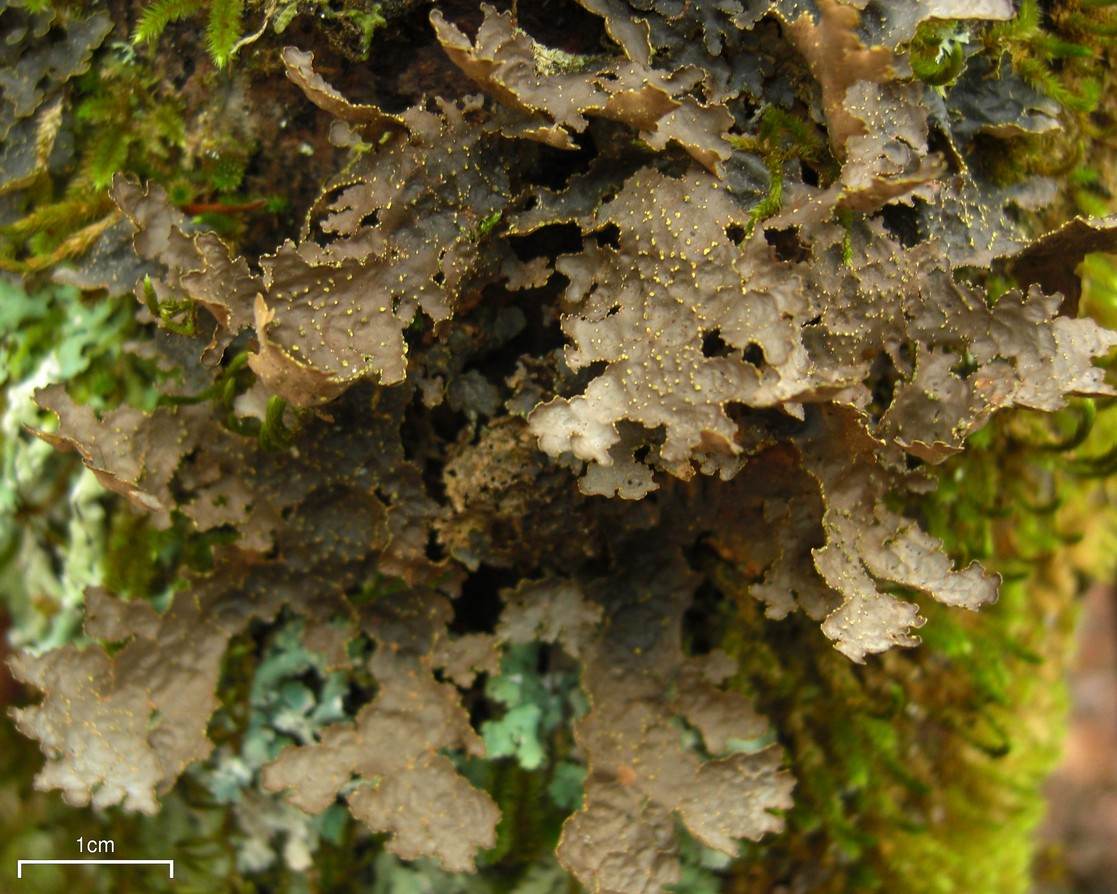
- Pseudocyphellaria crocata

Conservation status
- Apparently Secure (NatureServe)

Scientific classification
- Kingdom: Fungi
- Division: Ascomycota
- Class: Lecanoromycetes
- Order: Peltigerales
- Family: Peltigeraceae
- Genus: Pseudocyphellaria
- Species: P. crocata

Binomial name
- Pseudocyphellaria crocata (L.) Vain. (1898)

Synonyms
- Lichen crocatus L. (1771)

= Pseudocyphellaria crocata =

Species of lichen in the family Lobariaceae

Pseudocyphellaria crocata is a species of lichen in the family Peltigeraceae, belonging to the ascomycetes.

Its predators include the land snail Notodiscus hookeri.

In Iceland, it has been recorded in only two locations and is classified as critically endangered (CR).

== See also ==
- List of lichens named by Carl Linnaeus
