= Orceolina =

Scientific classification
- Kingdom: Fungi
- Division: Ascomycota
- Class: Lecanoromycetes
- Order: Baeomycetales
- Family: Trapeliaceae
- Genus: Orceolina; Hertel (1970)

Type species
- Orceolina kerguelensis (Tuck.) Hertel (1970)

Species
- O. antarctica O. kerguelensis

Synonyms
- Urceolina Tuck. (1875)

Genus of lichens

Orceolina is a small genus of lichen-forming fungi in the family Trapeliaceae. Established in 1970 as a replacement name for an earlier genus that was already used for flowering plants, Orceolina comprises just two species that form orange to deep red crusty patches on sun-exposed rocks. These lichens are found exclusively on the windswept subantarctic islands of the southern Indian Ocean, where they grow from sea level to alpine ridges on basaltic and granitic surfaces.

== Taxonomy ==
The genus Orceolina was erected by Hannes Hertel in 1970 as a replacement name for Edward Tuckerman's 1875 Urceolina, which was pre-occupied by a flowering-plant genus. Tuckerman's original taxon, U. kerguelensis, thus became Orceolina kerguelensis. For decades the lichen had been shuffled among Lecanora and Placodium until Hertel's action clarified its status as a distinct lineage. Modern checklists place Orceolina in the family Trapeliaceae.

Only two species are currently accepted: O. kerguelensis and O. antarctica. Early molecular phylogenetics analysis showed that they form a tight clade that is sister to the southern-hemisphere placodioid genus Placopsis, and together those two genera are sister to Trapelia. The evolutionary relationships indicate that the genus' simplified spore-bearing structure evolved by becoming reduced from a Trapelia-type ancestor rather than being an original primitive feature. The species Ducatina umbilicata, described from the Crozet and Kerguelen Islands, is closely related to Orceolina; it is differentiated by its morphology (it has a large umbilicate thallus) and lack of secondary metabolites.

== Description ==
Orceolina species are rock-dwelling (saxicolous) crustose lichens whose thalli spread as irregular orange to deep red patches. The surface is variously cracked into wart-like or lobed units, a pattern termed verrucose-areolate or effigurate. Each patch is dominated by a thick outer skin (cortex) composed of densely packed fungal threads (hyphae) standing perpendicular to the surface; in O. kerguelensis the cortex may exceed 1 mm in the centre.

Green algal partners (a Coccomyxa-like photobiont) occupy a layer beneath the cortex, but conspicuous vertical columns of algal cells periodically pierce the cortex almost to the surface. This three-dimensional arrangement helps the symbiosis photosynthesise through the massive wall. The inner body (medulla) is thin and often blends with grains of the underlying basalt or granite. No secondary metabolites have been detected by thin-layer chromatography.

Reproduction is by plentiful urn-shaped (urceolate) apothecia deeply embedded in the thallus. Each fruiting cup contains asci that lack the dome-like amyloid cushions seen in many relatives; nevertheless the ascus wall stains pale blue in iodine, indicating a weakened amyloid reaction. Eight colourless, single-celled spores (ascospores) measuring roughly 22–29 × 16–19 μm are produced. Immersed pycnidia yield long, curved asexual spores (conidia) about 15–25 μm in length.

== Habitat and distribution ==
As a genus Orceolina is confined to the wind-lashed subantarctic islands of the southern Indian Ocean. Both species colonise exposed, vegetation-free basaltic or granitic rocks and pebbles from near sea level to the higher alpine ridges (up to roughly 650 m). Confirmed records come from the Kerguelen Islands, Crozet Islands, Marion and Prince Edward Islands, and Heard Island. O. kerguelensis tends to be more common on drier, west-facing slopes, whereas O. antarctica often occupies slightly moister ridges, but the two can co-occur. No populations are known outside this isolated subantarctic archipelago belt, making Orceolina an example of high-latitude island endemism.

== Species ==
- Orceolina antarctica (Müll.Arg.) R.S.Poulsen & Søchting 2001)
- Orceolina kerguelensis (Tuck.) Hertel 1970)
