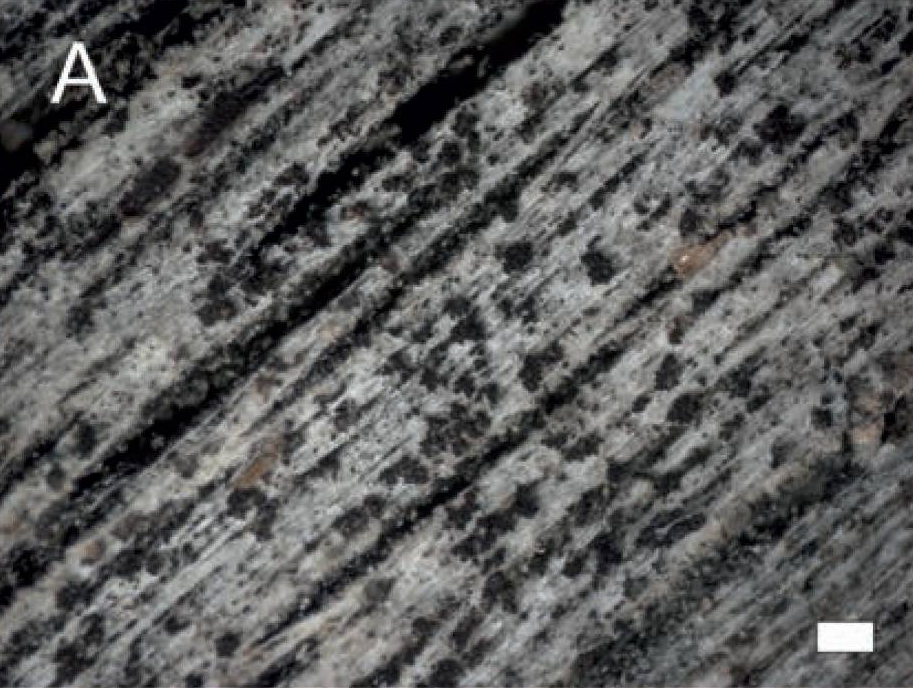
- Holotype of Xyloelixia septentrionalis; scale bar: 0.5 mm

Scientific classification
- Kingdom: Fungi
- Division: Ascomycota
- Class: Lecanoromycetes
- Order: Baeomycetales
- Family: Xylographaceae
- Genus: Xyloelixia; S.Y.Kondr. (2022)

Type species
- Xyloelixia isidiosa (Elix) S.Y.Kondr. (2022)

Species
- X. constricta X. disseminata X. isidiosa X. septentrionalis

= Xyloelixia =

Genus of lichen-forming fungi

Xyloelixia is a genus of lichen-forming fungi in the family Xylographaceae. It comprises four species. The genus was established in 2022 to accommodate wood-dwelling species that were previously classified in Xylographa but form a distinct evolutionary lineage based on DNA analysis. Species are characterised by thalli dominated by dense clusters of granular isidia with blackened tips, and they produce confriesiic and friesiic acids as their main lichen products. The genus is known from widely scattered locations, including Australia, North America, and southern South America, but individual species appear to be rare and localised.

== Taxonomy ==
Xyloelixia was introduced in 2022 by Sergey Kondratyuk as one of several new genera segregated from traditionally broad concepts of Xylographa and related trapeliaceous lineages, based on a combined three-gene molecular phylogeny of the families Trapeliaceae and Xylographaceae. The genus corresponds to the former "Xylographa isidiosa group" and was described as forming its own, well-supported clade within the family Xylographaceae, distinct from Xylographa in the strict sense and other allied genera such as Lambiella, Rimularia, Ptychographa and Lithographa.

The type species is Xyloelixia isidiosa, originally described from Western Australia as Hypocenomyce isidiosa by John Elix, and later transferred to Xylographa on the basis of molecular data. Subsequent analyses that combined nuclear and mitochondrial markers placed "Xylographa" isidiosa together with a small set of wood-dwelling species in a separate branch, prompting Kondratyuk and co-authors to recognise Xyloelixia as a distinct genus and to propose new combinations for X. isidiosa, X. constricta, X. disseminata and X. septentrionalis. The authors note that the inclusion of X. septentrionalis, a Northern Hemisphere species, is still partly based on morphology and chemistry and should be tested further with additional sequence data.

Several visible and chemical features support this taxonomic change. In contrast to Xylographa in the strict sense, species of Xyloelixia have a well-developed thallus dominated by isidia (granular reproductive structures), fruiting bodies that tend to radiate outwards rather than forming parallel lines, long spindle-shaped spores, and a characteristic chemistry dominated by confriesiic and friesiic acids together with fatty acids. These characters, in combination with the molecular evidence, have been used to justify recognition of Xyloelixia as a separate monophyletic genus within the Xylographaceae.

== Description ==
Xyloelixia species are lignicolous (wood-dwelling) lichens with a crustose to somewhat squamulose thallus that develops on dead wood. The thallus consists of scattered granules or small squamules that are adnate to the substratum, green-brown in colour and often with a slightly scalloped (crenulate), upturned margin. These primary units rapidly produce dense, granular isidia that come to dominate the surface; the isidia are roughly spherical with conspicuously blackened tips, and they become coralloid and tightly crowded so that they form cerebriform, conglomerate clusters. Soredia are not present. The upper surface is covered by goniocysts composed of tightly packed algal cells surrounded by brown paraplectenchymatous fungal hyphae, which are readily dislodged in water mounts and give the thallus a dark-brown, granular aspect. The photobiont is a green alga of the genus Trebouxia.

The sexual structures are often scarce, but when present the ascomata first appear as narrow slits that originate as a single structure and then grow centrifugally, eventually forming rings or star-like patterns in which the surrounding wood grain is slightly raised into a low "hill" in the centre. In other cases, ascomata grow laterally, regenerating repeatedly from the edges of exhausted excipular shells and producing irregularly lobed or ellipsoid complexes that are strongly constricted at the base. The discs are concave to deeply concave and dark brown to black, with a thin brown margin; in dry conditions they may be almost concealed by thick, black, flexuose margins. The rim (exciple) is composed of interwoven fungal tissue and merges at its base with wood cells; the fungal threads (hyphae) forming the rim are brown to dark brown on the outer surface. The hypothecium is hyaline to pale reddish brown, and the hymenium is hyaline to faintly brownish and amyloid or hemiamyloid in iodine. Paraphyses are sparsely branched, about 2.5 μm thick in the middle and somewhat thickened to 3–4 μm in the apical cell, with little or no pigmentation. Asci contain eight long-ellipsoid to nearly spindle-shaped (fusiform) ascospores.

Asexual structures other than isidia include globose, partly immersed conidiomata whose walls are pigmented brown and grey; in the material examined they were empty and the conidia have not been observed. Sterile hyphae may occur as non-lichenised threads interwoven with the wood hyphae, or as lichenised hyphae associated with endosubstratal algal plugs in the wood fibres. Chemically, Xyloelixia is characterised by confriesiic acid and friesiic acid, often accompanied by one or more unidentified fatty acids as major lichen products. Standard spot tests are usually negative and the thallus shows only a faint whitish fluorescence under ultraviolet light.

== Habitat and distribution ==
Xyloelixia is strictly lignicolous and grows on dead wood, including charred timber. In Australia, the type species X. isidiosa inhabits dead, burnt logs of Eucalyptus in woodland. In North America, species assigned to the genus occur mainly on wood, particularly on members of the Cupressaceae, in temperate forests, and also on driftwood in salt marshes along the Atlantic coastal plain. They extend from lowland coastal sites to montane localities in the Appalachian Mountains. The genus has also been recorded from glacier forelands in the Cape Horn region of southern Chile, where it grows on exposed wood in subantarctic conditions.

Despite this ecological breadth, the known species are considered very rare. Xyloelixia isidiosa is only known from its type locality in Western Australia, where it can be locally common but has not been found elsewhere. X. constricta is so far restricted to Cape Horn in southern Chile, while X. disseminata is one of the few nemoral members of the broader Xylographa complex and has been recorded in eastern North America from Nova Scotia southwards to North Carolina. Xyloelixia septentrionalis, a Northern Hemisphere species with a thallus and goniocysts resembling those of X. isidiosa, is tentatively placed in the genus but still awaits confirmation by additional molecular data.

== Species ==
Four species are included in Xyloelixia:

- Xyloelixia constricta (T.Sprib.) S.Y.Kondr. (2022)
- Xyloelixia disseminata (Willey) S.Y.Kondr. (2022)
- Xyloelixia isidiosa (Elix) S.Y.Kondr. (2022)
- Xyloelixia septentrionalis (T.Sprib.) S.Y.Kondr. (2022)
