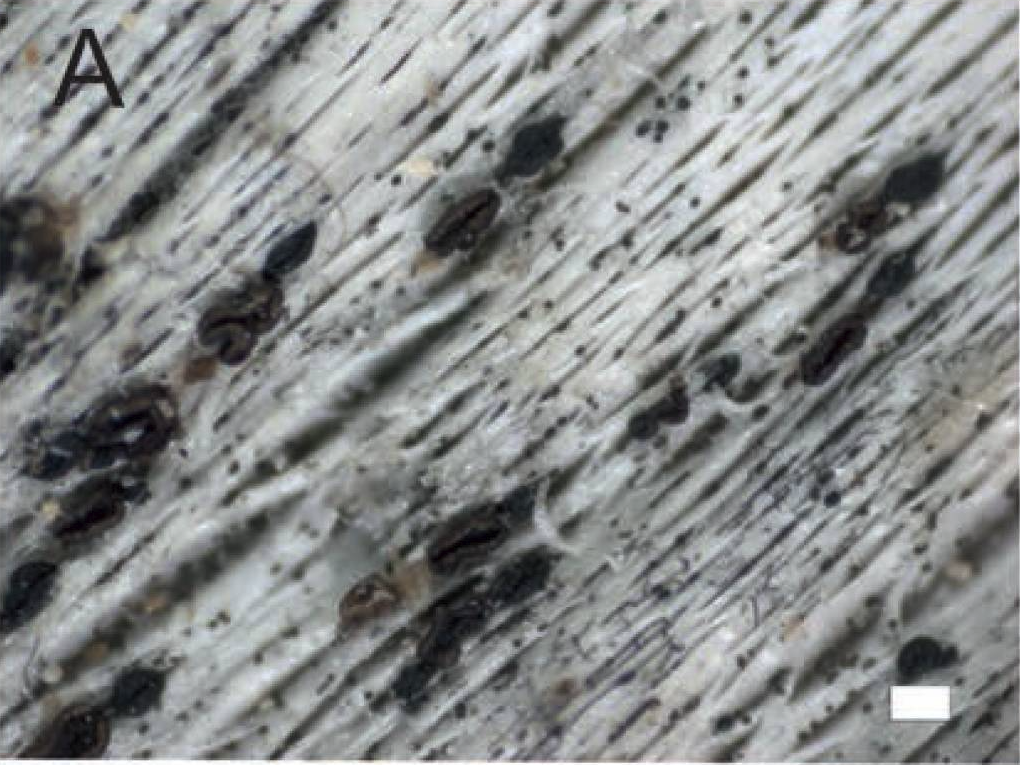
- Closeup showing the arrangement of ascomata and goniocysts on bare wood; scale: 0.2 mm

Conservation status
- Unranked (NatureServe)

Scientific classification
- Kingdom: Fungi
- Division: Ascomycota
- Class: Lecanoromycetes
- Order: Baeomycetales
- Family: Xylographaceae
- Genus: Xylographa
- Species: X. bjoerkii

Binomial name
- Xylographa bjoerkii T.Sprib. (2014)

= Xylographa bjoerkii =

Species of lichen-forming fungus

Xylographa bjoerkii is a species of lichen-forming fungus in the family Xylographaceae. It is a wood-dwelling lichen that grows on decaying logs in humid, low-elevation forests of western North America, from British Columbia south to Oregon. The species was described in 2014 and is recognised by its dark, concave fruiting bodies and reduced thallus.

== Taxonomy ==
Xylographa bjoerkii was described as a new species in 2014 by Toby Spribille as part of a molecular and morphological revision of the wood-inhabiting lichen-forming genus Xylographa. The species epithet honours Curtis Björk, who collected the original type material used to describe the species. The original description noted that it resembles Xylographa disseminata but differs in having shorter ascospores, a reduced thallus, and confriesiic acid as its main secondary metabolite.

A later multi-gene phylogenetic analysis of Trapeliaceae and Xylographaceae recovered Xylographa bjoerkii as a distinct lineage within Xylographaceae, separate from Xylographa (in the strict sense) and Xyloelixia, and noted that its placement may need further data to resolve.

== Description ==
The species forms dark, concave fruiting bodies (ascomata) with a thick, wavy (flexuose) margin. Individual ascomata are angular to oval (ellipsoid) and are typically strongly pinched at the base. Under the microscope, the outer rim (exciple) lacks crystals and has weakly birefringent cell walls, the spore-bearing layer (hymenium) is hemiamyloid (partly staining with iodine), and each ascus contains eight colourless (hyaline) ascospores that are oval and only rarely show a cross-wall (septate). Asexual fruiting structures (conidiomata) have been observed rarely; when present, they produce curved, thread-like conidia (asexual spores). The lichen's algal partner is a green, rounded alga (chlorococcoid), and small algae-containing granules (goniocysts) occur scattered between the ascomata rather than immediately next to them. Confriesiic acid is the only reported secondary metabolite in the lichen.

== Habitat, distribution, and ecology ==
The type collection was made in British Columbia, Canada, where the lichen was found growing on a log of western red cedar (Thuja plicata) in a waterfall spray zone at low elevation. Sequenced specimens reported in the same study indicate that the species is known from western North America, including Canada (British Columbia) and the United States (Alaska and Oregon).

Comparative genomic analysis found that Xylographa bjoerkii encodes a range of carbohydrate-degrading enzymes and sugar transporters, including genes associated with cellulose breakdown. Two candidate cellulase genes from the species were expressed in E. coli and were active on cellulose and beta-glucan in laboratory assays, supporting the idea that the fungus may be able to obtain some carbon from decaying wood in addition to sugars supplied by its algal partner.
