= Brianiopsis =

Scientific classification
- Kingdom: Fungi
- Division: Ascomycota
- Class: Lecanoromycetes
- Order: Baeomycetales
- Family: Xylographaceae
- Genus: Brianiopsis; S.Y.Kondr. (2022)

Type species
- Brianiopsis globulosa (Coppins) S.Y.Kondr. (2022)

Species
- B. aliphatica B. cerebriformis B. globulosa B. gyrizans B. gyromuscosa B. impavida B. mullensis

Genus of lichen-forming fungi

Brianiopsis is a genus of lichen-forming fungi in the family Xylographaceae. It comprises seven species of crustose lichens. The genus was established in 2022 to accommodate species previously classified in Rimularia and Lambiella that form a distinct evolutionary lineage based on DNA analysis. Species are characterised by thalli composed of rounded, strongly convex segments (areoles) that sometimes develop short stalks, and by the presence of stictic acid-related compounds rather than gyrophoric acid in their tissues.

== Taxonomy ==
Brianiopsis was introduced in 2022 by Sergey Kondratyuk, on the basis of a combined molecular dataset including internal transcribed spacer (ITS), mitochondrial small subunit (mrSSU) and nuclear large subunit (nLSU) rDNA sequences. In that study, the new genus was erected to accommodate Rimularia globulosa as the type species, together with six additional species that had previously been treated in Rimularia in the sense of Hannes Hertel and Gerhard Rambold (1990), and more recently placed in Lambiella. Phylogenetically, they form a well-supported sister clade to Lambiella.

In proposing Brianiopsis, Kondratyuk and co-authors used a combination of morphological and chemical traits to characterise the genus, including a thallus made up of rounded, strongly convex and sometimes stipitate areoles, the presence of stictic acid–related compounds and fatty acids in the medulla, and a frequent reduction or absence of gyrophoric acid. Rambold suggests that Kondratyuk et al. did not present a particularly strong argument for recognising this lineage at generic rank. Within the current higher-level classification, Brianiopsis is placed in the family Xylographaceae (order Baeomycetales, class Lecanoromycetes), where the combined Brianiopsis–Lambiella clade forms a sister group to Xylographa in a broad sense. The generic name Brianiopsis honours the British lichenologist Brian John Coppins for his work on the taxonomy of the Trapeliaceae; because the suffix -opsis denotes resemblance, Rambold regards the name as formally awkward, as if suggesting similarity to another genus already named after Coppins, which is not the case.

Kondratyuk's segregation of several Lambiella species into Brianiopsis has not been accepted by all taxonomists, some of whom prefer to maintain the previous classification pending further study.

== Description ==
Species of Brianiopsis resemble those of Lambiella in general appearance, but the thallus is made up of rounded, strongly convex areoles that can sometimes become distinctly stalked (stipitate). The medulla typically contains stictic acid–related compounds and various fatty acids as the main lichen products, and gyrophoric acid is usually absent.

== Species ==
- Brianiopsis aliphatica (T.Sprib. & Resl) S.Y.Kondr. (2022)
- Brianiopsis cerebriformis (Kantvilas) S.Y.Kondr. (2022)
- Brianiopsis globulosa (Coppins) S.Y.Kondr. (2022)
- Brianiopsis gyrizans (Nyl.) S.Y.Kondr. (2022)
- Brianiopsis gyromuscosa (Aptroot) S.Y.Kondr. (2022)
- Brianiopsis impavida (Th.Fr.) S.Y.Kondr. (2022)
- Brianiopsis mullensis (Stirt.) S.Y.Kondr. (2022)
