= Lambiella andreaeicola =

Scientific classification
- Kingdom: Fungi
- Division: Ascomycota
- Class: Lecanoromycetes
- Order: Baeomycetales
- Family: Xylographaceae
- Genus: Lambiella
- Species: L. andreaeicola

Binomial name
- Lambiella andreaeicola (Fryday) Fryday (2019)

Synonyms
- Rimularia andreaeicola Fryday (2012)

Species of lichen-forming fungus

Lambiella andreaeicola is a species of moss-dwelling crustose lichen in the family Trapeliaceae. It is found in the Falkland Islands.

== Taxonomy ==
It was originally described by the British lichenologist Alan Fryday in 2012, who initially classified it in the genus Rimularia. The holotype, preserved as specimen MSC 0108540, was collected by Henry Imshaug and Richard Harris in 1968 in the Falkland Islands, on East Falkland at Table Rock on Mount Usborne. The specimen was gathered from feldmark outcrops on the summit. Fryday recombined the taxon in Lambiella in 2019.

== Description ==
The thallus forms scattered, brown, often grey-pruinose (finely frosted) areoles (small, tile-like patches) roughly 0.15–0.2 mm across, with a bumpy, blistered (bullate) surface. It grows directly over mosses of the genus Andreaea. The cortex (outer skin) is not sharply defined, though its cells are brown and about 5 μm across. The medulla (inner tissue) does not stain with iodine. The photobiont (algal partner) is chlorococcoid, with cells measuring 8–12 μm in diameter.

Apothecia (disc-shaped fruiting bodies) are black, rounded to occasionally somewhat angular, and flat, 0.5–0.7 mm across, with a thick, raised, and persistent proper exciple (rim). The hymenium (spore-bearing layer) is colourless, stains blue with iodine (I+), and is 130–140 μm tall; the epihymenium (uppermost layer) is pale brownish and 10–15 μm thick. Paraphysoids (sterile filaments among the spore sacs) are 1.0–1.5 μm thick, septate and bead-like (moniliform), richly branched and interconnecting, with tips swollen to about 4 μm and capped with dark pigment. Asci (spore sacs) are broadly cylindrical to somewhat club-shaped, roughly 55–60 × 20–30 μm, of the Rimularia-type. Each ascus contains eight ascospores that are colourless, single-celled (simple), thick-walled (wall about 1 μm), and measure 15–18 × 10–12 μm. The hypothecium (tissue beneath the hymenium) is pale to mid-brown and merges into the exciple, which is dark brown, cup-shaped, and about 100 μm wide. Conidiomata (asexual fruiting structures) were not observed.

No substances were detected by thin-layer chromatography, and all spot tests are negative (C−, K−, KC−, P−), though the material available for analysis was very limited.
