= Xylographa vitiligo =

Conservation status
- Apparently Secure (NatureServe)

Scientific classification
- Kingdom: Fungi
- Division: Ascomycota
- Class: Lecanoromycetes
- Order: Baeomycetales
- Family: Xylographaceae
- Genus: Xylographa
- Species: X. vitiligo

Binomial name
- Xylographa vitiligo (Ach.) J.R.Laundon (1963)

Synonyms
- List: Spiloma vitiligo Ach. (1803); Coniocarpon vitiligo (Ach.) DC. (1815); Variolaria vitiligo (Ach.) Turner (1839); Agyrium spilomaticum Anzi (1864); Pertusaria lactea f. spilomatica (Anzi) Arnold (1872); Xylographa spilomatica (Anzi) Th.Fr. (1874); Xylographa parallela var. spilomatica (Anzi) Hedl. (1892); Xylographa corrugans Norman (1872)

Species of lichen

Xylographa vitiligo is a species of wood- and bark-dwelling lichen in the family Xylographaceae. This European lichen typically grows on the wood of fallen trees and stumps, occasionally colonising the bark of coniferous species, and is found primarily in northern latitudes and mountainous regions. The species has a complex taxonomic history due to confusion in the original specimens, which required later designation of a lectotype to clarify the name's application.

== Taxonomy ==
It was originally described by Erik Acharius in 1803, as Spiloma vitiligo. Jack Laundon transferred the taxon to the genus Xylographa in 1963. Use of the name has long been unsettled because Acharius's original material included more than one species. Holien and Tor Tønsberg later chose a lectotype at BM to fix the application of the name (a lectotype is a single specimen selected from mixed original material to serve as the name-bearing type); that specimen contains stictic acid, whereas other pieces Acharius cited contain gyrophoric acid and probably belong to Trapeliopsis flexuosa.

They also lectotypified allied names, showing that "X. spilomatica" had often been used as a catch-all for both X. vitiligo and the soralia-forming species now described as X. soralifera, while X. corrugans represents X. vitiligo.

In the same study they noted that Laundon's 1963 statement placing the holotype in H (herbarium of the University of Helsinki) is incorrect; the original material on which Acharius based the name is at BM (Natural History Museum, London).

== Habitat and distribution ==
This nitrogen-avoiding species typically inhabits the wood of fallen trees and tree stumps, occasionally colonizing the bark of coniferous species. Its precise distribution across Britain remains poorly understood, largely because historical specimens lack detailed location records and few modern collections have been made. The species likely grows in appropriate habitats throughout Scotland's Highland regions, with historical evidence suggesting it was also present in Britain's lowland areas before industrial pollution became prevalent during the 1800s. Its range appears limited to Europe, where it predominantly occurs in northern latitudes and mountainous terrain.
