= Xylographa erratica =

Scientific classification
- Kingdom: Fungi
- Division: Ascomycota
- Class: Lecanoromycetes
- Order: Baeomycetales
- Family: Xylographaceae
- Genus: Xylographa
- Species: X. erratica

Binomial name
- Xylographa erratica T.Sprib. (2014)

Species of lichen-forming fungus

Xylographa erratica is a species of lichen-forming fungus in the family Xylographaceae. It is a wood-inhabiting lichen that grows on conifer logs in boreal forests and on coastal driftwood, known from scattered localities across northern Europe, northeastern Asia, and western North America. The species was described in 2014 and is named for its irregularly oriented fruiting bodies, which point in different directions rather than following the wood grain.

== Taxonomy ==
Xylographa erratica was described as a new species by Toby Spribille in 2014. The original material (holotype) was collected in Russia's Khabarovsk Krai (Bureinskiy Zapovednik) from conifer logs in a Larix gmelinii forest near a stream at about 880 m elevation. The epithet erratica refers to the species' fruiting bodies, whose tips point in irregular directions rather than aligning with the wood grain. The type specimen is kept in the collections of the mycological herbaria of the botanical museum of the Finnish Museum of Natural History.

== Description ==
The species is a wood-inhabiting lichen whose sterile fungal threads (hyphae) grow through the wood and become lichenized by forming internal plugs of algal cells. As these plugs merge and expand, they can swell when wet and push apart the wood fibres, producing a cracked, "unkempt" surface appearance. The algal partner (photobiont) is a green, rounded (chlorococcoid) alga about 9–20 μm in diameter. The fruiting bodies (ascomata) are small, narrowly to broadly oval (ellipsoid), and typically develop singly, elongating in one direction. The disc may be exposed or partly hidden and can appear flat to concave and brown, with a pale to dark brown margin that is not strongly differentiated from the surrounding tissue. Under the microscope, the asci are 55–75 μm long and mostly 12–15 μm wide, each containing eight oval ascospores that are typically 11–12 μm long and 5–6 μm wide, though occasional spores fall outside this range. Adjacent asexual fruiting structures (conidiomata) produce long, curved, thread-like (filiform) conidia (asexual spores) about 15–20 × about 0.5 μm. The thallus chemistry is characterized by stictic acid as the major lichen substance, with norstictic acid reported as trace or absent.

== Habitat and distribution ==
Xylographa erratica grows on conifer wood, including both coastal driftwood in the intertidal zone and inland wood in forest habitats. It has been reported from humid boreal conifer forests and along coastal beaches up to about 880 m elevation, and is known from scattered localities in northern Europe, northeastern Asia, and western North America between roughly 51° and 60°N latitude. In the continental boreal forests of the Russian Far East it may be locally abundant, and it can occur in the same maritime driftwood habitats as the similar species X. opegraphella.
