= Lambiella aliphatica =

Scientific classification
- Domain: Eukaryota
- Kingdom: Fungi
- Division: Ascomycota
- Class: Lecanoromycetes
- Order: Baeomycetales
- Family: Xylographaceae
- Genus: Lambiella
- Species: L. aliphatica

Binomial name
- Lambiella aliphatica T.Sprib. & Resl (2020)

Species of lichen

Lambiella aliphatica is a species of crustose lichen in the family Xylographaceae. It is found in Alaska. This thin, crust-like lichen forms speckled patches up to 3.5 cm (1.4 in) across, breaking into tiny angular pieces with dark-grey rims and paler centers, and produces minute black fruiting bodies that are deeply cup-shaped with a central bump. Described as new to science in 2020 from a specimen collected in Glacier Bay National Park and Preserve, it is distinguished by containing unidentified fatty acids rather than the typical lichen products found in related species.

== Taxonomy ==
The lichen was formally described as a new species in 2020 by Toby Spribille and Philipp Resl. The type specimen was collected in the Hoonah–Angoon Census Area of Glacier Bay National Park. Here it was found at an altitude of 907 m (2,976 ft) growing on an argillite rock in alpine scree. The specific epithet aliphatica refers to the unidentified fatty acids that are present in the thallus. It is the first member of genus Lambiella to contain primarily fatty acids in the thallus. Lambiella globulosa is similar in morphology, but this species contains stictic acid rather than fatty acids as the primary secondary metabolite.

In 2022, Sergey Kondratyuk and colleagues proposed to transfer species in the "Lambiella" impavida group (including L. aliphatica) into the new genus Brianiopsis.

== Description ==
Lambiella aliphatica forms a thin, crust-like patch that can coalesce into colonies up to about 3.5 cm (1.4 in) across. Under a hand lens the thallus breaks into tiny angular areoles only 0.2–0.5 mm wide; each has a dark-grey rim and a paler grey centre, giving the crust a speckled appearance. Microscopic sections show no true cortical skin: only the upper ten micrometres (μm) are pigmented grey, while the internal fungal tissue is otherwise undifferentiated. The lichen's photosynthetic partner is a single-celled green alga (Chlorococcum type), whose round cells measure 5–10 μm in diameter. Standard spot tests with potassium hydroxide (K), sodium hypochlorite (C) and para-phenylenediamine (PD) are all negative, but thin-layer chromatography detects two unidentified fatty acids, the feature that inspired the species epithet aliphatica.

The fruit bodies of L. aliphatica are minute, black apothecia that punctuate the crust either singly or in clusters of two or three. They are 0.25–0.5 mm across—occasionally reaching 0.7 mm—and can be round, angular, or even horseshoe-shaped. Mature discs are deeply cup-shaped with a conspicuous central bump (umbo); scanning electron microscopy reveals a sieve-like micro-texture on this umbo. The apothecial wall (excipulum) is 55–95 μm thick: brown inside but jet-black and carbonized for the outer 20–40 μm, and its hyphae swell noticeably in potassium hydroxide (KOH) solution. A clear hymenium 65–90 μm tall sits above a similarly thick hypothecium of dark, thick-walled hyphae. The hymenial gel turns wine-red in iodine (and blue after KOH pretreatment), and its branched paraphyses separate readily in KOH, each tip capped by internal brown pigment. Asci are club-shaped (clavate), roughly 42 × 15–18 μm, and contain eight smooth, colorless ascospores that are broadly ellipsoid and 8–9 μm long by 5–6 μm wide; the spores never develop internal walls (septa). No asexual reproductive structures (conidiomata) have been recorded to occur on this species.
