= Lambiella isidiata =

Scientific classification
- Domain: Eukaryota
- Kingdom: Fungi
- Division: Ascomycota
- Class: Lecanoromycetes
- Order: Baeomycetales
- Family: Xylographaceae
- Genus: Lambiella
- Species: L. isidiata

Binomial name
- Lambiella isidiata Aptroot (2015)

Species of lichen

Lambiella isidiata is a species of saxicolous (rock-dwelling) lichen in the family Xylographaceae. Found in Venezuela, it was formally described as a new species in 2015 by the Dutch lichenologist André Aptroot. The type specimen was collected from the Sierra Nevada de Santo Domingo (Merida) at an elevation of 3,500 m (11,500 ft), where it was found growing on siliceous rock. The species differs from other Lambiella species, as well as Rimularia species (a similar genus), in its long, slender, and sometimes branched isidia.

== Description ==
Lambiella isidiata forms a low, matt brownish-grey crust on siliceous rock at high elevations. Instead of a flat surface it is built entirely from densely packed isidia—minute, finger-like outgrowths that contain both fungal and algal partners and snap off easily to start new colonies. The isidia are cylindrical to slightly flattened or occasionally forked, reaching up to 0.9 mm long and 0.1–0.2 mm wide, and sit on a dark, felty hypothallus that radiates over the rock surface.

Black apothecia develop directly on the tips or bases of these isidia. Each fruit body is turbinate (top-shaped), angular in outline and 0.2–0.3 mm across, but they are usually clustered so closely that groups up to 0.8 mm wide resemble a miniature cushion composed of 4–15 separate discs. A slightly raised rim (about 0.1 mm high) surrounds each disc; the disc itself is initially flat but soon becomes gyrose, splitting into irregular radial sectors. Microscopic sections show a 5 μm-thick granular black epihymenium above a 60–100 μm-tall hymenium that mixes clear, bluish-grey and brown zones. The interwoven paraphyses are mostly unbranched and bead-necked (moniliform) near their tips. Broadly club-shaped asci contain eight spherical ascospores (6–8 μm diameter) arranged in two rows; when treated with potassium iodide solution they display a central blue plug surrounded by a separate blue ring—an iodine staining reaction typical of the genus. The medulla lacks a cortex; spot tests on the medulla are C−, K+ (yellow), P+ (orange), and UV−; thin-layer chromatography detects stictic acid as the main secondary metabolite.
