= Lithographa =

Scientific classification
- Domain: Eukaryota
- Kingdom: Fungi
- Division: Ascomycota
- Class: Lecanoromycetes
- Order: Baeomycetales
- Family: Xylographaceae
- Genus: Lithographa; Nyl. (1857)

Type species
- Lithographa petraea (Nyl.) Nyl. (1856)

Species
- L. graphidioides L. olivacea L. opegraphoides L. serpentina L. skottsbergii L. tesserata

Genus of fungi

Lithographa is a genus of lichen-forming fungi in the family Xylographaceae. These rock-dwelling lichens form tightly attached crusts that crack into small tile-like patches, typically appearing in shades of grey, brown, or nearly black. The genus includes six species found primarily in cold regions and high mountains, where they grow on hard rock surfaces in harsh environments. They reproduce through distinctive elongated or round fruiting bodies that appear as dark slits or discs embedded in the crusty surface.

== Taxonomy ==
The genus was circumscribed in 1857 by the Finnish lichenologist William Nylander, with Lithographa petraea assigned as the type species. This species is now known as Lithographa tesserata. Nylander characterized Lithographa as having a thallus that is evanescent (disappearing) or scarcely visible, with swollen apothecia, a rim-like epithecium, thick convex margins, spore sacs containing numerous spores, and very slender, somewhat branched paraphyses.

Rounded, sometimes gyrose apothecia in the related genus Lambiella set it apart from slit-disc Lithographa. Phylogenetic work places Lithographa in the same clade as bark-dwelling Ptychographa, and both differ from Wadeana, which has a weaker exciple, reddish apothecia and a filamentous green alga (Trentepohlia) as its photobiont.

== Description ==
Lithographa forms a tightly attached crust that cracks into small, tile-like patches (areoles). Each patch is coated by an epinecral layer—a thin film of dead fungal cells that lends a matt finish—and may be fringed by a barely visible prothallus, the pale hyphal growth that first colonises the rock. Thallus colour varies from pale grey through brown to almost black. Internally, the fungal partner houses minute, spherical green algae (a chlorococcoid photobiont). Chemical analyses reveal a suite of orcinol-derived compounds, including both depsides and β-orcinol depsidones.

The reproductive bodies are apothecia that range from elongate, slit-like lirellae to small angular or round discs. They sit flush with, or slightly above, the thallus and never bear a thalline rim; instead, the visible border is a true exciple—a dark, opaque ring of densely fused hyphae that radiate outward from the base. The disc itself is a narrow, black fissure. Inside, the clear hymenium turns blue with iodine staining, a sign of amyloid material in the ascus walls, while a sparse mesh of branched paraphyses threads the spore layer. Asci are club-shaped and always eight-spored; when stained, the sides of the ascus apex turn dark blue, but a broad central plug remains unstained, a pattern shared with the Trapelia type. Mature ascospores are typically single-celled (aseptate), colourless and ellipsoidal; two southern-hemisphere species develop somewhat muriform spores, although it is suspected that they may not belong to this genus. Many species also produce immersed pycnidia that release slender, rod-shaped conidia, but these structures are absent in the type species, L. tesserata.

== Species ==
- Lithographa graphidioides (Cromb.) Imshaug ex Coppins & Fryday (2006)
- Lithographa olivacea Fryday (2004)
- Lithographa opegraphoides Coppins & Fryday (2006)
- Lithographa serpentina Coppins & Fryday (2006)
- Lithographa skottsbergii (Zahlbr.) Fryday & Coppins (2007)
- Lithographa tesserata (DC.) Nyl. (1857)
