= Wadeana =

Scientific classification
- Kingdom: Fungi
- Division: Ascomycota
- Class: incertae sedis
- Order: incertae sedis
- Family: incertae sedis
- Genus: Wadeana; Coppins & P.James (1978)

Type species
- Wadeana dendrographa (Nyl.) Coppins & P.James (1978)

Species
- W. dendrographa W. minuta

Genus of fungi

Wadeana is a small genus of lichen-forming fungi in the division Ascomycota. Its to other taxa within the division is unknown (incertae sedis), and it has not yet been placed with certainty into any class, order, or family. The genus was established in 1978 by the British lichenologists Brian Coppins and Peter James, who named it after the veteran naturalist Arthur Edward Wade for his decades of work studying British lichens. These bark-dwelling lichens live almost completely hidden within the outer layers of tree bark and produce distinctive crack-like fruiting bodies with bright red-brown internal colouring.

== Taxonomy ==
Wadeana was erected in 1978 by the British lichenologists Brian John Coppins and Peter Wilfred James, who transferred Lithographa dendrographa (first described by William Nylander in 1864) to serve as the type species and placed the new genus in the family Patellariaceae. The authors named the genus in honour of veteran British field-naturalist Arthur Edward Wade, acknowledging his six decades of work on the country's lichens. Their paper also introduced a second species, W. minuta; the two species share a bark-dwelling, endophloeodal thallus with a Trentepohlia photobiont, ascocarps whose internal tissues become suffused with bright red-brown pigment, and unusually multispored asci that hold roughly 100–200 colourless ascospores.

Coppins and James differentiated Wadeana from the heterogeneous Lithographa by a suite of characters: the multispored asci (eight-spored in Lithographa), a proper excipule lined with periphysoid filaments that tapers beneath the hymenium, a conspicuous gelatinous matrix around the paraphyses, and the persistent red-brown pigmentation of the ascocarp tissues; moreover, Wadeana alone harbours Trentepohlia algae. These stable differences supported recognition of Wadeana as a distinct genus, while leaving Lithographa itself polyphyletic and in need of further revision. Despite its otiginal placement in the Patellariaceae, Wadeana is now considered to be of uncertain classification (Incertae sedis) in the Ascomycota.

== Description ==
Wadeana is a bark-dwelling lichen that hides almost completely within the outer layers of its host. The thallus forms a thin, endophloeodal film intertwined with orange-green Trentepohlia algae and is often visible only as a faint pale or reddish stain on smooth bark . Its fruit bodies are short, crack-like lirellae: they begin as narrow slits but soon swell into oval or slightly elongated black fissures framed by a persistent, glossy rim. As the lirellae mature the internal tissues, including the roof (epithecium), floor (hypothecium) and spore-bearing layer (hymenium), become suffused with a vivid red-brown pigment that intensifies with age and is especially striking when sections are examined in water; the colour shifts to fuscous brown in potassium hydroxide but brightens again in nitric acid. No asexual reproductive structures (pycnidia or soralia) have been observed.

Microscopically, the outer wall (excipulum) is thick at the sides but tapers beneath the hymenium and is lined with minute periphysoid filaments; its gelatinised hyphae give it a somewhat cartilaginous appearance. The jelly-embedded paraphyses are richly branched and often link together, while the asci are clavate-ellipsoid and unusually crowded with roughly 100–200 spores each. Spores are simple, colourless and extremely small: in W. minuta they are usually spherical, 2–3 μm across, whereas in the larger-fruited type species W. dendrographa they are ellipsoid, 5–8 × 3–4 μm.

== Habitat and distribution ==
Both recognised species of Wadeana live buried inside the outer bark (corticolous and endophloeodal) of mature, broad-leaved trees. They are most conspicuous on rough, neutral to mildly base-rich trunks of ash, elm and oak where a film of their orange partner-alga (Trentepohlia) is present. The lichens tolerate slight nutrient enrichment (hypertrophication), so they also survive on roadside or parkland trees that receive a little extra fertilising dust. Field records show a scattered but distinctly Atlantic pattern in Britain: specimens have been collected from Surrey's Albury Park, through the Lake District and Merioneth, to Highland sites such as Crieff, Kinloch Rannoch, Invermoriston and Loch Arkaig, indicating a wide north–south span yet overall rarity. The genus therefore appears tied to humid, relatively unpolluted woodlands and veteran park trees in north-west Europe, and is likely under-recorded owing to its minute fruit-bodies and almost invisible thallus.

== See also ==
- List of Ascomycota genera incertae sedis
