= James Mascall Morrison Crombie =

Scottish lichenologist (1831–1906)

- Born: 1831; Aberdeen, Scotland
- Died: 12 May 1906 (aged 74–75); Ewhurst, Surrey
- Education: Marischal College; Edinburgh University
- Scientific career
- Fields: Lichenology
- Workplaces: St Mary's Hospital Medical School
- Author abbrev. (botany): Cromb.

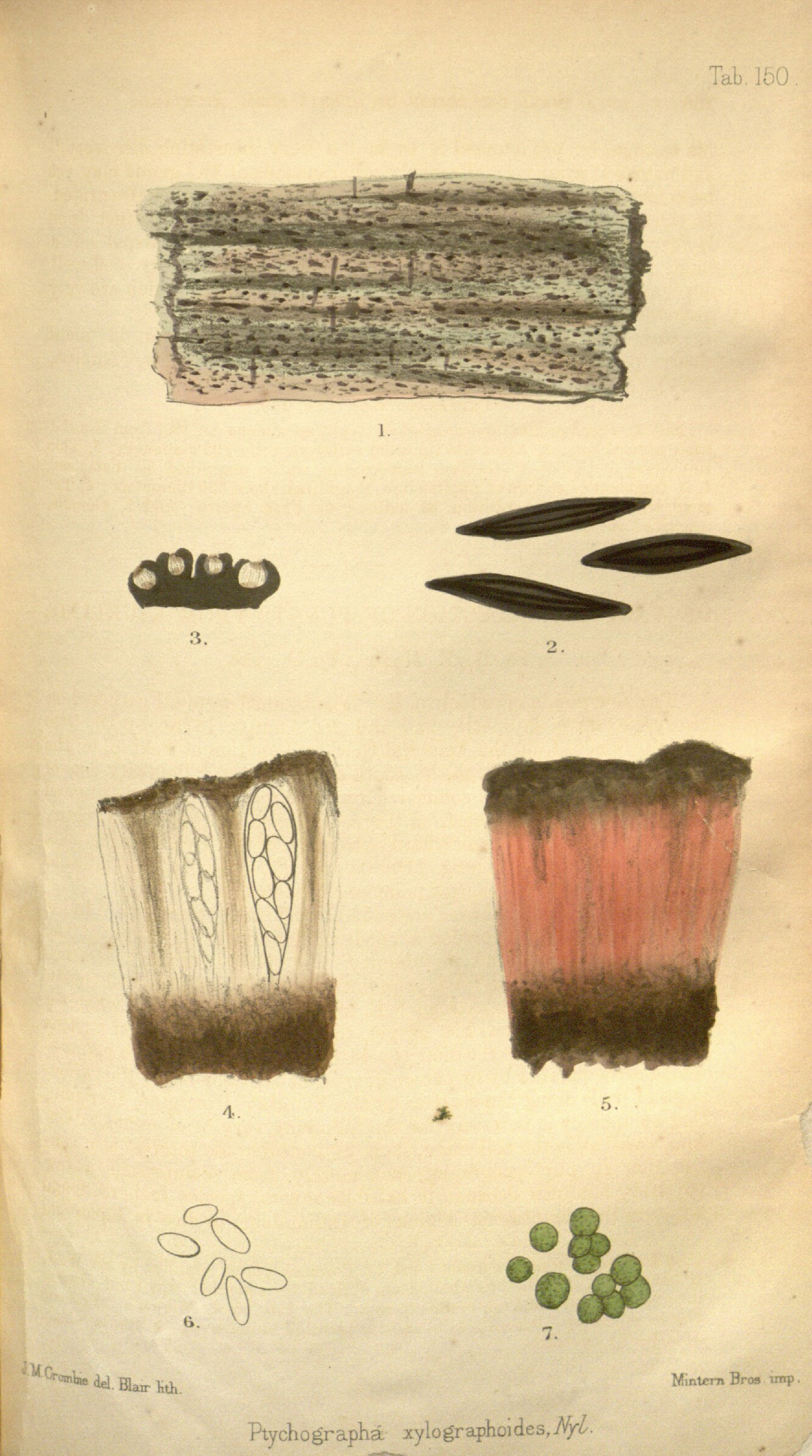
Drawing of Ptychographa xylographoides by Crombie, published in an 1874 issue of the Journal of Botany, British and Foreign

Rev. James Mascall Morrison Crombie (1831 – 12 May 1906) was a Scottish lichenologist. The standard author abbreviation Cromb. is used to indicate this person as the author when citing a botanical name.

== Biography ==
Crombie was born in Aberdeen sometime in 1831, and attended Marischal College. He went on to earn his M.A. from Edinburgh University. His first publication was a small volume on the natural history Braemar in 1861. In 1862, Crombie became an ordained minister in the Church of Scotland. He was named Fellow of the Linnean Society in 1869. He began to publish his accounts of British lichens in 1870. Between 1874 and 1877 he edited and distributed his exsiccata Lichenes Britannici exsiccati.

In 1879, Crombie was hired as a lecturer on botany at St Mary's Hospital Medical School, where he continued his studies on lichens. He determined specimens brought to him by travelers, and he delved into the herbaria of Johann Jacob Dillenius and William Withering. Many of his determinations were housed in the herbarium at Kew. Crombie, along with his friend William Nylander, rejected the symbiotic theory of lichens, which he passionate wrote about.

In 1891, Crombie left St Mary's and moved to London. He held various positions, including clerk to the synod in England. He retired in 1903, and died at Ewhurst, Surrey, on 12 May 1906.

Crombie was posthumously included in the 1911 Encyclopædia Britannica. Articles attributed to this author are designated by the initials "J. M. C."

== Selected publications ==
Between 1861 and 1901, Crombie had over 50 published contributions on British lichens, including accounts on those of Epping Forest, Middlesex, and Norfolk.

- Crombie, James Morrison (1861). Braemar: Its Topography and Natural History. John Smith.
- Crombie, James Morrison; Smith, Annie Lorrain (1894). A monograph of lichens found in Britain. Vol. Part I. London: British Museum (Natural History).
- Smith, Annie Lorrain; Crombie, James M. (1911). A Monograph of Lichens Found in Britain: Being a Descriptive Catalogue of the Species in the Herbarium of the British Museum, Volume 2. London, Trustees of the British Museum.
- Chisholm, Hugh, ed. (1911). "Lichens" . Encyclopædia Britannica (11th ed.). Cambridge University Press. (in part)

== See also ==
- Category:Taxa named by James Mascall Morrison Crombie

== Notes ==
1.Crombie claims he was born in 1833, but his widow stated he was born on 20 April 1830. Baptism records point to some time in 1831.
