= Xylographa soralifera =

Scientific classification
- Kingdom: Fungi
- Division: Ascomycota
- Class: Lecanoromycetes
- Order: Baeomycetales
- Family: Xylographaceae
- Genus: Xylographa
- Species: X. soralifera

Binomial name
- Xylographa soralifera Holien & Tønsberg (2008)
- Holotype: Cle Elum, Washington, USA

Species of lichen

Xylographa soralifera is a species of bark-dwelling, crustose lichen in the family Xylographaceae. It was described in 2008 and belongs to the X. vitiligo complex, but differs from that species in both morphology and chemistry, including its production of fumarprotocetraric acid.

== Taxonomy ==
Xylographa soralifera was described as new to science by Håkon Holien and Tor Tønsberg in 2008. The holotype is from Kittitas County, Washington, near Cle Elum; roughly 1,000 m (3,300 ft) elevation, where it was growing on conifer wood. In the same paper the authors clarified long-standing confusion within the X. vitiligo species complex by typifying several historical names (X. vitiligo, X. corrugans, and X. spilomatica).

The new species was set apart from X. vitiligo on the basis of its typically areolate thallus with convex, mostly pale (non-darkened) soralia and by its fumarprotocetraric acid chemistry; X. vitiligo instead has a poorly delimited thallus with excavate soralia and contains stictic acid (with satellite compounds).

== Description ==
The thallus (the lichen body) of Xylographa soralifera is crustose and occurs within to on the surface of the wood (endosubstratal to episubstratal). It is usually distinctly areolate (broken into small "tiles"), and sorediate—producing powdery propagules. Soralia (the patches that release soredia) are whitish to greenish, mostly convex, often with a thin pale rim, and about 0.3–0.6 mm across; they may coalesce. Soredia are comparatively coarse (mostly 14–26, less commonly up to 31) μm). The thallus is C−, K− and PD− in spot tests, while the soralia are PD+ (red); fumarprotocetraric acid is confirmed by thin-layer chromatography.

Fruiting bodies (apothecia) may be present or absent; when present they are round to narrowly elliptic, solitary or clustered, with a pale brown to flesh-colored disc that is flat to strongly concave. Typical dimensions are about 0.1–0.3 × 0.2–0.8 mm. Asci are cylindrical to more or less club shaped (clavate) (about 80–96 × 11–15 μm) with eight hyaline, simple (non-septate) ellipsoid to ovoid ascospores (about 10–16 × 6–7 μm). The photobiont is a green coccoid alga (8–15 μm).

Separation from similar taxa: compared with X. vitiligo, X. soralifera usually shows clearly convex areoles and soralia (X. vitiligo has indistinct areoles and sunken soralia), and the two differ chemically as noted above. Other sorediate, wood-associated species with overlapping chemistry can occur in similar habitats—e.g., Mycoblastus fucatus (bluish-gray thallus; soralia flat to excavate; contains atranorin), Ramboldia cinnabarina (often yellowish-white to gray-green soralia; atranorin present), and Pertusaria pupillaris (continuous, mostly endosubstratal thallus with larger, flat, pure-white soralia)—but these differ in thallus color, soralia form, and chemistry.

== Habitat and distribution ==
Xylographa soralifera grows on wood, most frequently on slowly decomposing, decorticated (bark-free) logs and stumps in relatively open forest. In Norway it is most often on spruce (Picea abies) and Scots pine (Pinus sylvestris), and more rarely on wood of downy birch (Betula pubescens), common juniper (Juniperus communis) and goat willow (Salix caprea). In North America it occurs on wood—and only rarely on bark—of several conifers including western larch (Larix occidentalis), pine (Pinus spp.), Douglas fir (Pseudotsuga menziesii), western redcedar (Thuja plicata) and western hemlock (Tsuga heterophylla).

The species has a northern and/or alpine tendency. In Europe it is known from Norway (Hordaland north to Finnmark, descending to sea level in the north), Sweden, and the Italian Alps. In North America it is recorded from the Pacific Northwest and interior mountains—Washington and Montana in the United States, British Columbia in Canada—and farther south at higher elevations in Arizona. Documented sites span roughly 600–2,900 m (2,000–9,500 ft) in elevation. The authors also note that Pacific coast driftwood in Washington and southwestern British Columbia commonly bears X. vitiligo, whereas X. soralifera has yet to be found there.
