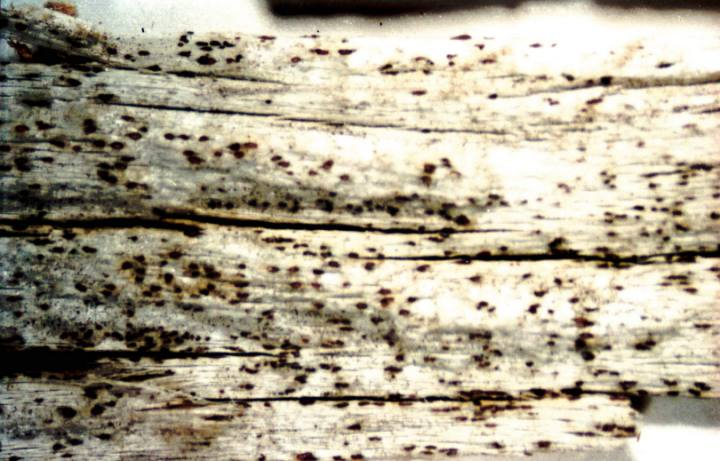

Conservation status
- Secure (NatureServe)

Scientific classification
- Kingdom: Fungi
- Division: Ascomycota
- Class: Lecanoromycetes
- Order: Baeomycetales
- Family: Xylographaceae
- Genus: Xylographa
- Species: X. parallela

Binomial name
- Xylographa parallela (Ach.) Fr. (1849)

Synonyms
- Lichen parallelus Ach. (1799)

= Xylographa parallela =

Species of lichen

Xylographa parallela is a species of lichen in the family Xylographaceae, and the type species of the genus Xylographa. Although it has been recorded mostly in montane and boreal forests between latitudes of about 35°N to 65°N, it is, however, the only species of Xylographa that has also been recorded from the Southern Hemisphere. It usually grows on conifer wood (very rarely on conifer bark), such as logs, snags, fenceposts, and rails.

== Taxonomy ==
The lichen was first formally described by Erik Acharius in 1799 under the name Lichen parallelus. Elias Magnus Fries transferred it to the genus Xylographa in 1849. Because the name Xylographa parallela has been used by researchers for Xylographa species with linear ascomata that are much longer than wide, it has historically been applied to a number of taxa that are now known to be different species.

== Description ==
The lichen forms narrow, ellipsoid ascomata (called lirellae) that measure 0.45–1.14 by 0.09–0.23 mm. The ascomata typically grow by extending one end laterally, although in rare circumstances the ascomata grow on both ends. In some older specimens, the ascomata peel off. The ascospores number eight per ascus, and are ellipsoid, usually measuring 11.3–14.5 by 5.9–7.6 μm.

Xylographa pallens is a lookalike species that is almost identical to X. parallela in both macroscopic and microscopic characteristics. It can be distinguished from the latter species by its growth habit: it develops ascomata in clusters with multiple leading tips that grow outward from a central point, and it has much ascoma-free space between each cluster.
