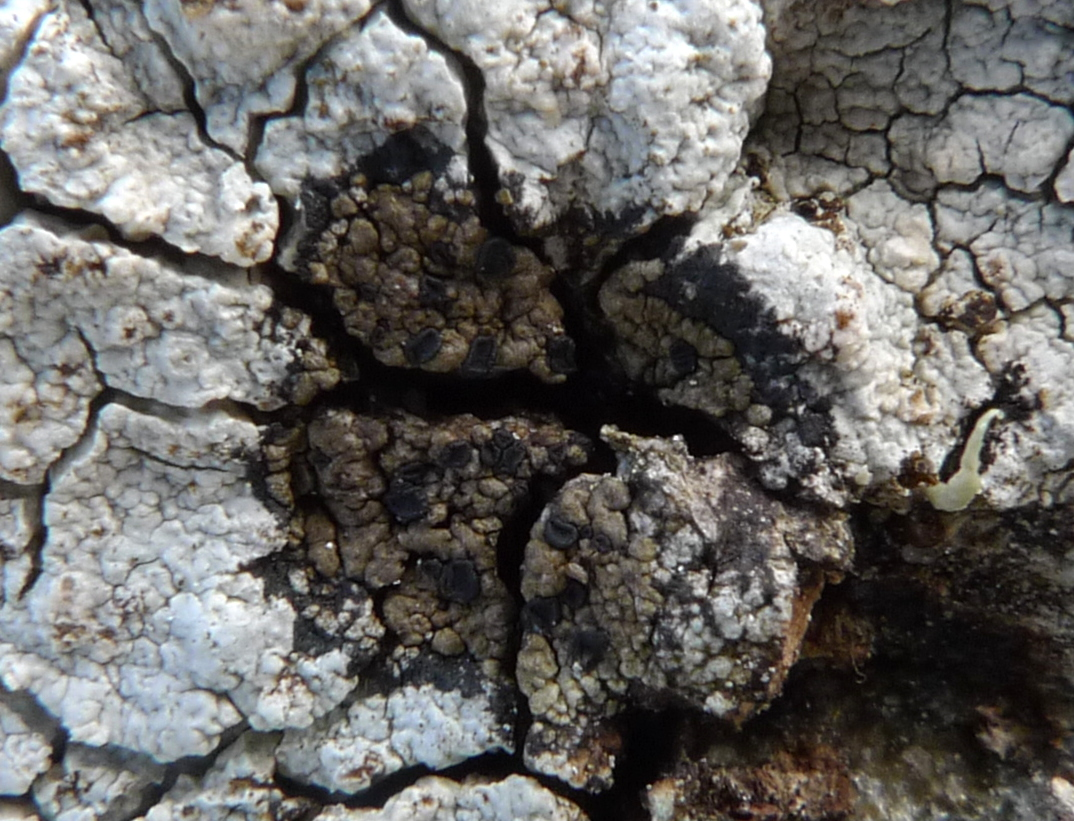
- Lambiella insularis growing parasitically on Glaucomaria rupicola

Scientific classification
- Kingdom: Fungi
- Division: Ascomycota
- Class: Lecanoromycetes
- Order: Baeomycetales
- Family: Xylographaceae
- Genus: Lambiella; Hertel (1984)

Type species
- Lambiella psephota (Tuck.) Hertel (1984)

= Lambiella =

Genus of lichen-forming fungi

Lambiella is a genus of lichen-forming fungi in the family Xylographaceae. These lichens form tightly adhering crusts that range from pale grey to deep black and are characterized by distinctive black reproductive structures with raised rims that often become ridged or lobed. The genus was established in 1984 by the German lichenologist Hannes Hertel and is named in honour of the British polar explorer and lichenologist Elke Mackenzie, with molecular studies in the 2010s confirming its status as a distinct group.

== Taxonomy ==
The genus was circumscribed by German the lichenologist Hannes Hertel in 1984, with Lambiella psephota assigned as the type species. The genus name Lambiella honours Elke Mackenzie (1911–1990), born as Ivan Mackenzie Lamb, who was a British polar explorer and lichenologist.

Soon after its description, several workers interpreted Lambiella as no more than a sectional variant of Rimularia and subsumed it under that larger genus. Molecular studies published three decades later overturned that view. Analyses by Toby Spribille and colleagues (2014), followed by a broader multilocus survey by Resl and colleagues (2015), showed that Lambiella forms a distinct clade within the Trapeliaceae, thereby justifying Hertel's original generic concept.

== Description ==
Lambiella forms a tightly adhering crust that varies from pale grey through brownish to deep black. Where well developed the thallus is a continuous film or a cracked mosaic of small, convex patches; some species develop tiny wart-like swellings or minute isidia‐like granules that break off to start new colonies. In a few taxa the lichen grows hidden within the surface of the rock or bark and is almost invisible to the naked eye. A dark, ill-defined prothallus may fringe or thread between the patches, while the inner medulla sometimes stains violet in iodine. The photosynthetic partner is a spherical green alga (chlorococcoid type), and several species live on other lichens yet still keep their own independent thallus. One species produces pin-prick soralia that release dark-brown powdery soredia.

Reproduction is through distinctive black apothecia that start flat and often become ridged or lobed. Each apothecium is ringed by a raised, persistent rim (thetrue exciple) that usually stands above the level of the disc. The outer surface of the disc is coated by a greenish-gold to dark-brown epithecium, while inside a mass of branched, bead-necked paraphyses weaves through the colourless to faintly green hymenium. Beneath lies a brownish hypothecium. The asci are broad clubs whose tips show a characteristic two-part reaction in iodine: a blue funnel-shaped zone with a smaller blue cone on top. They contain eight broadly ellipsoidal ascospores that remain colourless but may brown slightly with age and are thin-walled enough to distort during mounting. Immersed brown-black pycnidia release rod-shaped, clear conidia for asexual spread. The prominent black-rimmed apothecia and the moniliform paraphyses set Lambiella apart from similar genera; it differs most subtly from Rimularia, which has a narrower iodine-reactive zone in the ascus and usually lacks the depsidone chemical compounds found in many Lambiella species.

== Species ==
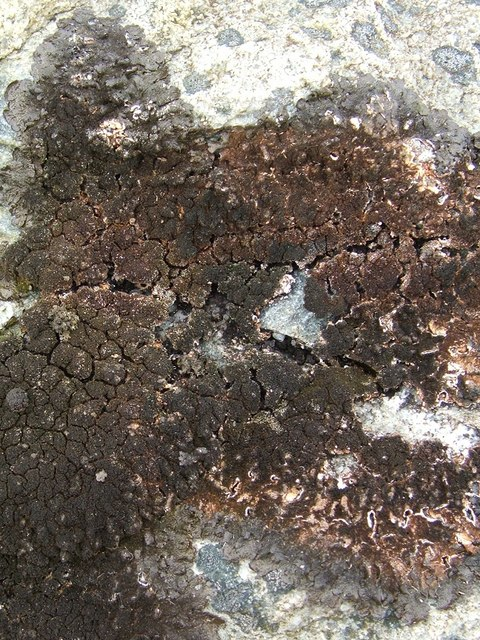
Lambiella furvella

- Lambiella aliphatica T.Sprib. & Resl (2020) – Alaska, US
- Lambiella andreaeicola (Fryday) Fryday (2019) – Falkland Islands
- Lambiella arenosa McCune & Lumbsch (2017) – Oregon, US
- Lambiella caeca (J.Lowe) Resl & T.Sprib. (2015)
- Lambiella furvella (Nyl. ex Mudd) M.Westb. & Resl (2015)
- Lambiella fuscosora (Muhr & Tønsberg) M.Westb. & Resl (2015)
- Lambiella globulosa (Coppins) M.Westb. & Resl (2015) – Europe
- Lambiella gyrizans (Nyl.) M.Westb. & Resl (2015)
- Lambiella hepaticicola (Kantvilas & Coppins) Resl & T.Sprib. (2015) – Australia
- Lambiella impavida (Th.Fr.) M.Westb. & Resl (2015)
- Lambiella insularis (Nyl.) T.Sprib. (2014)
- Lambiella isidiata Aptroot (2015) – Venezuela
- Lambiella mullensis (Stirt.) Fryday & Coppins (2021)
- Lambiella psephota (Tuck.) Hertel (1984)
- Lambiella sphacelata (Th.Fr.) M.Westb. & Resl (2015)
- Lambiella subpsephota (Fryday) Fryday (2019) – Falkland Islands
