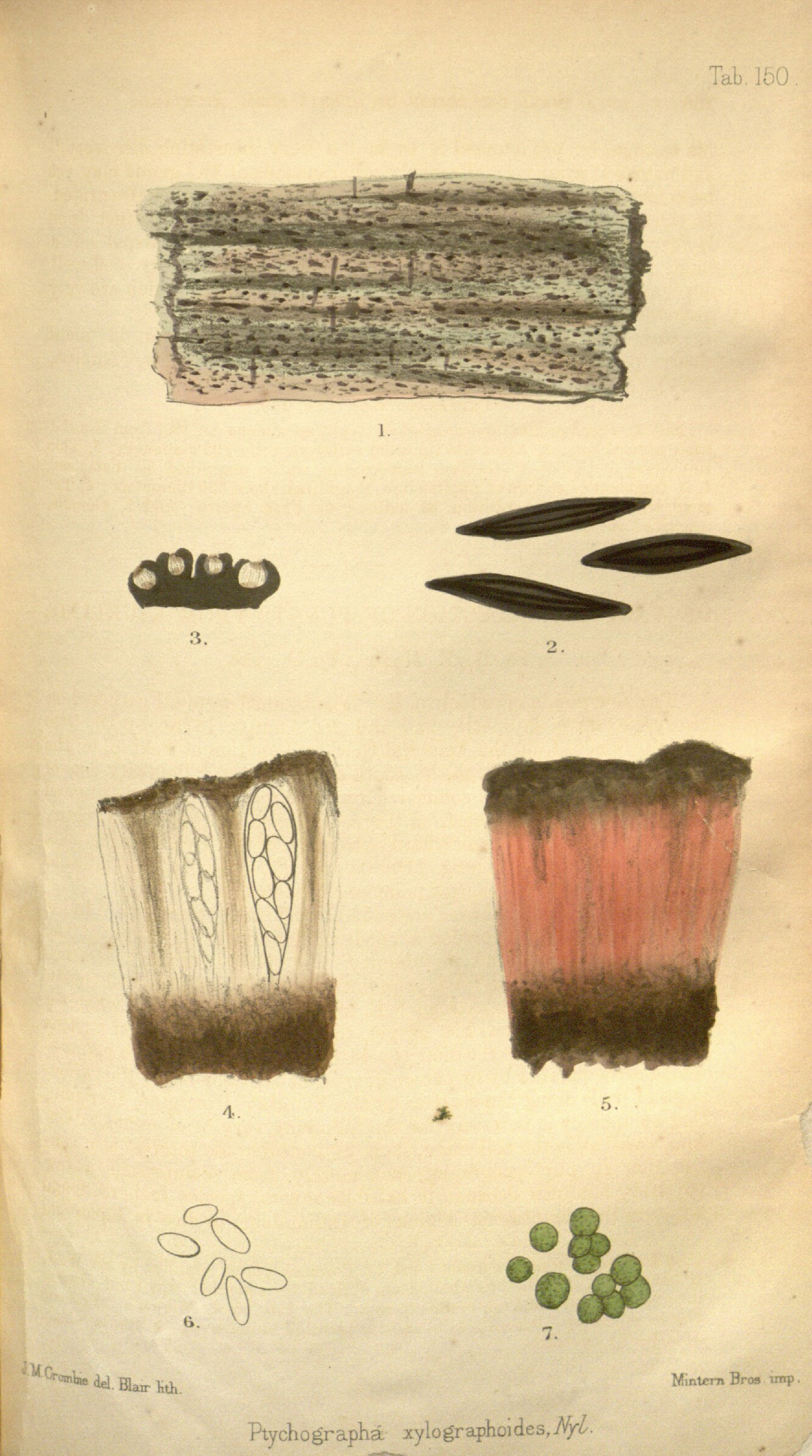
- Botanical illustration of Ptychographa xylographoides by J.M. Crombie & Blair, 1874

Scientific classification
- Domain: Eukaryota
- Kingdom: Fungi
- Division: Ascomycota
- Class: Lecanoromycetes
- Order: Baeomycetales
- Family: Xylographaceae
- Genus: Ptychographa; Nyl. (1874)
- Species: P. xylographoides

Binomial name
- Ptychographa xylographoides Nyl. (1874)

Synonyms
- Leptographa (Th.Fr.) M.Choisy (1950); Placographa sect. Leptographa Th.Fr. (1874); Ptychographomyces Cif. & Tomas. (1953)

= Ptychographa =

Single-species lichen genus

Ptychographa is a fungal genus in the family Xylographaceae. It is a monospecific genus, containing the single species Ptychographa xylographoides. This inconspicuous lichen grows as a barely visible coating of dark grains on rotting logs and branches in undisturbed old forests. The species is most readily identified by its narrow, elongated black fruiting structures that run parallel to the wood grain.

== Taxonomy ==
The genus Ptychographa was established by the Finnish lichenologist William Nylander in 1874 with the description of the type species Ptychographa xylographoides. In his original Latin diagnosis, Nylander characterized the genus by its white thallus with black, lance-shaped (lanceolate) apothecia. He described the apothecia as somewhat prominent above the flattened thallus, with longitudinally folded epithecium and margins the same colour. The asci were noted to contain eight colourless, simple ellipsoidal spores measuring 11–14 micrometres (μm) in length and 6–7 μm in width, with a slightly coloured epithecium and blackish hypothecium. Nylander also observed a reddish-brown gelatinous hymenium.

Nylander collected the type specimen from Scotland, growing on wood of Sorbus aucuparia (rowan), and noted its occurrence at Creag na Cailleach in Killin. He distinguished Ptychographa from the related genus Xylographa by noting that while both genera share similar apothecial characteristics, Ptychographa has a distinctive arrangement of hymenia that differs from Xylographa and Opegrapha, along with all other members of the Graphidaceae. Nylander concluded that the subglomerate conidia were absent in this genus.

== Description ==
Ptychographa xylographoides grows as an exceedingly thin crust that is often little more than a dusting of dark-brown grains on decaying wood. Each grain is a goniocyst—a microscopic packet in which a few green algal cells (the chlorococcoid photobiont) are wrapped by fungal hyphae. These goniocysts measure roughly 20–50 micrometres (μm) across and are sheathed in a uniform cortex of angular, brown-walled cells, giving the thallus its subdued matt appearance. Because the vegetative body is so inconspicuous, the lichen is easiest to spot when it develops its slit-like fruit bodies.

The reproductive structures are narrowly elongate apothecia (lirellae) that run parallel to the grain of the wood. Each lirella is 0.3–1.4 mm long yet only 0.1–0.3 mm wide, with a black fissured disc that may split into two parallel slits—each over a separate spore layer—separated by dark tissue. The rim surrounding the disc (the true exciple) is unusually thick, entirely black-brown and friable, being composed of tightly cemented hyphae. Internally, a dark-brown hypothecium merges into the exciple, while the clear hymenium above it reaches 45–60 μm in height and stains yellow then blue in iodine–potassium iodide tests. Sparse, mostly unbranched paraphyses thread the hymenium, their tips darkened and stuck together to form an epithecium.

Club-shaped asci contain eight smooth, colourless ascospores, 8.5–13 × 4.5–6.5 μm, that remain aseptate (single-celled) and lack any gelatinous sheath. The ascus apex shows a blue-staining outer coat in iodine, with a non-reactive dome at the very tip—an arrangement characteristic of the Trapelia type. Asexual propagation occurs through minute, immersed or superficial pycnidia that release rod-shaped conidia about 4–7 × 0.8 μm.

== Ecology ==
Ptychographa xylographoides species colonises the upper surfaces of fallen trunks and large branches in undisturbed, often ancient woodlands, where the damp, slowly rotting timber provides the stable microhabitat it requires.
