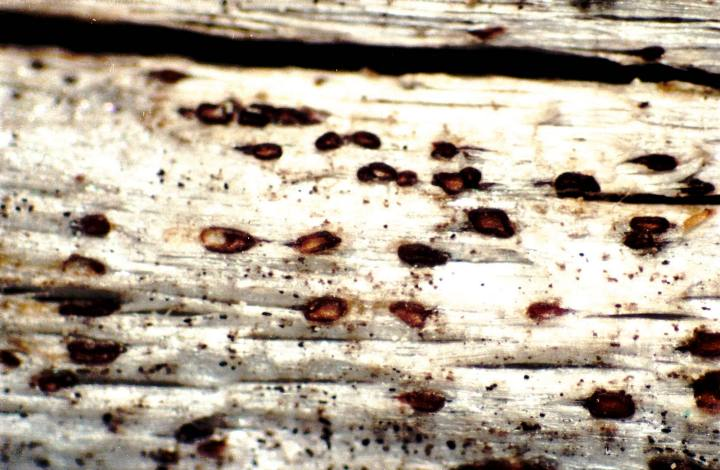
- A herbarium specimen of the lichen Xylographa parallela

Scientific classification
- Kingdom: Fungi
- Division: Ascomycota
- Class: Lecanoromycetes
- Order: Baeomycetales
- Family: Xylographaceae
- Genus: Xylographa (Fr.) Fr. (1836)

Type species
- Xylographa parallela (Ach.) Fr. (1849)

Synonyms
- Spiloma Ach. (1803); Spilonematopsis Vain. (1909); Stictis subgen. Xylographa Fr. (1822); Xylographomyces Cif. & Tomas. (1953)

= Xylographa =

Genus of lichen-forming fungi

Xylographa is a genus of lichen-forming fungi in the family Xylographaceae. These lichens are commonly found growing on decaying wood, where they form thin, often nearly invisible crusts. The genus is most readily recognized by its distinctive elongated, slit-like fruiting bodies that follow the grain of the wood.

== Taxonomy ==
The genus was originally proposed by Elias Magnus Fries in 1822 as a subgenus of the genus Sticta. He elevated it to distinct generic status in 1836.

== Description ==
Xylographa produces an inconspicuous crust that lies flush with, or just beneath, the surface of decaying wood. Where visible the thallus is a thin, diffuse film and may carry scattered brown goniocysts—microscopic granules in which a few spherical green algal cells are wrapped by fungal hyphae. Because the crust is either immersed or extremely thin, it often blends with the substrate and is easiest to detect once its fruit bodies appear. Chemical analyses reveal either the stictic acid complex, unnamed secondary metabolites, or no detectable lichen products.

The lichen's ascomata take the form of narrow lirellae that emerge partly embedded and mature into elongate, often one-sided slits aligned with the grain of the wood. Individual lirellae range from nearly round to distinctly linear but share a characteristic brown to dark-brown pigmentation and a low, flat disc. They lack a thalline margin; instead, a thin true exciple—pale to mid-brown rather than black—outlines each slit. Under the microscope the hymenium is colourless yet stains blue with iodine, while the hypothecium beneath remains clear. Delicate paraphyses thread the hymenium; these filaments branch only sparingly, widen gradually toward their brown-tipped apices and sometimes fuse with neighbouring threads. Club- to cylinder-shaped asci each contain eight smooth, single-celled ascospores that are initially colourless and only rarely become grey-brown in very old material. The ascus apex shows a diagnostic light-blue lateral zone surrounding a colourless plug in iodine preparations, matching the Trapelia structural type. Immersed, brown-black pycnidia frequently accompany the lirellae and release slender, slightly curved conidia. The combination of pale-brown exciple and less intensely pigmented lirellae separates Xylographa from the look-alike lichen Ptychographa (which has black, slit-domed discs), as well as from the non-lichenised wood-dwelling fungus Agyrium, whose apothecia are convex and dull orange.

== Species ==
As of March 2026, Species Fungorum (in the Catalogue of Life) accept 21 species of Xylographa.

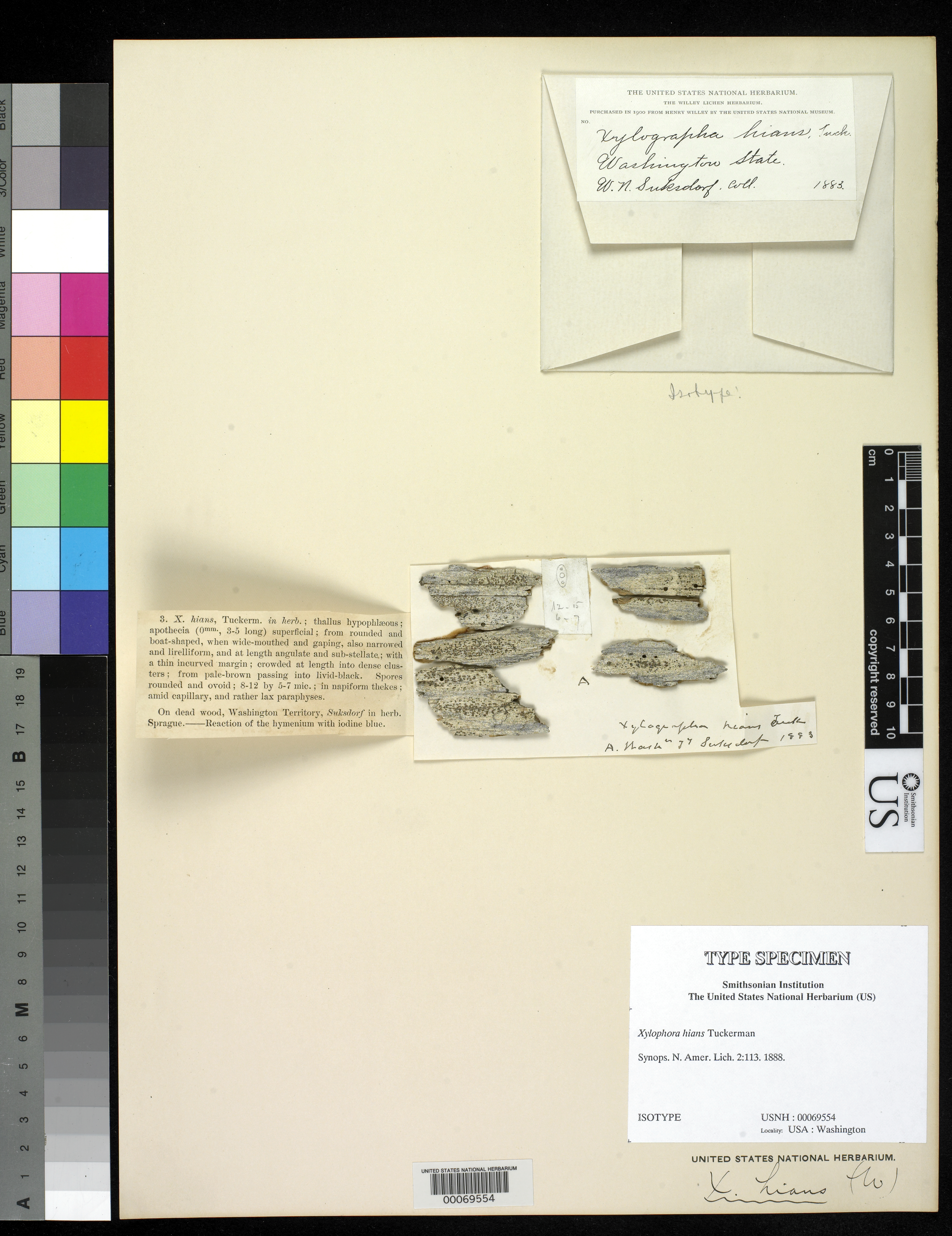
Herbarium specimen of Xylographa hians

- Xylographa bjoerkii T.Sprib. (2014)
- Xylographa carneopallida (Räsänen) T.Sprib. (2014)
- Xylographa constricta T.Sprib. (2014)
- Xylographa crassithallia B.D.Ryan & T.H.Nash (2004)
- Xylographa difformis Vain. (1928)
- Xylographa erratica T.Sprib. (2014)
- Xylographa hians Tuck. (1888)
- Xylographa isidiosa (Elix) Bendiksby & Timdal (2013)
- Xylographa lagoi T.Sprib. & Pérez-Ort. (2014)
- Xylographa opegraphella Nyl. (1857)
- Xylographa pallens (Nyl.) Malmgren (1861)
- Xylographa parallela (Ach.) Fr. (1849)
- Xylographa perminuta (Juss. ex Müll.Arg.) R.W.Rogers (1982)
- Xylographa pruinodisca B.D.Ryan & T.H.Nash (2004)
- Xylographa rubescens Räsänen (1921)
- Xylographa schofieldii T.Sprib. (2014)
- Xylographa soralifera Holien & Tønsberg (2008)
- Xylographa stenospora T.Sprib. (2014)
- Xylographa trunciseda (Th.Fr.) Minks ex Redinger (1938)
- Xylographa vermicularis T.Sprib. (2014)
- Xylographa vitiligo (Ach.) J.R.Laundon (1963)
