= Lignicolous lichen =

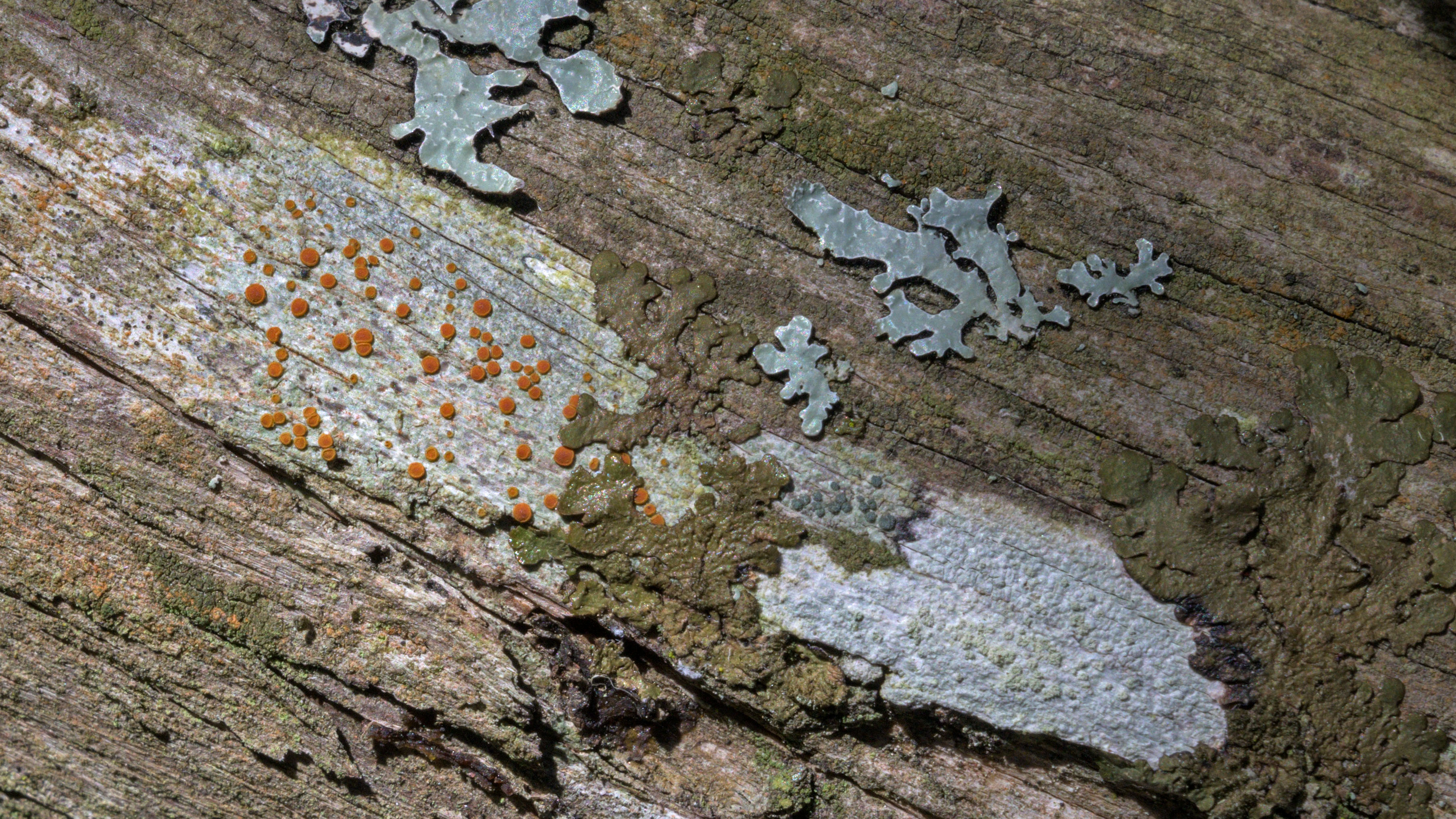
Lignicolous community with Athallia pyracea (orange).

A lignocolous lichen is a lichen that grows on wood that has the bark stripped from it. This contrasts with a corticolous lichen that grows on the bark, and saxicolous lichens that grow on rock.
