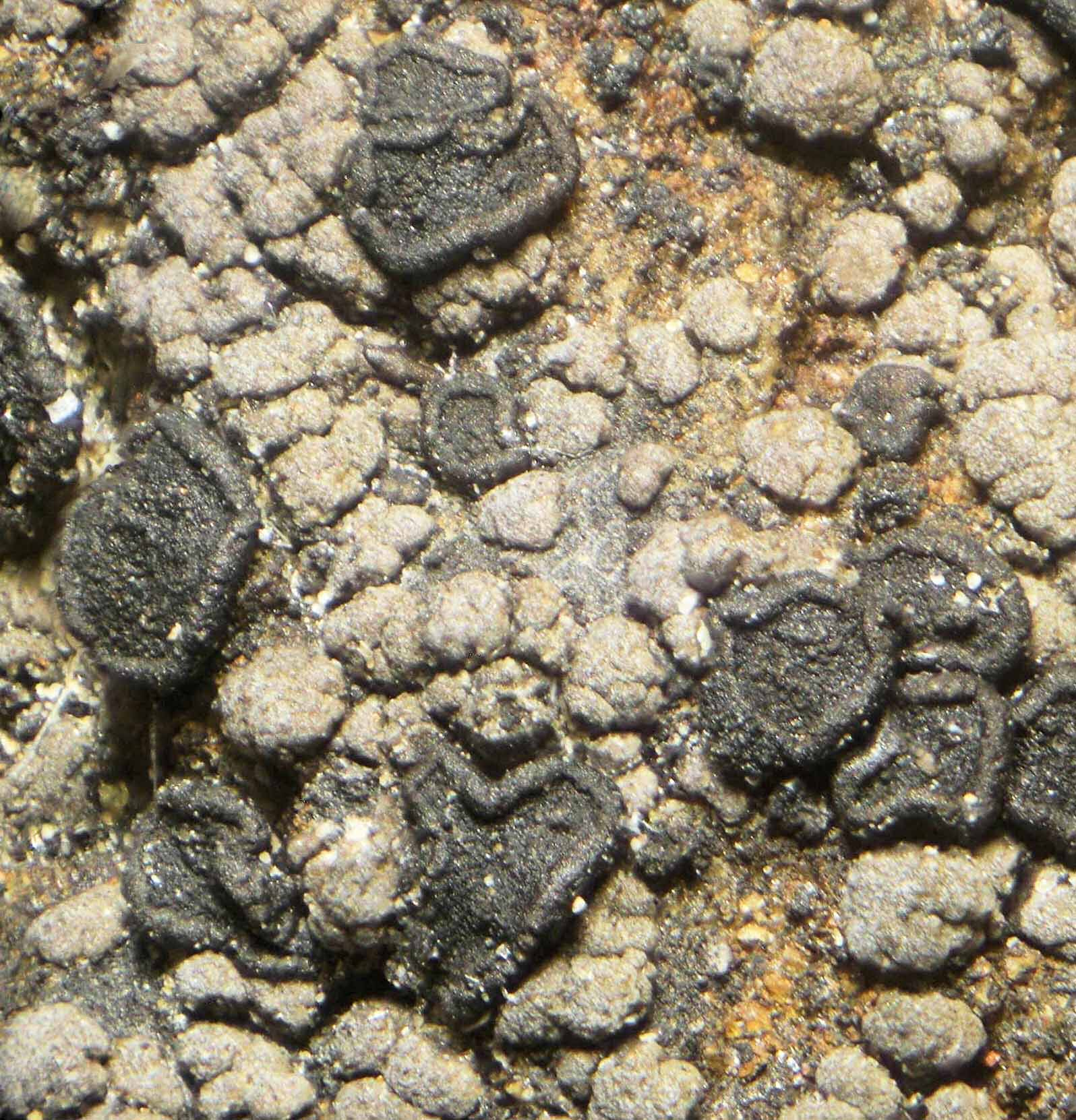
- Rimularia gibbosa

Scientific classification
- Kingdom: Fungi
- Division: Ascomycota
- Class: Lecanoromycetes
- Order: Baeomycetales
- Family: Trapeliaceae
- Genus: Rimularia; Nyl. (1868)

Type species
- Rimularia limborina Nyl. (1868)

= Rimularia =

Genus of lichen

Rimularia is a genus of lichen-forming fungi in the family Trapeliaceae. Established by the Finnish lichenologist William Nylander in 1868 from specimens collected on granitic rocks in France, the genus comprises 14 accepted species as of 2025. These rock-dwelling lichens form thin, crust-like growths that range from reddish-brown to dark olive-brown in colour and produce small black fruiting bodies with distinctive branched internal structures.

== Taxonomy ==
Rimularia was circumscribed by the Finnish lichenologist William Nylander in 1868. In his original description of the genus, Nylander characterized Rimularia as having a thin, ash-grey thallus that is either smooth or slightly roughened, with black fruiting bodies (apothecia) that are either flush with the surface or slightly raised. He noted that the spores are colourless, simple (undivided), and elliptical in shape, measuring about 0.018–0.025 millimetres in length. Nylander distinguished this new genus from related groups by several key features: unlike pyrenocarpous lichens, Rimularia lacks the small pore-like openings (ostioles) typical of that group, and unlike Mycoporum and Acarospora, it does not have the disc-shaped or flask-shaped fruiting body structure characteristic of those genera.

Nylander established Rimularia based on collections from granitic rocks in Gaul and Haute-Vienne, France, where it was found growing alongside Lecanora cinereae var. gibbosae. He noted that while the genus might appear similar to certain Pertusaria species at first glance, it could be reliably distinguished by the continuous nature of its thallus and the distinctive structure of its fruiting bodies, which lack the characteristic features found in the related genus Pertusaria.

== Description ==
Rimularia forms a thin, crust-like thallus that sits directly on the substrate rather than rising above it. The surface is continuous but may crack into small, irregular plates (areoles) as it ages. Depending on exposure and microhabitat the thallus ranges in colour from reddish or yellowish brown to dark olive-brown, and occasionally it appears chalk-white. A microscopic epinecral layer—an outer film of dead fungal cells—covers the living algal layer; there is no differentiated cortex. The photosynthetic partner is a minute, spherical green alga (a chlorococcoid photobiont).

Reproductive bodies are small, black apothecia that begin partly embedded and become stalkless (sessile) with maturity. Their discs can be flat, centrally raised like a tiny shield-boss (umbonate) or divided into winding ridges (gyrose). Unlike many lichens, Rimularia lacks a thalline margin; the visible rim is the true exciple, a persistent ring of contorted, often gyrose, black tissue. Inside, the upper hymenial layer reacts blue with iodine (I+), a signal of amyloid structures in the ascus apex. The paraphyses—slender sterile filaments threading the hymenium—are richly branched and interlinked (anastomosed) but their dark-tipped ends do not swell. Beneath, a dark-brown to black hypothecium merges with the exciple.

Each cylinder-to-club-shaped ascus (Rimularia-type) holds eight ascospores. These are initially colourless, ellipsoidal to almost spherical and single-celled, but turn brown just before they are released; they lack the gelatinous outer coat (perispore) seen in some other genera. Immersed pycnidia produce rod-shaped, transparent conidia that enable asexual propagation. Chemical analyses reveal a suite of secondary metabolites—norstictic, stictic and gyrophoric acids—along with an unidentified compound that fluoresces pink under ultraviolet light. Together with the branched paraphyses and the distinctive iodine-positive ascus apex, these features separate Rimularia from superficially similar brown-spored genera such as Porpidia and Fuscidea.

== Species ==
As of July 2025, Species Fungorum (in the Catalogue of Life) accept 14 species of Rimularia:

- Rimularia actinostoma Coppins & Fryday (2006)
- Rimularia australis Hertel & Rambold (1990)
- Rimularia austrolimborina Coppins & Fryday (2006)
- Rimularia badioatra (Kremp.) Hertel & Rambold (1990)
- Rimularia geumodoensis (S.Y.Kondr., Lőkös & Hur) S.Y.Kondr., Lőkös & Hur (2016)
- Rimularia gibbosa (Ach.) Coppins, Hertel & Rambold (1990)
- Rimularia hensseniae Hertel & Rambold (1990)
- Rimularia intercedens (H.Magn.) Coppins (1993)
- Rimularia limborina Nyl. (1868)
- Rimularia michoacanensis (B.de Lesd.) Timdal (2002)
- Rimularia paradoxa Timdal & W.A.Weber (2002)
- Rimularia psephota (Tuck.) Hertel & Rambold (1987)
- Rimularia ramboldiana Kantvilas & Elix (2007)
- Rimularia subconcava (H.Magn.) Timdal (2002)
