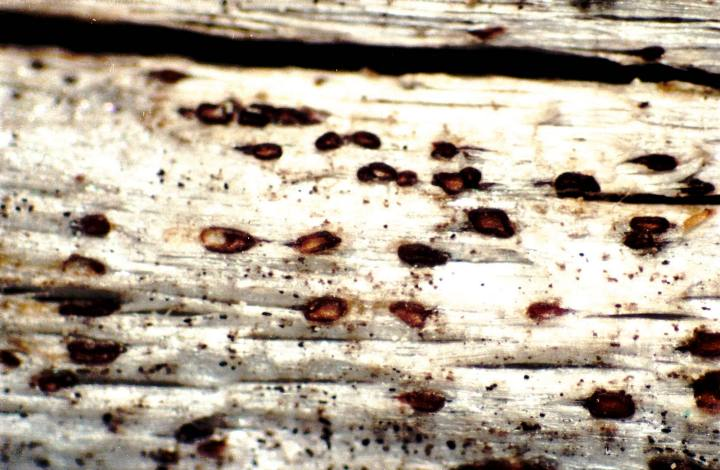
- Herbarium specimen of Xylographa parallela growing on driftwood; 30X magnification

Scientific classification
- Kingdom: Fungi
- Division: Ascomycota
- Class: Lecanoromycetes
- Order: Baeomycetales
- Family: Xylographaceae; Tuck. (1888)

Type genus
- Xylographa (Fr.) Fr. (1836)

Genera
- Lambiella; Lithographa; Ptychographa; Xylographa

Synonyms
- Lithographaceae Poelt (1974)

= Xylographaceae =

Family of fungi

Xylographaceae is a family of lichen-forming fungi in the order Baeomycetales. It contains four genera and 25 species.

== Taxonomy ==
The family was circumscribed in 1888 by American lichenologist Edward Tuckerman (as "Xylographei"). His concept of the family included only Agyrium, and the type genus, Xylographa. In 1929, British lichenologist Walter Watson published a system of lichen classification and included the genera Lithographa, Ptychographa, and Encephalographa in the Xylographaceae, leaving out Agyrium. After that, the family was rarely used until it was resurrected in 2015 following molecular phylogenetic analysis of trapelioid fungi in the subclass Ostropomycetidae. In this analysis, it was determined that trapelioid taxa fall into two major phylogenetic groups; the first group – containing the genera Rimularia, Placynthiella, Trapeliopsis, Trapelia, and Placopsis – are part of the family Trapeliaceae. The remaining trapelioid genera are in the Xylographaceae.

== Description ==
Most species in the Xylographaceae have linearized, hysteriothecial ascomata. These are ascomata with elongated ascocarps that are initially closed but open by means of a longitudinal fissure that exposes the hymenium.

== Genera ==
- Brianiopsis S.Y.Kondr. (2022) – 7 spp.
- Lambiella Hertel (1984) – 12 spp.
- Lithographa Nyl. (1857) – 10 spp.
- Ptychographa Nyl. (1874) – 1 sp.
- Spiloma Bornet (1856) – 11 spp.
- Xyloelixia S.Y.Kondr. (2022) – 4 spp.
- Xylographa (Fr.) Fr. (1836) – 2 spp.
