= Violella wangii =

Scientific classification
- Domain: Eukaryota
- Kingdom: Fungi
- Division: Ascomycota
- Class: Lecanoromycetes
- Order: Lecanorales
- Family: Tephromelataceae
- Genus: Violella
- Species: V. wangii

Binomial name
- Violella wangii T.Sprib. & Goffinet (2011)

Species of lichen

Violella wangii is a widespread, but seldom-collected species of crustose lichen in the family Tephromelataceae. It is found in mountainous areas of Bhutan, China, India and the Russian Far East. The lichen forms small, pale grey crusty patches on tree bark and weathered wood, typically at high elevations where cool, misty conditions prevail. Despite its wide distribution across Asia's mountain ranges, it remained unknown to science until the 21st century due to its remote habitat and inconspicuous appearance.

== Taxonomy ==
The lichen was formally described as a new species in 2011 by the lichenologists Toby Spribille and Bernard Goffinet. The type specimen was collected from Laojunshan Mountain in the Shennongjia Forestry District (Lijiang prefecture) at an altitude between 3,510 and 3,900 m (11,520 and 12,800 ft); there, in a montane forest of mostly Abies and Rhododendron, it was found growing on the bark of Rhododendron. In the Russian Far East, it has been recorded growing on the wood of Pinus pumila. Thin-layer chromatography of collected specimens showed the presence of three lichen products: atranorin, roccellic acid, and angardianic acid. The species epithet wangii honours Dr. Wang Li-Song, "for his ongoing efforts to describe the lichen diversity in western China".

Phylogenetic analyses place Violella close to Tephromela and Calvitimela but in a distinct clade, chiefly united by the presence of a violet hymenial pigment (Fucatus-violet) and by ascospores whose inner wall turns brown at maturity—features lacking in related genera. Within the genus, V. wangii differs from V. fucata in its larger, often sorediate thallus, bigger apothecia and its chemistry (atranorin with roccellic/angardianic acid rather than fumarprotocetraric acid).

== Description ==
The lichen forms pale grey crusts that can cover patches up to about eight centimetres across. The surface breaks into discrete, slightly swollen areoles 0.2–0.6 mm wide; where present, powdery reproductive granules (soredia) burst through the areole tips yet remain white, giving the thallus a frosted look. Internally, the photobiont is a green alga (Trebouxia-type), and chemical tests detect atranorin together with roccellic (or angardianic) acid.

Rounded black apothecia are frequent. They sit flat on the thallus, 0.7–2.6 mm in diameter, and their discs are saturated with the distinctive violet pigment that flashes peacock-green in potassium hydroxide solution. The hymenium may exceed 0.3 mm in height. Each ascus usually contains two large, single-celled ascospores (typically 42–54 μm × 21–31 μm). As the spores mature a second, inner wall develops and turns brown—an uncommon trait that helps identify the genus. Minute, sunken pycnidia are occasionally present; they release tiny curved rod-shaped conidia about 4–5 μm long.

== Habitat and distribution ==
Violella wangii is a high-montane species of temperate Asia. Verified collections span the Hengduan Mountains of Yunnan (about 3500–3900 m), the Black Mountains of Bhutan, Sikkim in northern India and the Bureya Range of the Russian Far East (around 1000 m elevation). In its southern range it grows on bark of rhododendrons within fir-rhododendron cloud forests, whereas northern material has been found on the weathered wood of Pinus pumila under larch scrub.

Although widely scattered, the species may be locally common on suitable bark or wood in cool, moist sites above the main tree-line. It often shares substrates with crustose lichens such as Mycoblastus affinis, indicating a preference for mildly acid, organically enriched surfaces in forests or krummholz belts subjected to high rainfall and frequent fog.
