= Tephromela superba =

Scientific classification
- Domain: Eukaryota
- Kingdom: Fungi
- Division: Ascomycota
- Class: Lecanoromycetes
- Order: Lecanorales
- Family: Tephromelataceae
- Genus: Tephromela
- Species: T. superba

Binomial name
- Tephromela superba Fryday (2011)

Species of lichen

Tephromela superba is a species of rock-dwelling, crustose lichen in the family Tephromelataceae. It has a creamy white to slightly yellowish thallus and distinctively large blue-black apothecia (fruiting bodies) measuring up to 5 mm in diameter. Microscopically, it features a tall hymenium with purple pigmentation and a distinctive hypothecium with a wide hyaline upper layer. The lichen contains various secondary metabolites including atranorin and α-collatolic acid. It has a circumsubpolar distribution in the Southern Hemisphere, occurring in southern South America (including Tierra del Fuego and Chile), the Falkland Islands, Campbell Island in the New Zealand Subantarctic Islands, and parts of Antarctica, where it grows on rocky substrates in exposed, cold environments.

== Taxonomy ==
Tephromela superba was first scientifically described in 2011 by the lichenologist Alan M. Fryday. The species epithet superba refers to the considerable size of its fruit bodies (apothecia) compared to related taxa. The type specimen (holotype) was collected from Puerto Roca on Isla de los Estados (Staten Island) in Tierra del Fuego Province, Argentina Specifically, it was found on the summit of a peak south of the bay on 21 October 1971, by Henry Imshaug and K.E. Ohlsson (collection number 51113) and is deposited in the Michigan State University herbarium (MSC).

Tephromela superba belongs to a group of species closely related to the type species of the genus, T. atra, sharing characteristics such as apothecia with a thalline margin, a purple-brown hymenium that turns purple with potassium hydroxide solution (K+), a golden brown hypothecium, and similar thalline chemistry. It is distinguished from T. atra by its massive apothecia (up to 5 mm in diameter), thin thallus, relatively low hymenium, unbranched paraphyses, and especially by its unusually wide, hyaline upper hypothecium.

== Description ==
Tephromela superba forms a thin thallus (the main body of the lichen) that is creamy white, sometimes with a slight yellowish or pinkish tinge. This thallus is typically up to 0.5 mm thick and spreads across the substrate with a thin, blackish prothallus (an advancing edge of fungal hyphae) at its margin. The surface appears cracked into small, flat, smooth areas called areoles that measure about 0.5–1.2 mm across. The thallus lacks a true cortex (protective outer layer) and has minute mineral inclusions in its medulla (inner layer).

The reproductive structures (apothecia) are quite distinctive in T. superba. They are initially attached to the thallus but become slightly raised as they mature. These apothecia are blue-black in colour, circular, and notably large (1.2–5.0 mm in diameter). The disc-shaped surface of each apothecium is slightly convex to almost hemispherical and often irregularly cracked. Young apothecia may have a thin thalline margin (a rim of tissue containing algal cells), but this becomes excluded in mature specimens.

Microscopically, T. superba has a tall hymenium (spore-producing layer) measuring 120–250 μm, with septate paraphyses (sterile filaments) that have a gelatinous sheath and are not or only slightly swollen at the tips. The hymenium contains purple pigment (described as "atra-red" in technical literature). The hypothecium (tissue beneath the hymenium) is distinctive with a golden brown lower section and a hyaline (colourless and transparent) upper layer that is unusually wide (50–80 μm). The spores are simple, colourless, thin-walled, and measure 12–13 by 8–10 μm.

Chemically, the lichen contains atranorin and α-collatolic acid, sometimes with alectoronic acid and traces of physodic acid.

== Habitat and distribution ==
Tephromela superba has a distribution that encircles the polar regions of the Southern Hemisphere, occurring in multiple landmasses surrounding Antarctica. This circumsubpolar pattern means the species is found in various locations that form a rough ring around the Antarctic continent, including southern South America (Tierra del Fuego, Argentina, southern Chile), the Falkland Islands, Campbell Island in the New Zealand Subantarctic Islands, and parts of Antarctica itself.

The species seems to prefer rocky substrates in exposed, cold environments. Collection sites include mountain summits, alpine regions, and feldmark landscapes (a vegetation type characterized by scattered cushion plants, lichens, and mosses growing in harsh, windswept terrain). Specimens have been found at elevations ranging from sea level to around 640 m (2,100 ft).
