= Calvitimela uniseptata =

Scientific classification
- Kingdom: Fungi
- Division: Ascomycota
- Class: Lecanoromycetes
- Order: Lecanorales
- Family: Tephromelataceae
- Genus: Calvitimela
- Species: C. uniseptata

Binomial name
- Calvitimela uniseptata G.Thor (2011)

Species of lichen

Calvitimela uniseptata is a little-known species of crustose lichen in the family Tephromelataceae. Found in Antarctica, it was described as new to science in 2011. The lichen forms small, wart-like to coral-shaped growths that are grey to greenish-grey in colour, with stalked fruiting bodies up to about a millimetre across. It grows on basalt rock outcrops near a nutrient-enriched site, having been found near old bird nest remains at around 500 metres elevation.

== Taxonomy ==
Calvitimela uniseptata was described in 2011 by Göran Thor on the basis of material collected in 1992 from Basen nunatak in Queen Maud Land, Antarctica. Thor placed the species in Calvitimela—a genus distinguished from Tephromela (in the strict sense) by its greenish, N-positive (red) epithecium and by Lecanora-type asci—because the new lichen shares these diagnostic features. The specific epithet uniseptata refers to the one-septate ascospores that characterise the species.

== Description ==
The thallus forms a mat of erect, wart-like to coral-shaped squamules that are grey to greenish-grey and lack any frost-like coating (pruina). A diffuse to well-defined whitish prothallus surrounds the squamules. Internally the medulla is whitish to greyish and contains calcium oxalate crystals; all standard spot tests (C, K, PD, UV, I, K/I) are negative and thin-layer chromatography has revealed no lichen substances. The algal partner photobiont) is a chlorococcoid green alga with cells 5–12 micrometres (μm) in diameter.

Apothecia (fruiting bodies) are frequent, clearly stalked at the base and reach up to 1.1 mm across. Their margin, when present, matches the thallus colour, while the disc ranges from black through brown to colourless with a pink tint in deep shade; it is never pruinose. The hymenium is 40–70 μm tall, iodine-positive (blue) and lacks oil droplets; the epithecium is colourless to dark olive-green and turns reddish-violet in nitric acid (N+). Paraphyses are sparsely branched and thin-walled. Asci are of the Lecanora type and contain eight colourless ascospores that are slightly curved to ellipsoid, predominantly one-septate (rarely without a septum) and measure 9–16 × 4–5 μm. Immersed, colourless pycnidia are uncommon; they produce slender, curved conidia 17–21 × 1 μm.

== Habitat and distribution ==
The species is known to occur only at its type localityon Basen nunatak, where it was abundant on basalt outcrops and on feather remains of an old snow-petrel (Pagodroma nivea) nest sheltered beneath a boulder at about 505 m elevation. The nest debris probably enriched the immediate substrate with nitrogen and phosphorus. Repeated searches in nearby ranges (Heimefrontfjella and Vestfjella) have not yielded further specimens, indicating that the lichen may be highly localised.
