= Tephromela follmannii =

Scientific classification
- Kingdom: Fungi
- Division: Ascomycota
- Class: Lecanoromycetes
- Order: Lecanorales
- Family: Tephromelataceae
- Genus: Tephromela
- Species: T. follmannii

Binomial name
- Tephromela follmannii Pérez-Vargas, Hern.-Padr. & Elix (2010)
- Type locality: Teide National Park, Canary Islands

Species of lichen-forming fungus

Tephromela follmannii is a species of saxicolous (rock-dwelling) crustose lichen in the family Tephromelataceae. It forms a thick, whitish to cream-coloured crust with black, glossy fruiting bodies up to 2–3 mm across. The species is found on basalt at moderate to high elevations on four islands in the Canary archipelago.

== Taxonomy ==
Tephromela follmannii was described as a new species in 2010 by Israel Pérez-Vargas, Consuelo Hernández Padrón, Pedro Pérez de Paz and John Elix, based on material collected on basalt at "Tiro del Guanche" in Teide National Park (Tenerife, Canary Islands) at 2,050 m elevation. The specific epithet honours the German lichenologist Gerhard Follmann, in recognition of his contributions to Canarian lichenology.

In the original description, the species was treated as closely related to the type species of Tephromela, T. atra, but separated by its thicker, more warty thallus, its much deeper violet hymenium, and a more complex set of secondary metabolites. The authors also compared it with the Australian T. stenosporonica and the Antarctic T. priestleyi, which share some anatomical traits but differ in thallus form and chemistry.

== Description ==
The thallus grows on rock and forms thick, pale patches divided into raised, warty areoles. It is whitish to cream-coloured and about 0.8–1.2 mm thick. It lacks both soredia (powdery propagules) and isidia (small outgrowths). Apothecia (fruiting bodies) are frequent and sit directly on the thallus. They are round, black, glossy, and typically up to 2 mm across, occasionally reaching 3 mm, with a persistent thalline rim around the disc.

Microscopically, the upper part of the apothecium is dark violet, and the hymenium is violet and stains blue in iodine (I+ blue), reaching about 150–200 μm in height; the true exciple is not apparent. The asci are Bacidia-type and 8-spored, and the ascospores are colourless and ellipsoid (about 10–11 × 6–7 μm). Reported lichen products include atranorin and a mixture dominated by alectoronic/β-alectoronic acids with minor collatolic acids; physodic and 4-O-methylphysodic acids were detected only in trace amounts.

== Habitat and distribution ==
Tephromela follmannii is known from basaltic rocks on four islands of the Canary archipelago: Tenerife, La Palma, Gran Canaria and La Gomera. It was described as ecologically flexible, but it seems to be most frequent at moderate to high elevations; collections span roughly 550–2,450 m.

On Tenerife it has been recorded in El Teide National Park around 1,900–2,050 m, in a montane shrub-dominated community locally referred to as "retamar". On La Palma it occurs from low-elevation ravines to high-mountain sites, including Canary pine forests and high-elevation shrublands ("codesar"). Records from Gran Canaria and La Gomera are also from basalt in pine-dominated habitats, including an old plantation on La Gomera at about 1,100–1,200 m elevation.
