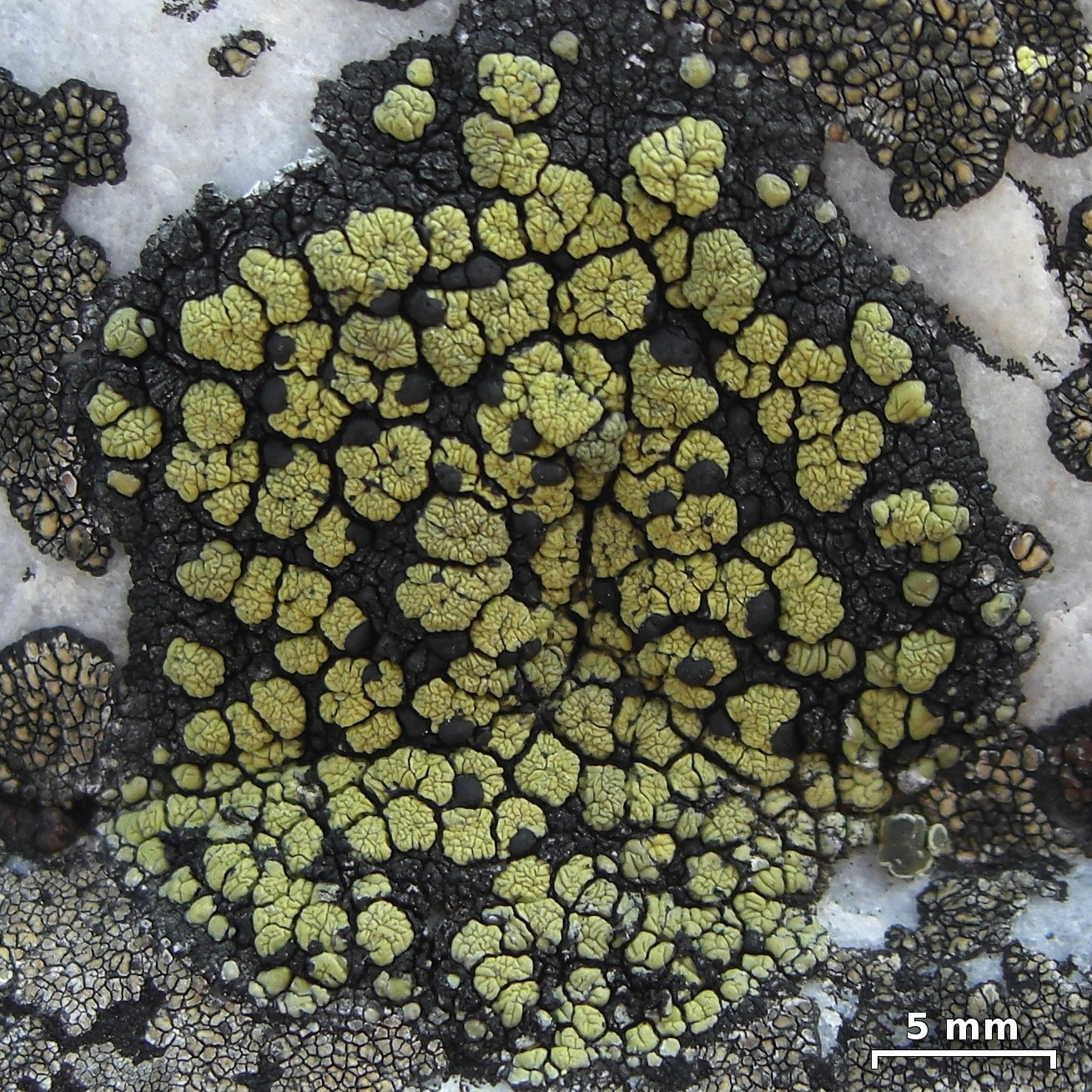
- C. armeniaca

Scientific classification
- Kingdom: Fungi
- Division: Ascomycota
- Class: Lecanoromycetes
- Order: Lecanorales
- Family: Tephromelataceae
- Genus: Calvitimela; Hafellner (2001)

Type species
- Calvitimela armeniaca (DC.) Hafellner (2001)

= Calvitimela =

Genus of lichen

Calvitimela is a fungal genus in the family Tephromelataceae, comprising 11 species of lichen. These lichens grow tightly attached to rocks, appearing as thin, crust-like layers on their surface. They are primarily found in alpine and arctic regions around the world. Calvitimela species are characterised by their areolate (segmented) thallus and black, shiny, convex apothecia (fruiting bodies). The genus currently includes eleven recognised species, though recent genetic studies have revealed unexpected diversity within this group. Calvitimela lichens are known for their varied secondary metabolites, which can sometimes aid in species identification. However, the taxonomy of the genus remains complex and challenging, with ongoing research uncovering new information about their relationships, distribution, and evolution. These lichens play important ecological roles in their harsh mountain and polar habitats, where they are often among the few organisms able to thrive.

== Taxonomy ==
The taxonomic history of Calvitimela is long and relatively complex. In the early days, the species now belonging to Calvitimela were placed in the classical genus Lecidea Ach., e.g. by Fries (1874; as Lecidea stirps L. armeniacae). and Magnusson (1931; as "Lecidea armeniaca- und elata-Gruppe") In the 1980s, several taxonomists revised large groups of lichens in Lecanora and Lecidea. First, the generic name Tephromela was resurrected, and the new monotypic family Tephromelataceae described. Then, a group from Lecidea was moved into the genus Tephromela M. Choisy. This led to species with both lecanorine and lecideine apothecia being present in the same genus. Finally, the genus Calvitimela was erected for species with lecideine apothecia previously placed in Tephromela.

Recent molecular phylogenetic studies have revealed that the taxonomy of Calvitimela is more complex than previously thought. The genus is now understood to be paraphyletic, with its subgenera and the genus Violella forming deeply divergent lineages that originated about 35 million years ago. The family Tephromelataceae consists of the genera Tephromela, Calvitimela, Mycoblastus and Violella, which together constitute a well-supported monophyletic group. However, resolving the deep phylogenetic relationships within Tephromelataceae has proven challenging, possibly due to incomplete lineage sorting or substitutional saturation.

Within Calvitimela, molecular studies have identified four distinct lineages in the subgenus Calvitimela, corresponding to C. armeniaca, C. melaleuca I, C. melaleuca II, and the newly recognized C. melaleuca III. This renders C. melaleuca, as traditionally circumscribed, paraphyletic. Additionally, a new clade sister to C. aglaea has been discovered within the subgenus Severidea.

The current taxonomic placement of Calvitimela presents challenges for classification. Options include accepting a paraphyletic Calvitimela, lumping all species in Calvitimela, Tephromela, and Violella into a broad Tephromela, or raising the current subgenera to generic rank. Each option has its drawbacks, and further research is needed to resolve these taxonomic issues.

== Description ==
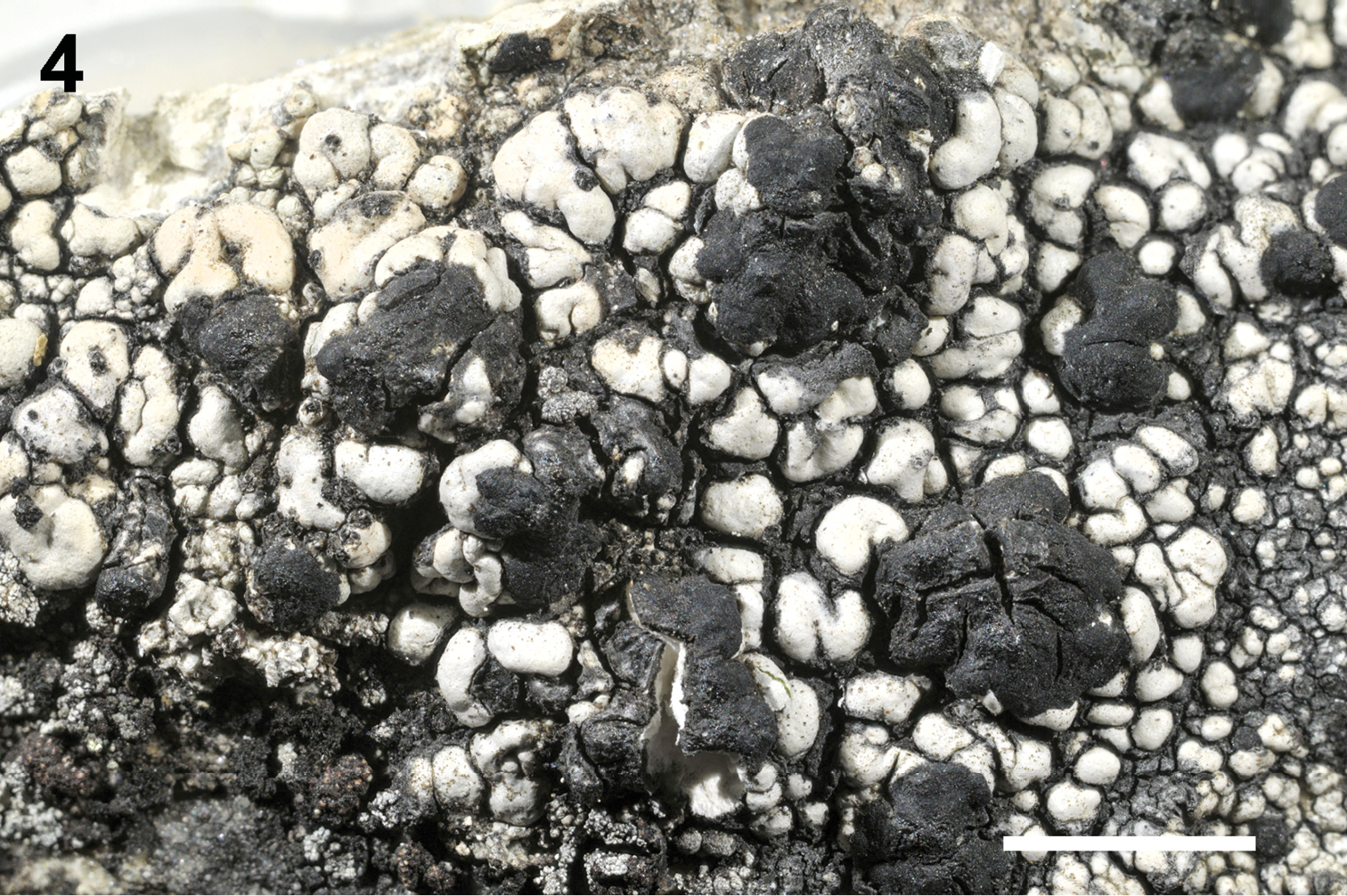
Calvitimela perlata

The species of Calvitimela are crustose lichens. Their thallus are areolate and their apothecia lecideine. The apothecia are convex, black and shiny. Apothecia are rare or entirely absent in some sorediate species e.g. C. cuprea, C. livida and C. talayana.

Asci are generally of the Lecanora-type, but Bacidia-type asci are also observed in C. aglaea and C. perlata. The spores are usually simple and ellipsoid.

Recent studies have revealed that thallus colour can be a diagnostic character for fresh specimens of C. melaleuca lineages. C. melaleuca I exhibits white to light brown thallus colour, C. melaleuca II shows yellow to brownish-yellow thallus colour, and C. melaleuca III has a beige coloured thallus.

Spore size has been found to be an important morphological character. C. perlata has significantly larger spores compared to other taxa in Calvitimela. The sister taxa C. melaleuca II and C. armeniaca have been observed to have narrower spores compared to other species in the genus.

An esorediate and fertile morphotype of C. cuprea has been discovered, extending the morphological range of this species. This finding implies that different reproductive strategies can occur within the same species of Calvitimela.

There is much chemical variation of secondary metabolites in the species of Calvitimela. Most prominently observed in the C. melaleuca – complex, with alectorialic, norstictic, roccellic and psoromic acids occurring in different combinations in the species´ several chemotypes. Recent studies have shown that the chemical profiles within subgenus Calvitimela are complex and overlapping, making it challenging to use chemistry as a diagnostic tool at the species level.

In the subgenus Severidea, C. aglaea is distinguishable from other species by containing bourgeanic acid and usnic acid. Other species in this subgenus share atranorin and stictic acid as major compounds.

The overall chemosyndrome in each subgenus of Calvitimela is distinct, making it informative at higher taxonomic levels. However, within subgenera, especially in subgenus Calvitimela, chemical characters are often homoplastic at the species level.

== Ecology and distribution ==
All species of Calvitimela grow on rocks. The species in Calvitimela reside either on boulders of varying size or directly on mountainous walls and are occasionally found on pebbles. A peculiar ecological preference is observed in C. cuprea. This species is more or less morphologically identical to C. livida, but seem to only grow on copper rich rocks, and is associated with old copper mine localities.

Species in Calvitimela are predominantly distributed in alpine to arctic regions, and they seem to have a circumpolar distribution. On the other hand, due to lack of sampling in certain regions of the world (e.g. Africa, Asia and South America), the true distribution of Calvitimela is only partly known. C. austrochilensis is described from Chile and C. uniseptata from Antarctica, respectively. These species have not yet been included in any molecular phylogenetic studies. Therefore, whether they belong in Calvitimela or not, is yet to be confirmed by molecular data.

Recent studies have provided more detailed insights into the ecology and distribution of Calvitimela species:

The different lineages of C. melaleuca (I, II, and III) show potential altitudinal preferences. C. melaleuca II and a subclade of C. melaleuca I appear to be connected to higher elevations, while C. melaleuca I seems to be more widely distributed at lower altitudes in Norway. C. cuprea has been confirmed to have a strong association with heavy metal-rich substrates, particularly copper. However, it has been noted that some individuals have been collected outside of mining habitats, suggesting a wider ecological tolerance than previously thought. The ecological distinction between C. cuprea and C. livida has been further clarified. While C. cuprea is primarily associated with heavy metal rocks, C. livida has a wider habitat range. The newly discovered clade sister to C. aglaea (referred to as C. sp.) was found to be morphologically similar to C. perlata, highlighting the importance of molecular data in understanding species distributions and ecology.

The circumpolar distribution of Calvitimela has been further supported by recent sampling efforts. However, it has been emphasized that more extensive sampling, particularly in understudied regions such as Africa, Asia, and South America, is needed to fully understand the global distribution patterns of these lichens.

The discovery of cryptic diversity within Calvitimela, particularly in Norway, suggests that there may be significant undiscovered diversity at a global level. This underscores the need for more comprehensive sampling and molecular studies to fully elucidate the ecological niches and distribution patterns of Calvitimela species worldwide.

== Phylogeny ==
Molecular phylogenetics has revolutionised the taxonomy of crustose lichens and revealed an extensive amount of cryptic species diversity. In Calvitimela there are some species that are morphologically identical, but are genetically distinct and have different chemotypes. In the C. melaleuca–complex at least two distinct chemical lineages are observed with no currently known morphological correlation.

Recent phylogenetic analyses have significantly expanded our understanding of Calvitimela. The subgenus Calvitimela now comprises four supported clades: C. armeniaca, C. melaleuca I, C. melaleuca II, and the newly recognised C. melaleuca III. This discovery renders C. melaleuca, as traditionally circumscribed, paraphyletic with respect to C. armeniaca.

Within the subgenus Severidea, C. aglaea has been shown to be genetically heterogeneous, with three highly supported groupings and one moderately supported grouping. A new clade, sister to C. aglaea, has also been discovered in this subgenus.

There have been few studies investigating Calvitimela from a molecular phylogenetics perspective. Only one phylogeny focusing exclusively on Calvitimela has been published. They found Calvitimela, Tephromela and Violella to constitute a well-supported monophyletic group. The relationship between the main clades remained partly unresolved, however. No study has yet included all species currently circumscribed to Calvitimela, but the genus is so far indicated to be paraphyletic.

Challenges in resolving deep phylogenetic relationships within Tephromelataceae persist, possibly due to incomplete lineage sorting or substitutional saturation. Molecular dating estimates suggest that the major lineages in Calvitimela and Violella diverged about 35 million years ago, indicating they represent relatively old evolutionary lineages.

The phylogenetic placement of two Southern Hemisphere species, C. austrochilensis and C. uniseptata, remains uncertain. Molecular evidence suggests that C. uniseptata may belong to the genus Lecania rather than Calvitimela.

Future phylogenetic studies may benefit from whole-genome sequencing approaches and broader taxon sampling to better resolve the evolutionary relationships within Calvitimela and the Tephromelataceae.

== Species ==
Calvitimela includes eleven species:

- Calvitimela aglaea (Sommerf.) Hafellner (2001)
- Calvitimela armeniaca (DC.) Hafellner (2001)
- Calvitimela austrochilensis Fryday (2011)
- Calvitimela cuprea Haugan & Timdal (2015)
- Calvitimela livida Haugan & Timdal (2015)
- Calvitimela melaleuca (Sommerf.) R.Sant (2004)
- Calvitimela perlata (Haugan & Timdal) R.Sant (2004)
- Calvitimela septentrionalis (Hertel & Rambold) McCune (2017)
- Calvitimela talayana (Haugan & Timdal) M.P.Andreev (2004)
- Calvitimela testaceoatra (Vain.) Hafellner (2001)
- Calvitimela uniseptata G.Thor (2011)
