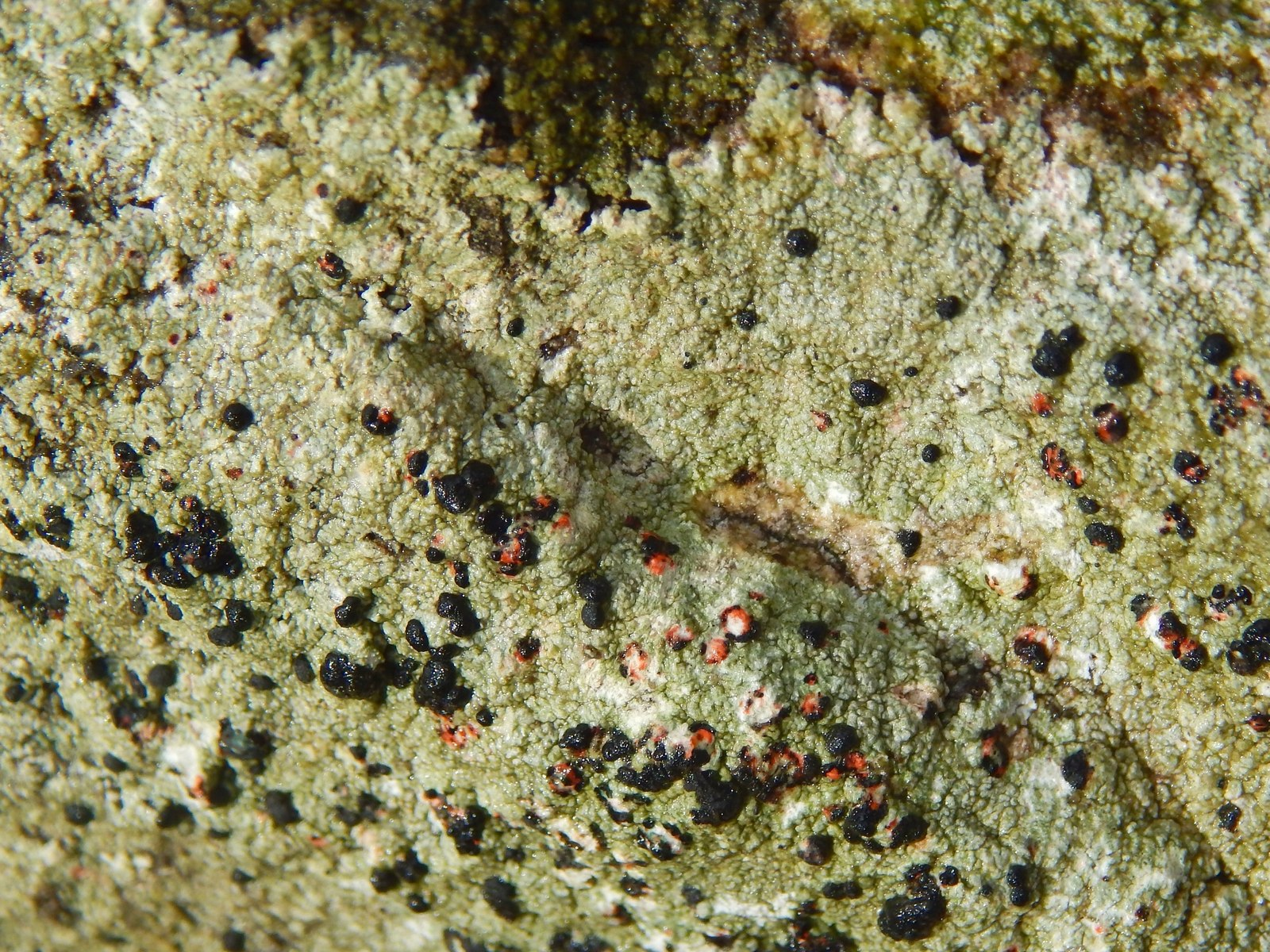

Conservation status
- Apparently Secure (NatureServe)

Scientific classification
- Kingdom: Fungi
- Division: Ascomycota
- Class: Lecanoromycetes
- Order: Lecanorales
- Family: Tephromelataceae
- Genus: Mycoblastus
- Species: M. sanguinarius

Binomial name
- Mycoblastus sanguinarius (L.) Norman (1926)

Synonyms
- List: Lichen sanguinarius L. (1753); Sphaeria sanguinaria (L.) Tode (1791); Verrucaria sanguinaria (L.) Humb. (1793); Lecidea sanguinaria (L.) Ach. (1803); Patellaria parasema A sanguinarius (L.) Mérat (1821); Patellaria sanguinaria (L.) Duby (1830); Heterothecium sanguinarium (L.) Flot. (1850); Megalospora sanguinaria (L.) A.Massal. (1852); Oedemocarpus sanguinarius (L.) Trevis. (1856); Biatora sanguinaria (L.) Hepp (1860); Lecidea didymospora Stirt. (1873); Lecidea sanguinaria var. endorhoda Th.Fr. (1874); Mycoblastus sanguinarius var. endorhodus (Th.Fr.) Stein (1879); Heterothecium sanguinarium var. endorhodum (Th.Fr.) Eckfeldt (1895); Mycoblastus sanguinarius f. leprosus Nádv. (1951)

= Mycoblastus sanguinarius =

Species of lichen-forming fungus

Mycoblastus sanguinarius, commonly known as the bloody heart lichen, is a widespread species of crustose lichen in the family Tephromelataceae. It is distinguished by its pale to dark grey thallus, which can appear very irregular and uneven, often with a thick, coarse, wart-like texture. The thallus may be continuous or somewhat cracked, with a prothallus that ranges from pale to dark grey. The apothecia (fruiting bodies) are frequent, black, and become convex or hemispherical as they mature. These structures develop on a bright carmine-red thalline cushion, which is revealed when the thallus is damaged or worn. The lichen grows in temperate and montane forests across Asia, Europe, and North America. Usually found on tree bark, it has been recorded less frequently on decorticated wood and moss-covered rocks.

== Taxonomy ==
The species was first scientifically described by Carl Linnaeus in his 1753 work Species Plantarum. As was the practice at the time, ha classified it in the eponymous genus Lichen. It was shuffled around to various genera in its taxonomic history, including Lecidea, Patellaria, Sphaeria, and Verrucaria, among others. In 1926, Johannes Musaeus Norman transferred it to the genus Mycoblastus. Molecular phylogenetics analyses have revealed that M. sanguinarius forms a monophyletic group within the genus Mycoblastus. This species complex includes multiple cryptic clades that are distinguished by their fatty acid profiles rather than morphological differences.

Studies have shown that M. sanguinarius is closely related to several other species within the genus, including the rare M. glabrescens. Within the broader M. sanguinarius complex, two deeply divergent species can be identified: one corresponds to the southern hemisphere species M. sanguinarioides, and the other matches M. sanguinarius in the strict sense, which is widely distributed in North America and Asia. These findings indicate that chemical differentiation, particularly in fatty acid composition, often precedes morphological changes and may drive speciation within the complex.

The presence of a deep red pigment, rhodocladonic acid, is a key characteristic of M. sanguinarius. This pigment is often visible in the tissue below the apothecia and gives the lichen its common name, "bloody heart lichen". The taxonomy of M. sanguinarius has been further complicated by historical recognition of unpigmented forms, which were sometimes classified as separate species, such as M. affinis and M. alpinus. Molecular data have now clarified these relationships, supporting the distinction of M. sanguinarius from other similar taxa and highlighting the cryptic diversity within this species.

== Description ==
The thallus of Mycoblastus sanguinarius ranges in colour from pale to dark grey. The thallus is often very irregular, thick, and has a coarse, wart-like (verrucose or papillose-warted) texture, giving it a marbled appearance. It can be continuous or somewhat cracked, and sometimes a pale to dark grey prothallus (the initial growth stage) is present. Soralia (propagules for asexual reproduction) are rare but, when they do appear, they are rounded, scattered, often few in number, and can be the same colour as or paler than the thallus. These soralia are convex and have an efflorescent (powdery) appearance.

The apothecia (sexual reproductive structures) are usually frequent and measure between 0.5 and 1.7 mm in diameter, occasionally up to 3.0 mm. They are black, becoming convex or hemispherical as they mature, and can be sessile (sitting directly on the thallus) or slightly constricted at the base. These apothecia develop on a bright carmine-red thalline cushion that becomes visible when the thallus is damaged or worn. The asci (spore-producing cells) typically contain 1 to 3 spores. The ascospores themselves are cylindrical with rounded ends, measuring 70–100 μm in length and 35–45 μm in width, with a thick wall of about 6–7 μm.

Mycoblastus sanguinarius also commonly has pycnidia, which are small asexual reproductive structures. These pycnidia are 40–50 μm in diameter, with dark green walls, and produce bacilliform (rod-shaped) conidia measuring 6–9 μm in length and about 1 μm in width. The cortex of the thallus reacts to chemical spot tests with C–, K+ (yellow), and Pd+ (yellow), while the medulla reacts K+ (red) in parts and UV–, indicating the presence of chemical compounds such as atranorin, chloratranorin, rhodocladonic acid, and caperatic acid. The soralia do not react to Pd. Underneath the apothecia, the tissue and hypothecium are carmine to blood-red, reacting K+ (bright red), with the pigment diffusing into the solution.

== Habitat and distribution ==
Mycoblastus sanguinarius grows in a variety of habitats, primarily growing as an epiphyte on tree bark in cool, moist environments. It is found in temperate forests across North America, Europe, and Asia. This lichen is particularly abundant in boreal and montane forests, where it often grows on the bark of coniferous trees such as spruce and fir. The species is also known to colonise decaying wood and, less frequently, mossy rock surfaces.

== See also ==
- List of lichens named by Carl Linnaeus
