= Calvitimela austrochilensis =

Scientific classification
- Domain: Eukaryota
- Kingdom: Fungi
- Division: Ascomycota
- Class: Lecanoromycetes
- Order: Lecanorales
- Family: Tephromelataceae
- Genus: Calvitimela
- Species: C. austrochilensis

Binomial name
- Calvitimela austrochilensis Fryday (2011)

Species of lichen

Calvitimela austrochilensis is a species of saxicolous (rock-dwelling), crustose lichen in the family Tephromelataceae, found in southern Chile and possibly on Marion Island. It has a creamy-white to yellow thallus with a cracked surface and distinctive blue-black reproductive structures. The lichen contains atranorin and other unidentified compounds and forms a symbiotic relationship with a green alga. First described in 2011 from a specimen collected on Desolación Island, it grows in moorland habitats and is known from only a few locations.

== Taxonomy ==
It was described as a new species in 2011 by the lichenologist Alan Fryday. The type specimen was collected on Desolación Island in Chile, along the southern side of Caleta San José in Bahía Tuesday. It was found in a moorland habitat on a hill and was gathered on 4 October 1969 by Henry Imshaug and Karl Ohlsson (collection number 44725). The holotype is preserved at the Michigan State University Herbarium (MSC).

== Description ==
Calvitimela austrochilenis is a crustose lichen with a creamy-white to yellow thallus that spreads widely and has a distinct margin. The thallus is relatively thick, measuring 0.5–1.5 mm, and features a thin bluish-grey prothallus at its edges. Its surface is cracked into small, flat areoles that are smooth and measure 0.3–0.5 mm across. Unlike some lichens, it lacks a protective outer cortex but contains pale brown pigmentation in its surface cells. The medulla, or inner fungal layer, contains large, insoluble crystals measuring 15–35 μm in diameter. The lichen's photosynthetic partner is a chlorococcoid green alga, with individual cells measuring 12–15 μm in diameter.

The apothecia (fruiting bodies) are embedded within the thallus and appear as small, blue-black discs that are typically round but may have slight irregularities. They range from 0.2 to 0.4 mm in diameter and have a concave surface. A narrow crack usually separates the apothecium from the surrounding thallus, though in some cases, remnants of the thallus adhere to it, forming a pseudothalline margin. The proper margin of the apothecium is usually indistinct, but when visible, it appears as a thin, slightly raised edge. The blue-black pigment within the apothecia sometimes extends patchily into the surrounding thallus.

Microscopically, the hymenium, the layer where spores develop, is 80–90 μm tall and contains scattered granules. The paraphyses—thin, thread-like structures that support the developing spores—are septate, occasionally branching and reconnecting, with a gelatinous sheath around 3 μm thick. Their tips are swollen to 5–8 μm in diameter. The epihymenium, the uppermost layer of the hymenium, is blue-black and reacts with chemical tests (H+ blue, N+ red) to produce a cinereorufa-green colouration. The hypothecium, the tissue beneath the hymenium, is thick (approximately 300 μm), and though it is inherently colourless, it appears pale brown due to the presence of minute crystals that dissolve in potassium hydroxide solution (K).

The lichen produces cylindrical, Lecanora-type asci measuring 60–70 by 15–17 μm, each containing simple, colourless ascospores. These spores typically lack internal divisions but occasionally develop a thin septum and measure 10–13 by 5–7 μm. The exciple, a rim of protective tissue surrounding the apothecium, is sometimes visible as a band of golden-brown cells, but the thalline exciple is absent. No asexual reproductive structures (conidiomata) have been observed in this species.

Chemical analysis of C. austrochilenis reveals the presence of atranorin and additional unidentified substances, as detected by thin-layer chromatography.

== Habitat and distribution ==
In addition to the type locality, Calvitimela austrochilensis is known from only a few locations in southwest Chile, and from a single collection in Marion Island. This latter collection may represent a distinct species, as it has a less massively developed brownish hypothecium compared to the Chilean collections. Other lichens found close to C. austrochilensis include Lithographa olivacea and Pertusaria stellata.
