= Tephromela eviolacea =

Scientific classification
- Kingdom: Fungi
- Division: Ascomycota
- Class: Lecanoromycetes
- Order: Lecanorales
- Family: Tephromelataceae
- Genus: Tephromela
- Species: T. eviolacea

Binomial name
- Tephromela eviolacea Haldeman & McCune (2021)

Species of lichen

Tephromela eviolacea is a species of corticolous, crustose lichen in the family Tephromelataceae. Found the Pacific Northwest of the United States at middle elevations, this lichen usually grows on bark of maple trees, but has also been reported from pines, Douglas fir, and Umbellularia californica. Typically lichen in the genus Tephromela have violet coloration of their hymenium; T. eviolacea is distinguishable for being the only lichen in this region lacking this trait.
