= Tephromela lignicola =

Scientific classification
- Domain: Eukaryota
- Kingdom: Fungi
- Division: Ascomycota
- Class: Lecanoromycetes
- Order: Lecanorales
- Family: Tephromelataceae
- Genus: Tephromela
- Species: T. lignicola

Binomial name
- Tephromela lignicola Orange & Fryday (2019)

Species of lichen

Tephromela lignicola is a species of lignicolous (wood-dwelling), crustose lichen in the family Tephromelataceae. It is found in the Falkland Islands, where it grows on fenceposts and similar timber.

== Taxonomy ==
The lichen was formally described as a new species in 2019 by lichenologists Alan Orange and Alan Fryday. The type specimen was collected by the second author from Weddell Island, where it was found growing on a fencepost. The species epithet refers to its preferred substrate. Other lichens associated with Tephromela lignicola include Blastenia circumpolaris, Buellia punctata, Cliostomum griffithii, Lecanora expallens, and Xylographa vitiligo.

== Description ==
The thallus of Tephromela lignicola is endoxylic, meaning it is completely within its woody substrate. Its tiny soralia emerge from the surface, initially following the grain of the wood, but eventually forming a more or less continuous crust. The soredia are finely powdery (farinose) and pale green to blue-grey; individually they measure 20–25 μm in diameter, but aggregate into clumps that are up to 75–100 μm across. The lichen is sterile, meaning it does not produce apothecia. The photobiont partner is trebouxioid—spherical, unicellular green algae. Thin-layer chromatography shows that the lichen contains atranorin and alectoronic acid.

== Distribution ==
Tephromela lignicola is endemic to the Falkland Islands, and is locally frequent on East Falkland, West Falkland, and Weddell Island. It grows on fenceposts and worked lumber.

== Species interactions ==
Skyttea violacea is a lichenicolous fungus that has been noted to parasitise Tephromela lignicola.
