= Violella =

Scientific classification
- Domain: Eukaryota
- Kingdom: Fungi
- Division: Ascomycota
- Class: Lecanoromycetes
- Order: Lecanorales
- Family: Tephromelataceae
- Genus: Violella; T.Sprib. (2011)

Type species
- Violella fucata (Stirt.) T.Sprib. (2011)

Species
- V. fucata V. wangii

Genus of lichen-forming fungi

Violella is a genus of two species of crustose lichens in the family Tephromelataceae. The genus is characterized by its brownish inner ascospore walls, brilliant violet hymenial pigment (called Fucatus-violet), and thallus chemistry. The type species, Violella fucata, was originally placed in genus Mycoblastus, but molecular phylogenetic analysis showed that this species as well as the Asian species V. wangii formed a phylogenetically distinct clade and warranted placement in a new genus. The generic name Violella, a diminutive form of the Latin viola, refers to the characteristic hymenium colour.

== Taxonomy ==
The genus Violella was erected in 2011 by Toby Spribille and colleagues after DNA analyses showed that the Northern-Hemisphere lichen Mycoblastus fucatus and an undescribed Asian relative formed a well-supported clade within the family Tephromelataceae, separate from both Mycoblastus sensu stricto (in the strict sense) and the genera Tephromela and Calvitimela. Spribille's team judged that rolling these species into an already large Tephromela would blur useful generic boundaries, so they created Violella to accommodate the pair. The name is a diminutive of Viola and alludes to the striking violet granules that suffuse the hymenium of all known species.

Violella fucata—first described by James Stirton in 1879 as Lecidea fucata—was selected as the type species; over the years it has also travelled through the genera Megalospora and Mycoblastus before molecular data clarified its affinities. The second member, V. wangii, was described alongside the genus to encompass East-Asian material that shares the same violet pigment but differs in thallus size, chemistry and spore dimensions. Together the species are distinguished from superficially similar taxa by four linked traits: (i) the "Fucatus-violet" pigment, which turns peacock-green in K and raspberry-red in N; (ii) Biatora-type asci rather than Lecanora-type; (iii) large, simple ascospores whose inner walls become brown with age; and (iv) an atranorin-based chemistry instead of the alectoronic or fumarprotocetraric acids typical of allied genera.

Phylogenetically, Violella nests deep within Tephromelataceae but remains sister to both Tephromela and Calvitimela, supporting its recognition as a discrete lineage rather than a subclade of either genus. Ongoing sampling across temperate and montane forests suggests the genus has a circumboreal–East-Asian distribution, and further fieldwork may yet reveal additional species that share its unique combination of violet pigments, Biatora-type asci and melanising spore walls.

== Description ==
Violella forms thin, crust-like patches that sit tightly on bark or wood. The surface is broken into tiny angular flakes or low warts and is usually white to ash-grey, sometimes clothed in a fine powder of soredia (minute granules that contain both partners of the lichen and serve as propagules). A layer of microscopic green algae (chlorococcoid photobiont) is embedded in a white fungal medulla beneath a protective cortex. No distinct prothallus is developed. Chemical tests show atranorin together with a depsidone and a fatty acid in the thallus.

The reproductive bodies are distinctive: black, disc-shaped apothecia that begin immersed in the crust and later sit flush or slightly raised on a thin ring-like "thalline cushion" of tightly intertwined hyphae; this cushion is evident around very young discs but soon becomes overgrown and excluded. Under the microscope the spore layer (hymenium) is shot through with vivid violet granules—"Fucatus-violet"—which flash peacock-green in potassium hydroxide solution and raspberry-red in sodium hypochlorite. There is no separate epithecium; the violet pigment is dispersed through the hymenium. The inner cup wall (proper exciple) is highly reduced and composed of hyphae indistinguishable from the paraphyses, and the paraphyses are comparatively broad, straight to slightly curved, connected by delicate cross-bridges that separate easily in water. Each ascus is of the Biatora type and almost always contains two large, simple ascospores; as they mature, a second, internal wall develops and turns brown, a feature unique within the Tephromelataceae. Tiny flask-shaped pycnidia are rare; when present they release straight, colourless conidia.
