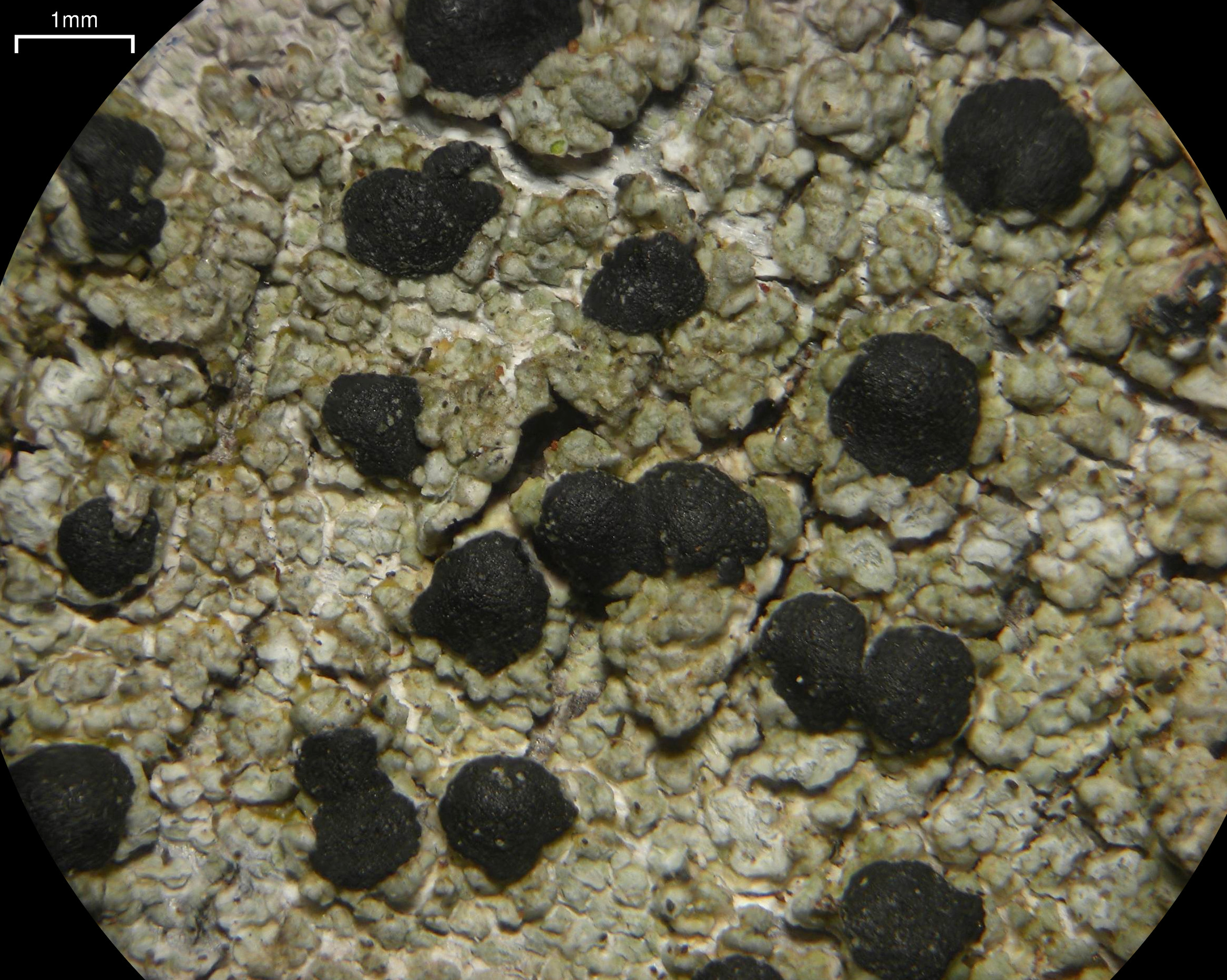
- Closeup of the lichen Mycoblastus sanguinarioides; scale bar is 1 mm

Scientific classification
- Domain: Eukaryota
- Kingdom: Fungi
- Division: Ascomycota
- Class: Lecanoromycetes
- Order: Lecanorales
- Family: Tephromelataceae
- Genus: Mycoblastus; Norman (1852)

Type species
- Mycoblastus sanguinarius (L.) Norman (1926)

Synonyms
- Megalospora A.Massal. (1852); Mycoblastomyces Cif. & Tomas. (1953); Oedemocarpus Trevis. (1857)

= Mycoblastus =

Genus of lichen

Mycoblastus is a genus of crustose lichens in the family Tephromelataceae. Members of the genus are commonly called blood lichens.

== Taxonomy ==
The genus was circumscribed in 1852 by Johannes Musaeus Norman, who selected the widespread Mycoblastus sanguinarius as the type species. This species was one of many introduced by Carl Linnaeus in his influential 1753 work Species Plantarum, as Lichen sanguinarius. In North America this species is colloquially known as the "bloody-heart lichen".

In 1984 Josef Hafellner created the family Mycoblastaceae to contain this genus, but this family has since been placed in synonymy with the Tephromelataceae.

== Description ==
Mycoblastus species produce a grayish-white or greenish-gray crustose thallus that contains a green algal photobiont from the genus Trebouxia. The apothecia are typically large, hemmispherical, shiny black or dark pigmented, and lack a margin. There are highly branched and anastomosing paraphyses that form a network around the asci. The asci are lecanoralean (meaning an apothecium containing algae at least below the hypothecium and usually having a distinct amphithecium that often also contains algae) that mostly contain one or two, colorless, thick-walled ascospores.

== Species ==
As of April 2021, Species Fungorum accepts 14 species of Mycoblastus:

- Mycoblastus affinis (Schaer.) T.Schauer (1964) – temperate Northern Hemisphere
- Mycoblastus alpinus (Fr.) Th.Fr. ex Hellb. (1885) – temperate Northern Hemisphere
- Mycoblastus bryophilus Imshaug ex Kantvilas (2009) – Campbell Island; Tasmania
- Mycoblastus caesius (Coppins & P.James) Tønsberg (1992) – temperate oceanic areas of the Northern Hemisphere
- Mycoblastus campbellianus (Nyl.) Zahlbr. (1926) – New Zealand; Tasmania; Campbell Island; Macquarie Island; Australia; Tierra del Fuego; Chile
- Mycoblastus coniophorus (Elix & A.W.Archer) Kantvilas & Elix (2009) – Chile; Juan Fernandez; Auckland Island; Macquarie Island; Prince Edward Island; Tasmania; Australia
- Mycoblastus disporus (C.Knight) Kantvilas (2009) – Tasmania; New Zealand
- Mycoblastus kalioruber Kantvilas (2009) – Tasmania
- Mycoblastus leprarioides Kantvilas & Elix (2009) – Australia
- Mycoblastus oreotropicanus Kantvilas (2016) – Papua New Guinea
- Mycoblastus physodalicus Kantvilas (2016) – Queensland, Australia
- Mycoblastus sanguinarioides Kantvilas (2009) – Tasmania; Australia
- Mycoblastus sanguinarius (L.) Norman (1926) – temperate Northern Hemisphere
- Mycoblastus sinensis Kantvilas (2011) – China

The species once known as Mycoblastus fucatus was transferred into a new genus, Violella, circumscribed in 2011 to contain it and other similar species with Biatora-type asci and unusual pigmentation in the hymenium.
