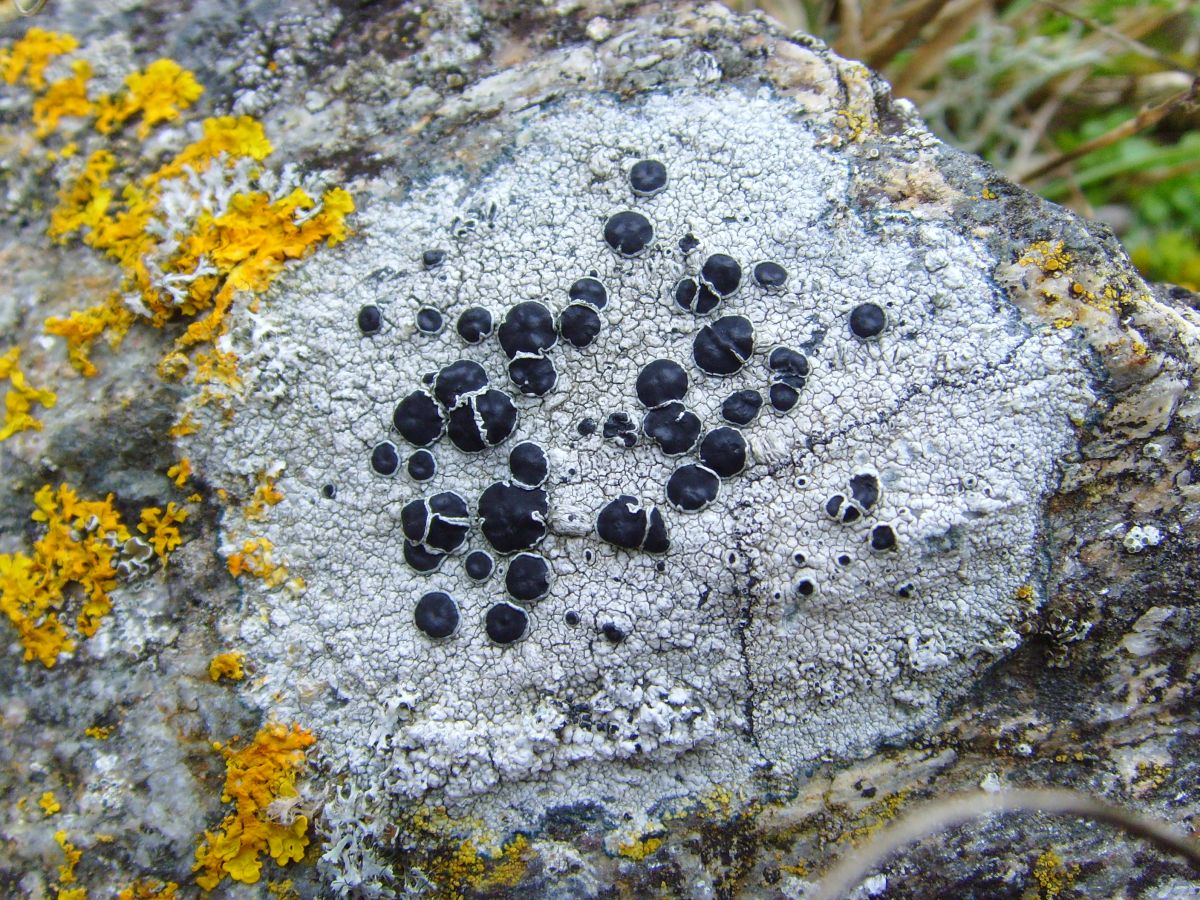
- Tephromela atra

Conservation status
- Secure (NatureServe)

Scientific classification
- Kingdom: Fungi
- Division: Ascomycota
- Class: Lecanoromycetes
- Order: Lecanorales
- Family: Tephromelataceae
- Genus: Tephromela
- Species: T. atra

Binomial name
- Tephromela atra (Huds.) Hafellner ex Kalb (1983)

Varieties
- Tephromela atra var. atra; Tephromela atra var. calcarea; Tephromela atra var. tortuosa

= Tephromela atra =

Species of lichen

Tephromela atra is a species of lichen in the family Tephromelataceae. It has a worldwide distribution.

== Synonyms ==
Tephromela atra has many synonym since many previously described species have been reclassified as T. atra. These include Lecanora atra, Lecidea atroides, Lichen ater, Parmelia atra, Patellaria atra, Psora atra, Rinodina atra, Scutellaria atra and Verrucaria atra.
