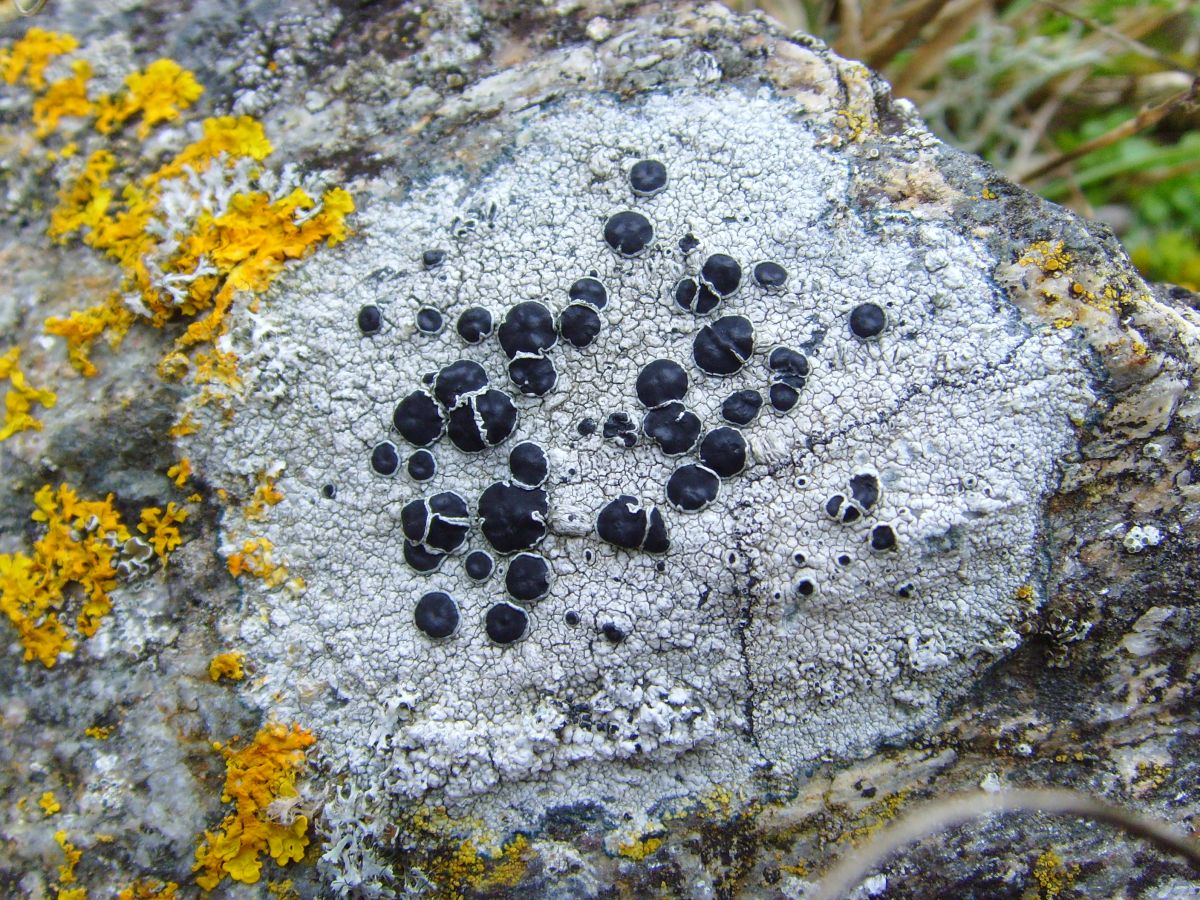
- Tephromela atra

Scientific classification
- Domain: Eukaryota
- Kingdom: Fungi
- Division: Ascomycota
- Class: Lecanoromycetes
- Order: Lecanorales
- Family: Tephromelataceae
- Genus: Tephromela; M.Choisy (1929)

Type species
- Tephromela atra (Huds.) Hafellner (1983)

= Tephromela =

Genus of lichens

Tephromela is a genus of lichens in the family Tephromelataceae. There are about 50 species in this widespread genus. The genus was established in 1929 by the French lichenologist Maurice Choisy, who separated these species from the broader genus Lecanora based on their distinctive straight asexual spores and dark violet spore-bearing layers. These rock and bark-dwelling lichens are characterized by their white to pale grey crusty growth and black disc-shaped reproductive structures with purple-tinted interiors.

== Taxonomy ==
The genus was circumscribed in 1929 by the French lichenologist Maurice Choisy. He assigned Tephromela atra as the type species. In his original description, Choisy established Tephromela to accommodate species that had previously been classified under Lecanora but had distinctive characteristics that set them apart from the core Lecanora group. Specifically, he recognized that Lecanora atra (originally described by Acharius) represented a distinct evolutionary line within what was then broadly conceived as the family Lecanoraceae. Choisy characterized the new genus by its consistently straight pycnoconidia (asexual spores) and its entirely black-violet hymenium (the spore-bearing layer), features that distinguished it from other Lecanora species. He noted that this species had previously been known as Patellaria tephromelas in earlier literature, reflecting its distinctive dark colouration. The genus name Tephromela itself references this characteristic dark pigmentation.

This taxonomic decision was part of Choisy's broader systematic revision of the Lecanoraceae, in which he argued for subdividing the artificially broad genus Lecanora into smaller, more natural groups based on detailed morphological and reproductive characters. His approach emphasized the taxonomic importance of previously overlooked features like pycnoconidia structure and hymenium coloration in establishing evolutionary relationships within lichen-forming fungi.

== Description ==
Tephromela lichens form crusts that adhere firmly to the rock or bark they colonise. The surface is usually white to pale grey and may look glossy, cracked into tiny angular islands (areoles) or dotted with low warts; dark grey–black powdery soredia sometimes blanket the thallus and mute its base colour. A thin, dark prothallus line is occasionally visible between the areoles, marking where the colony advances. Microscopy reveals a layer of green algal cells 6–18 μm across (the photobiont) embedded in a colourless fungal medulla that shows no iodine staining reaction (I–).

Reproductive bodies appear as black discs (apothecia) that begin sunken in the crust but soon sit flush or slightly raised. Each disc retains a rim of thallus tissue (the thalline margin), while the true exciple—the inner cup wall found in many other lichens—is reduced to a thin, often barely perceptible layer. Chemical pigments give the spore-bearing layer a lilac to purple colour that turns bright red in a drop of sodium hypochlorite (the N test); a similar hue coats the tops of the slender paraphyses that thread the hymenium. Beneath lies a pale ochre to brown hypothecium. Asci are of the Bacidia-type and contain eight colourless ascospores that are ellipsoid, lack cross-walls (septa and have comparatively thick walls but no outer gelatinous sheath.

Minute flask-shaped pycnidia embedded in the crust release straight, colourless conidia that range from stubby rods to fine threads. Chemically the genus is varied: many species deposit atranorin or lichexanthone in the cortex and store an assortment of depsidone acids in the medulla. Tephromela is distinguished from superficially similar genera by its persistent thalline margin, purple-violet hymenium, poorly developed exciple, Bacidia-type asci and chain-forming conidiogenous cells.

== Species ==
- Tephromela alectoronica Kalb (2008)
- Tephromela antarctica Øvstedal (2001)
- Tephromela arafurensis Rambold (1989)
- Tephromela atra (Huds.) Hafellner (1983)
- Tephromela atrocaesia (Nyl. ex Cromb.) Fryday (2011)
- Tephromela atroviolacea (Flot.) Fryday (2011)
- Tephromela austrolitoralis (Zahlbr.) Kalb & Elix (2008)
- Tephromela baudiniana Kantvilas & Elix (2017) – Australia
- Tephromela bourgeanica Elix (2013)
- Tephromela buelliana (Müll.Arg.) Kalb (2004)
- Tephromela bullata Elix (2012)
- Tephromela bunyana Kalb & Elix (2004)
- Tephromela connivens (Müll.Arg.) Kalb (2007)
- Tephromela disciformis Øvstedal (2001)
- Tephromela disjuncta Elix (2012)
- Tephromela erosa Elix (2013)
- Tephromela eviolacea Haldeman & McCune (2021)
- Tephromela follmannii Pérez-Vargas, Hern.-Padr. & Elix (2010)
- Tephromela gigantea Kalb & Elix (2004)
- Tephromela globularis (Kremp.) Lumbsch, Kalb & Elix (2004)
- Tephromela granularis Kantvilas (2015)
- Tephromela grumosa (Pers.) Hafellner & Cl.Roux (1985)
- Tephromela immersa Kalb & Elix (2004)
- Tephromela isidiosa Kalb & Elix (2004)
- Tephromela korundensis (Räsänen) Kalb (2004)
- Tephromela lignicola Orange & Fryday (2019) – Falkland Islands
- Tephromela lillipillensis Elix (2012)
- Tephromela lirellina (Darb.) Fryday (2011)
- Tephromela lucifraga Øvstedal & Tønsberg (2009)
- Tephromela lucifuga Øvstedal (2009)
- Tephromela matogrossensis Kalb & Elix (2004)
- Tephromela minor Øvstedal (2001)
- Tephromela neobunyana Elix (2013)
- Tephromela nothofagi Elix (2013) – Australia
- Tephromela olivetorica Elix (2012)
- Tephromela pacifica Björk & Muggia (2016)
- Tephromela parasitica Øvstedal & Søchting (2004)
- Tephromela pertusarioides (Degel.) Hafellner & Cl. Roux (1985)
- Tephromela physodica Kalb (2008)
- Tephromela priestleyi (C.W. Dodge) Øvstedal (2009)
- Tephromela promontorii (Zahlbr.) Kalb (2007)
- Tephromela rhizophorae Kalb (2008)
- Tephromela rimosula Øvstedal (2010)
- Tephromela skottsbergii (Darb.) Fryday (2011)
- Tephromela sorediata Kalb & Elix (2006)
- Tephromela stenosporonica Elix & Kalb (2006)
- Tephromela superba Fryday (2011)
- Tephromela territoriensis Elix & Kalb (2008)
- Tephromela variabilis Øvstedal (2001)
