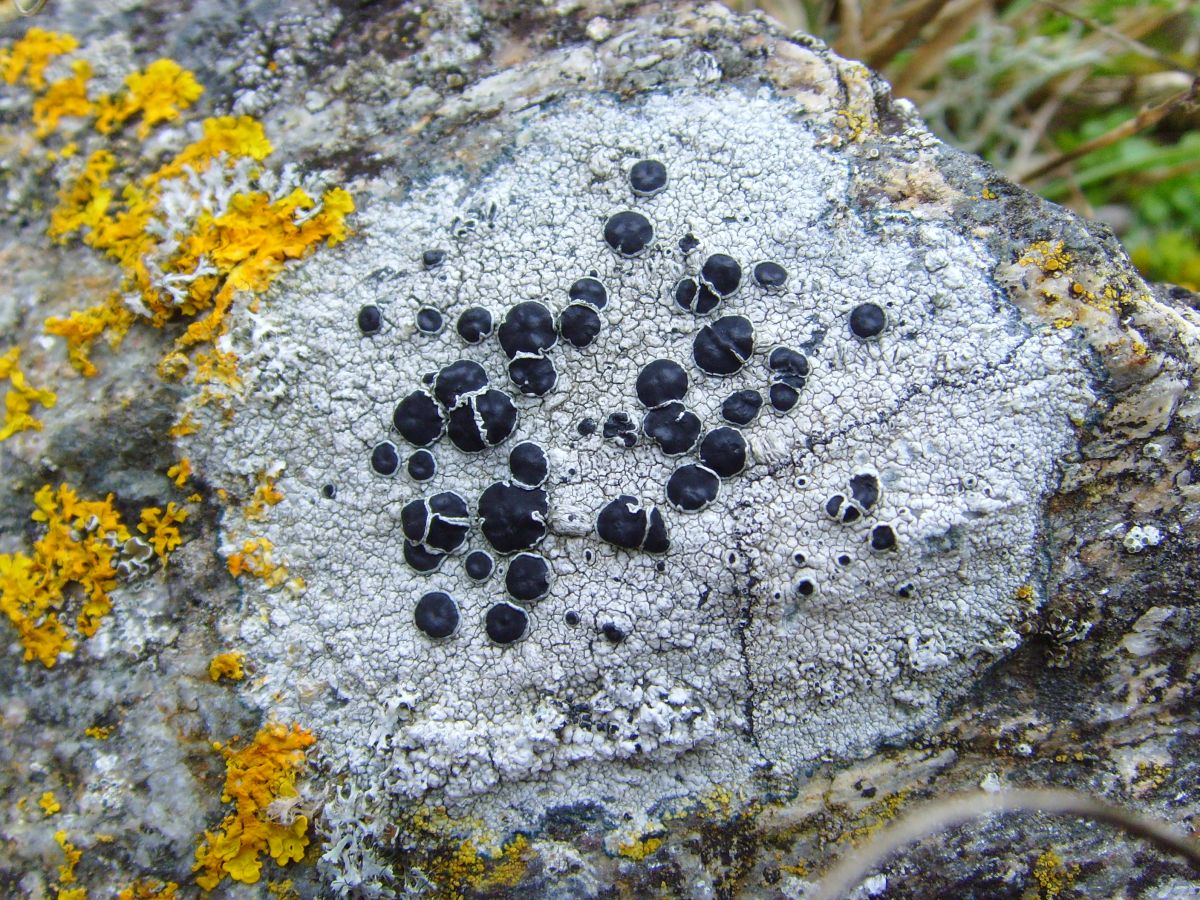
- Tephromela atra found in France

Scientific classification
- Kingdom: Fungi
- Division: Ascomycota
- Class: Lecanoromycetes
- Order: Lecanorales
- Family: Tephromelataceae; Hafellner (1984)

Type genus
- Tephromela M.Choisy (1929)

Genera
- Calvitimela; Mycoblastus; Tephromela; Violella

Synonyms
- Mycoblastaceae Hafellner (1984)

= Tephromelataceae =

Family of lichens

The Tephromelataceae are a family of lichenized fungi in the order Lecanorales. The family was circumscribed by Austrian lichenologist Josef Hafellner in 1984. Tephromelataceae comprises the genera Tephromela, Calvitimela, Mycoblastus and Violella, which together constitute a well-supported monophyletic group.

== Taxonomy ==
The family Mycoblastaceae, proposed by the German lichenologist Josef Hafellner to contain the genus Mycoblastus, was also published in the same 1984 publication; it was later placed into synonymy with Tephromelataceae. The latter name takes precedence because of its first adopted use.

== Description ==
Tephromelataceae lichens typically form a crustose (crust-like) thallus. They mostly engage in a symbiotic relationship with chlorococcoid green algae, specifically from the genus Trebouxia, to form lichenised structures; instances of them living on other lichens (lichenicolous) are rare.

The reproductive structures of Tephromelataceae lichens, called ascomata, are predominantly apotheciate, meaning they have an open, saucer-like structure. This family has two main types of apotheciate ascomata: the lecanorine type, found in the genera Calvitimela and Tephromela, which have a margin similar in colour and texture to the thallus; and the lecideine type, present in Mycoblastus and Violella, characterised by a margin that is different from the thallus.

The internal structure of these reproductive bodies (the hamathecium) consists of paraphyses, which are filament-like cells that can be simple or branched and often pigmented. These structures typically have an amyloid reaction, meaning they change colour when stained with iodine. The asci, which are the spore-bearing cells, are semifissitunicate, possessing a special double-layered structure. These asci have a unique amyloid apical tholus (a dome-like structure at the top of the ascus) with amyloid walls, and contain a pale central area and a darker top.

Spore production varies within this family; each ascus typically contains eight spores, but this can be reduced to just one or two. These spores are ellipsoid in shape, hyaline (translucent), and do not react to amyloid staining. For asexual reproduction, Tephromelataceae lichens produce pycnidia, which are small, flask-shaped structures that release simple, rod-like to thread-like spores called conidia.

The chemical makeup of these lichens is diverse, including compounds like depsides (e.g., atranorin), depsidones, dibenzofurans, fatty acids, and lichexanthone.

== Genera ==
As of January 2024, Species Fungorum (in the Catalogue of Life) include 4 genera and 74 accepted species in the family Tephromelataceae. Following the genus name is the taxonomic authority, year of publication, and the number of species:

- Calvitimela Hafellner (2001) – 11 spp.
- Mycoblastus Norman (1852) – 12 spp.
- Tephromela M.Choisy (1929) – 49 spp.
- Violella T.Sprib. (2011) – 2 spp.
