= Toensbergia blastidiata =

Scientific classification
- Domain: Eukaryota
- Kingdom: Fungi
- Division: Ascomycota
- Class: Lecanoromycetes
- Order: Rhizocarpales
- Family: Sporastatiaceae
- Genus: Toensbergia
- Species: T. blastidiata

Binomial name
- Toensbergia blastidiata T.Sprib. & Tønsberg (2020)

Species of lichen

Toensbergia blastidiata is a species of crustose lichen in the family Sporastatiaceae. Described in 2020 from specimens collected in Glacier Bay National Park and Preserve, this bark-dwelling lichen is widespread across northwestern North America from Alaska to Washington State. It is distinctive for producing coral-like clusters of powdery reproductive structures called blastidia, and dried specimens often turn pink due to the oxidation of a lichen product called alectorialic acid.

== Taxonomy ==
The lichen was described as a new species in 2020 by the lichenologists Toby Spribille and Tor Tønsberg. The type specimen was collected in Glacier Bay National Park and Preserve at the base of Marble Mountain (Alaska). Here the lichen was found growing on the bark of Alnus viridis subsp. crispa. The specific epithet blastidiata refers to the "blastidiate thallus surface"; blastidia are vegetative propagules containing both mycobiont and photobiont, which are produced by yeast-like "budding".

== Description ==
Toensbergia blastidiata is a bark-dwelling (corticolous) crust that sits directly on the surface of the bark rather than sinking into it (episubstratal). At first it appears as tiny, rounded, cream-colored islands (areoles) about 0.3 mm across, each slightly domed and pinched at the base. These early areoles soon start to shed powdery outgrowths called blastidia—compact balls of intertwined fungal and algal cells that serve as ready-made propagules. As blastidia proliferate the areoles expand, lose their neat outlines, and merge with neighbors to form irregular sheets that can cover a decimeter or more of bark. In well-developed patches the crust may crack, producing larger, flat secondary areoles up to 2 mm wide and nearly 0.8 mm tall. Fresh material is pale cream, but in the herbarium it often blushes pink because the lichen product alectorialic acid oxidizes on exposure.

Under a dissecting microscope the surface looks minutely coral-like: individual blastidia are more or less spherical (globose to pad-shaped (sometimes reminiscent of prickly-pear cactus joints, hence "opuntioid") and reach 60 micrometres (μm) in width. Each is ringed by a jacket of rounded fungal cells 5–7 × 5–6 μm, and occasional bluish dots may represent bits of the dark mat (hypothallus) that have been lifted upward as the lichen grows. The hypothallus itself forms a thin, usually bluish-gray fringe visible between areoles and around the thallus edge. No distinct medulla has been found. The photosynthetic partner (photobiont) is a green alga with nearly spherical cells up to 15 μm across.

Routine chemical spot tests help confirm the species in the field: the reagent PD turns the thallus yellow and the C test flashes red, reactions that match the presence of alectorialic acid (and one or more related "satellite" compounds) detected by thin-layer chromatography. Alectorialic acid is the same substance that causes the rose tint in dried material.

== Habitat and distribution ==
Toensbergia blastidiata is widespread in northwestern North America with a range extending from Kodiak Island south to the Olympic Mountains of Washington State. It is a corticolous lichen that has been recorded from the bark of Alnus viridis subsp. crispa, A. incana subsp. tenuifolia, A. rubra, Frangula purshiana, Malus fusca, and Pinus contorta.
