= Fulgidea =

Scientific classification
- Domain: Eukaryota
- Kingdom: Fungi
- Division: Ascomycota
- Class: Lecanoromycetes
- Order: Umbilicariales
- Family: Umbilicariaceae
- Genus: Fulgidea; Bendiksby & Timdal (2013)

Type species
- Fulgidea oligospora (Timdal) Bendiksby & Timdal (2013)

Species
- F. oligospora F. sierrae

Genus of lichens

Fulgidea is a genus of lichen-forming fungi in the family Umbilicariaceae. It has two species of squamulose lichens that grow on bark and on wood.

== Taxonomy ==
The genus was circumscribed in 2013 by the Norwegian lichenologists Mika Bendiksby and Einar Timdal. They assigned Fulgidea oligospora as the type species. The genus name Fulgidea is derived from the Latin word fulgur, meaning "lightning", alluding to its preference for growing on burnt wood. The name also reflects its morphological similarities to species within the genus Lecidea. Both species of Fulgidea had previously been classified in the genus Hypocenomyce.

== Description ==
Genus Fulgidea is characterized by its squamulose thallus, which is closely attached or slightly raised and oriented against gravity. The thallus ranges in color from greyish-green to dark brown and can have either a dull or shiny appearance. It lacks a pruinose coating (a fine powdery surface layer that sometimes appears frosted) and does not have a hypothallus, which is an underlying layer of hyphae that can sometimes be visible at the lichen's periphery.

The apothecia (fruiting bodies) of Fulgidea are black, flat, and maintain a distinct margin. They lack a pruinose covering. The exciple, which is the tissue surrounding the apothecium, is made up of tightly bonded, relatively thin-walled hyphae that are ellipsoid to shortly cylindrical in shape. The inner parts and rim of the exciple are blackish brown, and the pigment partially dissolves in potassium hydroxide solution (K) resulting in a brown coloration, but does not react to nitrogen tests (N−). The epihymenium—the uppermost layer of cells in the apothecium—is brown and contains amorphous substances that also dissolve to release a brown effusion when treated with K.

The ascus (spore-bearing structure) is narrowly rhombic with an amyloid cap at the tip. The amyloid reaction is a staining reaction used to identify certain chemical properties of lichen tissues. The cap includes a small, amyloid tholus—a structure within the ascus tip—with a non-amyloid central plug. Pycnidia, which are asexual reproductive structures, have brown walls. The pycnoconidia (asexual spores), are rod-shaped, measuring 7–10 μm in length and about 1 μm in width.

Chemically, Fulgidea species contain alectorialic and thamnolic acids, which are secondary metabolites (lichen products) specific to certain lichens and contribute to their biochemical characteristics.

== Comparison to similar genera ==
The genus Fulgidea is primarily distinguished from Hypocenomyce by its exciple structure. In Hypocenomyce, the exciple is colorless internally and green at the rim (K−, N+ violet), and is only partially conglutinated with hyphae separated by lecanoric acid crystals (C+ red). Additionally, Hypocenomyce features a green epihymenium and pycnidium wall that react positively to violet staining with N and contains lecanoric acid, unlike Fulgidea which lacks amorphous substances. The pycnoconidia in Hypocenomyce are generally longer, ranging from bacilliform to filiform in shape.

Contrasting with Pycnora, Fulgidea has an ascus that is narrowly rhombic with an amyloid cap and a small amyloid tholus with a non-amyloid central plug, whereas Pycnora has a broadly clavate (club-shaped) ascus without an amyloid cap but with a well-developed, amyloid tholus and a deeper amyloid area along the wall. Additionally, Pycnora has a strictly crustose thallus and a green epihymenium that turns violet with N and dissolves in K, with shorter pycnoconidia that are more or less spherical to shortly bacilliform. Elixia, another genus, differs from Fulgidea as it forms a crustose or endoxylic thallus, with star-shaped to lirelloid apothecia, capitate paraphyses with a distinct pigment zone at the top of the apical cell, and lacks secondary compounds. Xylopsora, another genus in the Umbilicariaceae, is morphologically, anatomically and ecologically similar to Fulgidea and differs mainly in secondary chemistry: it contains friesiic acid rather than alectorialic and thamnolic acids.

== Species ==
- Fulgidea oligospora (Timdal) Bendiksby & Timdal (2013) – Arizona, USA; Sakha Republic, Russia
- Fulgidea sierrae (Timdal) Bendiksby & Timdal (2013) – California, USA
