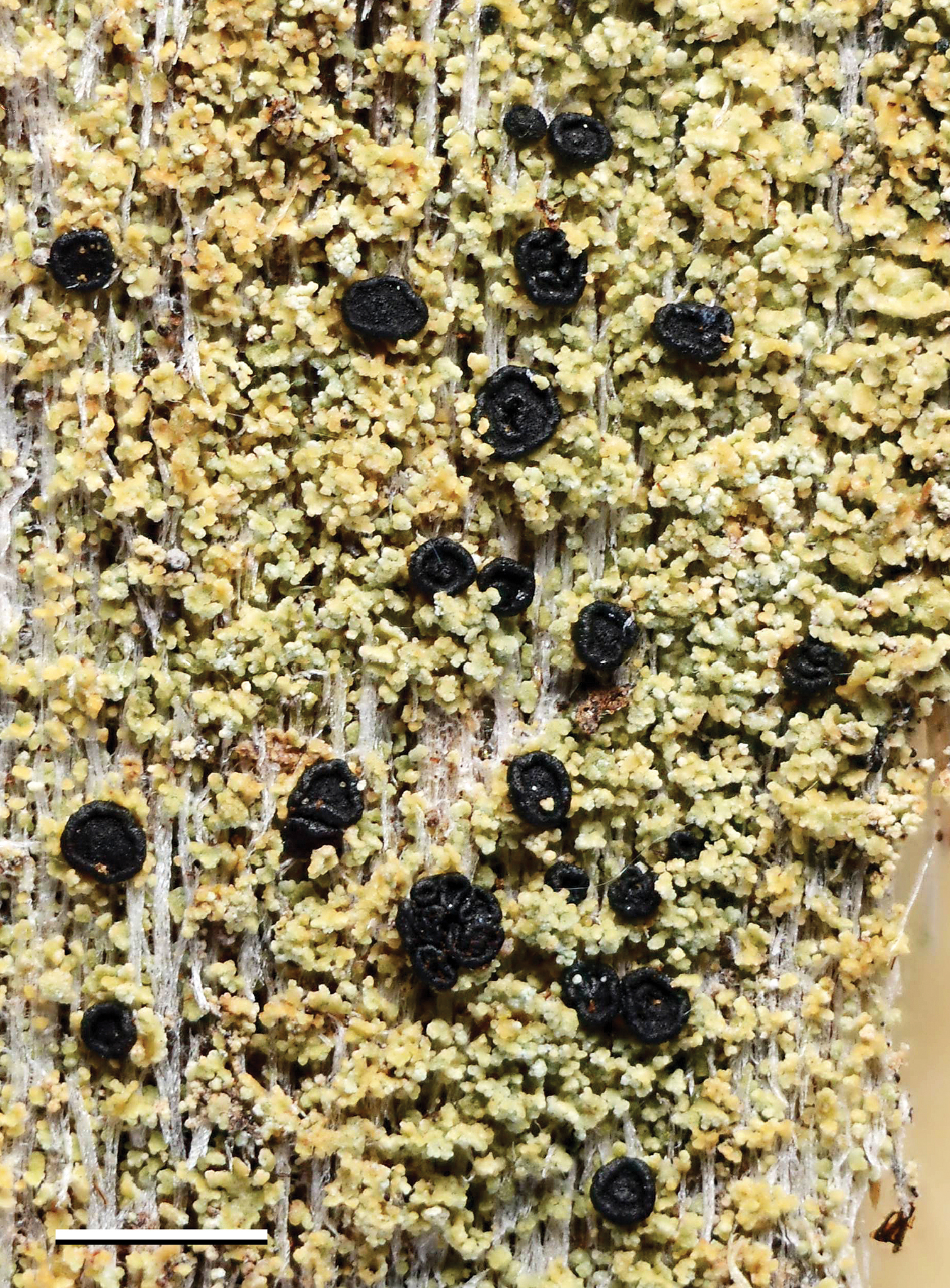
- Xylopsora canopeorum

Scientific classification
- Kingdom: Fungi
- Division: Ascomycota
- Class: Lecanoromycetes
- Order: Umbilicariales
- Family: Umbilicariaceae
- Genus: Xylopsora; Bendiksby & Timdal (2013)

Type species
- Xylopsora friesii (Ach.) Bendiksby & Timdal (2013)

Species
- X. canopeorum X. caradocensis X. diffissa X. friesii

= Xylopsora =

Genus of lichens

Xylopsora is a genus of lichen-forming fungi, belonging to the family Umbilicariaceae. The genus was established in 2013 when genetic studies showed that several scale-forming (squamulose) lichens previously grouped together were not actually closely related. Species of Xylopsora typically grow on wood, especially old or fire-scarred timber, in forests of the Northern Hemisphere. The genus includes four recognized species, some of which were only recently discovered growing high in tree canopies or detected through environmental DNA techniques.

== Taxonomy ==
Xylopsora was introduced in 2013 by Mika Bendiksby and Einar Timdal as part of a molecular phylogenetics-informed re-assessment of the mixed bag then called Hypocenomyce sensu lato (in the "wide sense"). Using three ribosomal DNA regions and a broad sample of Lecanoromycetes lichens, they showed that Hypocenomyce in the wide sense was an artificial, polyphyletic grouping—i.e., species that look and live alike but do not share a single recent common ancestor. One of the recovered lineages was the "H. friesii group", which formed its own clade distinct from the core Hypocenomyce and from other look-alikes that grow on burnt wood. To give that clade a proper name, they erected Xylopsora and transferred two species to it as new combinations: X. friesii (type) and X. caradocensis. In their cladogram, the Xylopsora clade resolves next to foliose umbilicarioid lichens.

On phylogenetic grounds the authors placed Xylopsora in the family Umbilicariaceae (order Umbilicariales. They also formalised the subclass Umbilicariomycetidae). That decision broadened the family concept—traditionally dominated by foliose genera such as Umbilicaria and Lasallia—to include crustose to squamulose forms like Xylopsora. In their phylogenetic trees, Xylopsora comes out as sister to a clade of Lasallia + Umbilicaria, indicating that the small, brown, wood-dwelling, scale-forming thalli seen in several "burnt-wood" lichens have evolved more than once. The same study also clarified nearby problems: the superficially similar Hypocenomyce isidiosa proved unrelated and was moved to Xylographa (Trapeliaceae), and other "Hypocenomyce" elements were reassigned to Fulgidea or to carbonicolous lineages in Lecanorales. Together these changes explain why Xylopsora is treated as a segregate genus rather than left inside a broadly defined Hypocenomyce.

Bendiksby and Timdal provided a formal generic diagnosis and etymology for Xylopsora (xýlon, 'wood'; reflecting its frequent occurrence on timber), and they distinguished it from closely similar genera on a combination of fruiting body anatomy and chemistry rather than outward look alone. In brief, Xylopsora has black, flat apothecia (the spore-bearing discs), a particular ascus structure with an amyloid cap, and typically produces friesiic (± confriesiic) acids—features that, in combination, separate it from Fulgidea, Hypocenomyce sensu stricto, and Pycnora despite their convergent brown, scale-like thalli on charred wood.

== Description ==
Xylopsora forms small, scaly patches (a squamulose thallus) that sit flat and tightly attached to the surface or become slightly blistered; the colour ranges from grey-green to dark brown and the surface can be dull or shiny. The thallus lacks a powdery bloom (it is epruinose) and does not develop a pale marginal border layer (no hypothallus). The spore-producing discs (apothecia) are black, flat, and keep a clear rim; they are often gyrose, meaning the disc surface shows fine concentric folds.

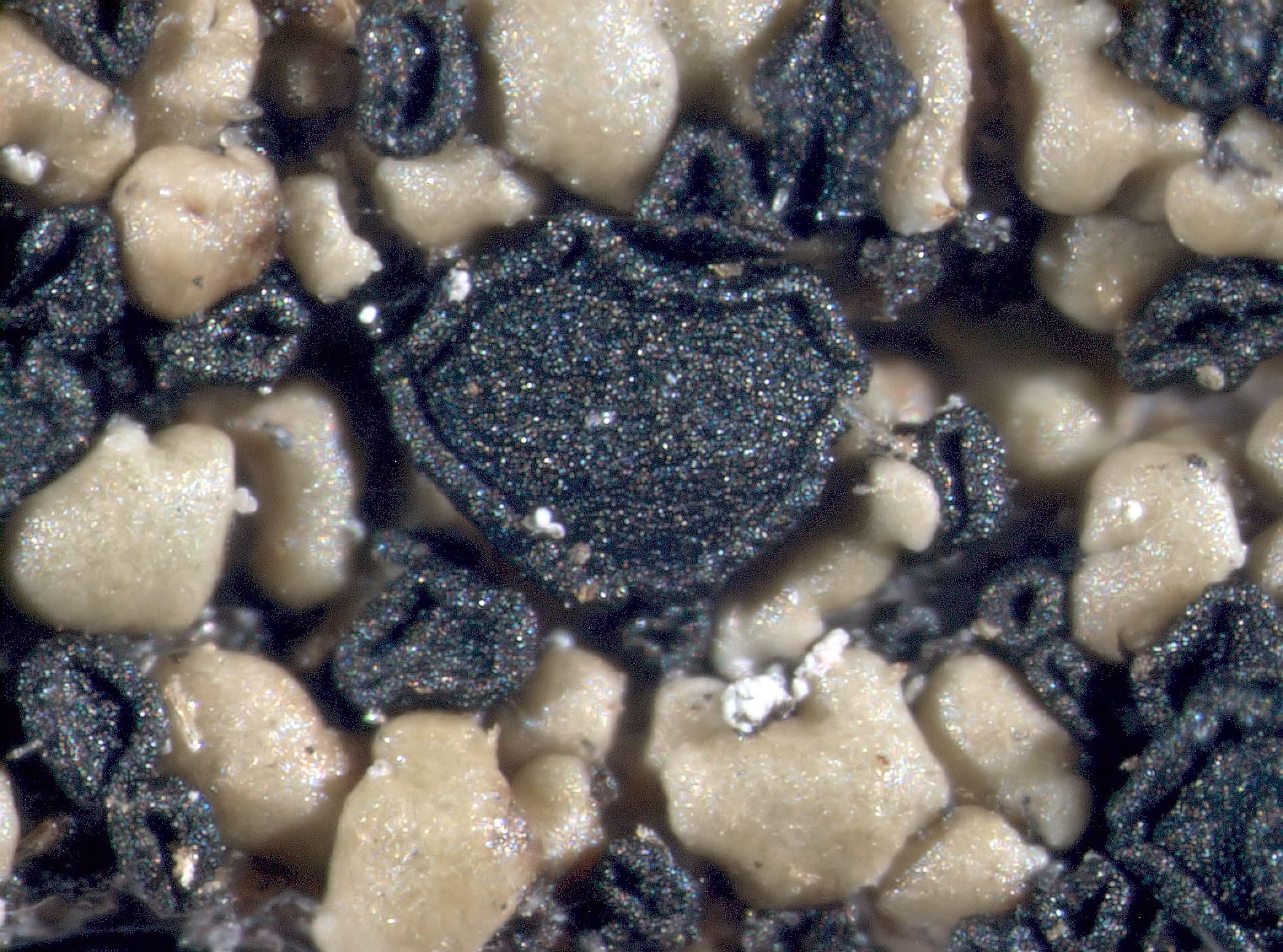
Closeup of the apothecium of Xylopsora friesii

In section, the apothecial rim (exciple) is built of tightly glued-together, thin-walled fungal threads; its inner portion and edge are blackish-brown. The pigments partly dissolve in the standard lichen K test (producing a brown flush) and there is no reaction in the N test; crystals are absent. The uppermost film over the spore layer (epihymenium) is similarly brown, also K+ (brown) and N−. The spore sacs (asci) are narrow-rhombic and bear a starch-like amyloid cap that stains blue in iodine; the cap sits over a small amyloid dome (tholus) with a non-amyloid central plug—features that place Xylopsora with other Umbilicariaceae showing this ascus type.

Asexual propagules are produced in brown-walled pycnidia; these give off very small, narrowly ellipsoid to short rod-shaped conidia measuring 2.5–5 × about 1 μm. Chemically, Xylopsora characteristically contains friesiic acid as the major compound, sometimes with traces of confriesiic acid. These features also help separate Xylopsora from its closest look-alikes: it resembles Fulgidea, but has smaller conidia and a different chemical profile (friesiic acid rather than alectorialic and thamnolic acids).

== Habitat and distribution ==
As presently circumscribed, Xylopsora comprises wood-dwelling lichens that most often colonise bark and timber—frequently old or fire-scarred wood—in boreal and temperate forests of the Northern Hemisphere. The type species X. friesii is widespread in these regions and typically occurs on charred stumps or weathered wood in conifer forests. X. caradocensis is recorded from northern and western Europe, with material from Norway and the British Isles, and it occupies similar wood-based habitats.

Two additional species broaden the ecological picture of the genus: X. canopeorum was described from the crowns of coast redwood (Sequoia sempervirens) in California, where it forms small patches high in the canopy, and X. diffissa was detected through environmental DNA (eDNA) sampling of epiphytic (plant-dwelling) lichens in Czech forests and described with eDNA evidence used to characterise its ecology and distribution. Together, the canopy discovery and eDNA detections indicate that Xylopsora includes overlooked microlichens and that traditional ground-based surveys likely under-record the genus and its range.

== Species ==
- Xylopsora canopeorum Timdal, Reese Næsborg & Bendiksby (2018)
- Xylopsora caradocensis (Leight. ex Nyl.) Bendiksby & Timdal (2013)
- Xylopsora diffissa Vondrák, Šoun, S.Svoboda, Malíček, Palice & Timdal (2024)
- Xylopsora friesii (Ach.) Bendiksby & Timdal (2013)
