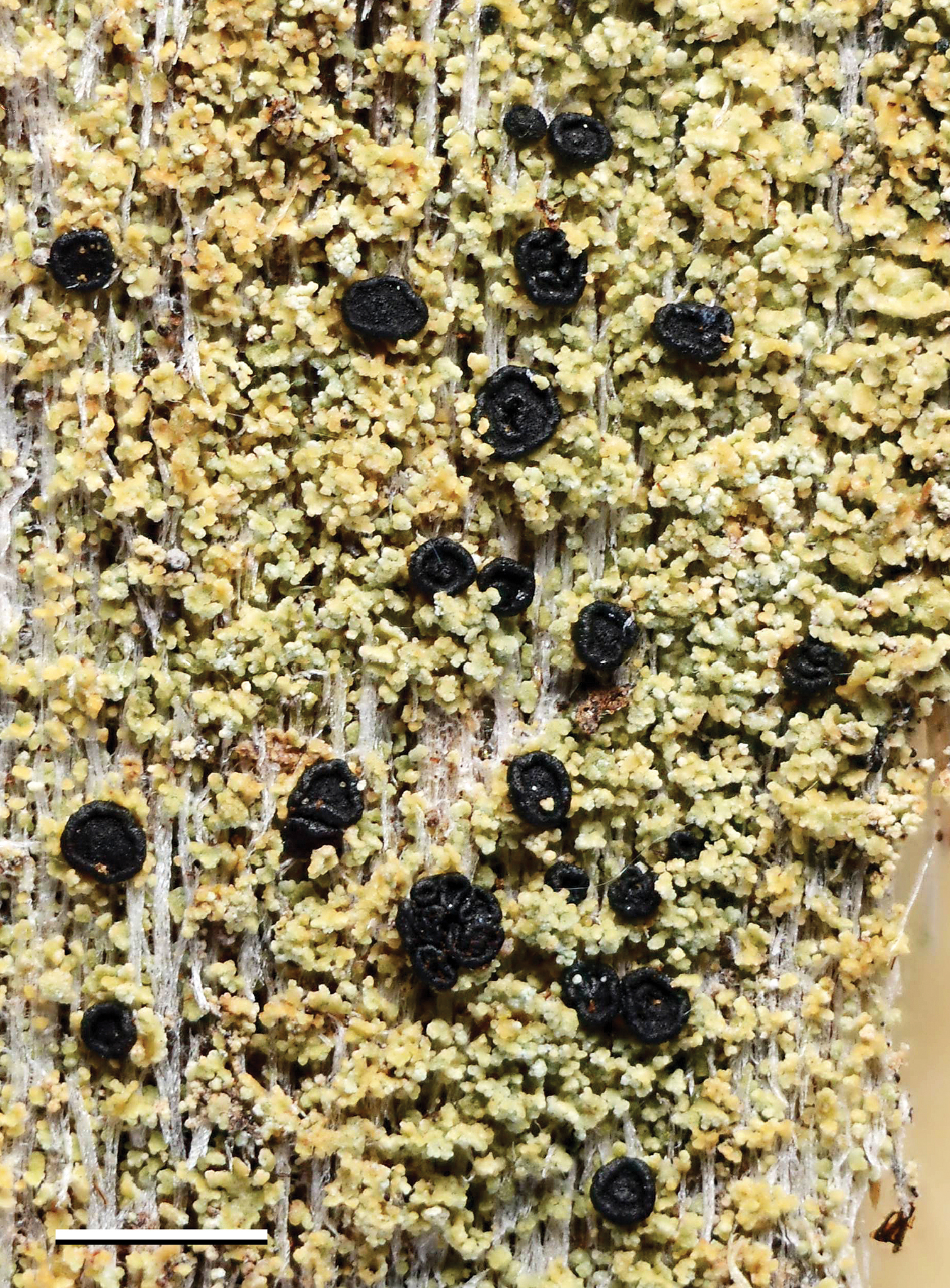
- Scale bar: 1 mm

Conservation status
- Endangered (IUCN 3.1)

Scientific classification
- Kingdom: Fungi
- Division: Ascomycota
- Class: Lecanoromycetes
- Order: Umbilicariales
- Family: Umbilicariaceae
- Genus: Xylopsora
- Species: X. canopeorum

Binomial name
- Xylopsora canopeorum Timdal, Reese Næsborg & Bendiksby (2018)
- Holotype: Big Basin Redwoods State Park, California, USA

= Xylopsora canopeorum =

Species of lichen

Xylopsora canopeorum is a squamulose (scaly), corticolous (bark-dwelling) lichen species in the family Umbilicariaceae. Discovered in the canopies of Sequoia sempervirens (coast redwoods) in California, United States, it was formally described as new to science in 2018. It is endemic to the central coastal region of California, living within the unique ecosystems of Big Basin Redwoods State Park and Armstrong Redwoods State Natural Reserve, areas known for their ancient coast redwood forests. The lichen evolves from a crust-like to scale-like form, developing into coral-like crusts as it matures, complemented by distinctive flat, black reproductive discs. This species has varying greyish-green to medium brown coloration and occasionally forms soralia, which release powdery reproductive propagules called soredia. Xylopsora canopeorum is distinguished from closely related species by its smaller, partly coral-like squamules (scales), the occurrence of soralia on its surface, and in some specimens, the presence of both thamnolic and friesiic acids within the thallus.

Xylopsora canopeorum was declared endangered by the IUCN in 2021 due to its habitat specialization, severe fragmentation of its range from historic logging, and increased vulnerability to high-intensity wildfires exacerbated by climate change. Conservation efforts are needed for its survival, with accurate knowledge about its distribution hampered by the challenges of accessing the canopy and the need for specialized observation techniques.

== Taxonomy ==
The lichen was first scientifically described in 2018 by the lichenologists Einar Timdal, Mika Bendiksby, and Rikke Reese Næsborg. The type specimen was collected by Bendiksby from Big Basin Redwoods State Park, California, at an elevation of 341 m (1,119 ft); there, it was found growing on the bark of a main trunk of an old Sequoia sempervirens more than 100 cm (40 in) in diameter. The species epithet canopeorum is derived from the species' habitat, specifically highlighting its discovery within the canopies of ancient redwood forests.

Molecular phylogenetics analyses, using sequence alignments derived from both nuclear (ITS and LSU) and mitochondrial (SSU) ribosomal DNA data, have robustly positioned X. canopeorum within the X. caradocensis–X. friesii clade. These conclusions are supported by Bayesian inference, maximum likelihood estimation, and maximum parsimony methods, confirming the species as a distinct evolutionary lineage. To achieve these results, the research incorporated both manual and automated methods for establishing multiple sequence alignments, which are particularly challenging for non-coding DNA regions with variable lengths.

== Description ==
Xylopsora canopeorum has a thallus that ranges from crust-like to scale-like in appearance, with individual scales (squamules) measuring up to 0.5 mm in diameter. These scales often evolve into a coral-like crust as the lichen ages, initially adhering flatly to the surface before standing upright in a manner that seeks the direction of gravity (geotropically imbricate). Sporadically, the lichen forms soralia, structures that release powdery reproductive propagules called soredia, appearing in patches and bearing a bluish hue.

The surface of the thallus shows a color palette ranging from greyish-green to medium brown, with a matte finish. Its edges may be finely notched or cut and are the same color as the rest of the upper surface. The uppermost layer (cortex) of the thallus is relatively thin, reaching up to 15 micrometers (μm), though it typically lacks a well-defined structure.

Reproductive structures (apothecia), which are common in this species, appear as flat, black discs without a powdery coating (epruinose), measuring up to 0.6 mm across. The edges of these discs remain distinct and may either be smooth or somewhat wavy. The supporting structure of the apothecia (exciple) consists of densely packed fungal filaments, darker on the outer rim and lighter towards the center, without crystal formations. The tissue layer beneath the spore-producing layer (hymenium) and the tissue base (hypothecium) share a pale olivaceous brown color, while the very top layer (epihymenium) is dark reddish brown, also devoid of crystals. The spore-producing cells (asci) are club-shaped, approximately 30 μm tall, featuring a thin amyloid structure at the center covered by a cap, containing orange pigment when young.

The spores themselves are ellipsoidal and clear, containing orange pigment when young, measuring 4–7 by 2.5–4.5 μm. Structures known as pycnidia, which would produce asexual spores, have not been observed in this species.

Chemically, X. canopeorum is characterized by the presence of friesiic acid as its major component, with thamnolic acid varying from absent to a minor component. The thallus reacts to certain chemical spot tests, changing color to yellow in the presence of para-phenylenediamine (PD) and potassium hydroxide (K), while it shows a bluish-white fluorescence under ultraviolet light (UV+).

=== Similar species ===
Xylopsora canopeorum has distinctive morphological characteristics when compared to its close relatives X. caradocensis and X. friesii, particularly in the size and development of its squamules. These squamules are smaller in X. canopeorum, typically under 0.5 mm in diameter, and tend to form a coralloid crust or develop into soralia as they mature. In contrast, both X. caradocensis and X. friesii feature squamules that are significantly larger, reaching diameters of up to 1.0 to 1.5 mm, and lack the sorediate formations seen in X. canopeorum.

The texture and orientation of the squamules also vary between these species. X. caradocensis squamules present a bullate (blistered) or irregularly ascending profile, whereas X. friesii's squamules are more uniform, adhering closely to the substrate or slightly ascending. Furthermore, the ascospores of X. caradocensis are longer, ranging from 6.5 to 14 μm in length, and often show one or three septa, distinguishing them from the typically non-septate and shorter ascospores of X. canopeorum, which more closely resemble those of X. friesii in size. Chemically, both X. caradocensis and X. friesii are known to contain only friesiic acid, setting them apart from the possible chemical diversity observed in X. canopeorum.

== Distribution and habitat ==
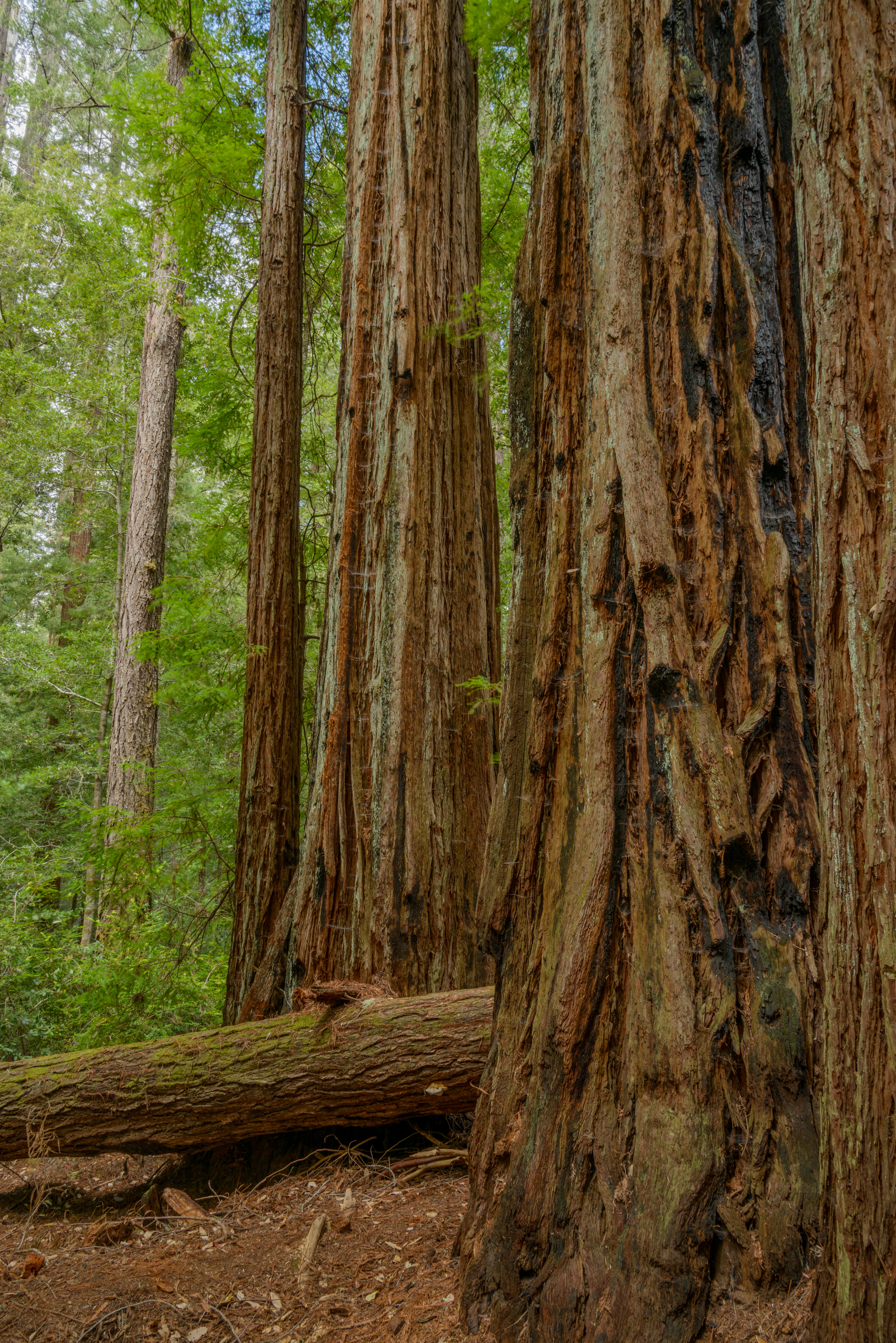
Xylopsora canopeorum grows on the bark of ancient coast redwoods.

Xylopsora canopeorum is exclusively found in the central coastal region of California, with confirmed specimens collected within Big Basin Redwoods State Park and Armstrong Redwoods State Natural Reserve. These locations, situated respectively 11 km (6.8 mi) and 18 km (11 mi) away from the Pacific Ocean, are notable for their ancient coast redwood forests, providing a unique ecosystem for this lichen species. The exploration of forest canopies remains limited, largely due to the challenges and specialized skills and equipment needed to access the treetops. Chaenotheca longispora is another lichen found from a similar location in a California State Park and reported as a new species in 2019.

In terms of its ecological niche, X. canopeorum grows on the coarse and fibrous bark of large coast redwood trees, sometimes extending to charred areas of the bark. This lichen is predominantly found at elevations ranging from 5 to 75 m (16 to 246 ft) above the forest floor, growing on the venerable and robust bark surfaces of the redwoods' main trunks. The presence of Xylopsora canopeorum is often associated with a community of other lichen species, including Carbonicola anthracophila, Fulgidea oligospora, F. sierrae, Hertelidea botryosa, and Hypocenomyce scalaris, which share the surfaces offered by the ancient trees of these old-growth forests.

== Conservation ==
In 2021, Xylopsora canopeorum was assessed by the International Union for Conservation of Nature as an endangered species in its global IUCN Red List. The lichen is facing significant threats primarily due to its specialized habitat in the old-growth coast redwood forests of Northern California. With a natural range that has dwindled to about 5% of its original size due to historic logging, the species' populations are not only severely fragmented but also continually at risk. This fragmentation has been exacerbated by high-intensity wildfires, such as the one in 2020 that affected its type locality, contributing to a decline in both the quality and extent of its habitat. Climate change poses additional threats by increasing the frequency and severity of such wildfires, potentially leading to further losses and extirpation from significant portions of its range, including a potential 97.7% reduction in extent of occurrence and a 33% reduction in area of occurrence if lost from Big Basin Redwoods State Park. Conservation efforts are needed to mitigate the impacts of climate change and protect the remaining old-growth forests where this species resides. Accurate knowledge about Xylopsora canopeorum is hindered by the challenges of accessing its canopy habitat, necessitating specialized climbing for direct observation and collection, which is strictly regulated within State and National Parks. Additionally, exploring other potential hosts within the family Cupressaceae that share similar bark characteristics to the coast redwood could provide new insights into the species' distribution and resilience strategies. Previous surveys on the epiphytic lichens residing in this hard-to-access microhabitat have led to the discovery of new species.
