= Boreoplaca =

Scientific classification
- Kingdom: Fungi
- Division: Ascomycota
- Class: Lecanoromycetes
- Order: Umbilicariales
- Family: Ophioparmaceae
- Genus: Boreoplaca; Timdal (1994)
- Species: B. ultrafrigida

Binomial name
- Boreoplaca ultrafrigida Timdal (1994)
- Holotype: Yakutia, Russia

Synonyms
- Rhizoplacopsis weichingii J.C.Wei & Q.M.Zhou (2006)

Single-species lichen genus

Boreoplaca is a fungal genus in the family Ophioparmaceae. It comprises the single species Boreoplaca ultrafrigida, a saxicolous (rock-dwelling), squamulose lichen. Both the genus and species were described in 1994 by the Norwegian lichenologist Einar Timdal. The lichen is found in Eastern Siberia, the Russian Far East as well as in adjacent territories of north-east China, and in South Korea. The main characteristics of the lichen are its squamulose thallus, black lecideine apothecia, and Fuscidea-type asci.

== Systematics ==
The type specimen of Boreoplaca ultrafrigida was collected from the Ojmyakonskii region of Yakutia in Russia at an elevation of 500 to 600 m (1,600 to 2,000 ft). The lichen is known to occur in a few localities near in Yakutia's Indigirka river valley, where it grows on steep, sun-exposed boulder faces. Other lichens that were found growing near the type specimen were Anamylopsora pulcherrima, Dimelaena oreina, Rhizocarpon renneri, Rhizocarpon subdiscrepans, and Umbilicaria muhlenbergii.

Boreoplaca ultrafrigida was previously known as Rhizoplacopsis weichingii, which was described in 2006 but later found to be synonymous. The family Rhizoplacopsidaceae was initially created for this species, but its familial placement is now considered uncertain.

The species shows morphological similarities to Lecidea sect. Psora, while its ascus type resembles that of the Hypocenomyce friesii-complex and the H. scalaris-complex. Molecular phylogenetics analyses support its placement in the order Umbilicariales.

Timdal initially tentatively suggested a placement in the family Biatoraceae. The amyloid reaction pattern of the ascus tips in Boreoplaca is considered taxonomically significant, with the presence of amyloid asci exhibiting a strongly amyloid dome supporting its relationship with Ophioparma and potential inclusion in Ophioparmaceae.

== Description ==
Boreoplaca ultrafrigida is a lichen characterised by a squamiform (scale-like) thallus, which grows in irregular rosette patterns, often expanding along cracks in the substrate. The thallus can reach up to 4 cm in length and 1.5 cm in width. The individual squamules (small, scale-like lobes of the thallus) are initially closely attached to the surface but soon elongate and develop lobes, with each squamule measuring up to 5 mm in diameter. The upper surface of the thallus is medium brown, smooth to slightly wrinkled or cracked, and lacks any powdery coating (pruina). The margins and underside are black, and the lichen is anchored to its substrate by rhizines, which are specialised root-like structures.

The upper cortex, the outermost layer of the thallus, is 50–75 μm thick and pale brown. It is composed of thin-walled hyphae (fungal filaments) that are arranged mostly perpendicular to the surface. These hyphae contain crystals that dissolve in potassium hydroxide solution (K) and are C+ (red). Beneath the upper cortex lies the photobiont layer, which is 50–100 μm thick and contains unicellular green algae, Trebouxia, that are up to 15 μm in diameter. These algae form a symbiotic relationship with the fungal partner, providing it with nutrients through photosynthesis.

The medulla, the internal tissue of the thallus, is loosely organised with thin-walled hyphae, similar to those in the upper cortex but lacking crystals and not reacting to standard chemical tests (PD−, K−, C−). The lower cortex, up to 40 μm thick, is dark greenish-black and lacks any crystals.

The apothecia (fruiting bodies) are lecideine (with a black, non-powdery surface) and can be up to 2 mm in diameter. They are black, dull, and aggregated along the margins of the squamules in the central part of the thallus, becoming angular in shape. The disc of the apothecia is slightly concave to slightly convex, with a thick, persistent margin. The excipulum, or outer edge of the apothecia, is annulate (ring-like) and composed of radiating hyphae, with an olivaceous-black rim that turns greener in potassium hydroxide.

Inside the apothecia, the hymenium (fertile layer) is 40–50 μm high and does not contain crystals or oil droplets. It is amyloid, meaning it reacts with iodine, and is overlaid by a greenish-black epithecium, which turns brighter green in potassium hydroxide. The paraphyses (sterile filaments) are weakly conglutinated (stuck together), unbranched or minimally branched, and thin-walled, with green granules incrusting their surface. The asci (spore-producing sacs) are small, clavate (club-shaped), about 40 by 10 μm at maturity, and contain eight colourless, simple, broadly ellipsoid to nearly spherical spores, measuring 5–7 by 3.5–4.5 μm.

The lichen also has pycnidia, which are small, flask-shaped structures embedded in the thallus that produce asexual spores called conidia. These pycnidia have a slightly protruding, greenish-black pore and are filled with crystals that dissolve in potassium hydroxide. The conidia are bifusiform (spindle-shaped at both ends) and measure 4–5.5 by approximately 1 μm.

Chemically, Boreoplaca ultrafrigida contains lecanoric acid, a secondary metabolite typical of many lichens.

== Distribution and habitat ==
Beyond its type locality in Yakutia, B. ultrafrigida has been found in several other regions of Russia, including Buryatia, Magadan Oblast, and Primorsky Krai. The species has also been recorded in Jilin province, China, which represents its southernmost known location. In 2018, it was rerported from Prov. Gangwon-do in South Korea, growing on rocks at elevation from 1000 to 1600 metres.

Boreoplaca ultrafrigida shows a preference for various habitats, including open Larix forests, open rock outcrops among taiga forests, and can be found at elevations ranging from 600 to 2000 metres.
