= Hypocenomyce tinderryensis =

Scientific classification
- Domain: Eukaryota
- Kingdom: Fungi
- Division: Ascomycota
- Class: Lecanoromycetes
- Order: Umbilicariales
- Family: Ophioparmaceae
- Genus: Hypocenomyce
- Species: H. tinderryensis

Binomial name
- Hypocenomyce tinderryensis Elix (2007)

Species of lichen

Hypocenomyce tinderryensis is a species of crustose lichen in the family Ophioparmaceae. It was described as a new species in 2007 by Australian lichenologist John Alan Elix. The type was collected in Tinderry Range in New South Wales, for which it is named. There it was found growing on a dead Eucalyptus trunk at an elevation of 1,200 m (3,900 ft). It somewhat resembles the type species of Hypocenomyce, H. scalaris, but it can be distinguished from that lichen by its smaller apothecia, longer ascospores, and differences in the morphology of the squamules (scales) that comprise the thallus.
