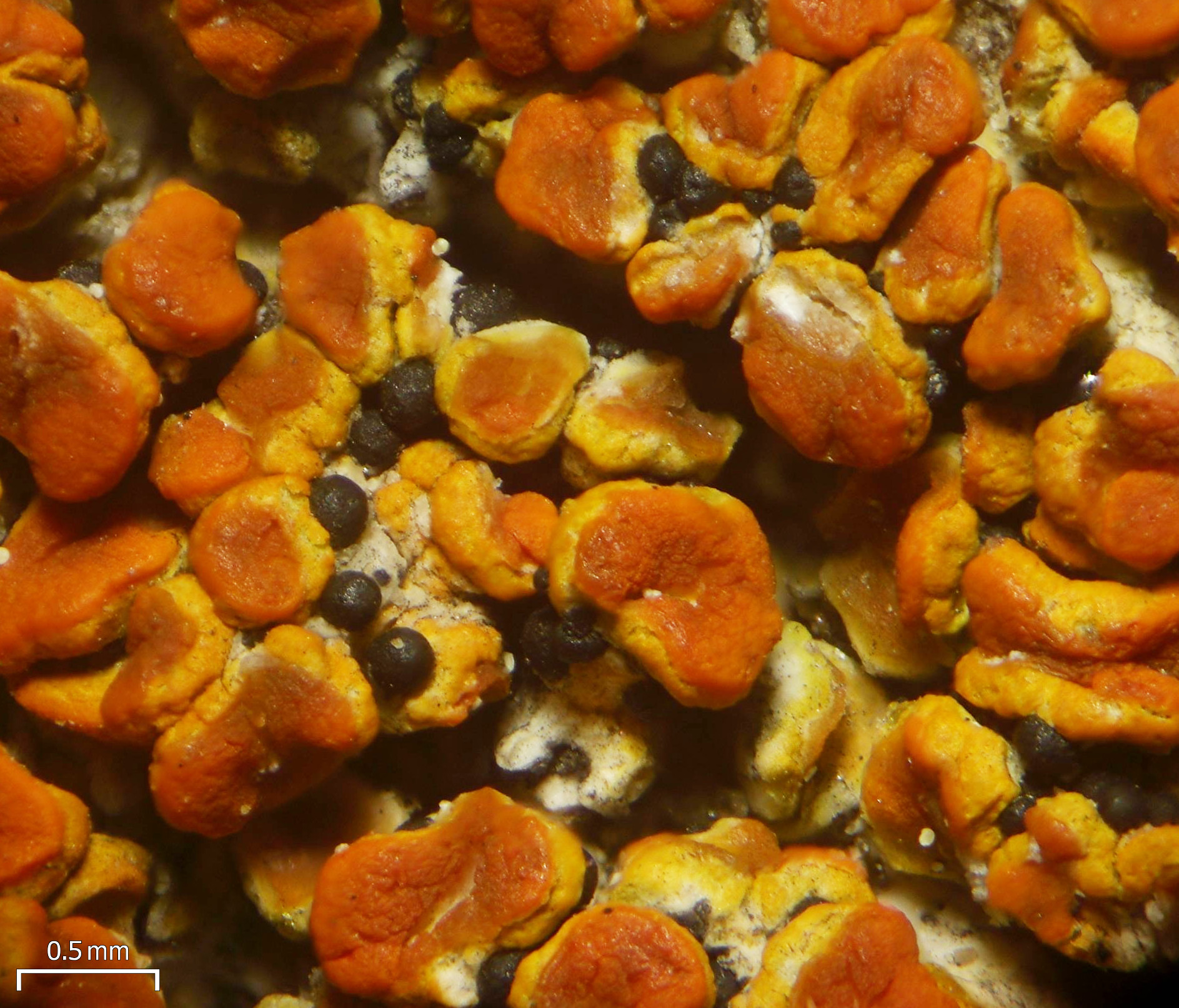

Scientific classification
- Kingdom: Fungi
- Division: Ascomycota
- Class: Eurotiomycetes
- Order: Verrucariales
- Family: Verrucariaceae
- Genus: Muellerella
- Species: M. ventosicola

Binomial name
- Muellerella ventosicola (Mudd) D. Hawksw. (2003)

Synonyms
- Mycoporum pygmaeum var. ventosicola (Mudd) Jatta; Microthelia ventosicola Mudd; Tichothecium pygmaeum var. ventosicola (Mudd) G. Winter; Pyrenula ventosicola (Mudd) Willey; Verrucaria ventosicola (Mudd) Leight.; Muellerella pygmaea var. ventosicola (Mudd) Triebel

= Muellerella ventosicola =

Species of fungus

Muellerella ventosicola is a species of lichenicolous fungus in the family Verrucariaceae. It shows preference to growing on species of the genus Rhizocarpon but can also associate with other genera.

Muellerella ventosicola has been reported growing on Rhizocarpon geographicum in Iceland, Sicily and in Ukraine, on Rhizocarpon grande in Ukraine and an unknown Rhizocarpon species in the Tatra Mountains of Poland. It has also been reported on the genera Ophioparma, notably Ophioparma ventosa, and Protoparmelia.
