= James B. Armstrong =

American businessman and colonel (1824–1900)

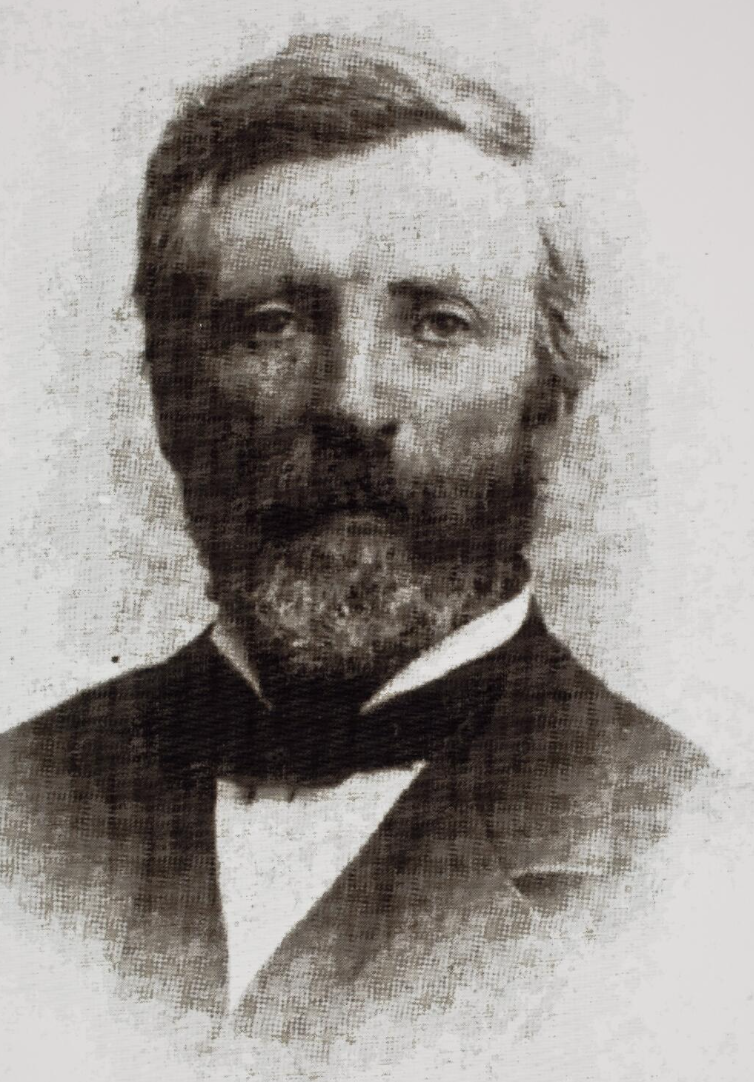
- Portrait of Armstrong
- Born: James Boydston Armstrong; August 20, 1824; Waynesburg, Ohio, U.S.
- Died: October 15, 1900 (aged 76); Cloverdale, California, U.S.
- Burial place: Santa Rosa Rural Cemetery, Santa Rosa, California, U.S.
- Military career
- Allegiance: United States; Union
- Branch: United States Army; Union Army
- Service years: 1862–1865
- Rank: Colonel
- Unit: 95th Ohio Infantry Regiment
- Commands: 134th Ohio Infantry Regiment
- Conflicts: American Civil War; Battle of Richmond
- Other work: Lumber mill owner and businessman

James Boydston Armstrong (August 20, 1824 – October 15, 1900) was a businessman and a Colonel during the American Civil War. Originally from Ohio, Armstrong later moved to Sonoma County, California and became a prominent business figure in local society during the second half of the 19th century. Armstrong Redwoods State Natural Reserve outside of Guerneville, which he had set aside as a public nature park, bears his name.

== Early life and career ==
James Boydston Armstrong was born August 20, 1824 in Waynesburg, Ohio. His father, George Armstrong (1799-1864), was an Irish-born Methodist minister. When James was young, his family moved to Urbana, Ohio.

As a young man, Armstrong was trained as a civil engineer and surveyor. In 1845, at age 21, Armstrong was elected as the county surveyor of Champaign County. In 1851, he would complete the county's first official map. He later served two terms as county treasurer.

On December 25, 1847, Armstrong married Eleanor Fullerton Wilson (1827-1880). Together they would have three children: Elizabeth "Lizzie" Armstrong (1850-1924); Walter Armstrong (1852-1933); and Kate Armstrong (1857-1898).

During the 1850s, Armstrong began working in journalism, writing for the Urbana Daily Citizen. In 1856, he began writing for the Cincinnati Gazette as its California correspondent.

In 1860, Armstrong purchased the defunct Farmers Bank of Urbana and reopened it as the Armstrong Bank, serving as its president from 1860 to 1874.

Politically, Armstrong was a member of the recently formed Republican Party, and served as a delegate for Ohio to the 1860 Republican National Convention, in which he voted for the nomination of Abraham Lincoln.

== Civil War ==
Following the break out of the American Civil War, on August 16, 1862 Armstrong joined the Union army and was commissioned as a Lieutenant colonel for the 95th Ohio Infantry Regiment under Colonel William L. McMillen. At the end of August 1862 Armstrong and the regiment engaged the Confederates at the Battle of Richmond in Madison County, Kentucky, but were routed with heavy losses. Armstrong mustered out of service that October.

In May 1864 Armstrong re-enlisted with the army and was commissioned as Colonel of the 134th Ohio Infantry Regiment. As the war came to a close, Armstrong marched the regiment from Washington into Virginia, patrolling the now Union occupied territories in the state, mustering out near Richmond at the end of August. Armstrong returned home to Urbana following the war.

== California and the Redwoods ==
In 1874, his wife and daughters being in poor health and seeking a better environment, Armstrong moved his family to California, settling in Santa Rosa. In 1876, Armstrong developed and designed several residential subdivisions along Humboldt, Orchard, and King Streets, which now are a part of Santa Rosa's Junior College neighborhood.

Shortly after his arrival in California, on October 28, 1874, Armstrong began purchasing significant acreages of Redwood timberlands at Big Bottom Valley near Guerneville. During the 1870s, Armstrong's mills were producing five million board feet of lumber per year.

Armstrong also purchased numerous acres of farm and orchard land around Sonoma County, particularly near Cloverdale, and became increasingly influenced by plants, agriculture, and experimenting with different varieties of apples and prunes. His fascination with crop plants was likely influenced by his friend and neighbor, Luther Burbank, the nationally renowned horticulturist, who would later encourage Armstrong to preserve his redwoods for future generations.

In 1878, Armstrong sold 600 acres of Redwood timberland to his youngest daughter, Kate, who was a lifelong invalid, for the price of "one dollar, love, and affection." Armstrong's express goal was for Kate to preserve the grove as a park available for the public to use and enjoy.

== Later life and death ==
On August 6, 1880, Armstrong's wife, Eleanor, died. Armstrong would later remarry Jessie MaGee (1859-1921) on January 1, 1891, near Los Angeles.

In 1880, Armstrong purchased the Santa Rosa Republican newspaper and served as editor until he sold it in 1882.

Inspired by his love for plants and agriculture, in 1892 Armstrong was one of the founders of the Cloverdale Citrus Fair, making it the oldest county fair in the state.

In 1891 and 1893, Armstrong suffered from two severe strokes, which left him partially paralyzed. He died on October 15, 1900, at his home in Cloverdale and was buried in the Santa Rosa Rural Cemetery with Eleanor.

== Legacy ==
In 1895, Armstrong had left an endowment in his will of $100,000 to Kate to produce his proposed botanical park. However, due to the failure of the bank in which the money was held, the endowment was never transferred. Due to the financial constraints, the land was transferred from Kate to Armstrong's son, Walter, and later sold to Armstrong's family friend, Harrison LeBaron.

LeBaron and Armstrong's eldest daughter, Lizzie Armstrong Jones, with support from prominent local figures, including Luther Burbank, mounted a decades-long campaign both around the county and to the state government to preserve the Armstrong grove as a public park and to raise funds to do so. In 1917, the campaign was finally successful when the county purchased the grove. In 1934, the grove was transferred to state ownership, and in 1936 it opened as Armstrong Redwoods State Natural Reserve.

At over 1,400 years old, the oldest tree in the park, The Colonel Armstrong Tree, is named for James B. Armstrong.
