= Leioderma =

Scientific classification
- Domain: Eukaryota
- Kingdom: Fungi
- Division: Ascomycota
- Class: Lecanoromycetes
- Order: Peltigerales
- Family: Pannariaceae
- Genus: Leioderma; Nyl. (1888)

Type species
- Leioderma pycnophorum Nyl. (1888)

Species
- L. amphibolum L. applanatum L. cherokeense L. duplicatum L. erythrocarpum L. glabrum L. pycnophorum L. sorediatum L. spongiosum

Genus of lichens

Leioderma is a genus of lichen-forming fungi in the family Pannariaceae. These lichens form small, leaf-like rosettes that are loosely attached to their growing surface and can reach 10–15 cm across. The upper surface is typically grey-blue in colour and may be smooth or have a fine, cobweb-like texture. The genus contains nine species that are mainly found on tree bark in humid forests, with a distribution centred on New Zealand and Australia but extending to South America and North America.

== Taxonomy ==
The genus was circumscribed by the Finnish lichenologist William Nylander in 1888. He assigned Leioderma pycnophorum as the type species. In his original description, Nylander characterised Leioderma as having a membranaceous, lobed thallus with lecanorine apothecia (fruiting bodies) that are sparsely distributed across the lobes. He noted that the thallus was thin, with a thickness of about 0.1 millimetre, and described the lobes as having reflexed (bent back) margins measuring 10–15 millimetres wide. Nylander distinguished the genus by its simple spores (paraphyses lacking septa) and the distinctive surface granulation on the upper portions of the thallus. The species was described from specimens collected on destroyed vegetation at Greymouth (New Zealand), a disturbed habitat.

== Description ==
Leioderma forms small, leaf-like (foliose) to scale-like (squamulose) rosettes that are usually loosely attached to their substrate and can reach 10–15 cm across. Individual lobes are rounded, 1–6 mm wide, and may lie flat, arch slightly, or curve inward with age; their edges are often faintly scalloped and can bear flattened outgrowths (phyllidia) or coarse, powdery reproductive granules (soralia). The upper surface is most often grey-blue but may appear brownish; it ranges from smooth to faintly roughened or clothed in a fine, cobweb-like felt (an arachnoid tomentum), giving each species a distinctive texture. Beneath a thin, brick-like (paraplectenchymatous) cortex 30–50 μm thick lies a layer of cyanobacteria—usually chains of Scytonema, but compact clusters of Nostoc in the subgenus Fuscoderma—followed by a loosely woven white medulla 70–100 micrometres (μm) thick. The lower surface is pale to ochre-brown and carries tufts of simple, often darkening rhizines up to 2–5 mm long that anchor the thallus. Environmental factors such as moisture and light account for much of the observed variation in lobe width, colour, and rhizine length across populations.

Reproduction is mainly through laminal apothecia that sit flush with the surface, measure up to about 1.5 mm across, and display pale to dark red-brown discs often framed by a thin margin. Internally, the hymenium turns blue in iodine (an amyloid reaction), and the cylindrical eight-spored asci have a distinct amyloid cap. The resulting spores are single-celled, colourless, thick-walled with an ellipsoid shape, typically 13–20 × 6–10 μm, and can be slightly pointed at the ends in some species. Minute black pycnidia, especially along the lobe margins, release straight rod-shaped conidia 3–5 × 1–2 μm. Chemically the genus is almost inert: thin-layer chromatography usually detects no secondary metabolites, although ursolic acid occurs sporadically and rare individuals of L. sorediatum produce traces of atranorin, skyrin, and related pigments. Such chemical oddities are considered exceptional and of little taxonomic importance.

== Habitat and distribution ==
Leioderma species are mainly corticolous (bark-dwelling) epiphytes of damp, shaded forests; they colonise the bark of trees and shrubs where humidity is consistently high. Saxicolous (rock-dwelling) occurrences are uncommon and largely involve L. duplicatum and the ecologically plastic L. sorediatum. Four taxa (L. amphibolum, L. applanatum, L. duplicatum and L. pycnophorum) are confined to low elevations below about 1,000 m, whereas L. erythrocarpum and L. sorediatum span the full range from sea-level mangroves to montane sites at roughly 2,800 m and 2,600 m, respectively.

The genus was long regarded as a Gondwanan group centred on New Zealand and south-east Australia, with disjunct outliers in Chile, Brazil and Tristan da Cunha. Two species described since that assessment—L. spongiosum from Ecuador and L. cherokeense from the south-eastern United States—extend its distribution into tropical South America and temperate North America. A report of Leioderma sorediatum further suggests that Leioderma is more widespread than previously recognised.

== Species ==
As of June 2025, Species Fungorum (in the Catalogue of Life) accepts nine species of Leioderma:

- Leioderma amphibolum (C.Knight) P.M.Jørg. & D.J.Galloway (1987)
- Leioderma applanatum D.J.Galloway & P.M.Jørg. (1987)
- Leioderma cherokeense P.M.Jørg. & Tønsberg (2005)
- Leioderma duplicatum (Müll.Arg.) D.J.Galloway & P.M.Jørg. (1987)
- Leioderma erythrocarpum (Delise ex Nyl.) D.J.Galloway & P.M.Jørg. (1987)}
- Leioderma glabrum D.J.Galloway & P.M.Jørg. (1987)
- Leioderma pycnophorum Nyl. (1888)
- Leioderma sorediatum D.J.Galloway & P.M.Jørg. (1987)
- Leioderma spongiosum P.M.Jørg. & Arv. (2004)
