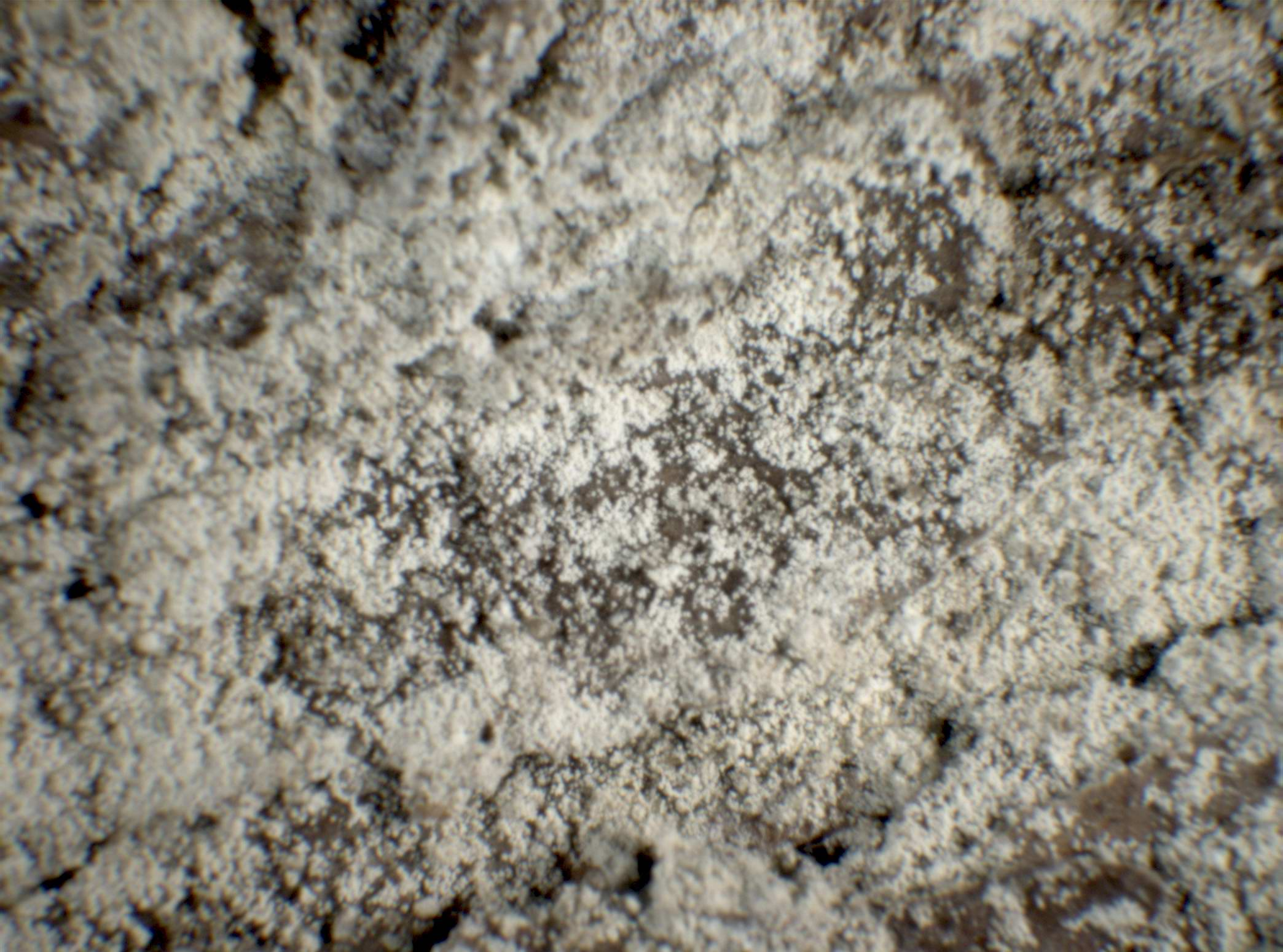

Scientific classification
- Domain: Eukaryota
- Kingdom: Fungi
- Division: Ascomycota
- Class: Lecanoromycetes
- Order: Lecanorales
- Family: Stereocaulaceae
- Genus: Lepraria
- Species: L. jackii

Binomial name
- Lepraria jackii Tønsberg (1992)

Synonyms
- Lepraria toensbergiana Slav.-Bay. & Kukwa (2005); Lepraria jackii var. toensbergiana (Slav.-Bay. & Kukwa) Kukwa (2012)

= Lepraria jackii =

Species of lichen

Lepraria jackii is a species of leprose lichen in the family Stereocaulaceae, described by Tor Tønsberg in 1992. It forms a powdery thallus with variable colouration, ranging from pale green to straw-coloured, and grows on bark, mosses, wood, and rock surfaces in humid, sheltered environments. The species is characterised by its abundant soredia and distinctive secondary metabolites, including atranorin. Lepraria jackii has been recorded across Europe, North America, Asia, and Australia, preferring acidic substrates.

== Taxonomy ==
Lepraria jackii was first described by the Norwegian lichenologist Tor Tønsberg in 1992. The holotype was collected by Tønsberg on 16 September 1981 in Grong, Nord-Trøndelag, Norway, west of Abrahammyra, at an elevation of 80–100 m (260–330 ft). It was found growing on the bark of Picea abies. The specimen, designated Tønsberg 6176, is deposited at the herbarium of the University Museum of Bergen (BG). The species epithet honours the British lichenologist Jack Laundon, who published several new species in genus Lepraria.

Molecular studies suggested that Lepraria jackii does not form a monophyletic clade, indicating it may represent more than one lineage. The species includes multiple chemotypes, with some containing jackinic and rangiformic acids. A related taxon, Lepraria toensbergiana, was initially described as a distinct species based on its production of toensbergianic acid, but some researchers later synonymised it with L. jackii. However, phylogenetic studies found that while L. jackii and L. toensbergiana are closely related, they form separate, well-supported monophyletic clades, leading to L. toensbergiana being treated as L. jackii var. toensbergiana.

Further studies have also revealed additional genetic variation within L. jackii, with different clades clustering separately in molecular analyses. Some specimens previously considered part of L. jackii (L. jackii II) appear more closely related to a distinct species group, highlighting the need for further taxonomic clarification.

== Description ==
The species forms a powdery lichen thallus with either a diffuse or defined margin, lacking lobes. Its colour varies from pale green, greyish green, and yellowish green to straw-colored, with bluish green occurring rarely. The thallus has no true medulla (inner layer), but in specimens growing on mosses, it develops a thick white hypothallus (attachment layer) that can sometimes be exposed. The reproductive structures consist of abundant soredia ranging from fine to coarse (up to 0.16 mm in diameter), sometimes with short projecting hyphae. These soredia may cluster together into larger units called consoredia up to 0.16 mm across. The species is characterised by its distinctive chemistry, primarily containing atranorin and specific fatty acids.

== Habitat and distribution ==
This lichen grows on various substrates including tree bark, mosses, wood, and both siliceous and neutral rock surfaces, rarely occurring on soil or plant debris. It typically inhabits relatively humid, sheltered locations. The species has been recorded across Europe, North America, Asia, and Australia, showing a preference for acidic substrates.
