= Leioderma cherokeense =

Scientific classification
- Kingdom: Fungi
- Division: Ascomycota
- Class: Lecanoromycetes
- Order: Peltigerales
- Family: Pannariaceae
- Genus: Leioderma
- Species: L. cherokeense

Binomial name
- Leioderma cherokeense P.M.Jørg. & Tønsberg (2005)
- Holotype: Great Smoky Mountains National Park, USA

Species of lichen

Leioderma cherokeense is a species of corticolous (bark-dwelling), foliose lichen in the family Pannariaceae.

== Taxonomy ==
Leioderma cherokeense was formally described as a new species in 2005 by the Norwegian lichenologists Per Magnus Jørgensen and Tor Tønsberg. The type specimen was collected by Tønsberg in 2002 from the Great Smoky Mountains National Park (North Carolina), at an elevation of 650 m (2,130 ft). There, in a mixed deciduous forest, it was found growing on the bark at the base of a tulip tree (Liriodendron tulipifera) trunk. The species epithet refers to the Cherokee people that inhabit the region.

== Description ==
Leioderma cherokeense is a foliose lichen, meaning it has a leaf-like structure. The thallus (body of the lichen) can grow up to 2 cm (13/16 in) in diameter and is composed of rounded lobes that are about 3 mm (1/8 in) across. The margins of these lobes are curled under. The upper surface of the thallus is pale gray-blue and covered with spider web-like hairs, especially towards the ends of the lobes, while the center is more or less smooth and can be slightly wrinkled. The lower surface features scattered, branched rhizohyphae (root-like structures), which range in color from white to dark bluish.

In cross-section, the thallus is 150–200 μm thick and has an upper cortex (outer layer) that is 30–40 μm thick, made up of tightly packed cells. The photobiont (photosynthetic partner) is Scytonema, a type of cyanobacterium, which forms short chains with individual cells measuring 7–10 μm. Reproductive structures such as apothecia (fruiting bodies) and pycnidia (asexual reproductive structures), have not been observed to occur in this species.
