= Lepraria torii =

Scientific classification
- Kingdom: Fungi
- Division: Ascomycota
- Class: Lecanoromycetes
- Order: Lecanorales
- Family: Stereocaulaceae
- Genus: Lepraria
- Species: L. torii

Binomial name
- Lepraria torii Pérez-Ortega & T.Sprib. (2009)
- Holotype: Chilkoot Trail, Alaska, USA

Species of lichen

Lepraria torii is a species of corticolous and lignicolous (bark- and wood-dwelling), leprose lichen in the family Stereocaulaceae. It is found in northwestern North America.

== Taxonomy ==
The lichen was first scientifically described in 2009 by the lichenologists Sergio Pérez-Ortega and Toby Spribille. The type specimen of Lepraria torii was collected by the authors on July 28, 2008, along the Chilkoot Trail in Alaska. It was found between Canyon City and Pleasant Camp at an elevation of 230 m (750 ft). The lichen was growing on detritus at the base of a western hemlock (Tsuga heterophylla). The species epithet honours the Norwegian lichenologist Tor Tønsberg, "in honour of his 20 years of work on Lepraria in North America (and Europe)".

== Description ==
Lepraria torii is a crustose and leprose lichen, meaning it forms a crust-like thallus layer on the surface it grows on (episubstratal) with a powdery texture and a well-defined border. It does not have lobes and is usually green to yellowish-green in color, often showing scattered areas of light orange pigment.

This species lacks a true medulla, the inner layer found in many lichens. However, the soredia (powdery reproductive structures) beneath the cortical area can form a whitish layer in the thickest parts of the thallus. The hypothallus, the layer beneath the thallus, is composed of a network of whitish tangled hyphae, which are about 2.5 μm wide. These hyphae are usually visible at the border of the thallus and are often tinged with a dark pigment.

The soredia of Lepraria torii are powdery and measure up to 45 μm in diameter. Sometimes, short projecting hyphae are present among the soredia, and inter-soredial hyphae are easily visible under a microscope. Each soredium contains up to seven chlorococcoid photobiont cells, which are the green algal cells that engage in photosynthesis. These cells are rounded and can be up to 12 μm in diameter, usually having a thick cell wall up to 3 μm.

Neither ascomata (sexual fruiting bodies) nor pycnidia (asexual fruiting bodies) have been observed to occur in this species.

== Chemistry ==
The lichen produces several secondary metabolites (lichen products): fumarprotocetraric acid (a constant and major component), protocetraric acid (constant but minor), and angardianic acid/roccellic acid (major). Atranorin was detected in only one specimen. Chemical spot tests reveal the following reactions: potassium hydroxide (K) test can be negative or turn brownish if atranorin is present, C−, KC−, and Pd (orange or red).

== Habitat and distribution ==
Lepraria torii is predominantly found in old-growth forests ranging from sea level to nearly 1,100 m (3,600 ft) in elevation. Its primary habitats are the Cascade and Selkirk Mountains, where it grows on wood and bark, particularly favoring western red cedar (Thuja plicata) and western hemlock (Tsuga heterophylla). This species is commonly seen on standing dead trees (snags) and on uprooted trees, often referred to as 'root tables.'

This lichen is a distinctive component of the old-growth forests in Western Canada, southeastern Alaska, and the American Pacific Northwest, growing in the rich, moist environments provided by these ancient forest ecosystems.
