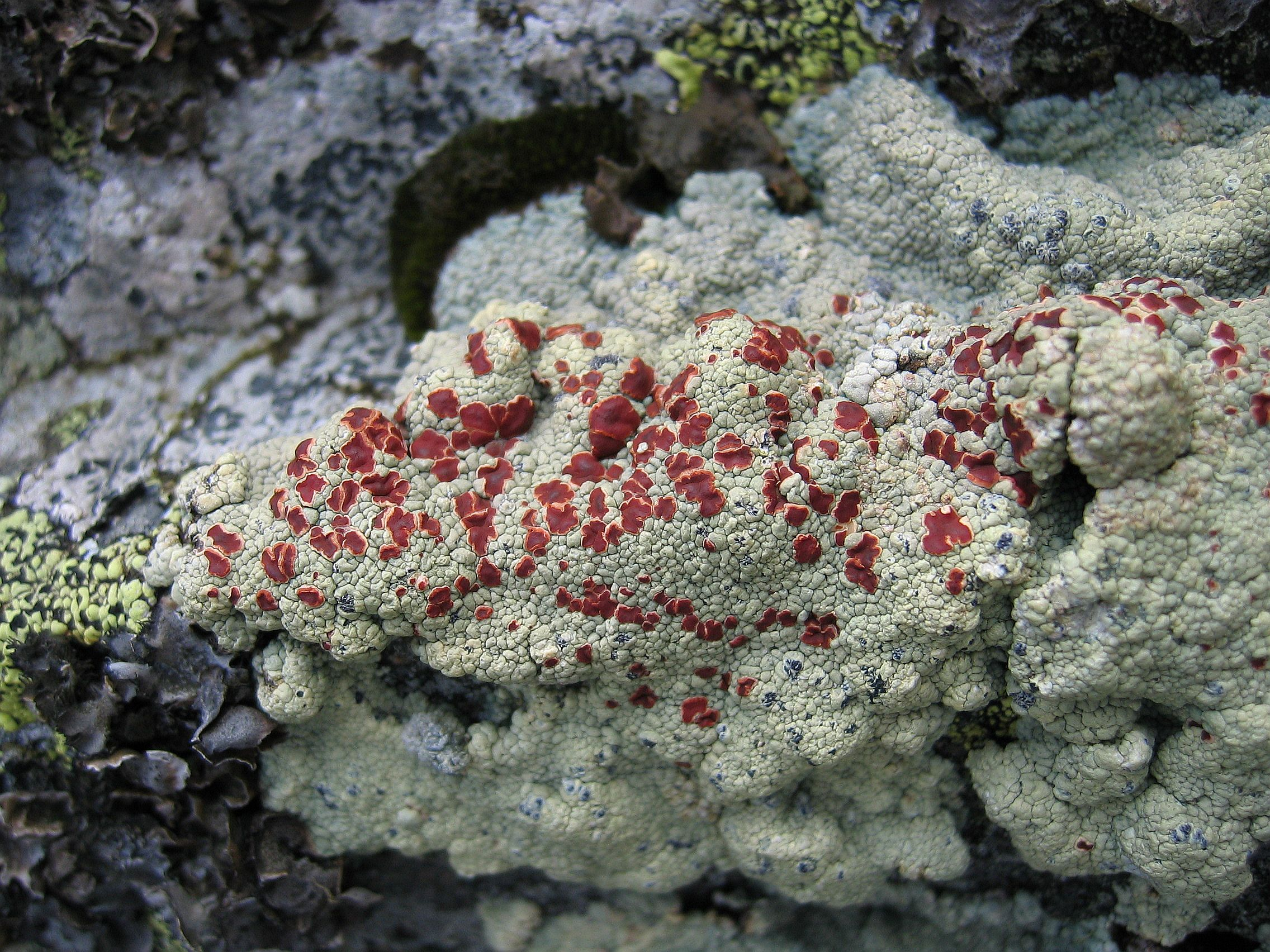

Scientific classification
- Kingdom: Fungi
- Division: Ascomycota
- Class: Lecanoromycetes
- Order: Umbilicariales
- Family: Ophioparmaceae
- Genus: Ophioparma
- Species: O. ventosa

Binomial name
- Ophioparma ventosa (L.) Norman (1852)

= Ophioparma ventosa =

Species of lichen-forming fungus

Ophioparma ventosa is a species of lichen belonging to the family Ophioparmaceae.

It has cosmopolitan distribution.

Ophioparma ventosa is a know host to the lichenicolous fungus species Muellerella ventosicola.

Synonym:

- Lichen ventosus L. (= basionym)
- Haematomma ventosum (L.) A.Massal.

== See also ==
- List of lichens named by Carl Linnaeus
