= Oliver Colwell =

- Born: 1834; Champaign County, Ohio
- Died: October 12, 1872 (aged 37–38); Ohio
- Burial place: Woodstock Cemetery
- Military career
- Allegiance: United States of America
- Branch: United States Army
- Rank: First Lieutenant
- Unit: 95th Regiment, Ohio Volunteer Infantry - Company G
- Conflicts: Battle of Nashville
- Awards: Medal of Honor

First Lieutenant Oliver Colwell (1834 to October 12, 1872) was an American soldier who fought in the American Civil War. Colwell received the country's highest award for bravery during combat, the Medal of Honor, for his action during the Battle of Nashville in Tennessee on 16 December 1864. He was honored with the award on 24 February 1865.

== Biography ==
Colwell was born in Champaign County, Ohio, in 1834. He enlisted into the 95th Ohio Infantry. He died on 12 October 1872, and his remains are interred at the Woodstock Cemetery in Ohio.

== Medal of Honor citation ==
Capture of enemy flag.

== See also ==
- List of American Civil War Medal of Honor recipients: A–F
