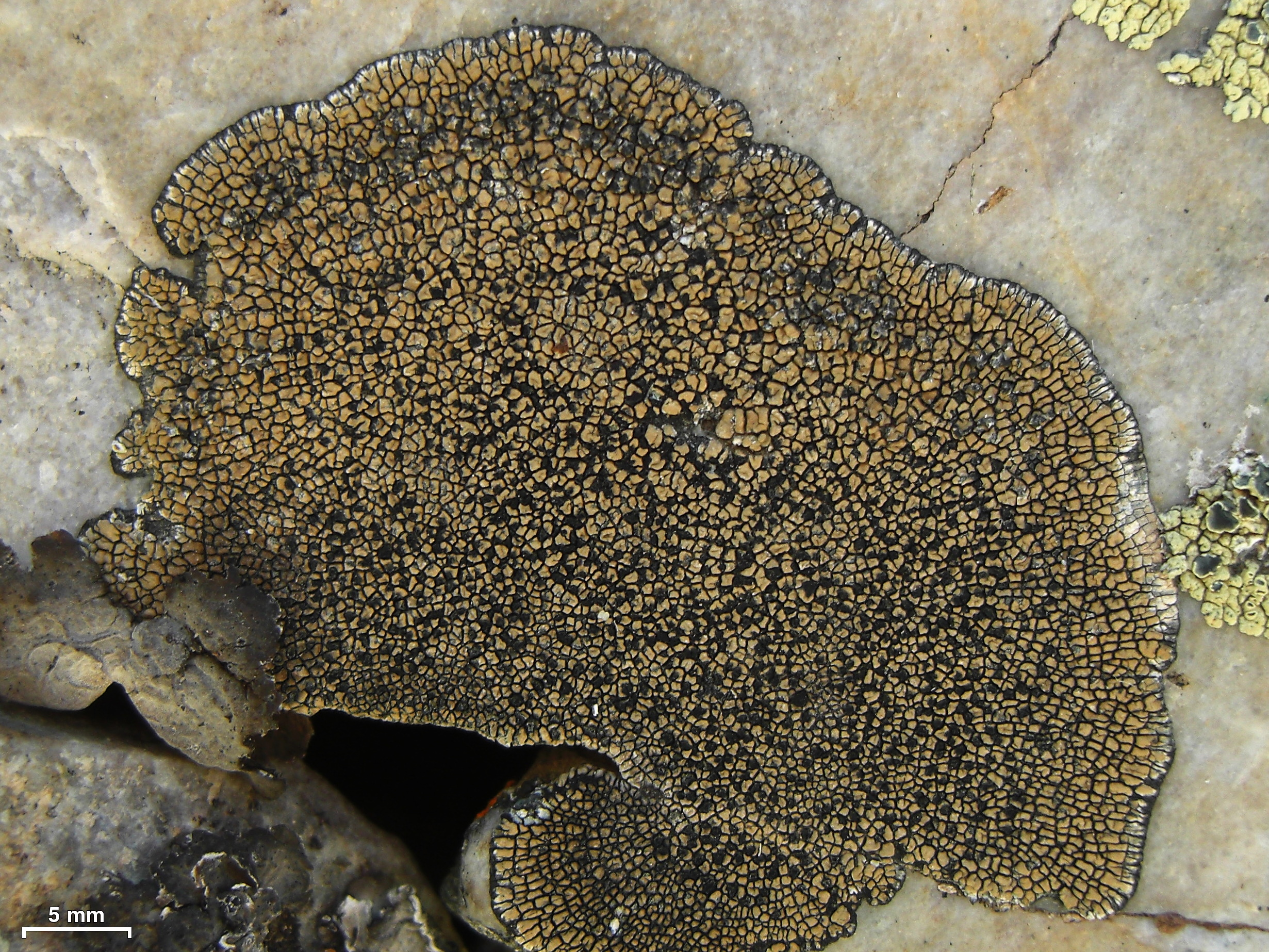
- Sporastatia testudinea growing on a rock in Wheeler Peak, Nevada, USA

Scientific classification
- Domain: Eukaryota
- Kingdom: Fungi
- Division: Ascomycota
- Class: Lecanoromycetes
- Order: Rhizocarpales
- Family: Sporastatiaceae
- Genus: Sporastatia; A.Massal. (1854)

Type species
- Sporastatia testudinea (Ach.) A.Massal. (1855)

Species
- S. crassulata S. karakorina S. polyspora S. testudinea

Synonyms
- Gyrothecium Nyl. (1855)

= Sporastatia =

Genus of lichens

Sporastatia is a genus of crustose lichens in the family Sporastatiaceae. It has four species. Sporastatia lichens are long-lived species that grow on siliceous or weakly calcareous rocks in arctic and alpine locales.

== Taxonomy ==
Sporastatia was circumscribed by Italian lichenologist Abramo Bartolommeo Massalongo in 1854, with Sporastatia testudinea assigned as the type species. The name Gyrothecium, proposed by William Nylander in 1855, is a synonym of Sporastatia.

Following molecular phylogenetic studies published in 2013, Sporastatia was placed in a separate family, the Sporastatiaceae. This family was shown to have a sister taxon relationship with the family Rhizocarpaceae, and together the two families comprise the order Rhizocarpales.

== Description ==
Characteristics of the genus include the crust-like thallus underlain by a black prothallus that is revealed around the margins; lecideine apothecia, and asci that contain 100–200 spores.

Some Sporastatia species are hosts for lichenicolous fungi, including Rhizocarpon pusillum, R. asiaticum, and Miriquidica invadens.

== Species ==
- Sporastatia crassulata Yakovch. & Davydov (2018) – Altai Mountains
- Sporastatia karakorina (Obermayer & Poelt) Davydov & Yakovch. (2018)
- Sporastatia polyspora (Nyl.) Grummann (1963)
- Sporastatia testudinea (Ach.) A.Massal. (1854)

The taxon Sporastatia desmaspora (C.Knight) C.W.Dodge (1970) is now known as Biatorella desmaspora.
