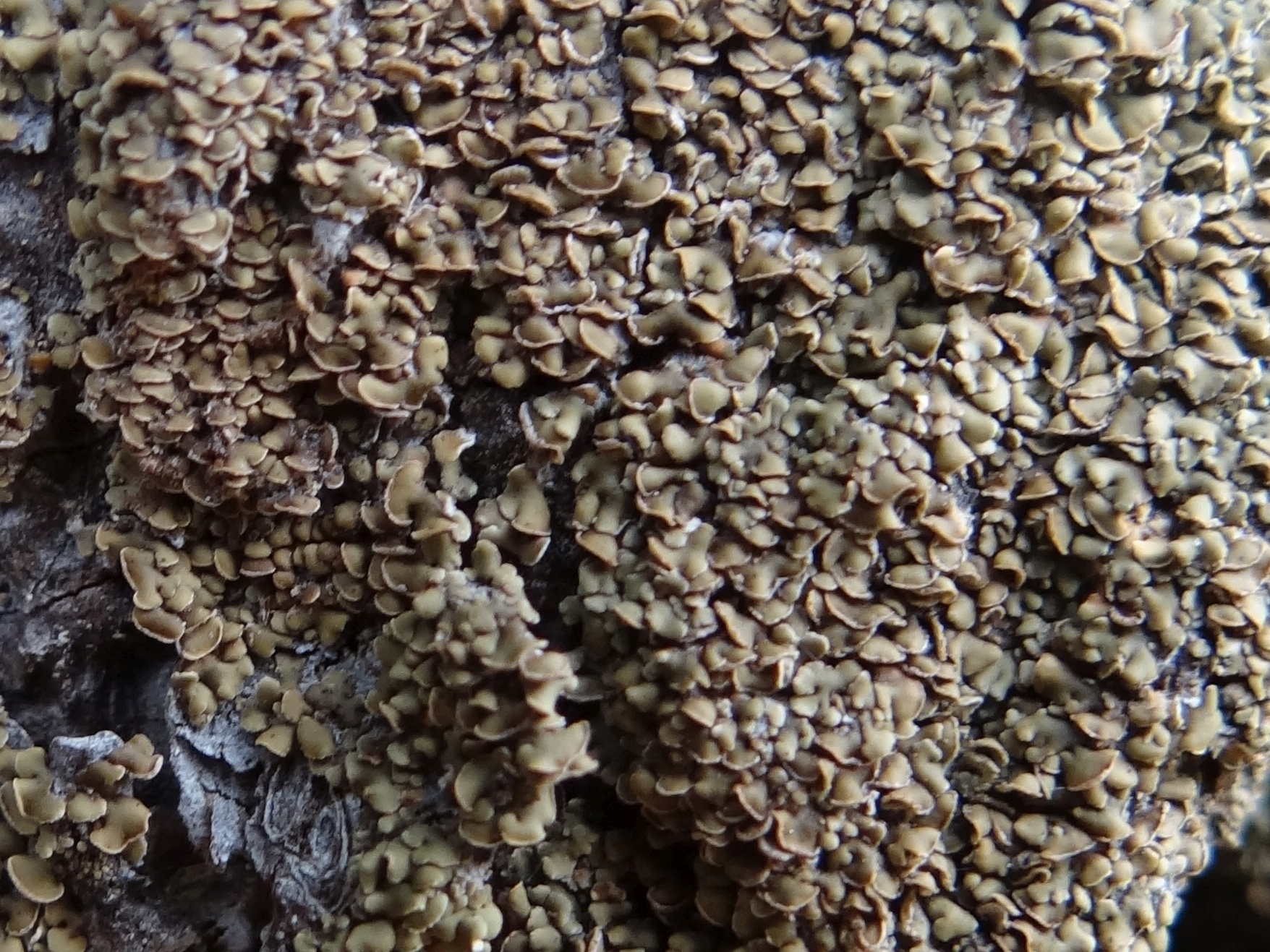
- Hypocenomyce scalaris

Scientific classification
- Kingdom: Fungi
- Division: Ascomycota
- Class: Lecanoromycetes
- Order: Umbilicariales
- Family: Ophioparmaceae
- Genus: Hypocenomyce; M.Choisy (1951)

Type species
- Hypocenomyce scalaris (Ach.) M.Choisy (1951)

Species
- H. australis H. castaneocinerea H. scalaris H. stoechadiana H. tinderryensis

= Hypocenomyce =

Genus of lichens

Hypocenomyce is a genus of lichen-forming fungi in the family Ophioparmaceae. Species in the genus grow on bark and on wood, especially on burned tree stumps and trunks in coniferous forest. Hypocenomyce lichens are widely distributed in the northern hemisphere.

== Taxonomy ==
The genus was circumscribed in 1951 by French lichenologist Maurice Choisy to contain the single species Hypocenomyce scalaris, a lichen that was first formally described by Erik Acharius in 1795. Choisy's original concept of the genus featured a squamulose thallus, adnate apothecia of the lecideine type (i.e., lacking algae and an amphithecium, with a black carbonized margin as in the genus Lecidea) and pycnoconidia that are short, straight, and cylindrical. Norwegian lichenologist Einer Timdal revised the genus in 1984, describing two new species to bring the total Hypocenomyce species up to ten. Since then, two new species have been described, and several have been transferred to other genera.

Norwegian lichenologist Einar Timdal revised the genus in the mid-1980s and identified four evolutionary groups; he suggested that the genus was polyphyletic. A 2013 molecular phylogenetic study clarified the phylogenetic relationships amongst species previously classified in the genus. It was shown that the genus–as then circumscribed–consisted of seven clades belonging to different genera, families, orders and even subclasses. Based on these results, the genus was split into different genera – Carbonicola, Fulgidea, and Hypocenomyce. The Hypocenomyce xanthococca species group, which had been previously raised to the level of genus as Pycnora, was further split into Pycnora and Toensbergia.

== Species ==
- Hypocenomyce australis Timdal (1984)
- Hypocenomyce castaneocinerea (Räsänen) Timdal (1984)
- Hypocenomyce scalaris (Ach.) M.Choisy (1951)
- Hypocenomyce stoechadiana Abbassi Maaf & Cl.Roux (1985)
- Hypocenomyce tinderryensis Elix (2007) – Australia

Species previously classified in Hypocenomyce include:

- Hypocenomyce anthracophila (Nyl.) P.James & Gotth.Schneid. (1980) = Carbonicola anthracophila
- Hypocenomyce caradocensis (Leight. ex Nyl.) P.James & Gotth.Schneid. (1980) = Xylopsora caradocensis
- Hypocenomyce foveata Timdal (1984) = Carbonicola foveata
- Hypocenomyce friesii (Ach.) P.James & Gotth.Schneid. (1980) = Xylopsora friesii
- Hypocenomyce isidiosa Elix (2006) = Xylographa isidiosa
- Hypocenomyce leucococca R.Sant. (1986) = Toensbergia leucococca
- Hypocenomyce oligospora Timdal (2001) = Fulgidea oligospora
- Hypocenomyce praestabilis (Nyl.) Timdal (1984) = Pycnora praestabilis
- Hypocenomyce rubiformis (Wahlenb. ex Ach.) M.Choisy (1953) = Psora rubiformis
- Hypocenomyce sierrae Timdal (2001) = Fulgidea sierrae
- Hypocenomyce sorophora (Vain.) P.James & Poelt (1981) = Pycnora sorophora
- Hypocenomyce xanthococca (Sommerf.) P.James & Gotth. Schneid. (1980) = Pycnora xanthococca
