= 134th Ohio Infantry Regiment =

- Active: May 5, 1864, to August 31, 1864
- Country: United States
- Allegiance: Union
- Branch: Infantry

Insignia
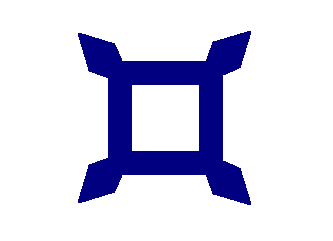
- 3rd Division, X Corps

The 134th Ohio Infantry Regiment, sometimes 134th Ohio Volunteer Infantry (or 134th OVI) was an infantry regiment in the Union Army during the American Civil War.

== Service ==
The 134th Ohio Infantry was organized at Camp Chase in Columbus, Ohio, and mustered in May 5, 1864, for 100 days service under the command of Colonel James B. Armstrong.

The regiment was attached to 2nd Brigade, 3rd Division, X Corps, Army of the James.

The 134th Ohio Infantry mustered out of service at Camp Chase on August 31, 1864.

== Detailed service ==
Left Ohio for Cumberland, Md., May 7, and duty there until June 6. Moved to Washington, D.C., June 6; then to White House and City Point, Va. Duty at City Point pontooning the James River and building roads until June 17. Picket duty at Bermuda Hundred until June 22. Marched to Deep Bottom June 22, and engaged in building works. Picket duty and operations against Richmond on the north side of the James River until August.

== Ohio National Guard ==
Over 35,000 Ohio National Guardsmen were federalized and organized into regiments for 100 days service in May 1864. Shipped to the Eastern Theater, they were designed to be placed in "safe" rear areas to protect railroads and supply points, thereby freeing regular troops for Lt. Gen. Ulysses S. Grant’s push on the Confederate capital of Richmond, Virginia. As events transpired, many units found themselves in combat, stationed in the path of Confederate Gen. Jubal Early’s veteran Army of the Valley during its famed Valley Campaigns of 1864. Ohio Guard units met the battle-tested foe head on and helped blunt the Confederate offensive thereby saving Washington, D.C. from capture. Ohio National Guard units participated in the battles of Monacacy, Fort Stevens, Harpers Ferry, and in the siege of Petersburg.

== Casualties ==
The regiment lost 31 men during service; 1 enlisted men killed, 30 enlisted men due to disease.

== Commanders ==
- Colonel James B. Armstrong

== See also ==
- List of Ohio Civil War units
- Ohio in the Civil War
