= Acarospora toensbergii =

Scientific classification
- Kingdom: Fungi
- Division: Ascomycota
- Class: Lecanoromycetes
- Order: Acarosporales
- Family: Acarosporaceae
- Genus: Acarospora
- Species: A. toensbergii

Binomial name
- Acarospora toensbergii K.Knudsen & Kocourk. (2017)
- Holotype: Kenai Fjords National Park, Alaska, USA

Species of lichen

Acarospora toensbergii is a species of saxicolous (rock-dwelling), crustose lichen in the family Acarosporaceae. Known only from the Kenai Fjords National Park in Alaska, it was described as a new species in 2017 by the lichenologists Kerry Knudsen and Jana Kocourková. The species epithet honors the Norwegian lichenologist Tor Tønsberg, who collected the type specimen from a deglaciated alluvial terrace in 2015.

== Description ==
Lecidea toensbergii is a lichen characterized by its endolithic (within rock) hypothallus, which does not contain observable algae in the substrate and is unreactive to iodine-potassium iodide (IKI). The lichen lacks an epilithic (on the rock surface) thallus. Its apothecia (fruiting bodies) are round, dispersed, and occasionally replicate by division, measuring 0.4–1.0 mm in width and 300–400 μm in height. These apothecia emerge from the endolithic hypothallus. The thalline margin is brown and up to 200 μm wide.

The upper cortex is 20–40 μm thick, with mostly round cortical cells that are 5–6 μm in diameter. The upper layer of the cortex is brown, approximately 10 μm thick, while the lower layer is hyaline (translucent). The lateral cortex is 30–60 μm thick, extending to the base of the apothecia, and the outer layer is brown or blackened, particularly in the holotype. The algal layer beneath the hypothecium and filling the margins is about 50–100 μm thick, with algal cells measuring 8–12 μm in diameter. The medulla, up to 200 μm thick, consists of thin-walled hyphae (2–3 μm wide), intermixed with substrate crystals, and is continuous with the endolithic hypothallus.

The disc of the apothecia is round, reddish-brown, smooth, and epruinose (lacking a powdery coating), positioned lower than the thalline margin. The parathecium (a layer of tissue surrounding the disc) typically expands to about 40 μm, with hyphae that are 2 μm in diameter and brown at the apices, blending with the cortex. In some instances, the parathecium expands up to 100 μm wide, excluding most or all of the upper cortex but not the lateral cortex. The epihymenium is 10 μm high, reddish-brown, and coherent in a thick gel, unreactive to IKI. The hymenium (the spore-producing layer) is 90–120 μm tall, with paraphyses (sterile filaments) mostly 2 μm wide at mid-level and containing oil drops. The asci (spore-bearing cells) are cylindrical, about 50 by 10 μm when fully developed, containing up to 100 ascospores, which are 7 by 3 μm when fully developed but often smaller. The subhymenium is about 40 μm thick and IKI+ blue, while the hypothecium is 10 μm thick and IKI−. No pycnidia (asexual fruiting bodies) or secondary metabolites were observed to occur in this species.

=== Similar species ===
Sarcogyne canadensis is somewhat similar in appearance to Acarospora toensbergii, but it develops differently: its apothecia arise from as immersed apothecia in an areole or squamule, rather than directly from an endosubstratal hypothallus. Further, it grows on calcareous, rather than siliceous rock.
