= 95th Ohio Infantry Regiment =

- Active: August 19, 1862 - August 14, 1865
- Country: United States
- Branch: Infantry
- Engagements: American Civil War; Battle of Richmond; Vicksburg Campaign; Siege of Vicksburg; Siege of Jackson; Battle of Brice's Cross Roads; Battle of Nashville; Battle of Fort Blakeley

The 95th Ohio Infantry Regiment, was an infantry regiment that was a part of the Union Army consisting of civilians from the state of Ohio. It was formed in August 1862 as a response to the outbreak of the American Civil War, being mustered in for three years of service and to deter the Confederate Army and achieve the goals of the Union.

== History ==
=== American Civil War ===
Organised on August 19, 1862, under Colonel William L. McMillen, it proceeded to Kentucky and engaged in the Battle of Richmond where most of the regiment was captured. This was an utter disaster for the regiment, the men were eventually exchanged in November, and until May 1863 were kept at work in drill and reorganisation. After this, it moved to Memphis and then to Vicksburg where it participated in the Siege of Vicksburg accomplishing a victory. Later the regiment operated in Arkansas, and Missouri, and in December 1864, joined General Thomas at Nashville, Tennessee, participating in the Battle of Nashville that took place. It followed in the pursuit of Hood, and in March 1865, joined Canby at Mobile. After the evacuation, it moved north to Montgomery. The Regiment was finally mustered out on August 19, 1865, after sustaining a loss of over 500 men during its term of service.

=== Casualties ===
During its time of service, the regiment had suffered 1 officer and 58 enlisted men killed and mortally wounded, as well as 2 officers, and 215 enlisted men by disease. The overall casualty total is 276 individuals that served within the regiment.

== Structure ==
According to documentation and reports, the following structure of the regiment was as follows:

- Company A - consisted of many men from Franklin County, Ohio
- Company B - consisted of many men from Madison County, Ohio
- Company C
- Company D - consisted of many men from Franklin County, Ohio
- Company E - consisted of many men from Franklin, and Champaign County, Ohio
- Company F - consisted of many men from Champaign, Ohio, and Licking County, Ohio
- Company G - consisted of many men from Champaign County, Ohio
- Company H - consisted of many men from Franklin County, Ohio
- Company I
- Company K - consisted of many men from Madison County, Ohio

According to the Civil War Soldiers and Sailors database, it is able to list approximately c1700+ men on its roster for the 95th Ohio Infantry Regiment

== Commanders ==
- Colonel William L. McMillen
- Lieutenant Colonel Jefferson Brumback - commanded at the Battle of Nashville
- Lieutenant Colonel James B. Armstrong- served at the Battle of Richmond

== Notable members ==
- 1st Lieutenant Oliver Colwell, Company G - Medal of Honor recipient for action at the battle of Nashville, December 16, 1864
- Private Otis W. Smith, Company G - Medal of Honor recipient for action at the battle of Nashville, December 16, 1864
- Major William Robert Warnock - U.S. Representative from Ohio, 1901–1905; commander of the Ohio Grand Army of the Republic, 1913–1914

== See also ==
- List of Ohio Civil War units
- Ohio in the Civil War
