= Toensbergia =

Scientific classification
- Domain: Eukaryota
- Kingdom: Fungi
- Division: Ascomycota
- Class: Lecanoromycetes
- Order: Rhizocarpales
- Family: Sporastatiaceae
- Genus: Toensbergia; Bendiksby & Timdal (2013)

Type species
- Toensbergia leucococca (R.Sant.) Bendiksby & Timdal (2013)

Species
- T. blastidiata T. geminipara T. leucococca

Genus of lichen-forming fungi

Toensbergia is a small genus of lichen-forming fungi in the family Sporastatiaceae. These lichens form pale, granular crusts on moist soil, mossy rocks, and conifer bark, spreading primarily through powdery particles rather than sexual reproduction. The genus was established in 2013 and named after the Norwegian lichenologist Tor Tønsberg for his work on bark-dwelling lichens.

== Taxonomy ==
The genus was circumscribed by Mika Bendiksby and Einar Timdal in 2013. The genus name honours the Norwegian lichenologist Tor Tønsberg, "in appreciation of his important work on sorediate, corticolous lichens". The type species is Toensbergia leucococca, which was formerly classified in genus Hypocenomyce due to its resemblance (morphological, chemical, and ecological) to Hypocenomyce xanthococca.

== Description ==
Species of Toensbergia spread as pale granular crusts that can merge into extensive patches or, in sheltered spots, develop into slightly raised, scale-like lobes (subsquamulose thalli). Fresh material appears grey-white through cream to a faint green tint, depending on moisture and the density of the embedded green algal partner (a chlorococcoid photobiont with rounded cells). A separate hypothallus—the dark fungal fringe that rims many crustose lichens—is usually absent, but some specimens show a bluish-grey to charcoal border where the fungus grows beyond the photosynthetic layer. Asexual propagules dominate: powdery soredia erupt from tiny nipple-like bumps on the surface, while even finer, coral-shaped blastidia break away en masse, allowing the lichen to colonise nearby soil, mossy rock, or conifer bark without relying on sexual spores.

Sexual structures are rarely observed in this genus; when present, they are in the form of dark red to nearly black apothecia ringed by a conspicuous rim of thallus tissue (the thalline margin), sometimes with shallow scallops along the edge. Inside each fruit-body the epithecium—the tissue capping the spore layer—is reddish-brown, and the asci are club-shaped (clavate), each producing just two exceptionally large spores. These spores follow the Pertusaria pattern: they have walls so thick that two distinct layers are visible under a microscope and remain unpartitioned by internal cross-walls (aseptate). No separate flask-shaped conidiomata, which many lichens use for asexual conidia, have been found.

All known species synthesise alectorialic acid, a yellow-reacting compound that can be used to help confirm identifications through thin-layer chromatography.

== Ecology ==
Ecologically, Toensbergia favours substrates that stay moist yet well-lit—bare soil on woodland banks, moss-covered boulders, and the bark of conifer trunks are typical homes—where its powdery surface can disperse easily on wind or rain splash.

== Species ==
Genus Toensbergia comprises three accepted species:

- Toensbergia blastidiata T.Sprib. & Tønsberg (2020) – Alaska
- Toensbergia geminipara (Th.Fr.) T.Sprib. & Resl (2020)
- Toensbergia leucococca (R.Sant.) Bendiksby & Timdal (2013)
