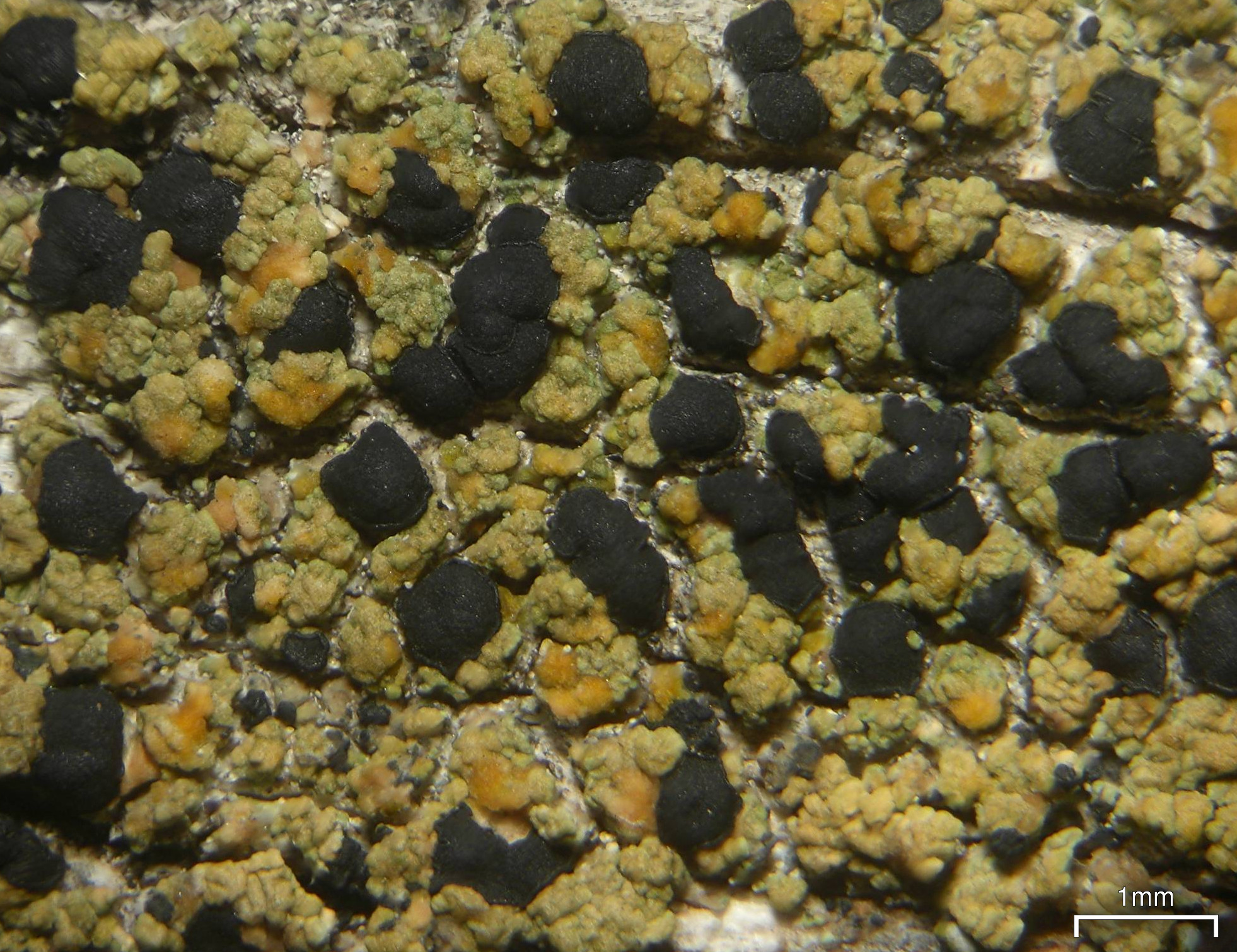
- Pycnora xanthococca

Scientific classification
- Domain: Eukaryota
- Kingdom: Fungi
- Division: Ascomycota
- Class: Candelariomycetes
- Order: Candelariales
- Family: Pycnoraceae; Bendiksby & Timdal (2013)
- Genus: Pycnora; Hafellner (2001)

Type species
- Pycnora xanthococca (Sommerf.) Hafellner (2001)

Species
- P. praestabilis P. sorophora P. xanthococca

= Pycnora =

Genus of lichen

Pycnora is a small genus of lichen-forming fungi in the monotypic family Pycnoraceae. The genus was established in 2001 by the Austrian lichenologist Josef Hafellner, who named it by combining references to its conspicuous black reproductive structures and its relationship to the lichen genus Lecanora. These wood-dwelling lichens form thin grey crusts on the smooth surfaces of dead wood in cool northern and mountain forests, where they colonise fallen tree trunks and branches that have lost their bark. The genus contains three species and is distinguished by its readily visible black fruiting bodies and the presence of alectorialic acid, a secondary metabolite not found in similar-looking lichens.

== Taxonomy ==
The three species now placed in Pycnora were long shuttled between other crustose genera. Lecidea xanthococca (1826) and the later Lecidea praestabilis and Lecidea xanthococca subsp. sorophora were all moved to Hypocenomyce during the mid-twentieth century, largely for want of a better classification. Yet their asci do not match the Bacidia-type architecture that defines Hypocenomyce; instead they bear the Lecanora-type euamyloid dome. Recognising this mismatch—as well as a distinct chemistry dominated by alectorialic acid derivatives—Josef Hafellner segregated the group in 1984, erecting the new genus Pycnora within the order Lecanorales and designating Pycnora xanthococca as its type species. The generic name combines "pycnidium", referring to the conspicuous asexual fruiting bodies, with "-nora" to signal kinship with Lecanora.

Pycnora differs from superficially similar crustose genera in a constellation of characters: readily visible black pycnidia, Lecanora-type asci, single-celled ellipsoid ascospores and the consistent occurrence of alectorialic acid in the thallus. These features separate it from Hypocenomyce, which has Bacidia-type asci and scalaradial chemistry, from Ramboldia, whose pycnidia are minute and whose secondary metabolites are β-orcinol derivatives, and from pycnidiate Cliostomum species that again have Bacidia-type asci.

The family Pycnoraceae was proposed by Mika Bendiksby and Einar Timdal in 2013 to accommodate this lineage. In their multilocus analysis the family emerged as the sister group to Candelariaceae, yet it differs in several clear ways: Pycnoraceae possesses black, lecideine apothecia that always contain eight spores per ascus, those spores are consistently single-celled, and the thallus chemistry is dominated by the dibenzofuran alectorialic acid. By contrast, members of Candelariaceae have yellow to orange lecanorine or biatorine apothecia, frequently bear many-spored asci with septate spores, and synthesise pulvinic acid derivatives. Bendiksby and Timdal fixed Pycnora as the type genus and accepted three species, thereby formalising a wood-inhabiting lineage within Lecanorales whose morphology, chemistry and phylogeny together justify recognition at family rank.

== Description ==
Pycnora forms a thin, tightly attached crust (a crustose thallus) on the smooth, weather-worn surfaces of dead wood. Its surface is usually pale to dark grey and lacks any leafy or shrubby lobes. Black, disc-shaped fruit bodies (apothecia) sit on the thallus and are framed by a narrow, slightly raised rim derived from the thallus itself (the thalline exciple). Scattered among them are equally black but more domed pycnidia – flask-shaped cavities that exude asexual spores – which are conspicuous enough to spot with a hand lens, a feature that immediately sets the genus apart from many lookalikes.

Under the microscope each apothecium reveals a hymenium (spore-bearing tissue) threaded by mostly unbranched paraphyses (sterile filaments). The asci are of the Lecanora-type: their dome-shaped apex stains blue in iodine (euamyloid) while the surrounding gelatinous matrix remains unaffected. Every ascus contains eight single-celled, colourless, oval ascospores. In the pycnidia, short spore-producing cells give rise to oblong to almost spherical conidia that cluster in a sticky mass before escaping through a tiny pore at the pycnidial tip.

Chemically, all known species synthesise alectorialic acid (present mainly as its benzyl ester), a compound absent from superficially similar genera such as Hypocenomyce, Ramboldia and Cliostomum. Together with the genus's crustose habit, Lecanora-type asci and readily visible pycnidia, this secondary metabolite provides a dependable set of characters for identification. Pycnora species are wood-inhabiting and are most often encountered in cool, boreal or montane forests where they colonise the bark-less surfaces of fallen trunks and decorticated branches.

== Species ==
Three species comprise the genus Pycnora:

- Pycnora praestabilis (Nyl.) Hafellner (2001)
- Pycnora sorophora (Vain.) Hafellner (2001)
- Pycnora xanthococca (Sommerf.) Hafellner (2001)

The taxon Pycnora leucococca (R.Sant.) R.Sant. (2004) has since been transferred to the genus Toensbergia as Toensbergia leucococca (R.Sant.) Bendiksby & Timdal (2013).
