= Tor Tønsberg =

Norwegian lichenologist (born 1948)

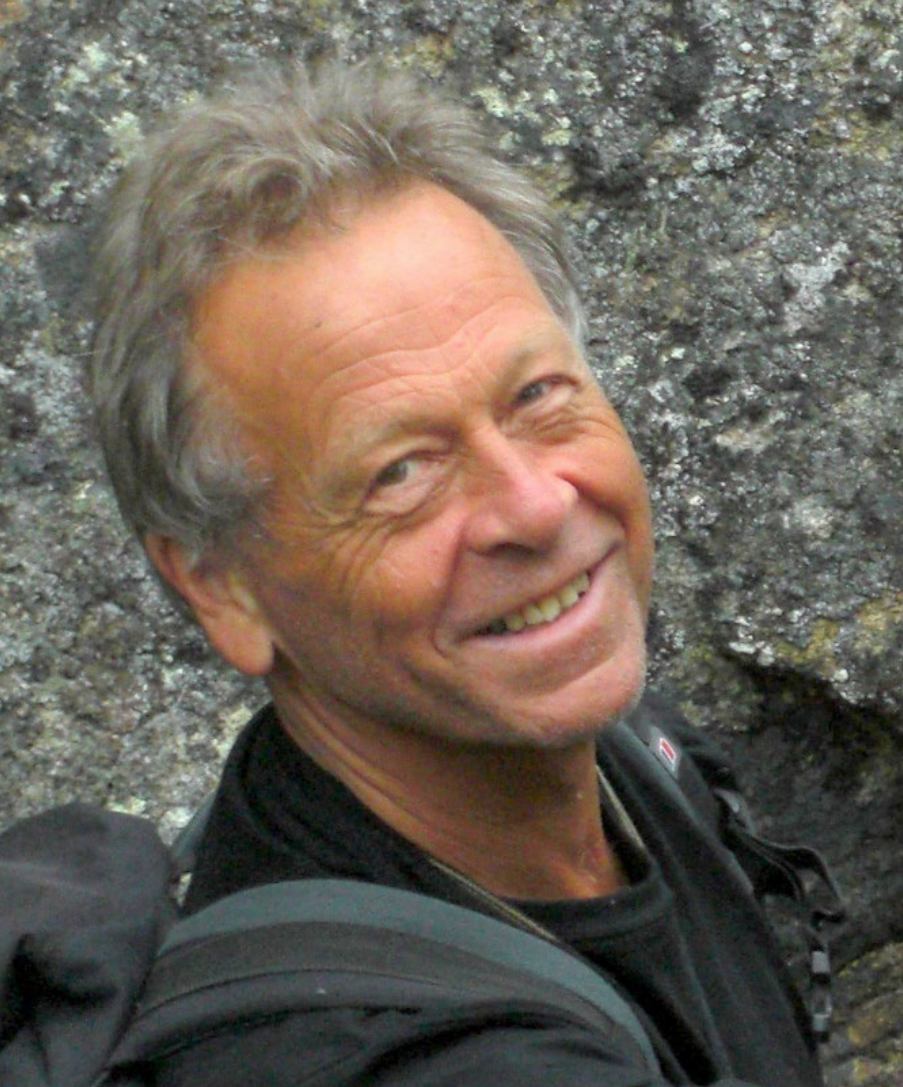
- Born: 1948 (age 77–78); Oslo, Norway
- Education: University of Oslo
- Scientific career
- Fields: Lichenology
- Workplaces: University of Trondheim; University of Bergen
- Author abbrev. (botany): Tønsberg

Tor Tønsberg (born 1948 in Oslo) is a Norwegian lichenologist who has made significant contributions to the taxonomy, chemistry, floristics, and phytogeography of lichens and lichenicolous fungi. Throughout his career, he has described more than one hundred species and genera new to science, advancing the knowledge of lichens in Europe and North America.

== Early life and education ==
Tønsberg grew up in Bekkelagshøgda, Nordstrand, in the eastern part of Oslo. He developed an early interest in nature, frequently visiting the nearby lake Østensjøvannet and the forests of Østmarka with his younger brother Knut. His systematic nature and passion for collecting began in childhood, where he organized a "museum" in the basement of his parents' house. Summers at his family's farm, Myrvang, in Majavatn in Grane Municipality in northern Norway, also played a significant role in fostering his love for the natural world. His grandfather, a frequent companion on hikes and fishing tours in the nearby Børgefjell National Park, was an influential figure in his early life.

Tønsberg began his studies in biology at the University of Oslo in 1966, eventually specialising in botany. His interest in lichens was sparked by a course taught by bryologist Per Størmer, which lead him to focus on this area for his Cand.real. thesis. He completed his degree in 1975 with a floristic and phytogeographic study of Børgefjell National Park, under the supervision of Professor Hildur Krog, a prominent Norwegian lichenologist. During his studies, he was introduced to thin-layer chromatography, a technique essential to his lichenological work.

== Career ==
In 1976, Tønsberg was appointed as a scientific assistant at the University of Trondheim, where he investigated the lichen-rich humid coastal spruce forests of Central Norway. His work in this region led to several discoveries, including the undescribed species Ramboldia subcinnabarina and Rinodina disjuncta.

In 1983, Tønsberg became the curator of cryptogamic plants at the University of Bergen. He focused on the study of sterile crustose lichens, earning his doctorate in 1996 with a thesis praised by Peter Wilfred James as "a Cadillac monograph". He was awarded a personal professorship in 1999.

Throughout his career, Tønsberg has made numerous significant contributions to lichenology. His research included the discovery of the endemic species Leioderma cherokeense in the Great Smoky Mountains and the identification of Collema leptaleum, a species previously unknown in Europe. He is particularly noted for his work on the genus Lepraria, naming several new species, including Lepraria bergensis.

Tønsberg has enriched herbaria with approximately 50,000 specimens and described numerous taxa, including the genus Japewia and Toensbergia, the latter named in his honour for his contributions to the study of sterile lichens.

He has mentored numerous master's and Ph.D. students throughout his tenure in Trondheim and Bergen.

Tønsberg has been actively involved in the Nordic Lichen Society, serving as president from 1992 to 1993 and from 2002 to 2003, managing editor for the scientific journal Graphis Scripta from 2005 to 2012, and a member of the editorial board for the Nordic checklist of lichens and lichenicolous fungi.

Tønsberg has also made significant contributions to the study of North American lichens, particularly the epiphytic lichen flora of the Pacific Northwest. His first trip to North America was in 1977 during the International Mycological Congress in Tampa, Florida. He has since collected lichens in various regions of North America, enriching the understanding of the lichen biodiversity of the continent. He has also collected lichens in the Canary Islands, where he has spent several weeks on holiday every winter for many years.

== Selected publications ==
Tønsberg has published extensively on lichens, contributing to the first Norwegian flora of macrolichens and an illustrated lichen flora. His research has been pivotal in assembling the first Norwegian survey of threatened macrolichens and numerous other publications documenting new species and their distributions. Some of his publications include:

- Tønsberg, T. (1992). The sorediate and isidiate, corticolous, crustose lichens in Norway. Sommerfeltia. Vol. 14. pp. 1–331. doi:10.2478/som-1992-0002. ISBN 82-7420-015-2.
- Tønsberg, T.; Gauslaa, Y.; Haugan, R.; Holien, H.; Timdal, E. (1996). The threatened macrolichens of Norway – 1995. Sommerfeltia. Vol. 23. pp. 1–258. doi:10.2478/som-1996-0002.
- Ekman, Stefan; Tønsberg, Tor (2002). "Most species of Lepraria and Leproloma form a monophyletic group closely related to Stereocaulon". Mycological Research. 106 (11): 1262–1276. doi:10.1017/S0953756202006718.
- Printzen, C.; Ekman, S.; Tønsberg, T. (2003). "Phylogeography of Cavernularia hultenii: evidence of slow genetic drift in a widely disjunct lichen". Molecular Ecology. 12 (6): 1473–1486. doi:10.1046/j.1365-294X.2003.01812.x. PMID 12755876.
- Holien, Håkon; Tønsberg, T. (2023). Norsk Lavflora [Norwegian Lichen flora] (in Norwegian) (3rd ed.). Fagbokforlaget. pp. 1–368. ISBN 9788245044362.

From 1997 to 1999, Tønsberg distributed 50 issues of the exsiccata series Lichenes isidiosi et sorediosi crustacei exsiccati ("Crustose lichens with isidia and soredia, dried").

== Recognition ==
The genus Toensbergia and several species have been named in honour of Tønsberg:

- Biatora toensbergii Holien & Printzen (1995)
- Topeliopsis toensbergii Kantvilas & Vězda (2000)
- Lepraria toensbergiana Bayerová & Kukwa (2005)
- Lepraria torii Pérez-Ortega & T.Spribille (2009)
- Acarospora toensbergii K.Knudsen & Kocourk. (2017)
- Sclerococcum toensbergii Diederich (2017)
- Arthonia toensbergii Holien & Frisch (2018)
- Lecidea toensbergii Haugan & Timdal (2018)
- Sticta torii Simon & Goward (2018)
- Diorygma toensbergianum Aptroot & M.Cáceres (2023)
- Psilolechia torii Palice, Svoboda & Vondrák (2023)

Lecidea toensbergii contains a unique lichen product named toensbergianic acid.

== See also ==
- Category:Taxa named by Tor Tønsberg
