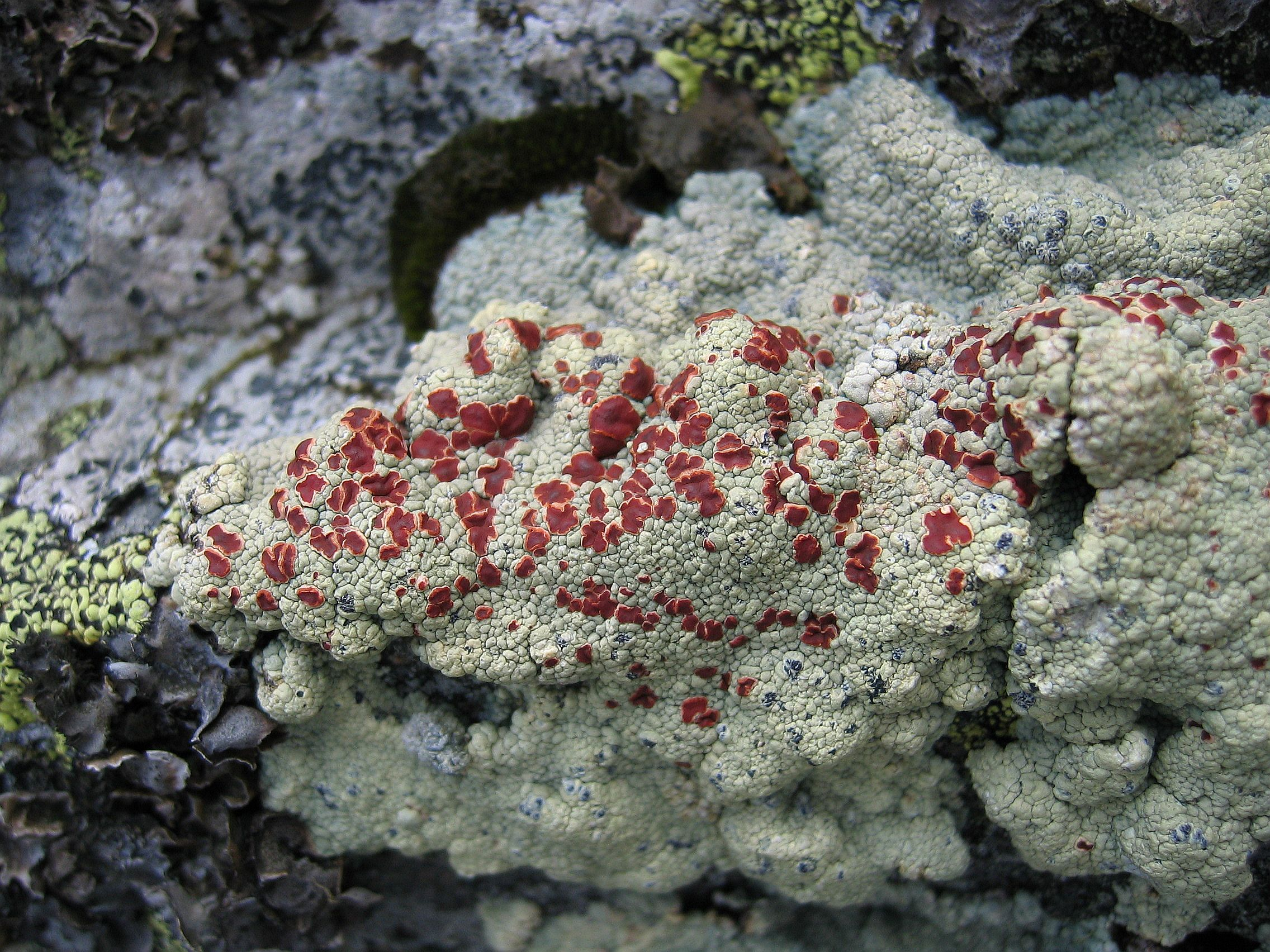
- Ophioparma ventosa

Scientific classification
- Kingdom: Fungi
- Division: Ascomycota
- Class: Lecanoromycetes
- Order: Umbilicariales
- Family: Ophioparmaceae; R.W.Rogers & Hafellner (1988)

Type genus
- Ophioparma Norman (1852)

Genera
- Boreoplaca; Hypocenomyce; Ophioparma

= Ophioparmaceae =

Family of lichen-forming fungi

The Ophioparmaceae are a small family of lichen-forming fungi in the order Umbilicariales.

== Taxonomy ==
The family was circumscribed in 1988 by the lichenologists Roderick Westgarth Rogers and Josef Hafellner.

== Description ==
Members of the family Ophioparmaceae are crustose or squamulose lichens, forming either thin, crust-like patches or collections of small, scale-like squamules. They do not produce isidia (tiny bud-like outgrowths), and soralia—the powdery patches of reproductive granules—are either absent or arise along the edges of the squamules. The photosynthetic partner is a green alga of the chlorococcoid type, meaning simple spherical cells of the genus Trebouxia and its allies.

The fruiting bodies are disc-like apothecia that sit directly on the thallus surface, usually red to black in colour and sometimes covered with a pale dusting (pruina). These discs are flat and may have a slightly wavy margin; the thalline margin, formed from thallus tissue, can be present or absent depending on the species. The apothecial wall (true exciple) is typically raised and persistent, though in some cases it becomes excluded as the apothecium ages. Internally, the spore-bearing tissue (hymenium) turns blue with iodine staining, a diagnostic reaction. The asci are cylindrical to club-shaped and usually contain eight ascospores, with a well-developed apical dome that also reacts blue in iodine, corresponding to the Biatora-type ascus.

The spores themselves are colourless and vary from simple, single-celled, ellipsoid to spindle-shaped forms, to much longer, multi-septate spores that are coiled helically inside the ascus. In addition to sexual reproduction, these lichens form pycnidia—small flask-shaped or rounded structures that produce asexual spores. The pycnidia may be black-walled or colourless, and release tiny, rod-like conidia. Chemically, the family is characterised by the production of orcinol depsides, especially lecanoric acid; some species also contain haemoventosin and other unidentified secondary metabolites.

== Genera ==
- Boreoplaca Timdal (1994) – 1 sp.
- Hypocenomyce M.Choisy (1951) – 3 spp.
- Ophioparma Norman (1852) – 9 spp.

The type specimen of Rhizoplacopsis weichingii has been shown to be identical with that of Boreoplaca ultrafrigida, so the genus Rhizoplacopsis has been subsumed into Boreoplaca.
