= William L. McMillen =

American politician (1829–1902)

William Linn McMillen
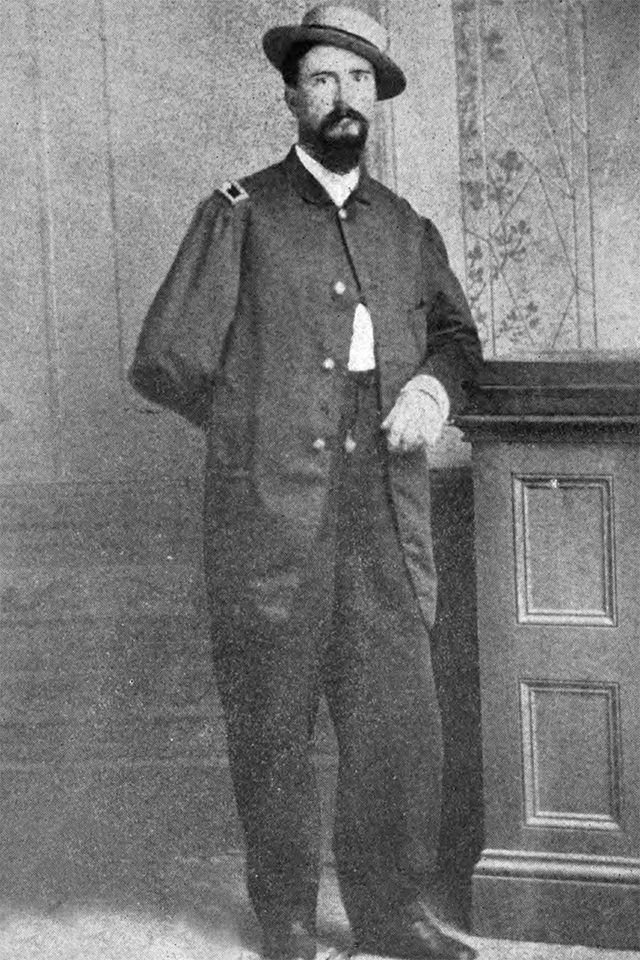
- Colonel William L. McMillen
- Born: October 18, 1829; Hillsboro, Ohio, U.S.
- Died: February 8, 1902 (aged 72); Columbus, Ohio, U.S.
- Burial place: Green Lawn Cemetery, Columbus, Ohio
- Military career
- Allegiance: Russian Empire; United States; Union
- Branch: Russian Army; Union Army
- Service years: 1861–1865 (US)
- Rank: Colonel; Brevet Major General
- Commands: 95th Ohio Infantry Regiment
- Conflicts: Crimean War; American Civil War

William Linn McMillen (October 18, 1829 – February 8, 1902) was an American surgeon, army officer, farmer and carpetbagger legislator.

== Biography ==
McMillen was born in Hillsboro, Ohio, on October 18, 1829. He graduated from Starling Medical College in 1852, and practiced medicine in Ohio. McMillen served as a surgeon with the Russian Army in the Crimean War, returning to Ohio in 1856. McMillen married Elizabeth I. King, née Neil, of Columbus, Ohio on April 18, 1861. On the outbreak of the American Civil War, he served as a surgeon with the 1st Ohio Volunteers in 1861, and as Surgeon General of the State of Ohio, 1861–2. He enlisted in the 95th Ohio Volunteer Infantry Regiment serving as colonel. He was wounded on August 30, 1862, in the Battle of Richmond, Kentucky. Accused of cowardly conduct during that engagement (in which he and about half the Union forces involved were captured), he was court-martialed, tried and acquitted after his release. McMillen led his brigade at the Battle of Nashville. After the Confederate General Thomas Benton Smith surrendered and had been disarmed during the engagement, McMillen berated the disarmed prisoner and then attacked General Smith with Smith's own sword (one source says "wantonly and repeatedly"), causing brain injuries sufficiently severe that Smith spent most of the rest of his life in a nearby state hospital for the insane. In Smith's obituary, it was stated that when McMillen's role in Smith's injuries became public knowledge, McMillen was asked to relinquish his office in the New Orleans chapter of the Grand Army of the Republic.

On December 12, 1864, President Abraham Lincoln nominated McMillen for appointment to the grade of brevet brigadier general of volunteers, to rank from December 16, 1864, and the United States Senate confirmed the appointment on February 14, 1865.

On March 2, 1867, President Andrew Johnson nominated McMillen for appointment to the grade of brevet major general of volunteers, to rank from March 13, 1865, and the United States Senate confirmed the appointment on March 2, 1867.

McMillen moved to Louisiana in 1866, and began planting cotton. A Republican, he served as a member of the 1868 Constitutional Convention, and as a state senator from 1870 to 1872. In 1872 and 1873, he was elected as a U.S. senator by the McEnery rump legislature, but was not admitted to that seat. He served as postmaster of New Orleans under Rutherford B. Hayes, and as Surveyor of the Port of New Orleans under Benjamin Harrison.

Upon his retirement, McMillen returned to Ohio. He died in Columbus, Ohio, on February 8, 1902, and was buried in Columbus's Green Lawn Cemetery.

== See also ==
- List of American Civil War brevet generals (Union)
