= Armstrong Redwoods State Natural Reserve =

State natural reserve in Sonoma County, California, United States

- IUCN category V (protected landscape/seascape)
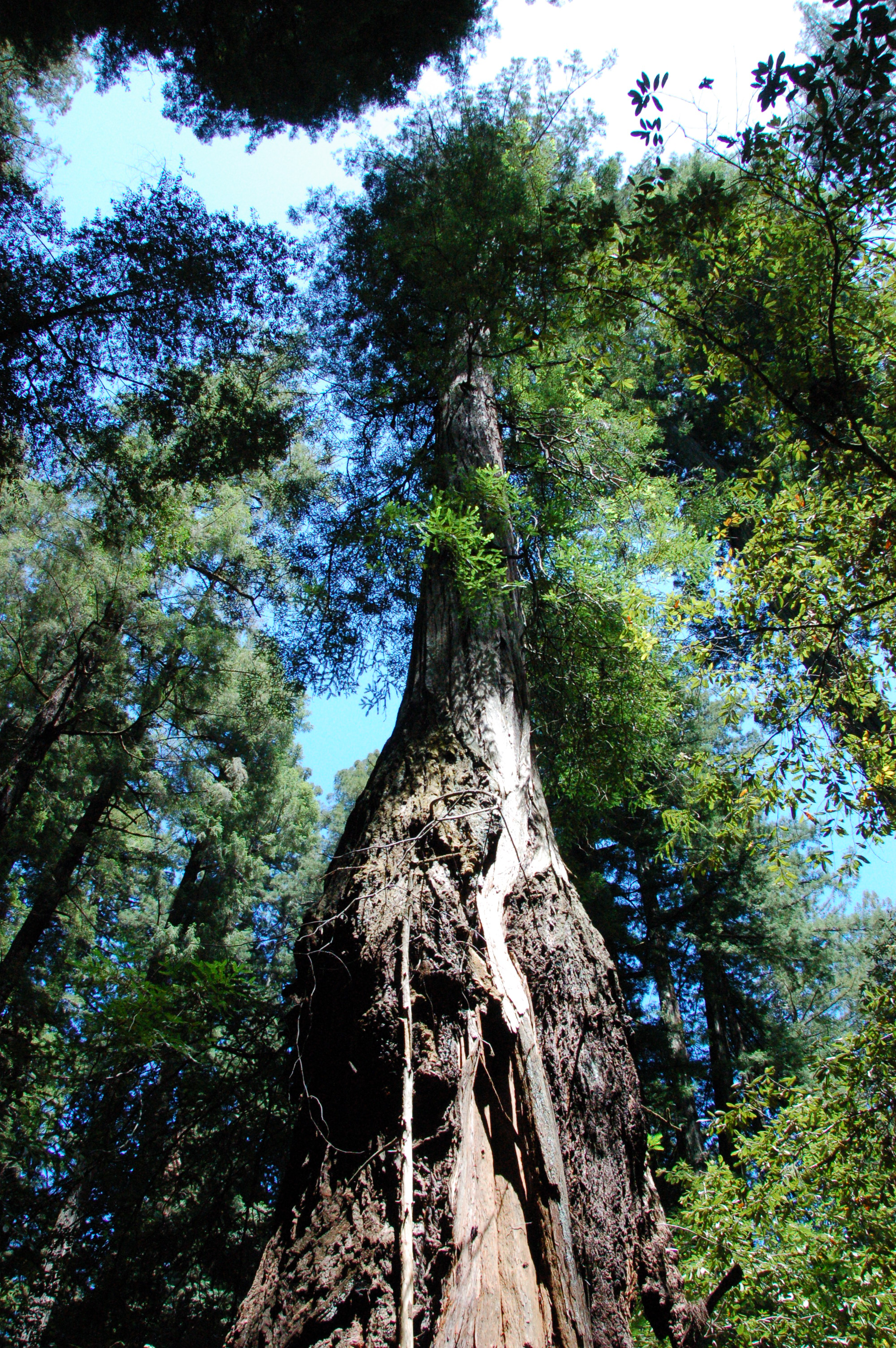
- One of the park's redwoods, the Icicle Tree

- Location within California Location within the United States
- Location: Sonoma County, California, United States
- Nearest city: Guerneville, California
- Coordinates: 38°32′17″N 123°0′36″W
- Area: 805 acres (326 ha)
- Established: 1934
- Governing body: California Department of Parks and Recreation

Armstrong Redwoods State Natural Reserve is a state park of California in the United States established to preserve 805 acres (326 ha) of coast redwoods (Sequoia sempervirens). The reserve is located in Sonoma County, just north of Guerneville. Part of the natural area is old-growth forest and recognized by the Old-Growth Forest Network.

The reserve is in a temperate rainforest. The climate is mild and wet. The park receives an average of 55 inches (1.4 m) of rainfall per year, almost all between September and June. Abundant fog during the summer months helps to maintain the moist conditions required by the coast redwoods.

== Notable trees ==
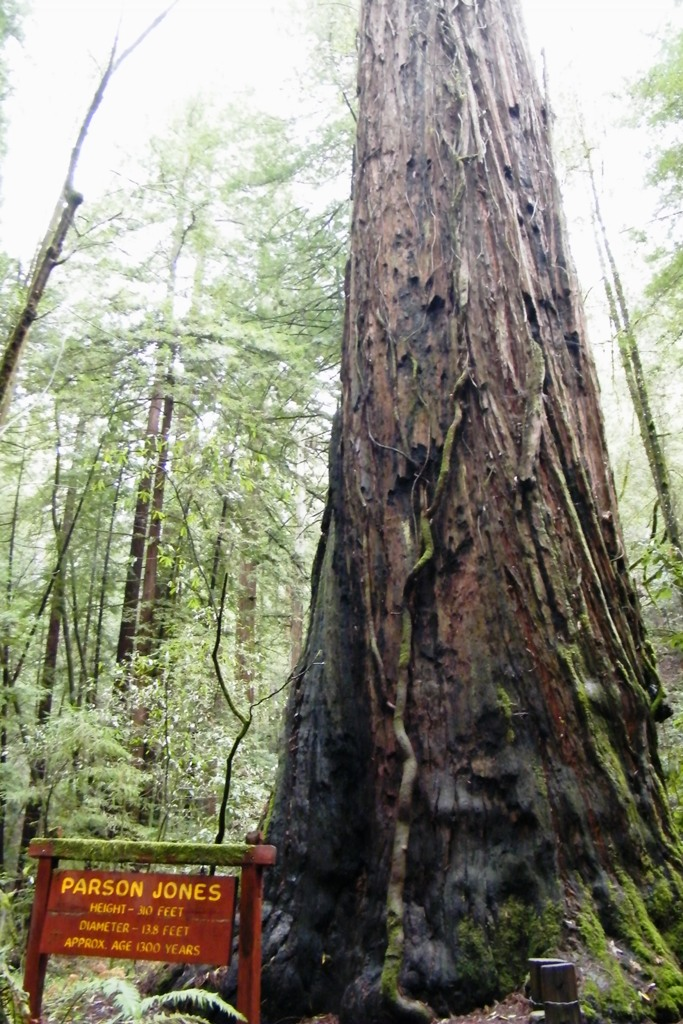
Parson Jones, the tallest tree in the reserve

The Parson Jones Tree is the tallest tree in the grove, measuring more than 310 feet (94 m) in height. It is about a 100-yard (91 m) walk from the park entrance.

The Colonel Armstrong Tree is the oldest tree in the grove, estimated to be over 1400 years old. It is a 0.5-mile (800 m) walk from the park entrance.

The Icicle Tree shows the unusual burl formations often found on redwood trees. Burls can weigh many tons and grow hundreds of feet above the forest floor. Why these growths occur remains a mystery.

== Recreation ==
The reserve includes a visitor center, outdoor amphitheater, self-guided nature trails, and a variety of picnic facilities. Although no camping is available in the redwood grove, there is a campground at Austin Creek State Recreation Area, which is adjacent to the park. Austin Creek is accessed through the same entrance as Armstrong Redwoods and its rolling hills, open grasslands, conifers, and oaks are a contrast to the dense canopy of the redwood grove.

The Discovery Trail offers a wheelchair accessible pathway, interpretive panels in Braille, and tree hugging platforms. The Armstrong Nature Trail is an easy stroll through the grove and is also wheelchair accessible. Guides are available at the visitor center.

The East Ridge Trail and the Pool Ridge Trail are open to equestrians, although there are seasonal closures due to poor trail conditions in some winter months. Horse rentals are available through a private company that is adjacent to Armstrong Redwoods.

== Park history ==
During the 1870s the area was set aside as a natural park and botanical garden by Colonel James Armstrong. After his death, Armstrong's daughter and the Le Baron family mounted an energetic campaign involving public meetings, rallies, and car-caravans to direct public attention to the need to preserve this last remnant of the once mighty redwood forest. Their efforts were successful, and in 1917 the County of Sonoma passed an initiative to purchase the property for $80,000.

The grove was operated by Sonoma County until 1934, when the state of California took over. In 1936 the grove was opened to the public as Armstrong Redwoods State Park. The grove's status was changed to a natural reserve in 1964 when a greater understanding of its ecological significance prompted a more protective management of the resource.

Armstrong Redwoods State Natural Reserve was one of 48 California state parks proposed for closure in January 2008 by Governor Arnold Schwarzenegger as part of a deficit reduction program. By May 2008 a temporary reprieve was granted, but the park's future is still uncertain.
