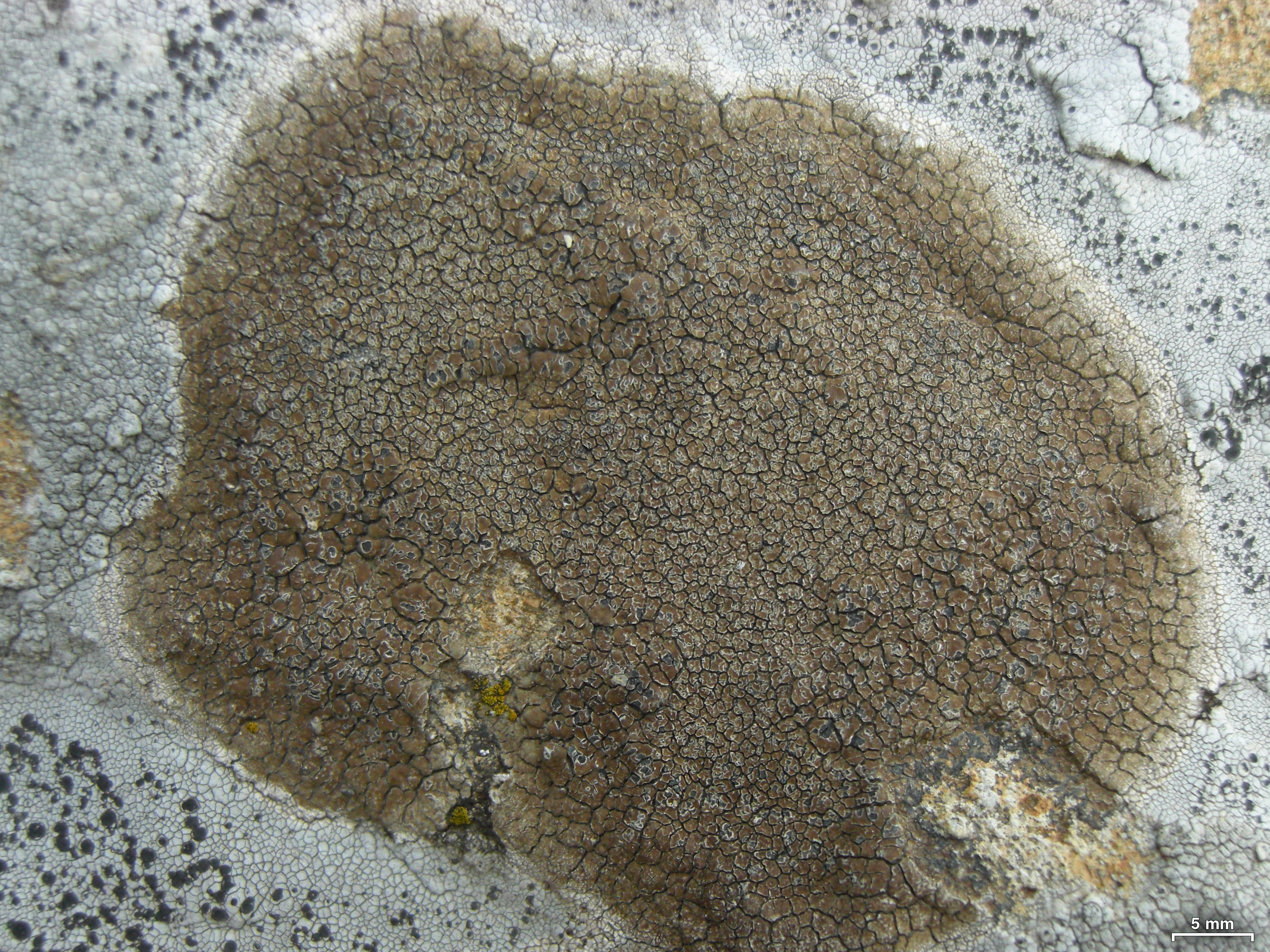
- Sporastatia testudinea in the Chiricahua Mountains, Arizona, US

Scientific classification
- Kingdom: Fungi
- Division: Ascomycota
- Class: Lecanoromycetes
- Order: Rhizocarpales
- Family: Sporastatiaceae; Bendiksby & Timdal (2013)

Genera
- Sporastatia; Toensbergia

= Sporastatiaceae =

Family of lichen-forming fungi

Sporastatiaceae is a small family of crustose lichens in the order Rhizocarpales. It contains two genera, Sporastatia and Toensbergia, with a total of five species. Sporastatiaceae was circumscribed in 2013 by Mika Bendiksby and Ernst Timdal.

== Description ==
Characteristics of species in family Sporastatiaceae include a crustose (crust-like) thallus with unicellular green algae as the photobiont partner, and lacking cephalodia. The apothecia are lecideine; this means they have a black exciple and blackish disc with a dark epihymenium. The ascus is narrowly club-shaped (clavate), containing several spores; it has a well-developed, deeply amyloid tholus (a thickened inner part of the apex). The ascospores are hyaline, and thin-walled, without a transparent coat (perispore) around them.

== Genera ==
- Sporastatia A.Massal (1854) – 4 spp.
- Toensbergia Bendiksby & Timdal (2013) – 1 sp.
