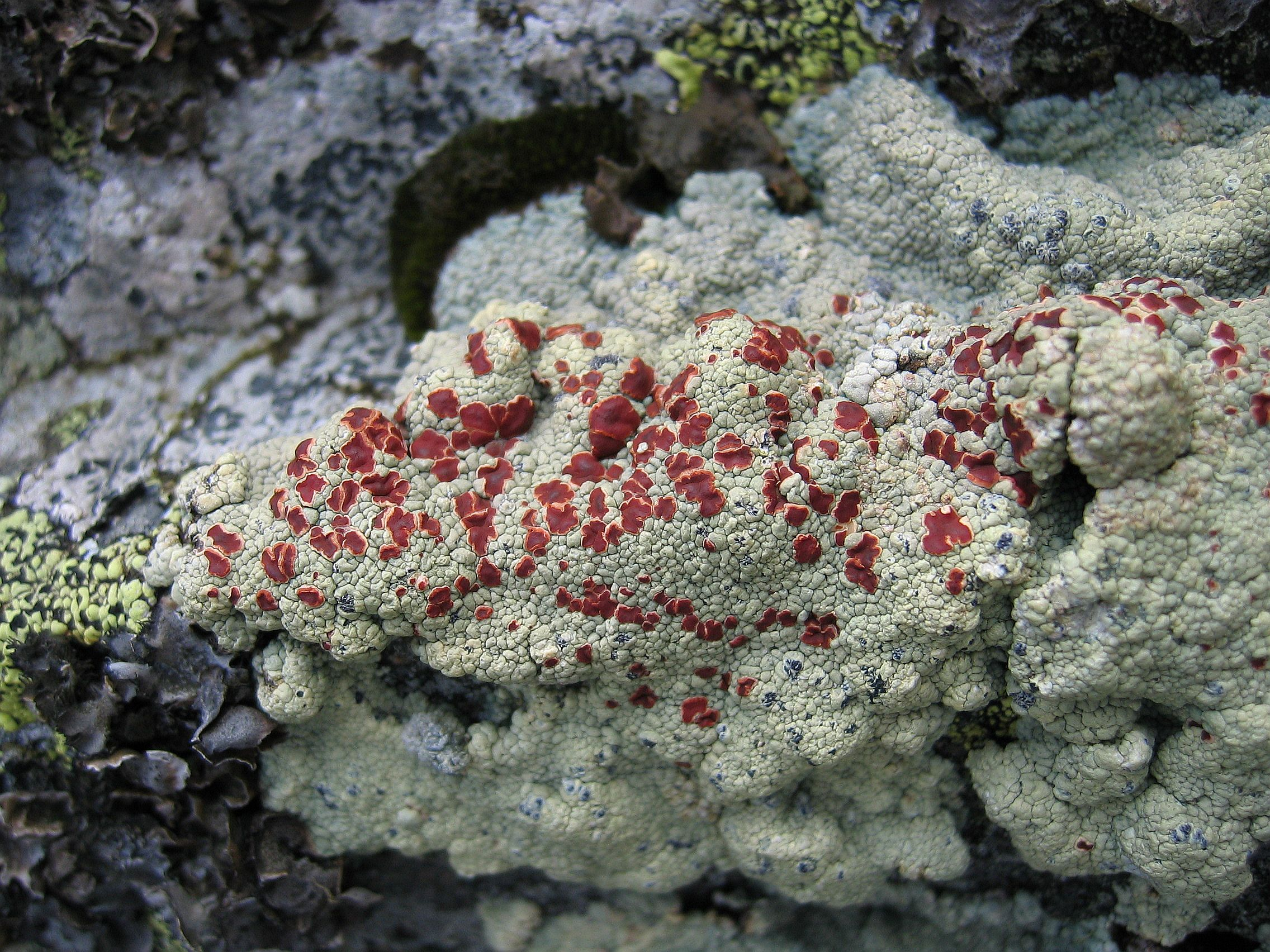
- Ophioparma ventosa

Scientific classification
- Kingdom: Fungi
- Division: Ascomycota
- Class: Lecanoromycetes
- Order: Umbilicariales
- Family: Ophioparmaceae
- Genus: Ophioparma; Norman (1852)

Type species
- Ophioparma ventosa (L.) Norman (1852)

Species
- O. handelii O. junipericola O. lapponica O. oxneri O. pruinosa O. ventosa

= Ophioparma =

Genus of lichen

Ophioparma is a genus of crustose lichens in the family Ophioparmaceae.

== Description ==
Species of Ophioparma are crustose lichens, forming a thin, corticate thallus that grows tightly attached to rock surfaces. The photosynthetic partner is a green alga of the trebouxioid type (minute, spherical algal cells commonly found in many lichen symbioses).

The fruiting bodies are disc-like apothecia, up to about 2 mm across, which sit directly on the thallus. Their discs are bright red, sometimes round but often slightly irregular in outline. A rim of thallus tissue (thalline margin) may or may not be present, while the apothecial wall (true exciple) is thick and matches the red colour of the disc. Inside, the apothecia contain a layer of paraphyses—slender supporting filaments that are only slightly swollen at the tips and rarely branched. The asci are club-shaped and typically hold eight ascospores. Their apical dome reacts blue in iodine staining but lacks the specialised apical chamber found in many other lichen asci. The ascospores are colourless, narrowly spindle-shaped, divided by several cross-walls, and often aligned in a helical arrangement within the ascus.

In addition to sexual reproduction, Ophioparma also produces tiny flask-like pycnidia, visible on the surface as black dots. These structures have mostly colourless walls but show a dark green zone around the opening (the ostiole) that gives a red reaction with nitrite. Inside, chains of cylindrical cells give rise to asexual spores (conidia), which are rod-shaped, single-celled, and colourless. Chemically, the genus is characterised by haemoventosin and various orcinol depsides, as well as aliphatic acids; some species also contain depsidones and terpenes.

== Species ==
As of September 2025, Species Fungorum (in the Catalogue of Life) accepts six species of Ophioparma:

- Ophioparma handelii (Zahlbr.) Printzen & Rambold (1996)
- Ophioparma junipericola I.Martínez & Aragón (2003) – Spain
- Ophioparma lapponica (Räsänen) Hafellner & R.W.Rogers (1988)
- Ophioparma oxneri (Vodopjanova) Sedeln. (2014)
- Ophioparma pruinosa Li S.Wang & Y.Y.Zhang (2018) – China
- Ophioparma ventosa (L.) Norman (1852)
