= Rhizocarpon flavomedullosum =

Scientific classification
- Kingdom: Fungi
- Division: Ascomycota
- Class: Lecanoromycetes
- Order: Rhizocarpales
- Family: Rhizocarpaceae
- Genus: Rhizocarpon
- Species: R. flavomedullosum

Binomial name
- Rhizocarpon flavomedullosum Elix & P.M.McCarthy (2014)

Species of lichen

Rhizocarpon flavomedullosum is a species of saxicolous (rock-dwelling), crustose lichen in the family Rhizocarpaceae. It is native to the Southern Tablelands of New South Wales and the nearby mountain tops in the southern Australian Capital Territory, where it grows on both exposed and sheltered siliceous rocks such as sandstone, schist, and granite.

== Taxonomy ==
Rhizocarpon flavomedullosum was described as a new species by the lichenologists John Elix and Patrick M. McCarthy in 2014. The holotype of this lichen was collected in the Southern Tablelands of New South Wales, specifically in the Badja State Forest, approximately 9 km (5.6 mi) northeast of Numeralla along the road to Jerangle, at an elevation of 1,095 m (3,593 ft). The specimen was found on sandstone within an open Eucalyptus woodland. This specimen is permanently housed at the Australian National Herbarium (CANB).

The specific epithet, flavomedullosum, is derived from Latin, where flavo- means yellow and -medullosum pertains to the medulla—the innermost layer of the thallus. This name highlights the distinctively intense yellow colour of the upper medulla of the lichen, which is a key identifying characteristic. This vivid colouration is due to the presence of rhizocarpic acid, a compound rarely observed in the genus Rhizocarpon.

== Description ==
Rhizocarpon flavomedullosum has a crustose, epilithic, and areolate thallus that appears grey to dark grey and measures 1–3 cm wide and 0.05–0.2 mm thick. The individual areoles are contiguous, angular, and irregularly shaped, ranging from 0.1 to 0.5 mm in width, typically with slightly raised edges. The upper cortex is poorly defined, approximately 10 μm thick, covering a hyaline necral layer. The algal layer is continuous, with green, roughly spherical, chlorococcoid cells measuring 8–15 μm in diameter. The medulla is thick, non-amyloid, and intensely yellow in the upper section, transitioning to white below. The thallus's edges are defined by a prominent, marginal, black prothallus.

Apothecia (fruiting bodies) are common in this species, appearing dull black and ranging from 0.25 to 0.64 mm in width. They are lecideine in form, initially immersed but becoming broadly adnate, with a black, epruinose disc that is either plane or markedly convex. The asci are cylindrical to club-shaped (clavate), containing eight spores each. Ascospores are dark green-blue to dark brown, 1-septate, narrowly ellipsoid, and 14–21 by 6–10 μm in size, with a distinctive verrucose ornamentation. Pycnidia are common but immersed and black.

The species is chemically characterised by the presence of rhizocarpic acid in the medulla, which contributes to its intense yellow colour. Spot tests on the thallus yield reactions of K+ (yellow), C−, KC−, and P+ (yellow) in the cortex, and K− or K+ (pale pink), C−, KC−, P− in the medulla.

== Similar species ==
Rhizocarpon flavomedullosum is comparable to several other species within its genus. While it shares some morphological traits with R. geminatum, such as the presence of rhizocarpic acid in the medulla, the latter has a darker, more robust thallus, larger apothecia, and primarily two-spored asci. R. sulphurosum from north-western North America also features a yellow medulla, but differs in having peltate areoles with pale margins and larger, 3-septate to muriform ascospores. Another similar species, R. superficiale, contains similar dark, single-septum ascospores but differs in its green-yellow thallus, larger areolae, and the presence of rhizocarpic and stictic or perlatolic acids.
