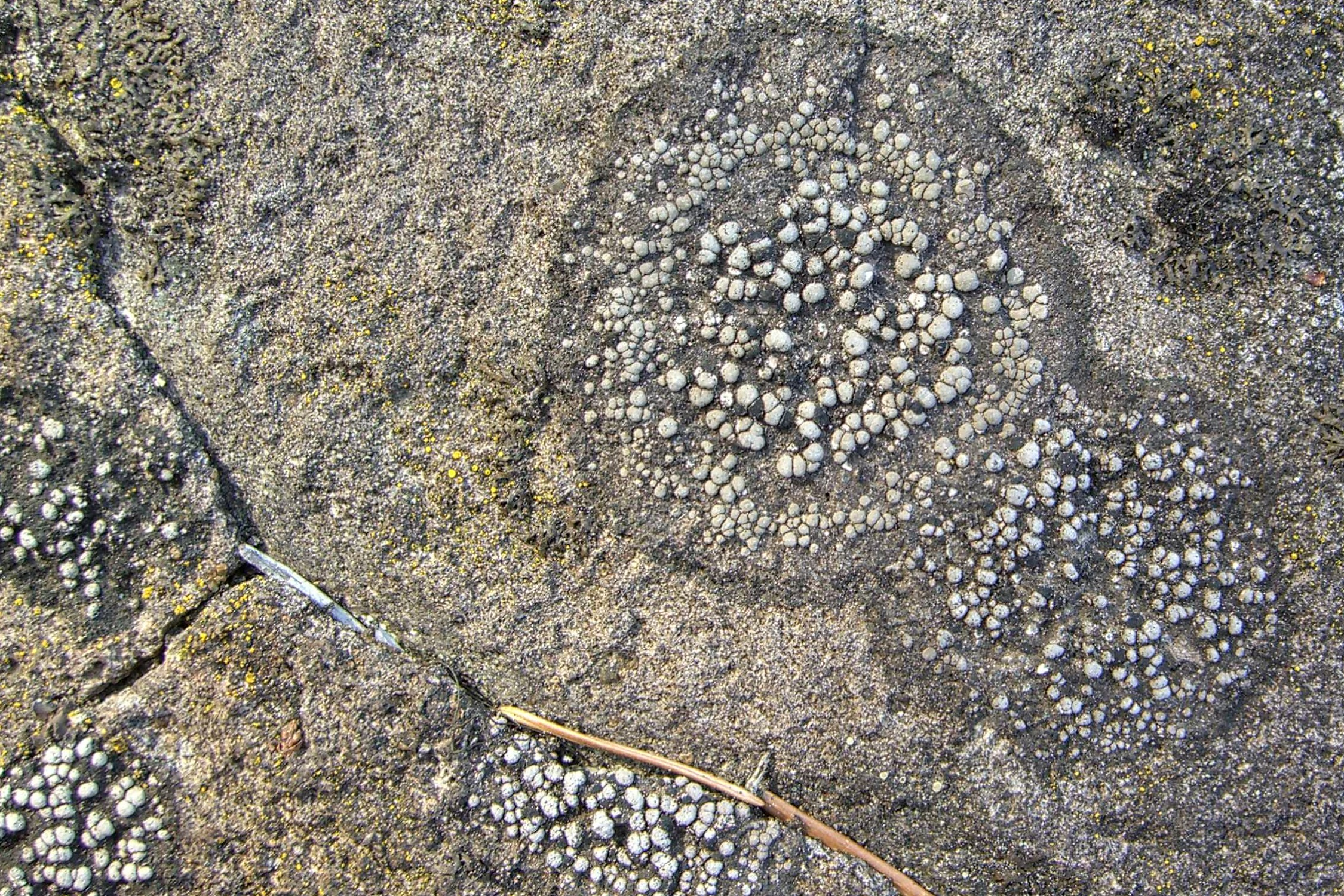

Conservation status
- Apparently Secure (NatureServe)

Scientific classification
- Kingdom: Fungi
- Division: Ascomycota
- Class: Lecanoromycetes
- Order: Rhizocarpales
- Family: Rhizocarpaceae
- Genus: Rhizocarpon
- Species: R. eupetraeum

Binomial name
- Rhizocarpon eupetraeum (Nyl.) Arnold (1871)

Synonyms
- Lecidea eupetraea Nyl. (1870)

= Rhizocarpon eupetraeum =

Species of lichen

Rhizocarpon eupetraeum is a species of saxicolous (rock-dwelling), crustose lichen in the family Rhizocarpaceae.

== Taxonomy ==
It was first formally described as a new species in 1870 by the Finnish lichenologist William Nylander, who originally classified it in the genus Lecidea. Nylander's original short description characterises its key distinguishing features from the similar species L. petraea (now Rhizocarpon petraeum), including details about its thallus colouration when treated with potassium hydroxide solution (the K spot test), spore characteristics, and geographic distribution in Scandinavia. Ferdinand Arnold transferred the taxon to the genus Rhizocarpon the following year.

== Description ==
Rhizocarpon eupetraeum is a crustose lichen that forms thin, patchy growths on rock surfaces. Its thallus is tightly attached to the substrate (episubstratic) and varies in colour from whitish-grey to grey, occasionally appearing pale brown. It is divided into small, contiguous sections called areoles, which measure between 0.3 and 1.4 mm in width and 0.4 to 0.8 mm in thickness. These areoles are strongly convex, giving the lichen a bumpy appearance, and have a smooth, matt surface. The thallus is bordered by a distinct dark prothallus, and individual colonies can reach a diameter of 2–6 cm. The medulla, the inner tissue of the thallus, is white and reacts with iodine (I+) by staining blue.

The reproductive structures, or apothecia, are lecideine, meaning they have a black, rounded disc without a distinct pale rim. These apothecia range from 0.3 to 1.5 mm in diameter, and their discs become convex with age. The outer tissue layer (epithecium) is brown to nearly black and reacts strongly red with potassium hydroxide solution (K+), though in some cases it may not react. Beneath this, the hymenium—the spore-producing layer—is colourless and measures 100–160 μm in height. The hypothecium, the supportive layer beneath the hymenium, is brown.

The lichen produces eight-spored asci of the Rhizocarpon type, which are club-shaped (clavate), fissitunicate (splitting open in a specific way during spore release), and contain a well-developed inner structure (tholus) but lack an ocular chamber. The ascospores are muriform, meaning they have multiple internal divisions, giving them a many-celled appearance. These spores are dark brown to nearly black and measure 19–40 by 10–18 μm.

Asexual reproductive structures called pycnidia are also present, appearing as small black spheres either embedded in the thallus or forming on the prothallus. These structures produce conidia, which are slender, colourless (hyaline) spores measuring 8–14 by 0.5–1.4 μm.

The lichen's symbiotic partner is a green alga from the chlorococcoid group, which provides it with photosynthetic energy. Chemical spot tests on the medulla yield a yellow reaction with potassium hydroxide (K), which then turns red, while other tests (C, KC) show no reaction, and the reaction with para-phenylenediamine (P) is a pale yellow. The main secondary metabolite present in R. eupetraeum is norstictic acid.

== Habitat and distribution ==
In Alberta's Banff National Park, a survey of the Jonas Rockslide region revealed that Rhizocarpon eupetraeum occupied just over one percent of the rock surfaces, despite the area's abundant lichen coverage of 87%. This species showed a particular preference for steep rock faces.
