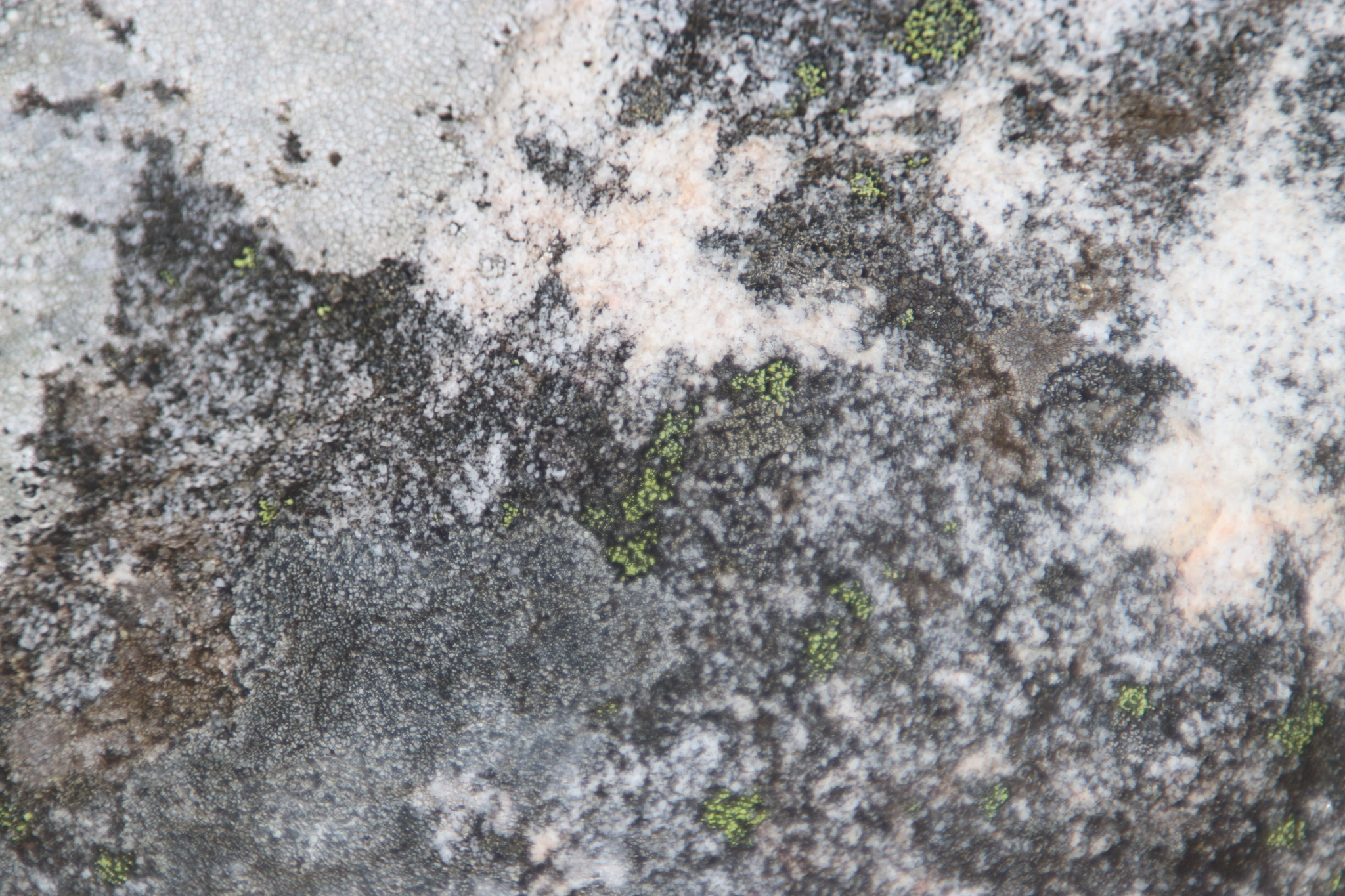

Scientific classification
- Kingdom: Fungi
- Division: Ascomycota
- Class: Lecanoromycetes
- Order: Rhizocarpales
- Family: Rhizocarpaceae
- Genus: Rhizocarpon
- Species: R. viridiatrum

Binomial name
- Rhizocarpon viridiatrum (Wulfen) Körb. (1855)

Synonyms
- Lichen viridi-ater Wulfen (1791); Buellia viridiatra (Wulfen) H.Olivier (1901); Diplotomma viridiatrum (Wulfen) Jatta (1900)

= Rhizocarpon viridiatrum =

Species of lichen

Rhizocarpon viridiatrum is a species of saxicolous (rock-dwelling), crustose lichen in the family Rhizocarpaceae. The species is characterized by its distinctive yellowish-green colouration due to rhizocarpic acid and its parasitic lifestyle, initially growing on other crustose lichens before becoming independent. It forms small, compact thalli rarely exceeding 2 cm across, composed of tiny areoles with scattered black fruiting bodies. The lichen is found across Europe, typically inhabiting siliceous to moderately calcareous rock surfaces such as basalt.

== Taxonomy ==
It was first described by Franz Xaver von Wulfen as Lichen viridi-ater in 1791. Wulfen characterized the species as a powdery, crust-forming lichen with small bumps, pale yellowish-green in colour, and bearing small, somewhat shield-like blackish fruiting bodies. He noted finding the species on the shaded rocky cliffs of Kalvarienberg (Mount Calvary) in Styria, distinguishing it from Lichen geographicus (now Rhizocarpon geographicum) and noting that it should not be confused with earlier descriptions. Gustav Wilhelm Körber transferred the taxon to the genus Rhizocarpon in 1855.

== Description ==
Rhizocarpon viridiatrum starts life on the surface of other crust-forming lichens, gradually replacing its host and sometimes etching a shallow pit where the first thallus erodes. Even when self-sustaining it remains compact, rarely spreading beyond 2 cm across. The thallus is broken into tiny platelets—or areoles—up to about 1 mm wide. These areoles are matt green-yellow thanks to rhizocarpic acid, lie flush with the rock or rise into little domes, and fit together like pieces of cracked paint. A black prothallus—an advance fringe of fungal threads—is usually absent but may show as a thin dark line around the edge. The internal white layer (medulla) shows no blue staining reaction with iodine (I–), a quick test used to check for starch-like compounds.

Scattered across the thallus are black fruit-bodies (apothecia) up to 1 mm in diameter. They begin flat but often swell into glossy mounds that sit slightly above the surrounding areoles. The protecting rim derived from the thallus (the true exciple) soon wears away so that the apothecial disc appears rimless; in thin section its outer cells are brown-black, fading inward, and give a faint purple tint when touched with potassium hydroxide solution (K test). The cap of tissue over the spore layer (epithecium) is similarly dark and reacts the same way. Beneath, the transparent hymenium produces eight large ascospores per ascus. These spores measure 17–32 × 10–16 μm and are muriform—subdivided by several cross-walls that give a brick-like pattern; they turn a deep brown on maturity. Simple spot tests of the medulla are negative with bleach (C−), potassium hydroxide (K−), and para-phenylenediamine (Pd−), indicating only rhizocarpic and some unidentified fatty acids are present.

== Habitat and distribution ==
Rhizocarpon viridiatrum occurs across Central Europe, with confirmed records from Austria, the Czech Republic, Germany, Hungary, and Poland. Within this range, the species is considered rare and is classified as vulnerable on Poland's Red List of lichens. Polish populations are documented from the Baltic Lakelands (Pojezierza Bałtyckie) and Western Carpathians (Karpaty Zachodnie), whilst historical collections from the Sudeten Mountains in southwestern Poland have not been confirmed in recent surveys.

Rhizocarpon viridiatrum colonizes siliceous to moderately calcareous substrates such as basalt, beginning as a parasite on other crustose lichens, particularly Circinaria caesiocinerea. It typically inhabits exposed, well-lit locations that receive relatively warm conditions despite the rocky substrate. The species typically appears as dispersed fragments or small sections interspersed among other lichen communities.
