= Rhizocarpon smaragdulum =

Scientific classification
- Domain: Eukaryota
- Kingdom: Fungi
- Division: Ascomycota
- Class: Lecanoromycetes
- Order: Rhizocarpales
- Family: Rhizocarpaceae
- Genus: Rhizocarpon
- Species: R. smaragdulum

Binomial name
- Rhizocarpon smaragdulum Davydov & Yakovchenko (2014)

Species of lichen

Rhizocarpon smaragdulum is a species of crustose lichen belonging to the genus Rhizocarpon in the family Rhizocarpaceae. It was first identified and formally described by Evgeny Davydov and Lidia Yakovchenko in 2014, with the type specimen collected in the Altai Mountains. Characteristics of the lichen include its distinct yellow thallus with greenish patches and a unique reproductive feature of producing a single spore per ascus.

== Taxonomy ==
The species was formally described based on a specimen collected from the Mongun-Taiga massif in Russia. The specific epithet smaragdulum refers to the emerald-like green patches observed on the thallus.

== Description ==
Rhizocarpon smaragdulum has a yellow thallus that contains rhizocarpic acid and has an areolate to somewhat squamulose (scaly) surface. The areoles are flat to convex, ranging in diameter from 0.2 mm to 1.8 mm. The upper cortex is yellow with patches of green and is epruinose to faintly pruinose. This species is unique in having a single, eumuriform, hyaline ascospore per ascus. Apothecia (fruiting bodies) are black, lecideine in form, and range from 0.2 mm to 1.0 mm in diameter.

== Distribution and habitat ==
Rhizocarpon smaragdulum is primarily found in the Altai Mountains, growing in alpine environments above the tree line, typically on siliceous rocks in wet conditions. Its known range is limited to a few cold, mountainous, high-elevation sites in Siberia. This lichen is adapted to high-altitude ecological niches, often dominating the lichen community in these areas. It grows on exposed granite boulders where moisture accumulates.
