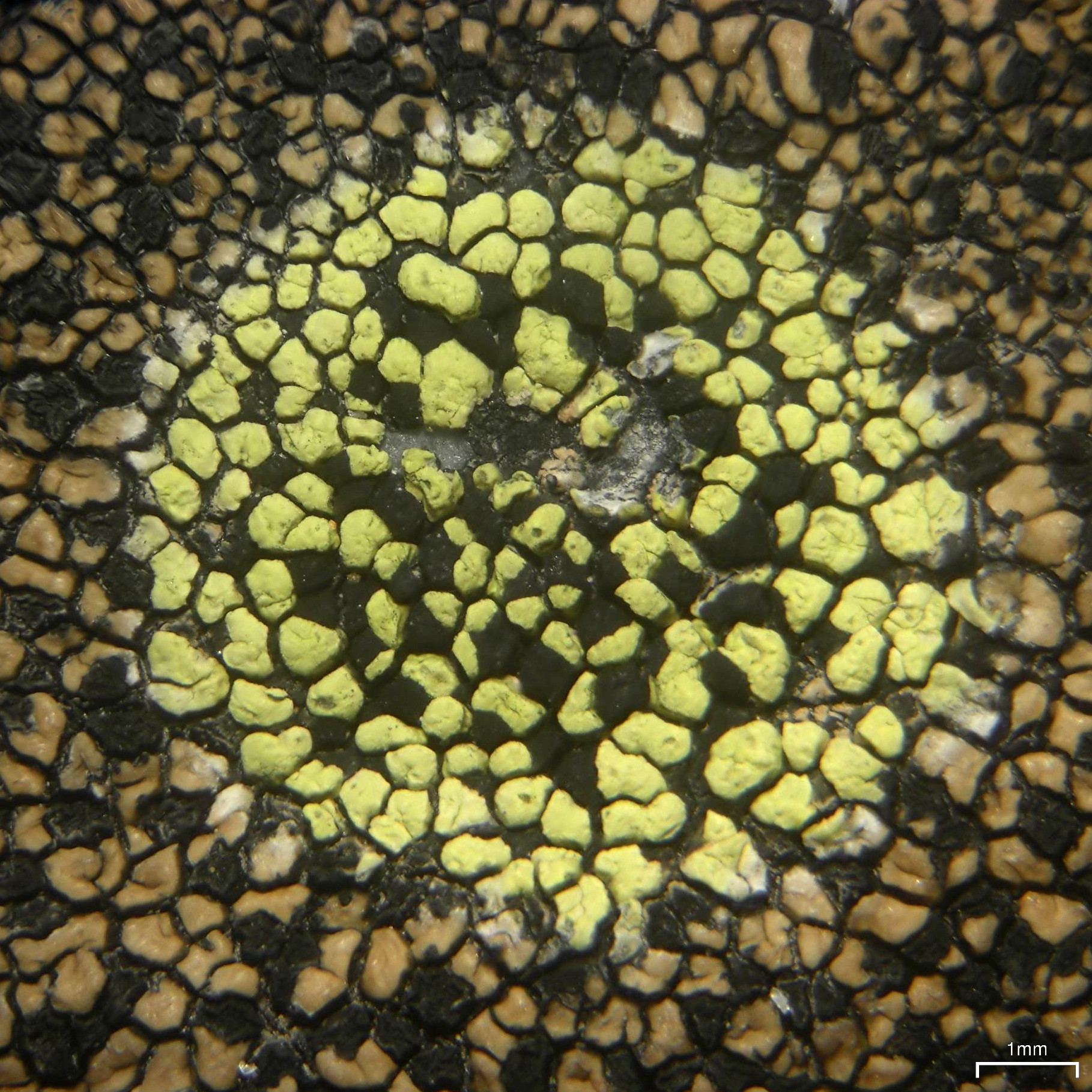

Conservation status
- Apparently Secure (NatureServe)

Scientific classification
- Kingdom: Fungi
- Division: Ascomycota
- Class: Lecanoromycetes
- Order: Rhizocarpales
- Family: Rhizocarpaceae
- Genus: Rhizocarpon
- Species: R. pusillum

Binomial name
- Rhizocarpon pusillum Runemark (1956)

Synonyms
- Catocarpus pusillum (Runemark) Oxner (1968)

= Rhizocarpon pusillum =

Species of lichen

Rhizocarpon pusillum is a species of saxicolous (rock-dwelling), crustose lichen in the family Rhizocarpaceae. It is a lichenicolous lichen, meaning it is parasitic on other lichens. It was formally described as a new species in 1956 by the Swedish lichenologist Hans Runemark.
