= Rhizocarpon diploschistinum =

Scientific classification
- Domain: Eukaryota
- Kingdom: Fungi
- Division: Ascomycota
- Class: Lecanoromycetes
- Order: Rhizocarpales
- Family: Rhizocarpaceae
- Genus: Rhizocarpon
- Species: R. diploschistinum

Binomial name
- Rhizocarpon diploschistinum McCune (2011)

Species of lichen

Rhizocarpon diploschistinum is an uncommon species of lichenicolous (lichen-dwelling), crustose lichen in the family Rhizocarpaceae. It parasitises the lichen Diploschistes muscorum. It is distinguished from similar species by its distinctive yellow thallus and presence of rhizocarpic acid. This lichen has been found in shrub steppe and grasslands in central Washington and north-central Oregon, USA.

== Taxonomy ==
Rhizocarpon diploschistinum was first scientifically described by the lichenologist Bruce McCune as a new species in 2011. The type specimen was collected in Gilliam County, Oregon. The species epithet refers to its obligate host, Diploschistes.

== Description ==
The thallus of Rhizocarpon diploschistinum is areolate and varies in colour from very pale yellowish-tan to an intense fluorescent yellow. It forms small yellow mounds of areoles on Diploschistes, with the areoles initially appearing as a yellowing surface and later protruding as a convex mound with a diffuse margin. The apothecia are black and lack a thalline margin, reaching about 1 mm in diameter. The ascospores are dark brown, 16–18 by 7–8 μm, and mostly 4-celled, with the septation and outline often slightly asymmetrical or irregular. The secondary chemistry of Rhizocarpon diploschistinum includes rhizocarpic acid, and its cortex has a UV+ (orange) reaction.

=== Similar species ===
Rhizocarpon diploschistinum is similar in appearance to Rhizocarpon malenconianum, but the latter species lacks a distinct thallus and has a different host, Diploschistes diacapsis. Rhizocarpon diploschistinum is also similar to Epilichen scabrosus, which grows on Baeomyces rather than Diploschistes. The spores of Epilichen are 2-celled, while those of Rhizocarpon diploschistinum are usually 4-celled and thickly halonate.

== Habitat and distribution ==
Rhizocarpon diploschistinum has been found exclusively in shrub steppe and grasslands in central Washington and north-central Oregon in the United States. It grows on Diploschistes muscorum, which is typically found on soil and grass stubble in areas with well-developed biotic crusts and minimal grazing.
