= Rhizocarpon haidense =

Scientific classification
- Domain: Eukaryota
- Kingdom: Fungi
- Division: Ascomycota
- Class: Lecanoromycetes
- Order: Rhizocarpales
- Family: Rhizocarpaceae
- Genus: Rhizocarpon
- Species: R. haidense

Binomial name
- Rhizocarpon haidense Brodo & Fryday 2020

Species of lichen

Rhizocarpon haidense is a species of crustose lichen in the family Rhizocarpaceae. It is found in Haida Gwaii, British Columbia, Canada. This lichen forms a thin, creamy to pale-brown crust made up of tiny angular patches, with numerous conspicuous black button-like fruiting bodies scattered across its surface. It was discovered in 2020 growing on rocks at the base of a cliff near the beach on Moresby Island, and its name references its type locality in Haida Gwaii.

== Taxonomy ==
The lichen was described as a new species in 2020 by the lichenologists Irwin Brodo and Alan Fryday. The type specimen was collected from the Skincuttle Inlet area of Moresby Island (Haida Gwaii, British Columbia). Here it was found on the edge of a beach, growing on a rock at the base of a cliff. The specific epithet haidense references the type locality in Haida Gwaii.

DNA sequences of R. haidense were used in a 2024 molecular analysis of lichen species from Horseshoe Island, Antarctica; it was determined to have a sister relationship with R. reductum.

== Description ==
Rhizocarpon haidense spreads as a thin, crust-like growth (the thallus) that blankets its rocky home in a patchwork of tiny, creamy to pale-brown polygons. These angular patches (areoles), are only 0.3–0.4 mm wide and rise just enough to look slightly domed. Unlike many crustose lichens, they lack an outer skin (cortex), so the surface merges directly into the inner tissue (medulla). Under a hand lens the medulla is packed with microscopic crystals; a drop of potassium hydroxide solution (the common K-spot test) dissolves the crystals and turns the solution bright yellow. The lichen's photosynthetic partner (photobiont) is a green alga with spherical cells 7–12 μm across.

The sexual fruiting bodies (apothecia) are plentiful and conspicuous. Each is a black, button-like disc 0.4–0.7 mm in diameter that lies level with, or slightly above, the thallus surface. A thin, paler rim surrounds the disc and persists with age. Inside, the cup wall (exciple) is made of colourless, radially arranged cells that, like the medulla, are laden with K-soluble crystals. The clear spore-bearing layer (hymenium) stands 90–100 μm tall and is threaded by slender, scarcely branched filaments (paraphyses). Beneath it sits a dark-brown support tissue (hypothecium). The spore sacs (asci) are of the Rhizocarpon type, slightly club-shaped (50–60 × 15–18 μm) and each holds eight transparent, two-celled ascospores that average 17 × 8 μm; the septum only slightly pinches the spore's waist, and both ends are evenly rounded. No asexual reproductive structures have been observed.

Standard chemical spot tests on the thallus give K+ (yellow), PD+ (orange) and C− reactions, indicating the presence of the lichen substances stictic and constictic acids, sometimes accompanied by a trace of norstictic acid and several unidentified compounds revealed by thin-layer chromatography.
