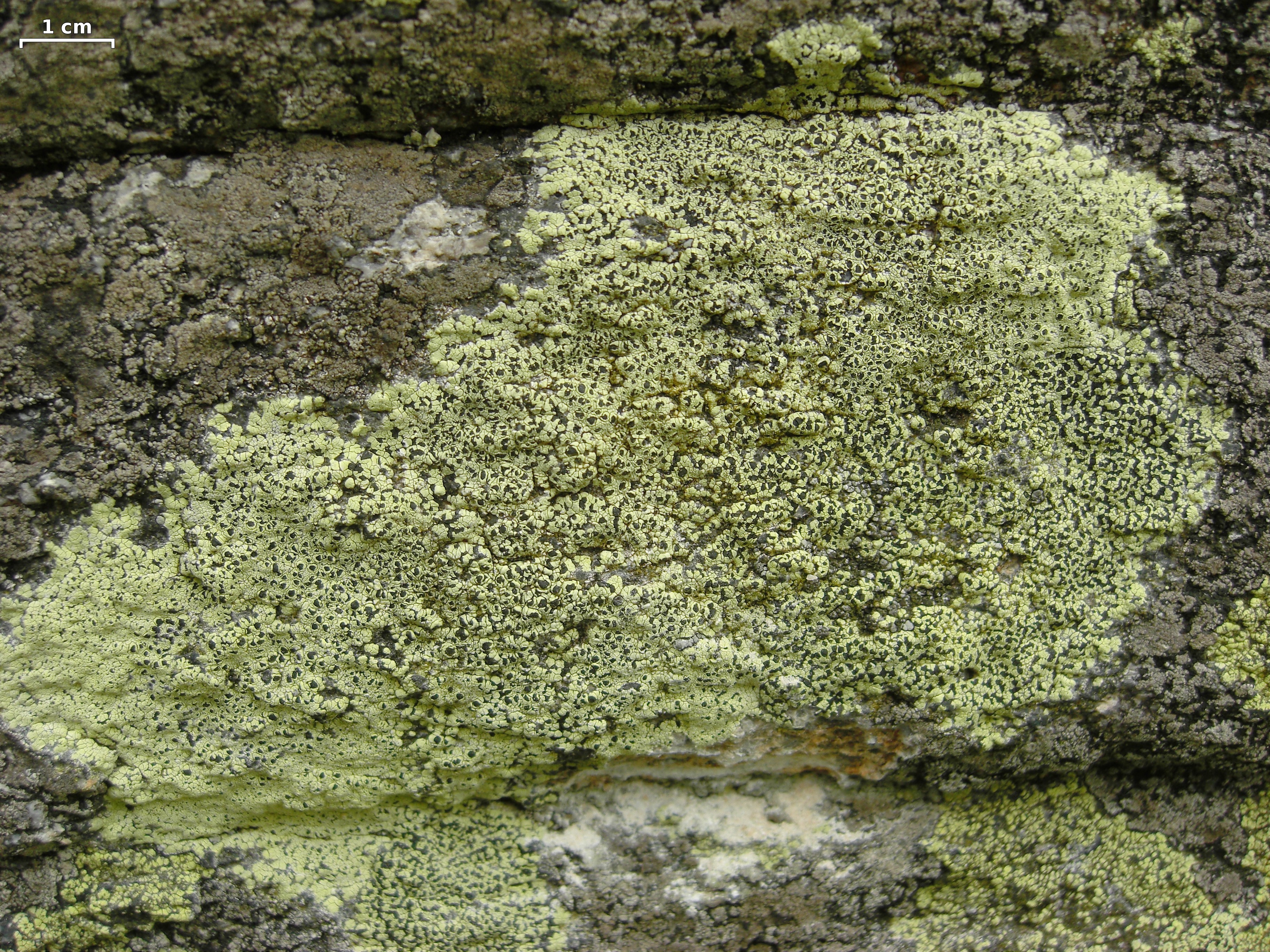

Conservation status
- Apparently Secure (NatureServe)

Scientific classification
- Kingdom: Fungi
- Division: Ascomycota
- Class: Lecanoromycetes
- Order: Rhizocarpales
- Family: Rhizocarpaceae
- Genus: Rhizocarpon
- Species: R. lecanorinum

Binomial name
- Rhizocarpon lecanorinum Anders (1923)

Synonyms
- Rhizocarpon geographicum var. lecanorinum Körb. (1855); Buellia geographica var. lecanorina (Körb.) Tuck. (1888); Buellia geographica b lecanorina (Körb.) Tuck. (1888); Lecidea geographica var. lecanorina (Körb.) Nyl. (1896); Diplotomma geographicum f. lecanorinum (Körb.) Jatta (1900)

= Rhizocarpon lecanorinum =

Species of lichen

Rhizocarpon lecanorinum is a species of saxicolous (rock-dwelling), crustose lichen in the family Rhizocarpaceae. It was described as a new species in 1923 by the Czech lichenologist Josef Anders. This species differs from the closely related map lichen R. geographicum in its tendency to form continuous carpets where individual lichen bodies merge together, and its preference for early reproduction even when small in size.

== Description ==
Rhizocarpon lecanorinum forms a bright yellow–green crust that reaches about 4 cm across, though neighbouring thalli commonly merge to make extensive, continuous patches. The surface is divided into small, tile-like areoles (1–2 mm in diameter), which are matt, smooth, and sit on a distinct black prothallus (a narrow border of fungal tissue). Areoles begin rounded and slightly convex; as black fruiting discs (apothecia) develop beside them, the areoles curve around the discs so the apothecia appear rimmed by yellow thallus—a pseudo-lecanorine margin. The internal white layer (medulla) gives an iodine-positive blue reaction (I+ blue).

Apothecia are small (to about 1 mm across), black and not frosted (non-pruinose), broadly circular and flat to shallowly concave. The proper margin (exciple) persists but is often thin and indistinct; its inner part is colourless while the outer rim is brown-black and unreactive to potassium hydroxide solution (K–). The upper hymenial surface (epithecium) is pale olive-brown and may turn greener with K, the spore-bearing layer (hymenium) is colourless to faintly green, and the layer beneath (hypothecium) is thin, brown-black, and K–; no crystals are present in the apothecia. Ascospores are dark brown and muriform (partitioned into many chambers like brickwork), measuring 34–57 × 15–24 μm with about 15–38 cells visible in optical section. Spot tests on the medulla are K+ (yellow) and Pd+ (orange), indicating stictic acid (often in low concentration) together with rhizocarpic acid.

== Thallus development ==
In Rhizocarpon lecanorinum, new thalli do not begin with a spreading, free-living fungal weft. After an ascospore lands, its germ hyphae stay extremely short (typically ≤15 μm, with ≤3 cross-walls) and only form a compact granule once they touch a compatible green alga (Trebouxia). That granule, often just 6–10 algal cells wrapped in a single layer of dark, melanised hyphae, initially has no layered structure. Thallus differentiation starts when the fungus deposits rhizocarpic acid in an incipient cortical layer at the granule's apex; as pigmentation develops, the dark envelope is shed and the granule turns yellow-green to become the first areole (a small, tile-like patch) of the thallus. At the same time, dark hyphae at the areole base give rise to the radiating prothallus (the narrow, black fringe).

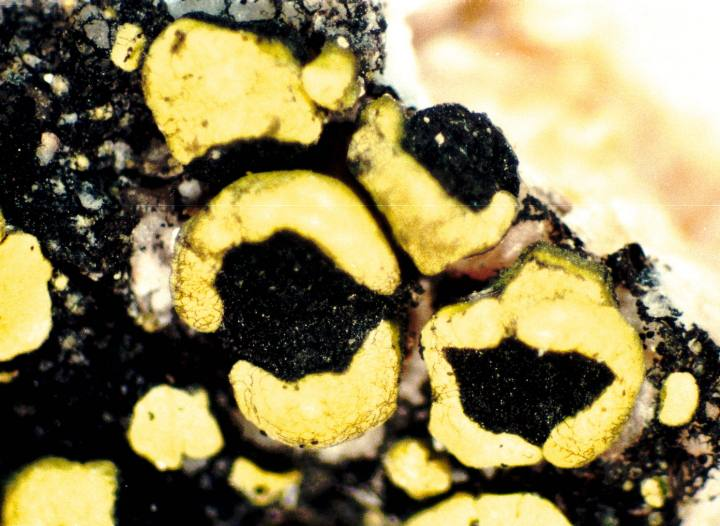
crescent-shaped yellow areoles partially enclose black apothecia; 35X magnification

Once the founding areole is in place, further areoles arise as tiny swellings within the surrounding prothallus and then break through its surface. Most of these lack a floor of melanised hyphae, implying that the advancing prothallus commonly overgrows Trebouxia cells already attached to, or within, the rock; cortex and a compact algal layer develop beneath the dark surface before eruption. The prothallus itself expands in braid-like strands that often secrete mucilage at their tips. Asexual propagules (pycnidia) appear early at areole edges, and sexual apothecia can mature on thalli only about 2 mm across; their development notches the growing areole margin and produces the crescent-to-entire, pseudo-lecanorine rim typical of this species. Overall, the sequence is "telescoped": a brief sporeling stage, quick areole formation, and early, heavy investment in ascospore production—traits that fit rapid colonisation of fresh rock.

== Ecology ==
Field studies comparing Rhizocarpon lecanorinum with the map lichen R. geographicum found that neighbouring thalli of R. lecanorinum commonly merge without leaving visible boundaries, producing continuous carpets of areoles. By contrast, thalli of R. geographicum (especially subsp. prospectans) remain sharply delimited from one another and form a mosaic. The coalescing habit in R. lecanorinum has been interpreted as evidence of somatic compatibility among very closely related—or even clonal—individuals, whereas the mosaic pattern in R. geographicum is consistent with somatic incompatibility between distinct genotypes. In the same comparisons, R. geographicum typically produced many pycnidia, while R. lecanorinum bore scarce pycnidia but developed apothecia even at small thallus sizes and high colony density.

A facultative parasitic relationship has been observed in which Schaereria fuscocinerea invades thalli of R. lecanorinum, spreads outward through the host, and replaces the host's cortex and algal layer with its own tissues; co-occurring R. geographicum resisted such invasion. Occasional parasitism by Protoparmelia badia on R. lecanorinum has also been observed.

== Reproduction ==
Ascospore release in this species is seasonal: field monitoring over a full year showed a clear late-winter to spring maximum in discharge of the sexually produced spores (ascospores). Apothecia tend to mature over the winter months, which matches the timing of that spring peak. The pattern was not explained by any single weather factor; rather, alternating wet and dry conditions appeared to favour release. Spores were captured singly and in clumps, and occasionally entire spore sacs (asci) were caught; splash may also contribute to what is trapped.
