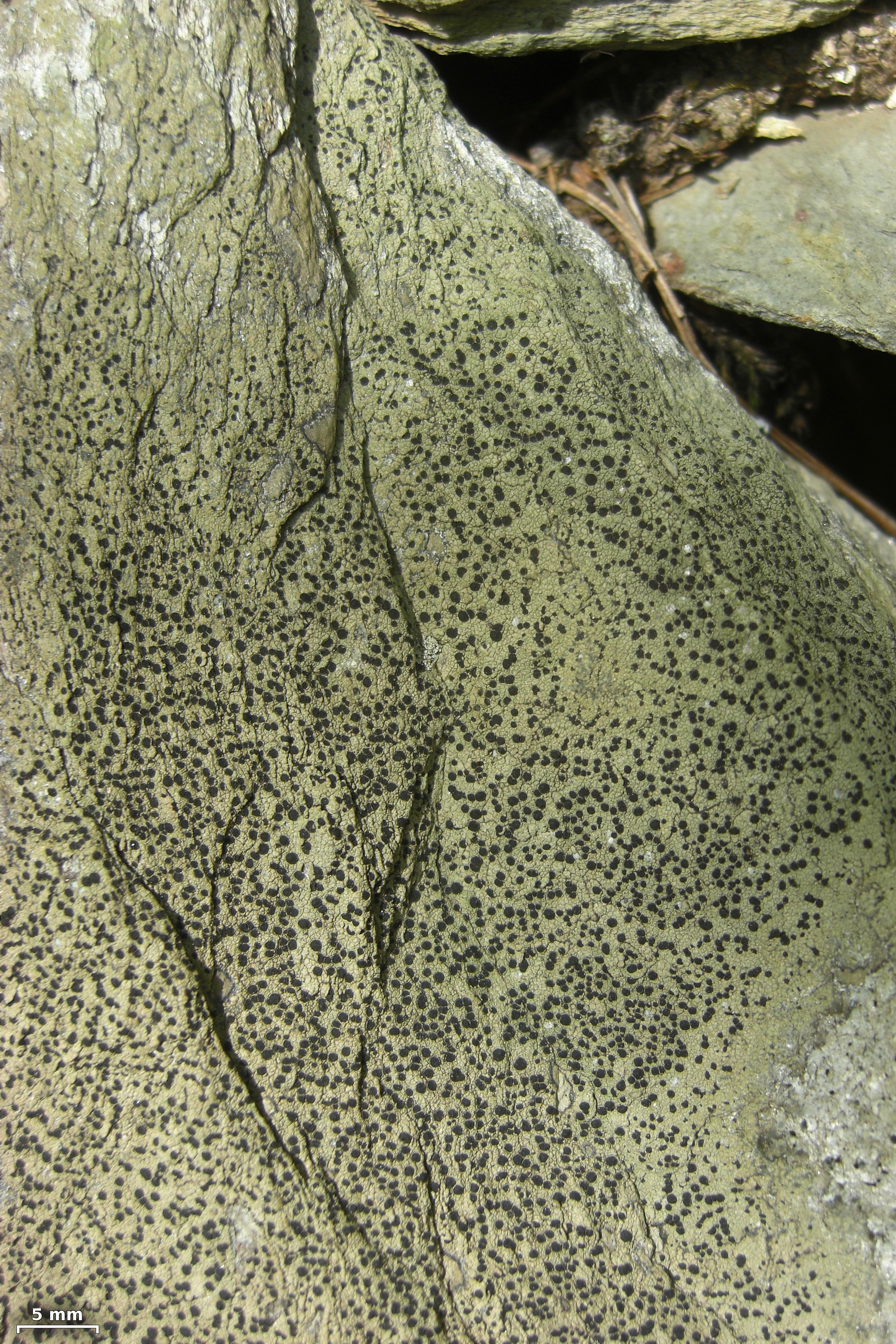

Conservation status
- Apparently Secure (NatureServe)

Scientific classification
- Kingdom: Fungi
- Division: Ascomycota
- Class: Lecanoromycetes
- Order: Rhizocarpales
- Family: Rhizocarpaceae
- Genus: Rhizocarpon
- Species: R. cinereovirens

Binomial name
- Rhizocarpon cinereovirens (Müll.Arg.) Vain. (1922)

Synonyms
- Patellaria cinereovirens Müll.Arg. (1868); Catillaria cinereovirens (Müll.Arg.) Vain. (1922); Catocarpus cinereovirens (Müll.Arg.) Oxner (1968)

= Rhizocarpon cinereovirens =

Species of lichen

Rhizocarpon cinereovirens is a species of saxicolous (rock-dwelling), crustose lichen in the family Rhizocarpaceae. This small lichen forms tiny white or pale grey crusts that seldom exceed a centimetre across, broken into minute plates with small black disc-shaped fruiting bodies. It grows on exposed, nutrient-poor siliceous rocks and metal-rich surfaces in both windswept mountain summits and coastal areas, and is found across the British Isles, Scandinavia, and northeastern United States. It is now confirmed from north-eastern China as well as the North Atlantic region of Europe and North America, giving the species a broad circumpolar–boreal distribution.

== Taxonomy ==
The lichen was described as a new species in 1868 by Johannes Müller Argoviensis, who initially classified it in the genus Patellaria. Müller described the species from specimens collected in the Canton of Bern, Switzerland. In his original description, he noted the species' distinctive greyish-green thallus and characterized it as having a rimose-areolate surface structure. He distinguished Patellaria cinereovirens from related taxa by its specific morphological features, including the nature of its apothecia and spore characteristics. Edvard August Vainio transferred the taxon to Rhizocarpon in 1922. Based on its non-yellow thallus and lack of rhizocarpic acid, the species belongs to Rhizocarpon subgenus Phaeothallus.

== Description ==
Rhizocarpon cinereovirens forms tiny crusts that seldom exceed a centimetre in diameter. The thallus breaks into minute plates (areoles) about 0.3–0.4 mm across; these range from flat, wafer-thin patches to slightly blistered cushions up to 0.8 mm thick and are usually snow-white or pale grey, occasionally light brown. A black, fibrous prothallus—an advancing web of fungal hyphae—may appear only in small fringes at the colony's edge or be entirely absent.

Reproduction occurs in black apothecia that sit flush with or slightly above the thallus. Each disc is 0.4–0.6 mm across, initially flat but becoming gently domed. Like many members of the genus, the apothecia are lecideine in form: the pale outer rim derived from the thallus is missing, so the only margin is the fungal wall (true exciple). That wall is scarcely raised—about 0.04 mm thick—and internally shows radiating hyphae that are pale brown beneath a darker skin. The transparent hymenium above reaches 70–90 μm in height. Both the epihymenium and the exciple contain fine crystals that dissolve in K, a practical character separating the species from lookalikes such as R. discoense. Overlying it is an olive-green to blue-black epithecium that turns green-blue with potassium hydroxide (K+ reaction) and reddish-brown with nitric acid (N+). The supporting hypothecium is medium to dark brown. Thread-like paraphysoids just 2.5 μm wide weave through the hymenium; they branch freely, seldom swell at the tips, and carry a sharply defined green-blue cap that remains intact when K is applied.

Each club-shaped ascus (40–70 × 25–30 μm) produces eight colourless ascospores. Mature spores measure 11–18 × 5.5–8.5 μm and are divided once across the middle (1-septate). No asexual reproductive structures have been observed. Spot tests of the medulla are negative with bleach (C−) but give a crimson flash with K (K+ red) and a yellow reaction with para-phenylenediamine (Pd+), indicating the presence of norstictic acid; very rarely, a weaker orange K reaction and the same Pd+ (yellow) reveal stictic acid instead. Thin-layer chromatography detects norstictic acid together with minor stictic acid, corroborating the K+ (yellow→red) and Pd+ (yellow) spot-test reactions.

== Habitat and distribution ==
Rhizocarpon cinereovirens is a sporadic species of exposed, nutrient-poor sites. It colonises hard siliceous rock and metal-rich spoil, thriving where surfaces are scoured by wind or salt spray. Populations occur both on windswept montane summits and in low-level coastal heath. In Asia it has been collected on siliceous rock at roughly 600 m in Jilin Province, north-eastern China—the first confirmed record from the continent. With records now spanning eastern Asia, north-west Europe, and north-east North America, R. cinereovirens shows a disjunct but broadly boreal–subalpine range.

Across the British Isles R. cinereovirens is scattered but widespread, with records from upland and coastal districts in both Wales and Scotland as well as the Isle of Man. Specimens showing the same pale, bullate thallus and immarginate apothecia have also been reported in Scandinavia and the north-eastern United States (Maine), suggesting a broadly North Atlantic range. It can be mistaken for R. discoense, which differs chemically, or for R. infernulum, which lacks norstictic acid and has less intricately branched apothecial filaments.
