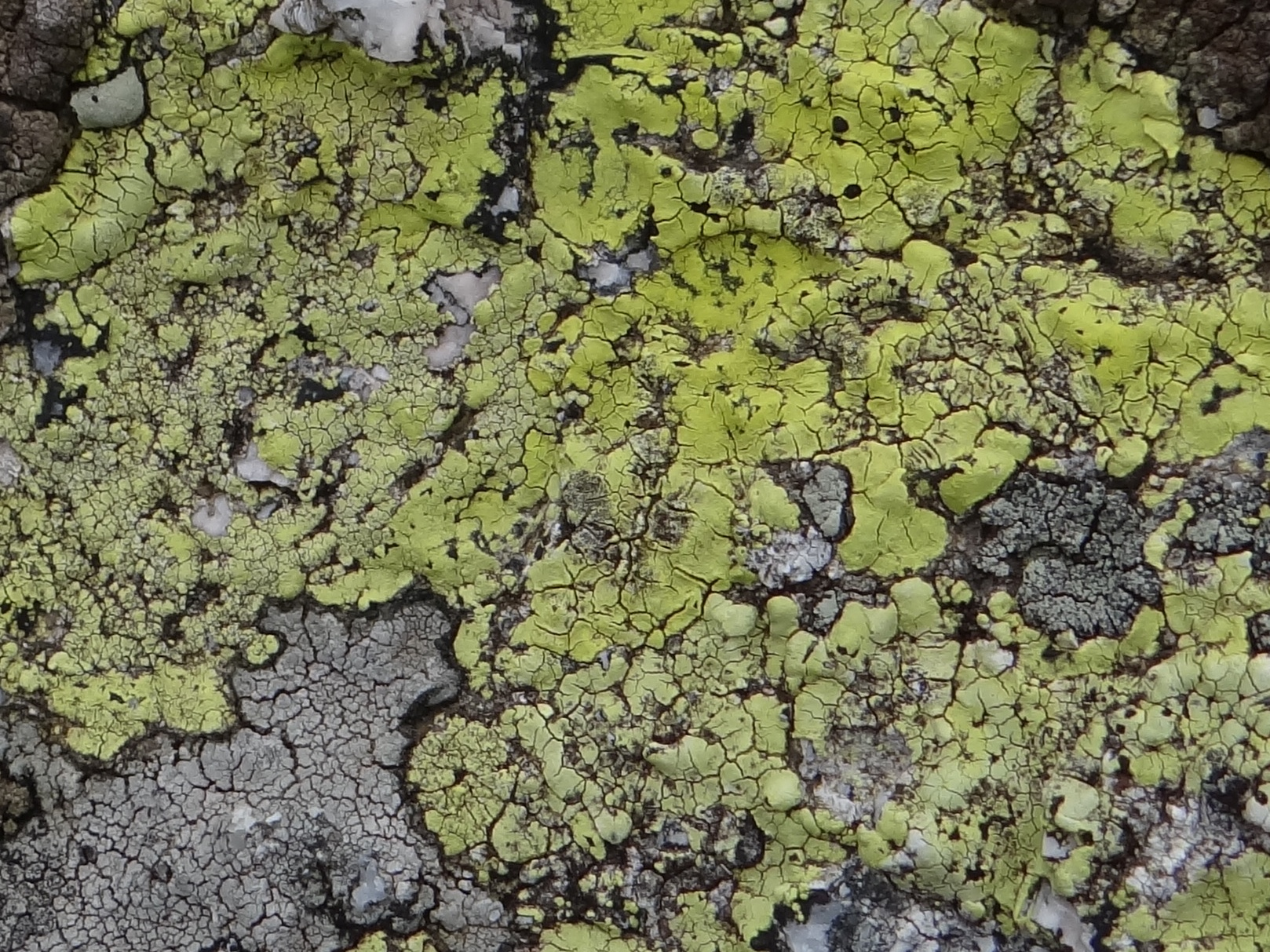

Scientific classification
- Kingdom: Fungi
- Division: Ascomycota
- Class: Lecanoromycetes
- Order: Rhizocarpales
- Family: Rhizocarpaceae
- Genus: Rhizocarpon
- Species: R. alpicola

Binomial name
- Rhizocarpon alpicola (Fr.) Rabenh. (1861)

Synonyms
- List: Lecidea geographica f. alpicola Fr. (1831); Buellia geographica subsp. alpicola (Fr.) Tuck. (1888); Lecidea atrovirens var. gerontica Ach. (1803); Lecidea geographica var. gerontica (Ach.) Nyl. (1861); Rhizocarpon geographicum f. geronticum (Ach.) Th.Fr. (1874); Lecidea geographica f. gerontica (Ach.) Leight. (1879); Buellia geographica var. gerontica (Ach.) H.Olivier (1901); Rhizocarpon geographicum var. geronticum (Ach.) Räsänen (1942); Rhizocarpon geronticum (Ach.) H.Magn. (1948); Lecidea atrovirens var. alpicola Wahlenb. (1812); Lecidea geographica var. alpicola (Wahlenb.) Schaer. (1828); Rhizocarpon geographicum var. alpicola (Wahlenb.) A.Massal. (1852); Lecidea alpicola (Wahlenb.) Hepp (1853); Buellia alpicola (Wahlenb.) Anzi (1860); Catocarpus alpicola (Wahlenb.) Arnold (1871); Lecidea geographica f. conglomerata Fr. (1831); Rhizocarpon geographicum f. conglomeratum (Fr.) A.Massal. (1852); Rhizocarpon geographicum ** conglomeratum (Fr.) Körb. (1855); Buellia alpicola * conglomerata (Fr.) Kremp. (1861); Rhizocarpon conglomeratum (Fr.) Räsänen (1942); Lecidea geographica var. conglomerata Hornem. (1837); Rhizocarpon geographicum var. conglomeratum A.Massal. (1852); Lecidea deludens Nyl. (1873); Buellia deludens (Nyl.) A.L.Sm. (1911); Rhizocarpon deludens (Nyl.) Zahlbr. (1926); Rhizocarpon chionophilum Th.Fr. (1874); Catocarpus chionophilus (Th.Fr.) Stein (1879); Lecidea chionophila (Th.Fr.) Vain. (1883); Lecidea oreites Vain. (1883); Rhizocarpon oreites (Vain.) Zahlbr. (1905); Catocarpus oreites (Vain.) Eitner (1911); Diplotomma geographicum f. conglomeratum Jatta (1900)

= Rhizocarpon alpicola =

Species of lichen

Rhizocarpon alpicola is a species of saxicolous (rock-dwelling), crustose lichen in the family Rhizocarpaceae. The lichen grows as a patch-like crust up to 15 cm across, composed of small yellowish-green tiles that develop black, button-like reproductive structures. A member of the Rhizocarpon geographicum species complex, R. alpicola can usually be distinguished from related species by its large and smooth areoles.

R. alpicola is often utilised in lichenometry, a dating technique used to estimate the length of exposure of rock surfaces. Research on Norwegian glacier forelands has shown that R. alpicola typically establishes on rock surfaces after they have been exposed for about a century, with individual colonies growing slowly over many decades.

== Description ==
Rhizocarpon alpicola forms a broad, patch-like crust that can reach roughly 15 cm across. The edge of each colony is outlined by a conspicuous black prothallus—a band of fungal tissue that develops before the main body develops. The thallus itself is divided into tiny "tiles" (areoles) up to about 1.5 mm wide; these range from contiguous to widely scattered and are matt green-yellow because the cortex concentrates rhizocarpic and psoromic acids. Individual areoles are flat to gently domed and often crack finely across their surface. Internally, the medulla shows no iodine reaction (I–).

Reproduction is via black, button-like apothecia up to 1.5 mm in diameter. They sit flush with or slightly above the thallus and may be round or angular. The surrounding wall (true exciple) is hard to discern externally but, when sectioned, reveals a red-brown inner layer that turns purplish-red with a drop of potassium hydroxide solution. The uppermost tissue (epithecium) is pale to mid-brown and may give a faint purple tint with the same K test. Beneath lies a clear hymenium, and lower still a dark red-brown hypothecium. Each club-shaped ascus contains eight ascospores; the mature spores measure 20–33 μm by 9–17 μm, are divided by a single cross-wall (occasionally a couple of extra thin ones), and darken to a deep brown as they age. No specialised asexual propagules have been observed in this species.

A quick chemical spot test helps separate R. alpicola from look-alikes such as R. atroalbescens: the medulla of R. alpicola remains unresponsive to potassium hydroxide (K−) but flashes bright yellow with para-phenylenediamine (Pd+), whereas R. atroalbescens gives different colour changes because it produces alternate acids.

== Ecology and population dynamics ==
A detailed size-frequency study on dated moraines in the Storbreen glacier foreland (Jotunheimen, south-west Norway) found that R. alpicola first establishes abundantly on rock surfaces that have been exposed for roughly a century and then shows little further recruitment. On the two oldest ridges examined (formed roughly 1750 and 1810), thalli were plentiful, whereas they were scarce on the 1852 moraine and essentially absent on later nineteenth- and twentieth-century ridges.

Mean thallus diameters reflected this pattern of early colonisation followed by cohort ageing: averages rose from about 18 mm on the 1852 ridge to about 25 mm on the 1810 ridge and about 35–38 mm on the 1750 ridge, with occasional individuals approaching 80 mm. The frequency distributions became progressively more positively skewed and peaked, and their standard deviations widened, indicating that most thalli enlarge slowly over decades while few new individuals join the population.

The author of the study proposed two, not mutually exclusive, explanations for the marked absence of small thalli on younger moraines: (1) a colonisation lag of roughly 100 years until suitable micro-substrate develops, or (2) a recent environmental shift (possibly climatic or chemical) that now limits establishment. Whatever the cause, the present‐day population structure at Storbreen is dominated by ageing, slowly expanding thalli with minimal contemporary recruitment. Short-term direct measurements (three years) proved too brief to yield a reliable annual growth rate, but they confirmed that growth slows appreciably as thalli enlarge, complicating any attempt to convert size directly to age.

== Species interactions ==
Carbonea intrudens is a lichenicolous fungus that has been recorded infesting specimens of this lichen collected in Austria.
