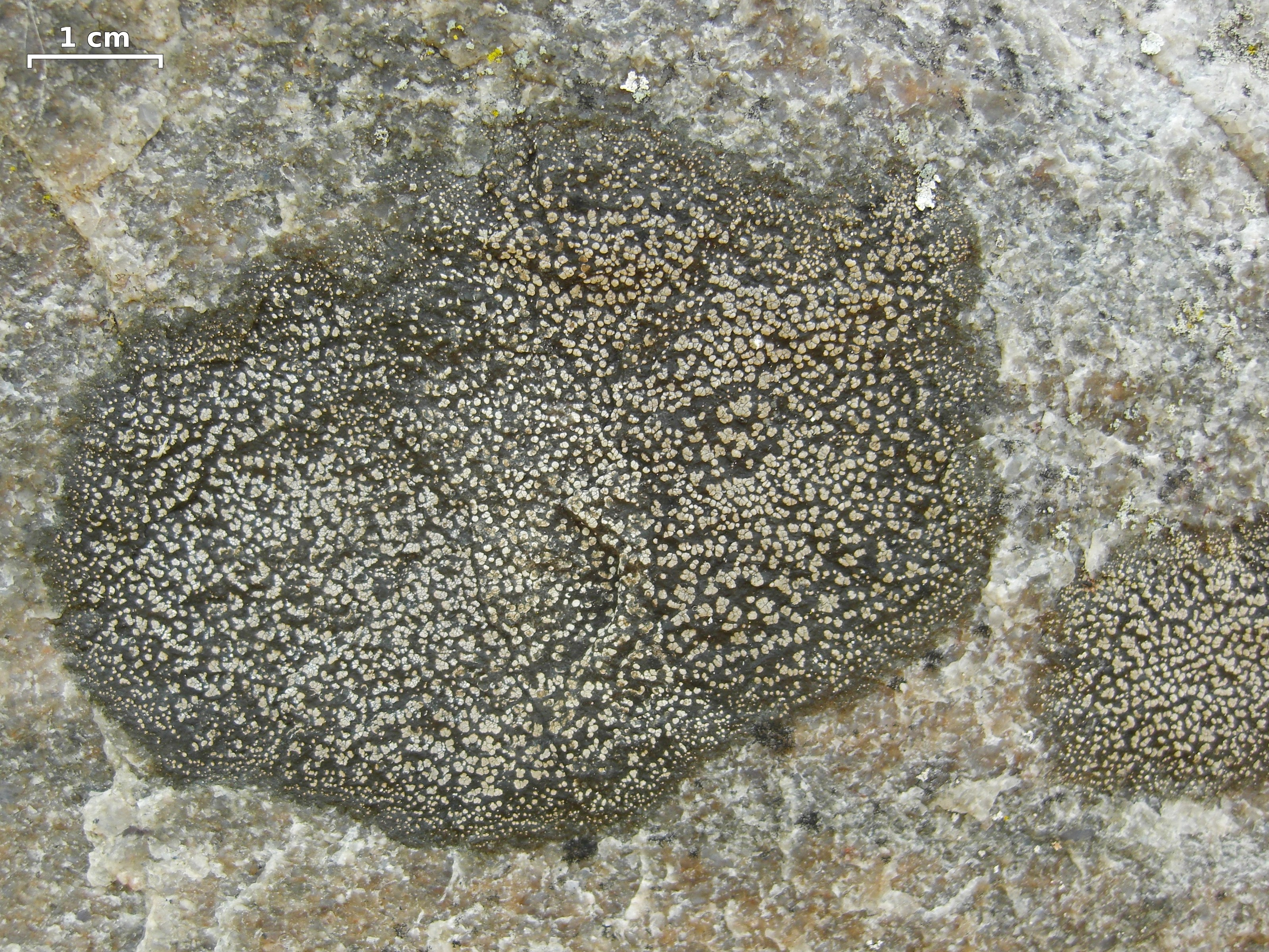

Conservation status
- Secure (NatureServe)

Scientific classification
- Kingdom: Fungi
- Division: Ascomycota
- Class: Lecanoromycetes
- Order: Rhizocarpales
- Family: Rhizocarpaceae
- Genus: Rhizocarpon
- Species: R. grande

Binomial name
- Rhizocarpon grande (Flörke ex Flot.) Arnold (1871)

Synonyms
- List: Lecidea petraea f. grandis Flörke ex Flot. (1828); Rhizocarpon petraeum * grande (Flörke ex Flot.) Körb. (1855); Rhizocarpon atroalbum * grande (Flörke ex Flot.) Körb. (1855); Rhizocarpon petraeum f. grande (Flörke ex Flot.) Anzi (1860); Rhizocarpon atroalbum var. grande (Flörke ex Flot.) Kremp. (1861); Lecidea parapetraea Nyl. (1881); Buellia petraea f. grandis (Flörke ex Flot.) Tuck. (1888); Buellia petraea var. grandis (Flörke ex Flot.) Tuck. (1888); Lecidea grandis (Flörke ex Flot.) Vain. (1899); Diplotomma grande (Flörke ex Flot.) Jatta (1900); Rhizocarpon petraeum subsp. grande (Flörke ex Flot.) Fink (1910); Rhizocarpon petraeum var. grande (Flörke ex Flot.) Zahlbr. (1926); Rhizocarpon parapetraeum (Nyl.) Zahlbr. (1899); Lecidea grandis f. parapetraea (Nyl.) Vain. (1903)

= Rhizocarpon grande =

Species of lichen

Rhizocarpon grande is a species of saxicolous (rock-dwelling), crustose lichen in the family Rhizocarpaceae. It occurs in Europe, North America, and South Korea.

== Description ==
Rhizocarpon grande has a crust-like (crustose) thallus that adheres to rocks (saxicolous). Typically, it can grow up to 4 cm (1 9/16 in) in diameter. The surface of the thallus is thick, grey, and features a rough, cracked pattern (verrucose-areolate), varying from being closely packed (contiguous) to more scattered (dispersed). The underlying layer beneath the crust (medulla) is white, while the border of the thallus (prothallus) is distinct and black.

The reproductive structures (apothecia) of Rhizocarpon grande are black, ranging from 0.4 to 0.6 mm in diameter, and can be round to angular in shape. These are typically flat but can also be slightly domed (weakly convex) and are often embedded in the thallus, surrounded by the cracked pattern. The outer rim of the apothecia (true exciple) is subtly present and appears reddish-brown. The layer above the spore-bearing tissue (epihymenium) is an olive-brown colour, while the spore-producing tissue itself (hymenium) is clear (hyaline). The spores are dark brown, have a complex multi-cellular structure (muriform), and measure between 26 and 35 μm long and 11 to 15 μm wide.

Chemically, Rhizocarpon grande reacts in various ways when subjected to specific spot tests: the medulla turns K+ (yellow) or does not change (K−), C+ (red), and orange Pd+ (orange) or no change (P−). The exciple and epihymenium are K+ (purple-red). The lichen contains several secondary metabolites (lichen products), including gyrophoric acid, barbatic acid, norstictic acid, and stictic acid.

== Habitat and distribution ==
Rhizocarpon grande is found in Europe, North America, and South Korea.
