= Rhizocarpon timdalii =

Scientific classification
- Domain: Eukaryota
- Kingdom: Fungi
- Division: Ascomycota
- Class: Lecanoromycetes
- Order: Rhizocarpales
- Family: Rhizocarpaceae
- Genus: Rhizocarpon
- Species: R. timdalii

Binomial name
- Rhizocarpon timdalii Ihlen & Fryday (2002)

Species of lichen

Rhizocarpon timdalii is a species of saxicolous (rock-dwelling), crustose lichen in the family Rhizocarpaceae. Identified and described as a new species in 2002, this lichen is characterized by its brown thallus composed of convex areoles. It occurs in Europe and North America.

== Taxonomy ==
The species was formally described by the lichenologists Per Gerhard Ihlen and Alan Fryday in 2002. The type specimen of Rhizocarpon timdalii was collected near Sawbill Lake in Cook County, Minnesota, USA. This collection was made in a mixed conifer-hardwood forest near a lake, suggesting a preference for acidic rock habitats. The species epithet honours Einar Timdal of the University of Oslo for his contributions to the taxonomy of the genus Rhizocarpon.

== Description ==
The thallus of Rhizocarpon timdalii is brown and areolate, with each areole being convex. The apothecia are rounded and black, initially flat but become distinctly convex as they mature. The exciple is coloured dark blue-green and reacts negatively to standard lichen spot tests. The hypothecium is brown, and the hymenium is hyaline in the lower part, turning dark orange-brown to brown in the upper part. The ascospores are ellipsoid, eumuriform, and hyaline.

Chemically, the thallus of Rhizocarpon timdalii does not react to standard lichen spot tests. It contains an unidentified fatty acid or lacks lichen products detectable by thin-layer chromatography.

== Habitat and distribution ==
Rhizocarpon timdalii is found in both Europe and North America. In Europe, it prefers exposed, wet rocks, often near lakes. In North America, it is found in various forest types, including coniferous and mixed forests, often near lakes or coasts. Associated lichen species vary by region, including Acarospora species, Lecanora polytropa, and Rhizocarpon geographicum in North America, and Ephebe lanata, Lepraria neglecta, and Umbilicaria deusta in Nordic countries. The species has been recorded at elevations up to 200 m (660 ft) in Fennoscandia and up to 650 m (2,130 ft) in Wales, with a range extending to 520 m (1,710 ft) in the USA.
