= Rhizocarpon ozsoyae =

Scientific classification
- Domain: Eukaryota
- Kingdom: Fungi
- Division: Ascomycota
- Class: Lecanoromycetes
- Order: Rhizocarpales
- Family: Rhizocarpaceae
- Genus: Rhizocarpon
- Species: R. ozsoyae

Binomial name
- Rhizocarpon ozsoyae Halıcı, E.Möller, Timdal, Kahraman Yiğit & Bölükbaşı (2022)

Species of lichen

Rhizocarpon ozsoyae is a species of saxicolous (rock-dwelling), crustose lichen in the family Rhizocarpaceae. Found on Antarctica's James Ross Island, it was formally described as a new species in 2022. Rhizocarpon ozsoyae is distinguished from other species within the Rhizocarpon geographicum group primarily by its predominantly smaller, single-septum ascospores. Additionally, it is unique among nearly all species in the group due to its production of norstictic acid.
