= Rhizocarpon vigilans =

Scientific classification
- Kingdom: Fungi
- Division: Ascomycota
- Class: Lecanoromycetes
- Order: Rhizocarpales
- Family: Rhizocarpaceae
- Genus: Rhizocarpon
- Species: R. vigilans

Binomial name
- Rhizocarpon vigilans P.M.McCarthy & Elix (2014)
- Holotype: Namadgi National Park, Australian Capital Territory

Species of lichen

Rhizocarpon vigilans is a species of crustose lichen in the family Rhizocarpaceae. It is native to the southern Australian Capital Territory, particularly found in the Namadgi National Park on the summit of Sentry Box Mountain.

== Taxonomy ==
Rhizocarpon vigilans was described as a new species by the lichenologists Patrick M. McCarthy and John Elix in 2014, expanding the known diversity within the Rhizocarpaceae. This species was distinguished from others in Rhizocarpon through a combination of morphological and chemical traits.

The type specimen of Rhizocarpon vigilans was collected by McCarthy on 12 December 2013. The collection took place at the summit of Sentry Box Mountain in the Namadgi National Park, Australian Capital Territory, at an elevation of 1,720 m (5,640 ft), where it was found growing on sheltered granite surfaces. The holotype is preserved at the CANB (Australian National Herbarium in Canberra).

The specific epithet vigilans is derived from Latin, meaning "watchful" or "vigilant". This name was chosen in reference to the type locality, Sentry Box Mountain, evoking the imagery of a lookout or guard post. The name reflects the exposed, high-elevation habitat where this lichen species was first identified.

== Description ==
Rhizocarpon vigilans has a crustose, epilithic (growing on the rock surface) thallus that is pale to medium grey, sometimes greenish-grey, and forms colonies up to 2 cm wide. The thallus is areolate with individual areoles measuring 0.15 to 0.85 mm wide, which can be plane or slightly convex. The cortex is poorly defined, and the medulla is white and reacts positively to iodine staining, turning a deep blue, a key indicator of its chemical makeup. The apothecia (fruiting bodies) of this species are numerous and dull black, initially plane but typically becoming convex as they mature, measuring between 0.30 and 0.77 mm in diameter.

=== Similar species ===
Rhizocarpon vigilans is similar to Rhizocarpon polycarpum, but is distinguished by its convex, immarginate apothecia and the mature ascospores that are dark greyish green to dark brown. The epihymenium in R. vigilans is K– (not reacting to potassium hydroxide solution), contrasting with the K+ (purple) reaction found in R. polycarpum.

== Habitat and distribution ==
Rhizocarpon vigilans grows on granite boulders and outcrops on mountain tops, within a lichen community that includes several other species. This habitat is characteristic of exposed alpine locations.
