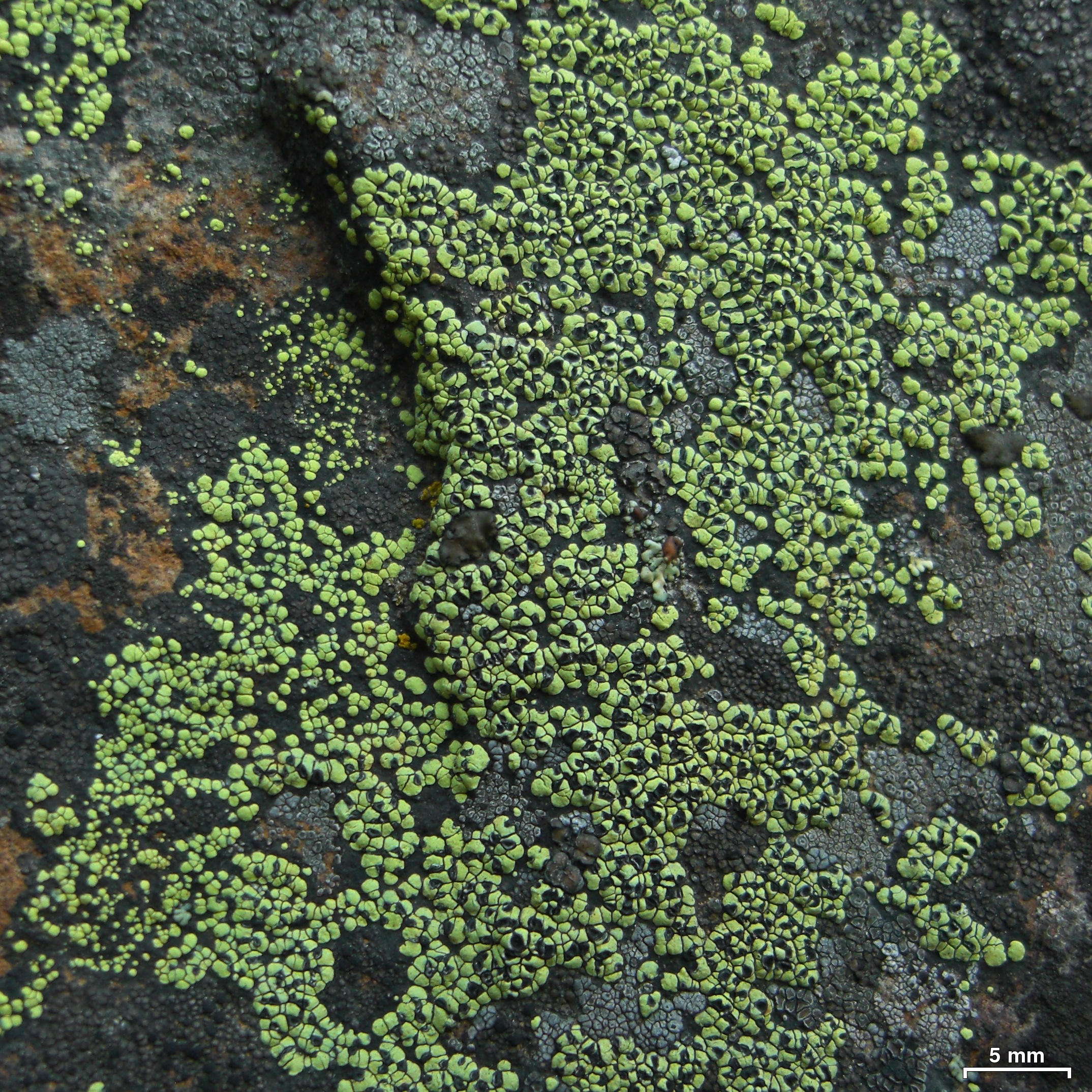

Conservation status
- Vulnerable (NatureServe)

Scientific classification
- Kingdom: Fungi
- Division: Ascomycota
- Class: Lecanoromycetes
- Order: Rhizocarpales
- Family: Rhizocarpaceae
- Genus: Rhizocarpon
- Species: R. macrosporum

Binomial name
- Rhizocarpon macrosporum Räsänen (1943)

= Rhizocarpon macrosporum =

Species of lichen

Rhizocarpon macrosporum (lemon map lichen) is a smooth, bright yellow crustose aereolate lichen found in the Sonoran Desert of California and Arizona, and in Africa and Asia. It grows on non-calciferous rock in clearings in coniferous forests, from 1,475 to 3,030 metres (4,839 to 9,941 ft).

It is very similar to R. geographicum except for the size of the spores. "Macrosporum" means "large spore". Areoles are 1.4 to 2 millimetres (0.055 to 0.079 in) in diameter and round to angular.

The prothallus is black and often not distinct. The medulla is white.
