= Rhizocarpon quinonum =

Scientific classification
- Kingdom: Fungi
- Division: Ascomycota
- Class: Lecanoromycetes
- Order: Rhizocarpales
- Family: Rhizocarpaceae
- Genus: Rhizocarpon
- Species: R. quinonum

Binomial name
- Rhizocarpon quinonum McCune, Timdal & Bendiksby (2016)

Species of lichen

Rhizocarpon quinonum is a species of saxicolous (rock-dwelling), crustose lichen in the family Rhizocarpaceae. It was discovered and described in 2016 from specimens collected in Katmai National Park and Preserve, Alaska. This small lichen forms brown to blackish-brown patches on non-calcareous rocks and scree in alpine environments at elevations between 565 and 1,140 m (1,854 and 3,740 ft) along Alaska's Aleutian Range. The species is distinguished from similar lichens by its chemical profile, particularly its content of anthraquinone compounds (referenced in its scientific name), which helps differentiate it from morphologically similar species like R. bolanderi that often share the same habitats. R. quinonum has since been found in additional locations including Kenai Fjords National Park, where it grows as part of diverse communities of saxicolous lichens in the cold suboceanic climate of southern Alaska.

== Taxonomy ==
Rhizocarpon quinonum was first described from a specimen collected in Katmai National Park and Preserve, Alaska, USA, at an elevation of 565 m (1,854 ft) in alpine tundra conditions characterized by coarse scree and boulders. This lichen is distinguished by its anthraquinone content, a major secondary metabolite which is also referenced in its species epithet quinonum.

Morphologically, R. quinonum closely resembles certain members of Rhizocarpon such as R. arctogenum, R. bolanderi, R. leptolepis, and R. rittokense, which were detailed by Gelting in 1954. These species generally feature brown, grey-edged, somewhat shield-shaped areolae, but they can be differentiated from R. quinonum by their unique ascospore characteristics and chemical compositions. R. arctogenum and R. bolanderi both feature muriform spores and contain the stictic acid complex. R. leptolepis is known for its confriesiic acid content, while R. rittokense varies between having barbatic acid or the stictic acid complex.

While R. arctogenum is primarily documented from Greenland and lacks genetic comparison with R. quinonum, R. bolanderi is more common in western North America and is often confused with R. quinonum due to morphological similarities and overlapping habitats. However, genetic studies using internal transcribed spacer DNA phylogeny indicate that these two are not closely related.

Rhizocarpon rittokense presents two chemical types: one predominantly found in Scandinavia and another that might be related to R. quinonum, though this is considered unlikely as there is no evidence of yellow pigments that are typical for R. quinonum in tested specimens.

== Description ==
The thallus of Rhizocarpon quinonum is crustose and areolate, measuring up to 5 cm (2.0 in) in diameter or larger. The areoles—the small, distinct patches that make up the thallus—are scattered to closely packed, typically ranging from 0.3 to 1.0 mm in width and about 0.2 mm thick. They are usually brown, dark brown, or blackish brown, becoming paler when shaded. The areole surfaces can appear either matte or glossy, with edges that vary from pale to dark grey and sometimes black. Beneath the areoles, the hypothallus is black or grey-black when shaded, and it is visible between the areoles. This lower layer appears dark brown under a microscope. In terms of its optical properties, it does not polarize light in its lower part, but shows polarization in a gradual transition to the medulla (the central tissue layer beneath the cortex).

The upper surface of the thallus may have a thin to thick epinecral layer, typically 5–25 μm thick, which is amorphous and does not strongly polarize light. The true cortex above the algal layer is brown, possibly separated into distinct upper brown and lower clear layers, and is about 15–25 μm thick. This cortex structure is similarly found at the edge of the areole but is darker and resembles the hypothallus in colour and texture. The algal layer is even and measures between 74 and 100 μm in thickness, featuring scattered photobiont cells and grey-brown crystals that respond to potassium hydroxide solution (K) with a yellow diffusion. These photobiont cells are typically chlorococcoid (spherical green algae), measuring 5–11 μm in diameter. The medulla below is up to 75 μm thick, white when viewed with a dissecting microscope, and contains grey to brownish-grey crystals that dissolve in K, also showing a yellow reaction to this chemical.

The basal layer of the hypothallus is dark brown to black and does not polarize light. It reacts to K with a magenta to violet colour change. The lichen does not produce soredia, isidia, or lobules—types of vegetative reproductive structures. While young apothecia (reproductive structures) are attached to the hypothallus and black, mature apothecia were not observed. The developing edge of the exciple (the outer layer of tissue surrounding the apothecium) is dark brown, becoming paler inward, and reacts positively to potassium hydroxide with a yellow diffusion and magenta at the base. The epithecium (the uppermost layer of cells in the apothecium) is dark brown, does not react to potassium hydroxide, and polarizes light weakly.

Pycnidia (flask-shaped asexual reproductive structures) are black, hemispherical to subconical, and sit on the hypothallus or between areoles. Their walls are dark brown and may show a weak reddish reaction to potassium hydroxide. Conidia, the reproductive cells produced by pycnidia, are filamentous and slightly curved, measuring 14.1–17.3 μm in length and 0.6–0.8 μm in width.

The secondary chemistry of Rhizocarpon quinonum includes stictic acid as a major component, alongside derivatives such as cryptostictic and constictic acid, and unknown anthraquinones that show distinctive reactions under various chemical tests.

== Habitat and distribution ==
Rhizocarpon quinonum is found in the Aleutian Range on the Alaska Peninsula, growing at altitudes ranging from 565 to 1,140 m (1,854 to 3,740 ft). The species has been documented at several specific locations within Katmai National Park and Preserve, including a low rocky ridge northeast of Mirror Lake, the northern end of a ridge west of Contact Creek, and gentle slopes approaching the Mirror Lake ridge. More recently, the species has been found growing on rock at the Bear Glacier nunatak in Kenai Fjords National Park. At these sites, it grows on non-calcareous rock and talus within alpine environments, where it is part of diverse communities of rock-dwelling (saxicolous) lichens. These habitats are exposed and subject to the cold suboceanic climate typical of the region. Due to the lack of climate stations at the higher elevations where this lichen is found, climate data is typically drawn from nearby lower elevations. At these lower elevation reference stations, the average annual precipitation is around 125 cm (49 in). The seasonal variation in this area's climate is reflected in the temperature averages: in January, they drop to about −9 °C (16 °F), while in July, they reach approximately 13 °C (55 °F).
