= Rhizocarpon austroalpinum =

Scientific classification
- Kingdom: Fungi
- Division: Ascomycota
- Class: Lecanoromycetes
- Order: Rhizocarpales
- Family: Rhizocarpaceae
- Genus: Rhizocarpon
- Species: R. austroalpinum

Binomial name
- Rhizocarpon austroalpinum P.M.McCarthy, Elix & Kantvilas (2014)
- Holotype: Mount Pillinger, Tasmania

Species of lichen

Rhizocarpon austroalpinum is a species of saxicolous (rock-dwelling), crustose lichen in the family Rhizocarpaceae. This species can be recognised by its distinctive whitish to pale grey body (thallus) and its large, often partly sunken or barely raised fruiting structures (apothecia). It occurs in Australia.

== Taxonomy ==
The species was described by the lichenologists Patrick M. McCarthy, John Elix, and Gintaras Kantvilas based on specimens collected by Kantvilas from Mount Pillinger in the Cradle Mountain-Lake St Clair National Park, at an elevation of 1,270 m (4,170 ft). The species epithet austroalpinum alludes to the species' distribution in southern alpine regions.

== Description ==
The thallus of Rhizocarpon austroalpinum is crustose and epilithic (on the rock surface), spreading up to approximately 5 cm in width, and typically off-white to medium greenish-grey. The thallus is 80–400 μm thick and composed of contiguous or scattered areoles that are dull, smooth, and can be flat or moderately to strongly convex. These areoles may be angular to somewhat rounded, with a clearly defined cortex that is 7–15 μm thick.

Apothecia (fruiting bodies) are numerous, dull black, and round to irregular, often due to mutual pressure, measuring 0.43 to 1.38 mm in diameter. The apothecia are characterised by a thin to moderately thick proper exciple, producing a deep red leachate when treated with potassium hydroxide solution, and a thick, dark hypothecium ranging from 160 to 450 μm. The ascospores are hyaline, mostly submuriform (having internal septa arranged somewhat brick-like), and measure 18 to 37 by 9 to 17 μm.

== Habitat and distribution ==
Rhizocarpon austroalpinum is known from cold and sun-exposed alpine regions in Tasmania and the Mount Kosciuszko area in New South Wales, where it typically grows on dolerite boulder.
