= Rhizocarpon exiguum =

Scientific classification
- Kingdom: Fungi
- Division: Ascomycota
- Class: Lecanoromycetes
- Order: Rhizocarpales
- Family: Rhizocarpaceae
- Genus: Rhizocarpon
- Species: R. exiguum

Binomial name
- Rhizocarpon exiguum P.M.McCarthy, Elix & Kantvilas (2020)
- Holotype: Trial Harbour, Tasmania

Species of lichen

Rhizocarpon exiguum is a species of saxicolous (rock-dwelling), crustose lichen in the family Rhizocarpaceae. This Tasmanian species is characterised by its minimalistic appearance with very small apothecia and a thallus that is pale, sparse and areolate.

== Taxonomy ==
It was first described by the lichenologists Patrick M. McCarthy, John Alan Elix, and Gintaras Kantvilas based on specimens collected from coastal serpentinite rock outcrops in Tasmania, Australia. Rhizocarpon exiguum was identified for its distinctive small size, both in thallus and reproductive structures (apothecia). The species epithet exiguum suggests its small and meagre nature. This species is distinct from other Rhizocarpon species with similar colouring due to its uniquely small apothecia and minimal thallus.

== Description ==
The thallus of Rhizocarpon exiguum is crustose, epilithic, and spreads out to about 10–15 mm wide. It is typically off-white to medium grey and ranges from 50 to 90 μm in thickness. The areoles are scattered, rounded, elongate, or irregular in shape, and do not have a rimulose edge. The surface is smooth and dull, lacking any powdery covering (epruinose).

Apothecia are moderately numerous, typically black and either round or broadly ellipsoid, measuring 0.19 to 0.44 mm in diameter. They feature a very thin proper exciple, darkening to a deep purple when treated with a potassium hydroxide solution (K). The ascospores are dark brown, submuriform (divided into multiple internal compartments by intersecting longitudinal and transverse septa), and small, with only a few cells visible in optical section.

== Habitat and distribution ==
This lichen is known to occur only at the type locality on the west coast of Tasmania. It grows in sheltered crevices of coastal serpentinite rocks, which are known for supporting highly localised endemic species.
