= Rhizocarpon austroamphibium =

Scientific classification
- Domain: Eukaryota
- Kingdom: Fungi
- Division: Ascomycota
- Class: Lecanoromycetes
- Order: Rhizocarpales
- Family: Rhizocarpaceae
- Genus: Rhizocarpon
- Species: R. austroamphibium

Binomial name
- Rhizocarpon austroamphibium Fryday & Kantvilas (2012)

Species of lichen

Rhizocarpon austroamphibium is a species of saxicolous (rock-dwelling), crustose lichen in the family Rhizocarpaceae. It is found in alpine environments in southwestern Tasmania, Australia.

== Taxonomy ==
The lichen was formally described by the lichenologists Alan Fryday and Gintaras Kantvilas in 2012. This species is distinguished by its smooth grey thallus, innate apothecia (fruiting bodies) with a white margin, relatively unbranched paraphyses, and large, eumuriform, pigmented ascospores. These characteristics place Rhizocarpon austroamphibium within the genus Rhizocarpon but suggest a peripheral position due to its unique apothecial features compared to other species.

== Description ==
The thallus of Rhizocarpon austroamphibium is glaucous to olivaceous-grey, spreading over quartzite pebbles in and around alpine tarns. It forms contiguous, cracked-rimose patches that are typically about 50 μm thick. The surface cells are pigmented blue-grey. The medulla appears hyaline with minute, pale brown inclusions and is structured in two layers: a randomly organised upper layer and a more structured, columnar lower layer near the algal layer.

Apothecia (fruiting bodies) of Rhizocarpon austroamphibium are 0.4 to 0.6 mm in diameter, initially immersed but becoming emergent, forming a pseudothalline margin that appears white in mature specimens. The disc of the apothecia is black, rough, and becomes prominently convex when wet. The hymenium is around 160 to 170 μm tall, featuring simple paraphyses that are rarely anastomosing, and a thin, pale brown hypothecium.

== Habitat and distribution ==
Rhizocarpon austroamphibium is known only from two locations in Tasmania: the Mount Eliza plateau and near Lake Cygnus in the Western Arthur Range. It grows in shallow alpine tarns and on quartzite rocks that are seasonally or intermittently inundated, which marks a distinctive ecological niche compared to other lichens typically found in more consistently dry or exposed conditions. This species forms pure colonies on submerged or moist quartzite pebbles, sharing its habitat with a variety of other lichens adapted to similar conditions.
