= Rhizocarpon sunchonense =

Scientific classification
- Kingdom: Fungi
- Division: Ascomycota
- Class: Lecanoromycetes
- Order: Rhizocarpales
- Family: Rhizocarpaceae
- Genus: Rhizocarpon
- Species: R. sunchonense

Binomial name
- Rhizocarpon sunchonense S.Y.Kondr. & J.-S.Hur (2016)
- Holotype: Yongsan-dong, South Korea

Species of lichen

Rhizocarpon sunchonense is a species of saxicolous (rock-dwelling), crustose lichen in the family Rhizocarpaceae. Discovered in South Korea, this species is notable for its greenish thallus and distinctive ecological preferences.

== Taxonomy ==
The species was formally described as new to science in 2016 by the lichenologists Sergey Kondratyuk and Jae-Seoun Hur. Rhizocarpon sunchonense resembles Rhizocarpon norvegicum in form but is distinguished by its larger thallus size, smaller and flatter areoles, and the colour and chemical reactions of its apothecial elements. The species also lacks the lobate-like areoles and uplifted hypothallus seen in R. effiguratum. The species epithet refers to Sunchon city, the type locality.

== Description ==
The thallus of Rhizocarpon sunchonense typically spans 4–5 cm across, presenting a dull green to dark greenish hue, intensified by numerous small black apothecia (fruiting bodies) which give it a darker overall appearance. The areoles of the thallus are very small, ranging from 0.1 to 0.4 mm in diameter, and are either slightly distant or densely aggregated, separated by very thin cracks. Unlike some other species, it lacks a hypothallus.

Apothecia (fruiting bodies) are quite small, ranging from 0.15 to 0.4 mm in diameter, and contribute to the darker visual aspect of the thallus. They are mostly flat and regularly rounded, with a distinct, often black margin that can sometimes appear greenish black or citrine-black. The epihymenium and exciple do not react to potassium hydroxide solution (K–), which is a key differentiator from similar species.

== Habitat and distribution ==
At the time of its original publication, Rhizocarpon sunchonense was only known to occur at its type locality in Suncheon-si, Jeollanam-do, South Korea. It grows on siliceous rocks within pine forests or open areas at an elevation of 277 m (909 ft) above sea level. The lichen coexists with other species such as Xanthoparmelia coreana and various species of Aspicilia and Diploschistes.

This species is adapted to growing on siliceous rocks in both shaded forest environments and exposed, open areas. Its ecological distribution suggests it can tolerate a range of sunlight exposures and potentially variable moisture conditions, though it prefers stable rock surfaces.
