= Rhizocarpon torquatum =

Scientific classification
- Kingdom: Fungi
- Division: Ascomycota
- Class: Lecanoromycetes
- Order: Rhizocarpales
- Family: Rhizocarpaceae
- Genus: Rhizocarpon
- Species: R. torquatum

Binomial name
- Rhizocarpon torquatum P.M.McCarthy, Elix & Kantvilas (2020)
- Holotype: Frankland River, Tasmania

Species of lichen

Rhizocarpon torquatum is a species of saxicolous (rock-dwelling), crustose lichen in the family Rhizocarpaceae. This species is recognised by its pale, thick, smooth, areolate thallus that contains hypostictic acid as a major metabolite, and its large apothecia (fruiting bodies) that are distinctively adorned with a whitish inner collar in immature stages.

== Taxonomy ==
It was first described by the lichenologists Patrick M. McCarthy, John Alan Elix, and Gintaras Kantvilas. The specific epithet torquatum—meaning adorned with a collar in Latin—refers to the characteristic appearance of the apothecia's margin, which often retains a whitish inner collar. This feature, along with the chemical profile and apothecial anatomy, helps distinguish Rhizocarpon torquatum from similar species.

== Description ==
The thallus of Rhizocarpon torquatum is crustose and epilithic, forming colonies approximately 1–4 cm (0.4–1.6 in) wide, varying in colour from greyish white to pale grey with a greenish tint. The thallus, up to 300 micrometre (μm) thick, with a rimose to areolate texture with smooth to coarsely rugulose areoles that are contiguous and mostly flat. The thallus lacks a true cortex, instead featuring an uppermost necral layer directly above a discontinuous algal layer.

Apothecia (fruiting bodies) are numerous, ranging from 0.52 to 1.30 mm in diameter, with a margin that can be thick and varies from being the same as the blackish disc to considerably paler. These reproductive structures are initially embedded but become more prominent as they mature. The excipulum is annular, typically darkening to brown-black, and the hypothecium is thick.

== Habitat and distribution ==
Rhizocarpon torquatum is known only from its type locality along the Frankland River in north-western Tasmania. It grows on seasonally inundated, siliceous rocks within the river bed, an environment that also supports a diverse range of other rock-dwelling lichen species adapted to periodic disturbances. These species include: Paraporpidia leptocarpa, Baeomyces heteromorphus, Trapelia coarctata, Stereocaulon ramulosum, Hymenelia lacustris, and the only known locality of Porina australis.
