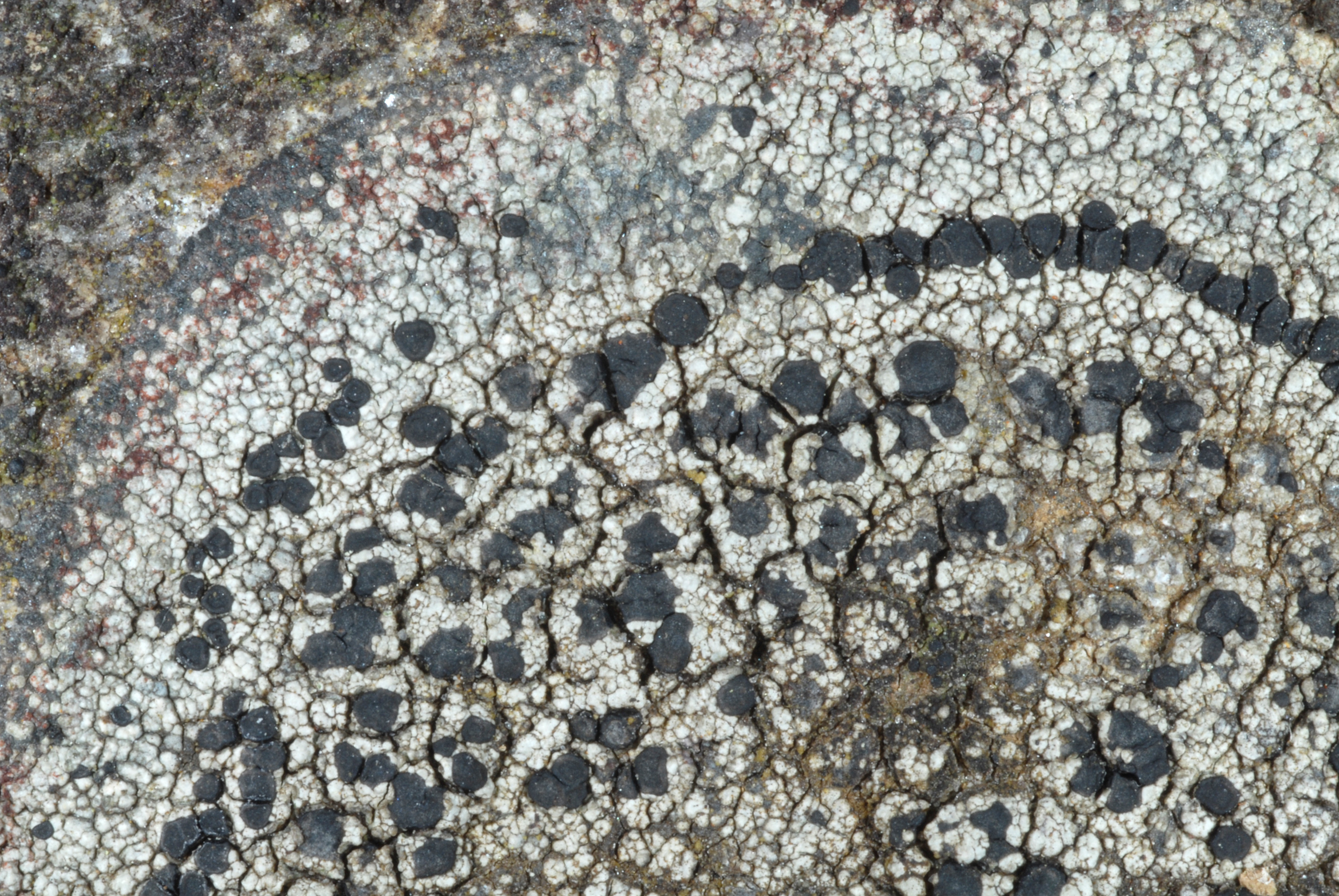

Scientific classification
- Kingdom: Fungi
- Division: Ascomycota
- Class: Lecanoromycetes
- Order: Rhizocarpales
- Family: Rhizocarpaceae
- Genus: Rhizocarpon
- Species: R. reductum

Binomial name
- Rhizocarpon reductum Th.Fr. (1874)

Synonyms
- Rhizocarpon obscuratum var. reductum (Th.Fr.) Eitner (1911); Rhizocarpon obscuratum f. reductum (Th.Fr.) Schade (1935)

= Rhizocarpon reductum =

Species of lichen

Rhizocarpon reductum is a widely distributed species of saxicolous (rock-dwelling), crustose lichen in the family Rhizocarpaceae. This lichen forms thin, pale grey to brown crusts that crack into tiny angular plates, with scattered black disc-shaped fruiting bodies about 0.4–0.6 mm across. It has an extremely wide global distribution, being found on multiple continents including Europe, Asia, Africa, North and South America, Australia, New Zealand, and even Antarctica.

== Taxonomy ==
It was formally described by Theodor Magnus Fries in 1874. In 1911, Eitner instead proposed to classify it as a variety of Rhizocarpon obscuratum.

In 2000, Alan Fryday resurrected the name to accommodate specimens with small ascospores previously referred to Rhizocarpon lavatum (Fr.) Hazslin. Subsequent work on Central-European material resolved long-standing confusion surrounding the name Rhizocarpon obscuratum. A Polish Carpathian survey demonstrated that most historical records of R. obscuratum in fact represent either R. lavatum (lacking lichen products) or R. reductum (containing stictic acid). The same study confirmed that R. obscuratum is a synonym of Fuscidea lygaea, thereby consolidating the resurrection of R. reductum for the stictic acid lineage.

Polish specimens showed a consistent suite of features—ascospores 24–26 × 8–10 μm with 8–10 (occasionally 12) locules, thalli reacting K+ yellow, and PD+ orange—that match Fryday's British concept of the species. These measurements are slightly smaller than those earlier reported from northwestern Europe, suggesting genuine geographic variation rather than misidentification.

== Description ==
Rhizocarpon reductum grows directly on rock surfaces, forming either loose, spreading films or discrete patches one to two centimetres across that often merge into larger fields. Its thallus—a thin, crust-like body—ranges from pale grey to brown and cracks into tiny angular plates (areoles) about 0.2–0.4 mm wide; these plates are usually flat or gently domed, and in rare cases they lift slightly like minute scales. A thin black prothallus, the advance guard of fungal threads, usually rims each colony and can dominate shaded substrates where the main thallus is reduced.

Black apothecia, the lichen's reproductive discs, are scattered among the areoles. At first they are flush with the surface (innate) but may become stalk-less cups (sessile) that rise fractionally above it; each disc is 0.4–0.6 mm in diameter, rough-textured, and turns strongly convex as it over-matures. A narrow fungal wall (true exciple) borders young apothecia; it is built from radiating hyphae whose outer cells are blue-black, but this rim can erode as the disc bulges. The transparent spore-bearing layer (hymenium) is 120–140 μm tall, overlaid by an olive-green epithecium that flashes blue with potassium hydroxide solution (K+ reaction) and brick-red with nitric acid (N+). Below lies a mid- to dark-brown hypothecium. Slender paraphysoids—supporting filaments only about 1 μm thick—thread the hymenium; they branch rarely, do not swell at their tips, and lack a sharply pigmented cap.

Each club-shaped ascus measures 65–80 × 25–33 μm and houses eight colourless ascospores. Mature spores are eumuriform, usually 24–26 × 8–10 μm, and divided into eight to ten (rarely twelve) chambers in optical view. No separate asexual diaspores have been observed. Chemical spot tests show the medulla is usually bleach-negative (C−) but turns yellow with potassium hydroxide (K+) and orange with para-phenylenediamine (Pd+), indicating stictic acid; very occasionally the thallus lacks these reactions and corresponding substances.

== Habitat and distribution ==
Rhizocarpon reductum is widely distributed across the globe, with occurrences in Australia and New Zealand, the British Isles, continental Europe, Arctic Eurasia, Morocco, Tunisia, Turkey, Ukraine, Central Asia, China, South Africa, North America, Venezuela, Bolivia, Chile, Argentina, the Falkland Islands, and Antarctica. In Central Europe the species has been verified from siliceous sandstones of the Gorce Mountains (Western Beskids, Polish Carpathians) at 530–1,220 m elevation, where it colonises exposed, periodically sun-warmed boulders and road-cut faces.
