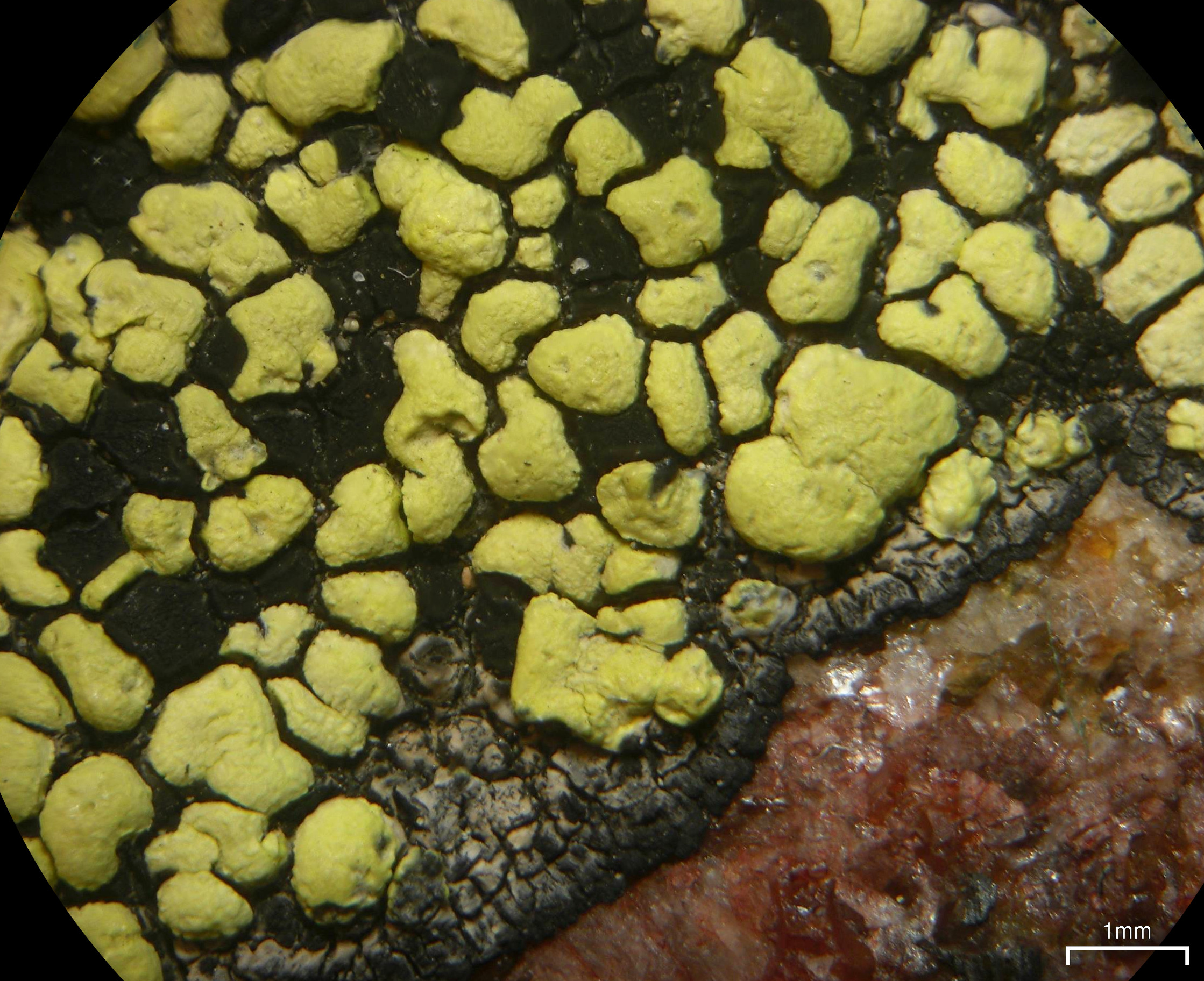

Conservation status
- Secure (NatureServe)

Scientific classification
- Kingdom: Fungi
- Division: Ascomycota
- Class: Lecanoromycetes
- Order: Rhizocarpales
- Family: Rhizocarpaceae
- Genus: Rhizocarpon
- Species: R. superficiale

Binomial name
- Rhizocarpon superficiale (Schaer.) Malme (1914)

Synonyms
- List: Lecidea superficialis Schaer. (1828); Catocarpus superficialis (Schaer.) Hav. (1939); Rhizocarpon splendidum Malme (1926); Rhizocarpon superficiale subsp. splendidum (Malme) Runemark (1956); Rhizocarpon crystalligenum Lynge (1932); Rhizocarpon superficiale var. crystalligenum (Lynge) Clauzade & Cl.Roux (1985); Rhizocarpon superficiale subsp. boreale Runemark (1956)

= Rhizocarpon superficiale =

Species of lichen

Rhizocarpon superficiale is a species of saxicolous (rock-dwelling), crustose lichen in the family Rhizocarpaceae. It occurs in Europe and North America.

== Taxonomy ==
The lichen was first scientifically described by the Swiss lichenologist Ludwig Schaerer in 1828. He initially classified it in the genus Lecidea. Gustaf Oskar Andersson Malme transferred it to the genus Rhizocarpon in 1914.

== Habitat, distribution, and ecology ==
Rhizocarpon superficiale predominantly grows on rock surfaces, particularly in harsh environments like arctic and alpine regions, although it can occasionally be found in more temperate zones. This lichen is particularly adept at colonising exposed and windy ridge crests where snow cover is often minimal during the winter. It is commonly found on the summits above the treeline, which varies from about 1900 to 2000 metres in elevation depending on exposure.

The species is extensively documented on reddish slabs of Precambrian argillite in southwestern Alberta, Canada. These locations are known for their accessibility even in midwinter and for the flatness of the rock, which is ideal for scientific study. Rhizocarpon superficiale forms populations on Table Mountain and Prairie Bluff, thriving in conditions where wind exposure maximises sun and air exposure, reducing snow cover and enhancing its survival and growth.

Ecologically, Rhizocarpon superficiale inhabits a niche that allows it to experience a microclimate significantly warmer than the ambient air due to its proximity to the ground. This boundary-layer environment moderates extreme temperatures that might otherwise be detrimental to the lichen. The lichen's ability to endure and adapt to rapid temperature changes and hydration levels is critical for its survival in these alpine conditions. During chinook wind events, for instance, the lichen experiences swift transitions from heavy snowfall to melting conditions, leading to brief but significant periods of hydration essential for photosynthesis and carbon gain throughout the year.

This lichen's ecological success is further evidenced by its ability to remain hydrated across all seasons, a rarity in alpine environments where low temperatures typically prevail. The periods of hydration, crucial for the lichen's metabolic processes, occur during varied weather patterns, including the unpredictable chinook winds which dramatically alter the microclimate.

Rhizocarpon superficiale is host to the lichenicolous fungus species Muellerella pygmaea.
