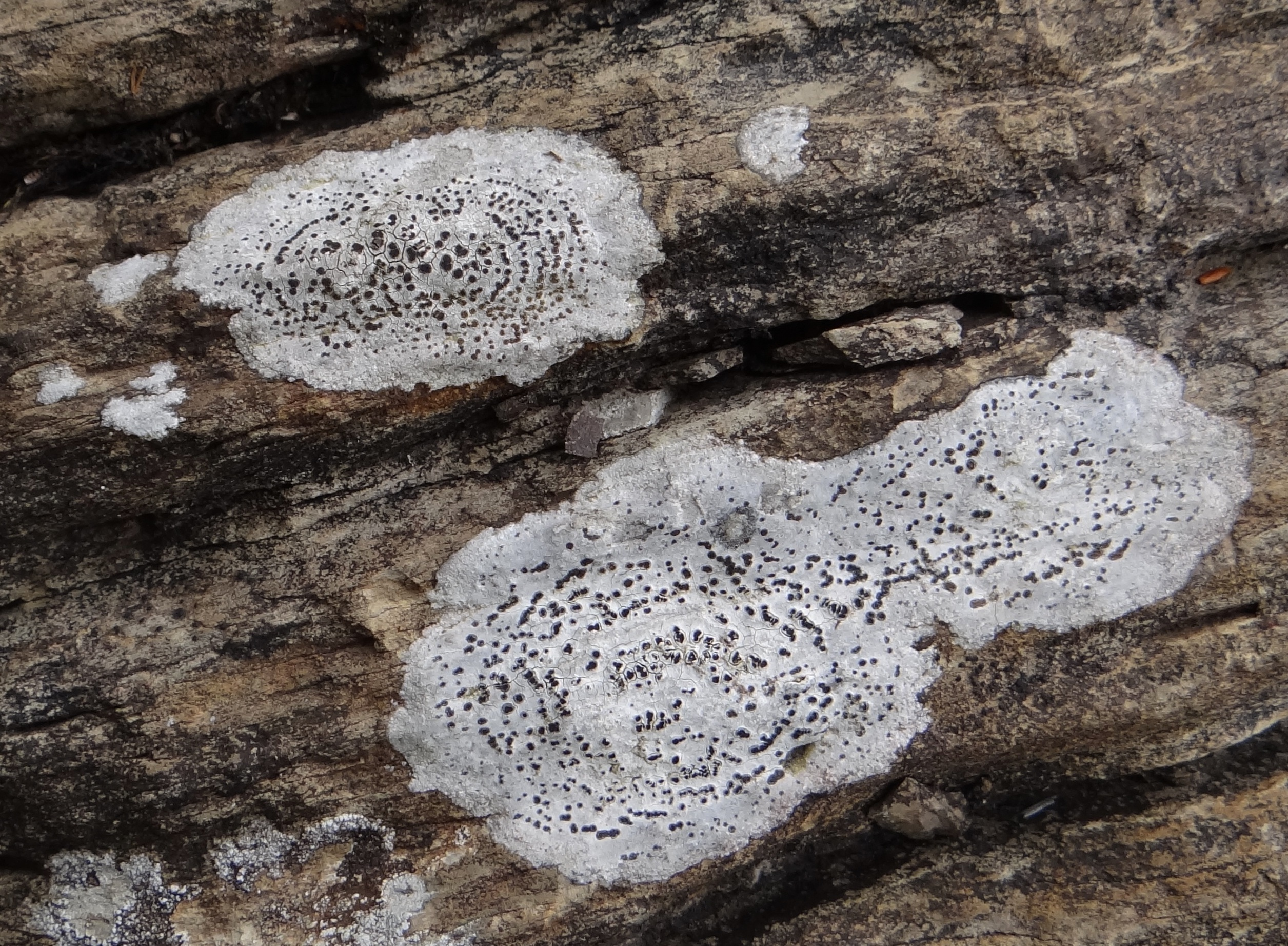

Scientific classification
- Domain: Eukaryota
- Kingdom: Fungi
- Division: Ascomycota
- Class: Lecanoromycetes
- Order: Rhizocarpales
- Family: Rhizocarpaceae
- Genus: Rhizocarpon
- Species: R. petraeum

Binomial name
- Rhizocarpon petraeum (Wulfen) A.Massal. (1852)

Synonyms
- Synonyms: Diplotomma petraeum; (Wulfen) Jatta; Rhizocarpon excentricum; (Ach.) Arnold; Lecidea petraea; (Wulfen) Ach.; Diplotomma excentricum; (Ach.) Jatta; Buellia petraea; (Wulfen) Branth & Rostr.; Lecidea concentrica var. excentrica; (Ach.) Leight.; Patellaria petraea; (Wulfen) DC.; Lecidea perluta; Nyl.; Lecidea excentrica; (Ach.) Röhl.; Buellia concentrica var. excentrica; (Ach.) H. Olivier; Rhizocarpon concentricum var. excentricum; (Ach.) P. Syd.; Lecidea petraea var. excentrica; Ach.; Verrucaria petraea; (Wulfen) Hoffm.; Rhizocarpon perlutum; (Nyl.) Zahlbr.; Lecidea variegata var. petraea; (Wulfen) Torss.; Rhizocarpon calcareum f. excentricum; (Ach.) Stein; Lichen petraeus; Wulfen; Rhizocarpon calcareum f. excentricum; (Ach.) Th. Fr.; Rhizocarpon petraeum var. excentricum; (Ach.) Arnold; Rhizocarpon atroalbum f. petraeum; (Wulfen) Arnold; Buellia excentrica; (Ach.) Eckfeldt; Verrucaria contigua petraea; (Wulfen) Hoffm.

= Rhizocarpon petraeum =

Species of lichen

Rhizocarpon petraeum is a species of saxicolous (rock-dwelling) crustose lichen in the family Rhizocarpaceae. It is widely distributed in Europe. This lichen forms a thin, chalk-white to grey crust that spreads over rock surfaces up to about 5 cm across, with scattered black disc-shaped fruiting bodies that rarely exceed 1 mm in diameter. It grows on sedimentary and volcanic rocks such as trachyte and basalt, and was first described in 1787 from specimens found in various locations across Europe.

== Taxonomy ==
The lichen was first described as Lichen petraeus in 1787 by Franz Xaver von Wulfen, but was transferred to the genus Rhizocarpon in 1852 by Abramo Bartolommeo Massalongo. Massalongo provided an extensive synonymy for the species, indicating it had been previously described under various names including Lecidea petraea by Acharius, Lecidea atro-alba by Fries, and Verrucaria petraea by Hoffmann, among others. The species was noted to be widely distributed across Europe, growing on sedimentary and volcanic rocks. Massalongo reported it as very common in the Veronese region, particularly on trachyte rocks of San Daniele, Padua and on basalts of the Vicentine Alps, and mentioned collecting specimens from the sandy areas of Recoaro.

== Description ==
Rhizocarpon petraeum forms a thin, rock-hugging crust that may spread over an area up to about 5 cm across. The thallus is usually continuous but develops fine cracks (rimose) as it ages, and small angular tiles (areoles) to 0.5 mm wide sometimes appear in patches. These areoles are chalk-white to mid-grey and have a matt, dull finish. A narrow, black prothallus—an advancing line of fungal threads—may be visible where the colony meets bare stone. Internally, a quick potassium hydroxide (K) spot test on the white medulla yields a yellow stain, and para-phenylenediamine (Pd) produces an orange reaction, both indicating the presence of stictic acid.

Black apothecia, the sexual fruit-bodies, are scattered across the thallus and rarely exceed 1 mm in diameter. Each disc is flat, glossy rather than frosted (non-pruinose), and typically round. The surrounding fungal wall (true exciple) remains prominent; under a hand lens it may show a faint pale dusting, and in thin section its outer rim is brown to dark blue-green while the inner margin is pale. Crystals within this wall dissolve and flash yellow when touched with K. Immediately above the spore layer sits an olive-brown epithecium that reacts the same way, turning yellow as its crystals dissolve. The spore-bearing hymenium beneath is colourless and comparatively tall (150–200 μm), supported by a dark-brown hypothecium that does not change with K. Each club-shaped ascus contains eight ascospores that are large (20–50 × 13–25 μm) and muriform—internally divided into many chambers like a brick wall. The spores are initially clear but darken as they over-mature.
