= Hans Runemark =

Swedish botanist and lichenologist (1927–2014)

Per Hans Bengt Runemark (7 January 1927 – 11 December 2014) was a Swedish botanist and lichenologist who served as professor of systematic botany at Lund University from 1970 to 1992. Born in Chicago, USA, he graduated from Lund University in 1956 with pioneering research on the lichen genus Rhizocarpon, introducing paper chromatography to lichenological taxonomy. Despite his brief career in lichenology, his multidisciplinary approach established new standards for monographic research in the field. Runemark later shifted his focus to studying evolutionary patterns of vascular plants in the Aegean Islands, particularly island endemics, using the archipelago as a natural laboratory to examine evolutionary processes in small plant populations. His botanical contributions were recognised with the OPTIMA Gold Medal in 1993, and several plant taxa have been named in his honour.

== Biography ==
Born in Chicago, (U.S.A.), he graduated in 1956 at Lund University, having started his studies there on the yellow species of the lichen, Rhizocarpon, in the late 1940s under the supervision of Ove Almborn. The work undertaken for his PhD was subsequently published as a monograph in the journal Opera Botanica as "Studies in Rhizocarpon".

In his research on Rhizocarpon, Runemark pioneered the application of paper chromatography for taxonomic work in lichenology. His published monograph contained comprehensive information about the anatomical features of both the asci and thallus structures, complemented by thorough species descriptions and geographic distribution maps covering Nordic and European territories. While he sought to incorporate genetic analysis through chromosome studies, he faced challenges developing methods to study the fungal component comparable to those used for vascular plants. Scholars continue to value his contribution as an important early example of modern monographic work in lichen taxonomy.

Following the completion of his doctorate at age 29, Runemark shifted his research focus away from lichens to pursue what he described as a "more attractive" area of study: investigating evolutionary patterns of vascular plant species in the Aegean Islands of Greece, with particular emphasis on island endemics. He used the plants in the archipelago as a natural laboratory to study evolutionary processes in small plant populations.

Runemark was appointed professor of systematic botany at Lund University in 1970, a position he held until 1992. In July 1993 he was awarded the OPTIMA Gold Medal in Borovetz, Bulgaria, in recognition of his botanical work. He died on 11 December 2014 at the age of almost 88 years.

== Legacy ==
Despite his relatively short tenure in lichenology, Runemark made a significant contribution through his taxonomic work on Rhizocarpon. His research emerged during a transformative period in the 1950s for lichen taxonomy, coinciding with other influential publications by researchers such as George Llano, Rolf Santesson, and Gunnar Degelius. What distinguishes Runemark's approach was his integration of the then-innovative paper chromatography technique with traditional morphological study, combined with detailed geographic analysis—a multidisciplinary methodology that helped establish new standards for monographic research in the field.

=== Eponymy ===
The plant taxa Omphalodes runemarkii Strid & Kit Tan, Iberis runemarkii Greuter & Burdet, Arenaria runemarkii Phitos, Cerastium runemarkii Möschl & Rech.f., Silene sedoides subsp. runemarkii Oxelman, Asperula lilaciflora subsp. runemarkii Ehrend. & Schönb.-Tem., Allium runemarkii Trigas & Tzanoud., Prunus runemarkii Eisenman, Thinopyrum runemarkii Á.Löve, Astragalus runemarkii Maassoumi & Podlech and Euphorbia sultan-hassei Strid, B.Bentzer, Bothmer, Engstrand & M.A.Gust., are named in his honour.
