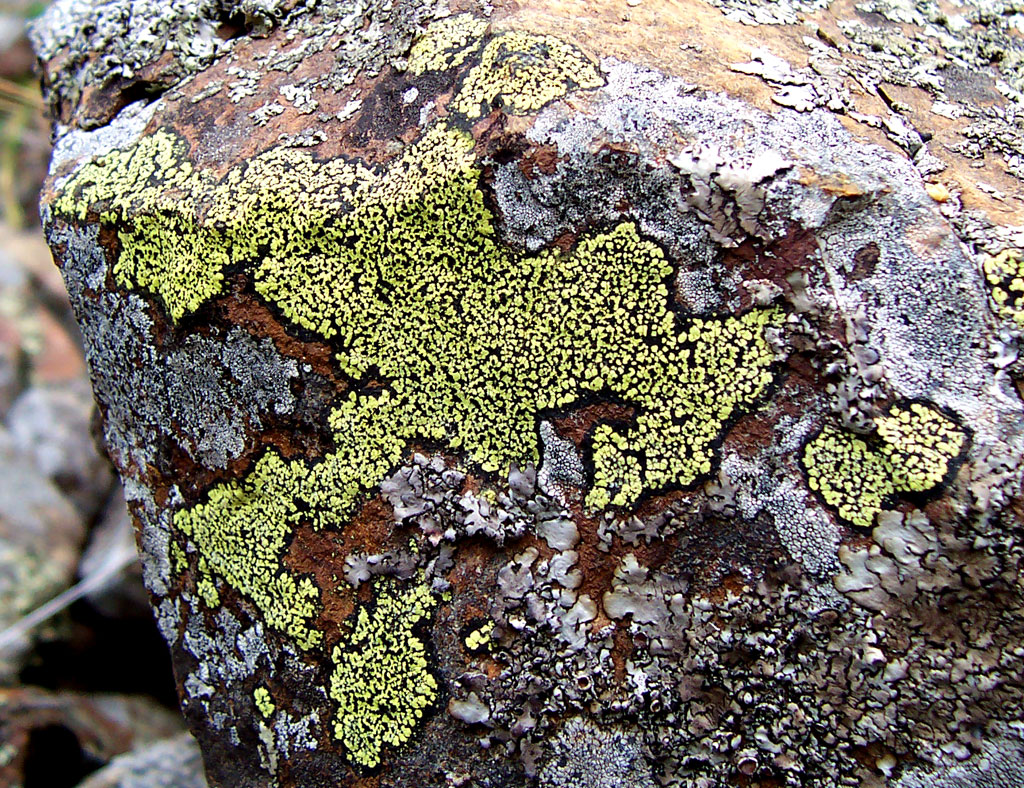
- Rhizocarpon geographicum

Scientific classification
- Kingdom: Fungi
- Division: Ascomycota
- Class: Lecanoromycetes
- Order: Rhizocarpales
- Family: Rhizocarpaceae
- Genus: Rhizocarpon; Ramond ex DC. (1805)

Type species
- Rhizocarpon geographicum (L.) DC. (1805)

Species
- See text

Synonyms
- List: Buellia sect. Catocarpus Körb. (1855); Catillariopsis (Stein) M.Choisy (1950); Catocarpus (Körb.) Arnold (1871); Catocarpus sect. Catillariopsis Stein (1879); Cormothecium A.Massal. (1854); Diphaeis Clem. (1909); Diphanis Clem. (1909); Lepidoma Link (1809); Phalodictyum Clem. (1909); Rehmia Kremp. (1861); Rhizocarponomyces Cif. & Tomas. (1953)

= Rhizocarpon =

Genus of lichens in the family Rhizocarpaceae

Rhizocarpon is a genus of crustose, saxicolous (or sometimes lichenicolous), lecideoid lichens in the family Rhizocarpaceae. The genus is common in arctic-alpine environments, but also occurs throughout temperate, subtropical, and even tropical regions. They are commonly known as map lichens because of the prothallus forming border-like bands between colonies in some species, like the common map lichen (Rhizocarpon geographicum).

== Taxonomy and phylogeny ==
Together with three small genera (Catolechia, Poeltinula and Epilichen), Rhizocarpon constitutes the family Rhizocarpaceae. Historically, ca 389 names have been used. However, many species concepts are ill-defined, many names have been synonymized and new species are regularly being described, so true number of species is not entirely clear as of now, but is estimated to be around 200.

In molecular work, the genus has also been shown to be paraphyletic, with closely related genera being nested within Rhizocarpon.

== Common traits ==
With so many species in a morphologically diverse genus it is difficult to say something general about morphology and anatomy and there will inevitably be some exceptions. However, they do share some key traits. They are all crustose and mostly saxicolous (rock-living), with some being lichenicolous (lichen parasites) on other saxicolous lichens. They are all lecideoid, meaning they have apothecia without a thallus margin containing algae.

== Ascus and ascospores ==
The genus has a distinct type of ascus, the Rhizocarpon-type, which is bitunicate with the inner ascus-wall being slightly apically thickened. Ascospores are considered important characters for determining species within the genus. They are either 2-celled (1-septate) or multi-celled (muriform) and are either hyaline or pigmented (green or brown), often with a characteristic halo (perispore) visible when viewed in a microscope. Asci contain eight, two or rarely one spore.

== Species ==
As of October 2022, Species Fungorum (in the Catalogue of Life) accepts 75 species of Rhizopogon.

- Rhizocarpon advenulum (Leight.) Hafellner & Poelt (1976)
- Rhizocarpon alpicola (Fr.) Rabenh. (1861)
- Rhizocarpon amphibium (Fr.) Körb. (1855)
- Rhizocarpon anaperum (Vain.) Vain. (1922)
- Rhizocarpon austroalpinum P.M.McCarthy, Elix & Kantvilas (2020) – Australia
- Rhizocarpon austroamphibium Fryday & Kantvilas (2012) – Australia
- Rhizocarpon badioatrum (Flörke ex Spreng.) Th.Fr. (1874)
- Rhizocarpon bicolor Elix & P.M.McCarthy (2019) – Australia
- Rhizocarpon caeruleoalbum (Kremp.) Zahlbr. (1926)
- Rhizocarpon caesium Fryday (2002) – Europe
- Rhizocarpon chioneum (Norman) Th.Fr. (1874)
- Rhizocarpon cinereonigrum Vain. (1922)
- Rhizocarpon cinereovirens (Müll.Arg.) Vain. (1922)
- Rhizocarpon clausum (C.Knight ex Shirley) Zahlbr. (1926)
- Rhizocarpon cleptophilum Alstrup & E.S.Hansen (2001) – Greenland
- Rhizocarpon copelandii (Körb.) Th.Fr. (1874)
- Rhizocarpon dahlii Øvstedal (2009)
- Rhizocarpon dimelaenae Timdal (2004)
- Rhizocarpon diploschistinum McCune (2011)
- Rhizocarpon disporum (Nägeli ex Hepp) Müll.Arg. (1879)
- Rhizocarpon distinctum Th.Fr. (1874)
- Rhizocarpon eupetraeoides (Nyl.) Blomb. & Forssell (1880)
- Rhizocarpon exiguum P.M.McCarthy, Elix & Kantvilas (2020) – Australia
- Rhizocarpon expallescens Th.Fr. (1874)
- Rhizocarpon ferax H.Magn. (1948)
- Rhizocarpon flavomedullosum Elix & P.M.McCarthy (2014) – Australia
- Rhizocarpon furfurosum H.Magn. & Poelt (1955)
- Rhizocarpon geminatum Körb. (1855)
- Rhizocarpon geographicum (L.) DC. (1805)
- Rhizocarpon grande (Flörke ex Flot.) Arnold (1871)
- Rhizocarpon haidense Brodo & Fryday (2020)
- Rhizocarpon hochstetteri (Körb.) Vain. (1922)
- Rhizocarpon inarense (Vain.) Vain. (1898)
- Rhizocarpon infernulum (Nyl.) Lynge (1934)
- Rhizocarpon intermediellum Räsänen (1943)
- Rhizocarpon jemtlandicum Malme (1914)
- Rhizocarpon johnstonii C.W.Dodge (1948)
- Rhizocarpon kerguelense C.W.Dodge (1948)
- Rhizocarpon lavatum (Ach.) Hazsl. (1884)
- Rhizocarpon lecanorinum Anders (1923)
- Rhizocarpon lusitanicum (Nyl.) Arnold (1871)
- Rhizocarpon macrosporum Räsänen (1943)
- Rhizocarpon malvinae Fryday (2019) – Falkland Islands
- Rhizocarpon mawsonii C.W.Dodge (1948)
- Rhizocarpon ochrolechiae (Poelt & Nimis) Hafellner (1992)
- Rhizocarpon oederi (Ach.) Körb. (1861)
- Rhizocarpon oxydatum Fryday (2004) – New Zealand
- Rhizocarpon ozsoyae Halıcı, E.Möller, Timdal, Kahraman Yiğit & Bölükbaşı (2022) – Antarctica
- Rhizocarpon pallidum (Akramova) Kudratov (2002)
- Rhizocarpon petraeum (Wulfen) A.Massal. (1852)
- Rhizocarpon polycarpum (Hepp) Th.Fr. (1874)
- Rhizocarpon postumum (Nyl.) Arnold (1871)
- Rhizocarpon purpurascens Fryday (2004) – New Zealand
- Rhizocarpon pusillum Runemark (1956)
- Rhizocarpon quinonum McCune, Timdal & Bendiksby (2016) – Alaska
- Rhizocarpon reductum Th.Fr. (1874)
- Rhizocarpon richardii (Lamy ex Nyl.) Zahlbr. (1926)
- Rhizocarpon ridescens (Nyl.) Zahlbr. (1905)
- Rhizocarpon roridulum (Th.Fr.) Zahlbr. (1926)
- Rhizocarpon saurinum (W.A.Weber) Bungartz (2004)
- Rhizocarpon simillimum (Anzi) Lettau (1912)
- Rhizocarpon sipmanianum Kalb & Aptroot (2017)
- Rhizocarpon smaragdulum Davydov & Yakovch. (2017) – Siberia
- Rhizocarpon subareolatum E.S.Hansen (2007) – Greenland
- Rhizocarpon subgeminatum Eitner (1911)
- Rhizocarpon sublavatum Fryday (2000) – Europe
- Rhizocarpon submodestum (Vain.) Vain. (1922)
- Rhizocarpon subpostumum (Nyl.) Arnold (1877)
- Rhizocarpon sulphurosum (Tuck. ex Willey) Lendemer (2010)
- Rhizocarpon sunchonense S.Y.Kondr. & Hur (2018) – South Korea
- Rhizocarpon superficiale (Schaer.) Malme (1914)
- Rhizocarpon tephromelae Øvstedal (2009)
- Rhizocarpon timdalii Ihlen & Fryday (2002) – Europe; North America
- Rhizocarpon tinei (Tornab.) Runemark (1956)
- Rhizocarpon torquatum P.M.McCarthy, J.A.Elix & G.Kantvilas (2020)/
- Rhizocarpon transiens Eitner (1911)
- Rhizocarpon tungurahuae Etayo & Palice (2017)
- Rhizocarpon umbilicatum (Ramond) Flagey (1894)
- Rhizocarpon umense (H.Magn.) A.Nordin (2005)
- Rhizocarpon vigilans P.M.McCarthy & Elix (2014) – Australia
- Rhizocarpon viridiatrum (Wulfen) Körb. (1855)
- Rhizocarpon vulcani May.Inoue (2001) – Japan

== Gallery ==
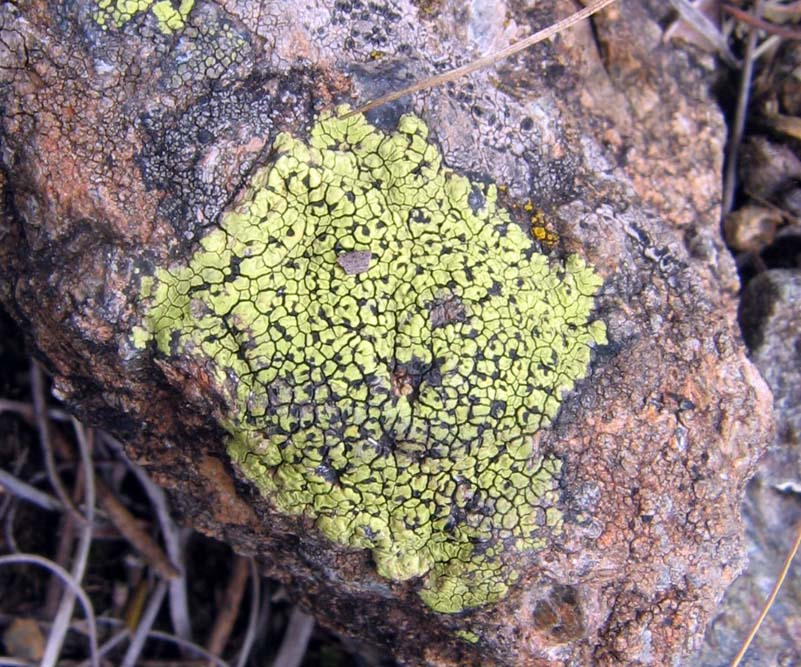
Rhizocarpon sp. on a mountain Zlatibor, Serbia

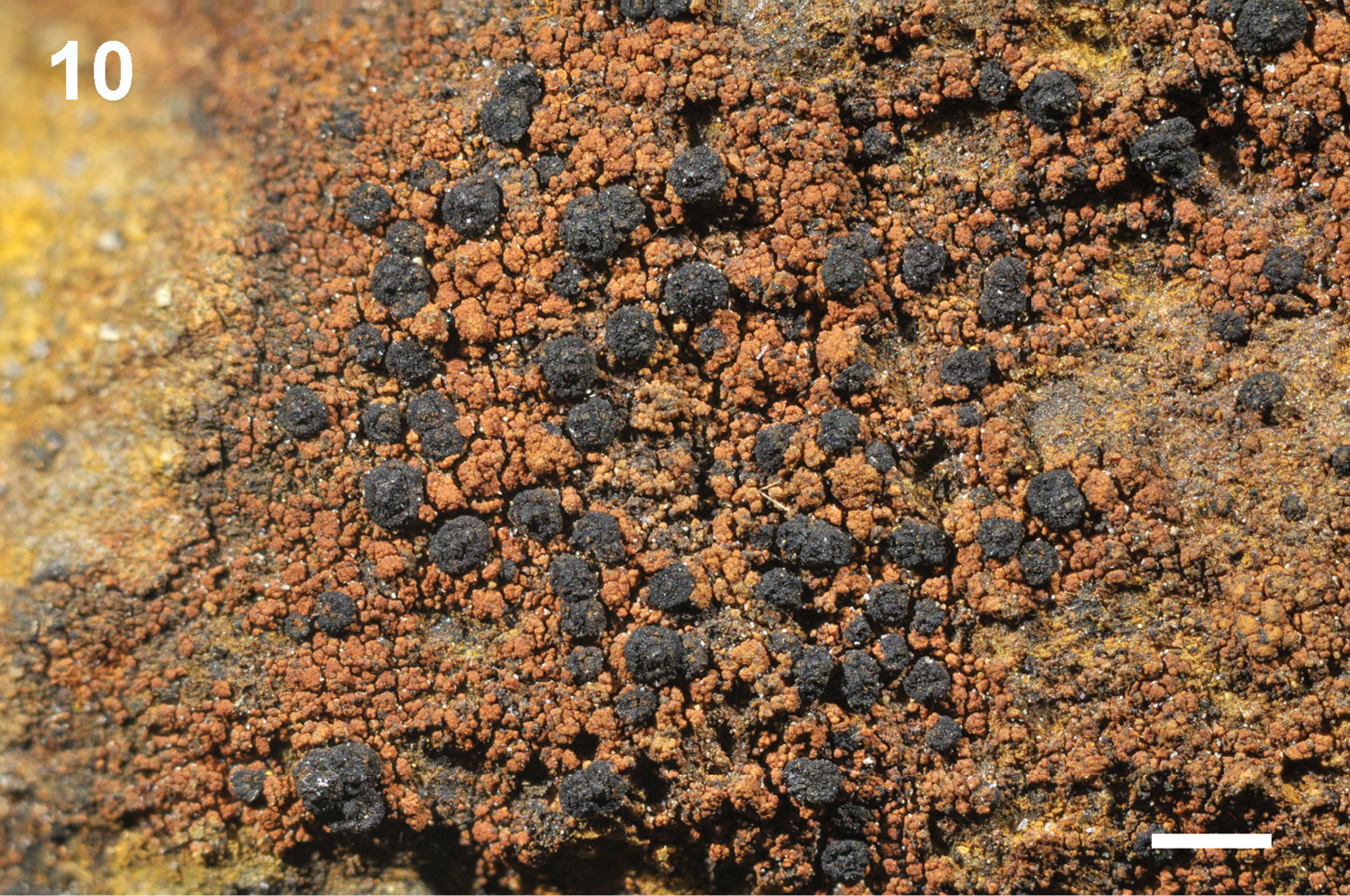
Rhizocarpon pycnocarpoides
