= August von Krempelhuber =

German lichenologist (1813–1882)

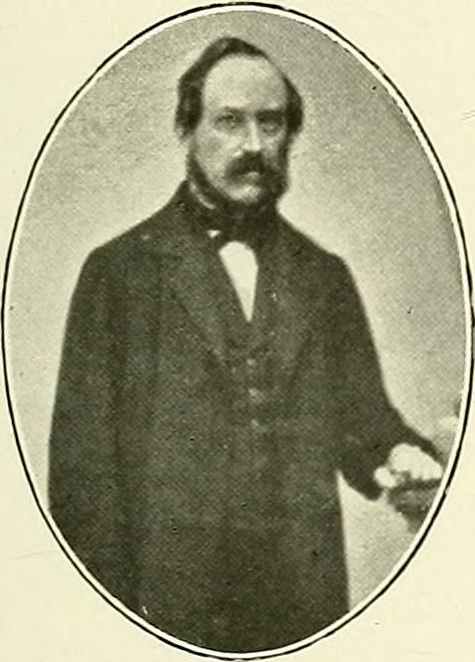
August von Krempelhuber

August von Krempelhuber (14 September 1813 – 2 October 1882) was a German lichenologist born in Munich.

Born into nobility, he studied forestry at the Ludwig-Maximilians-Universität München. Through his work in forestry, he developed an interest in lichens, subsequently publishing numerous articles in the field of lichenology. He traveled widely throughout Europe, and knew several languages, including classical Latin and Greek. His analysis of lichens included species from both European and exotic locales (Argentina, Brazil, New Zealand, et al.).

Through his collection and evaluation of lichenological literature (up to 1871), he made strides in establishing order out of the confusing nomenclatural situation that existed at the time. Among his written works is Geschichte und Litteratur der Lichenologie, a book on the history and literature of lichenology from antiquity up to the year 1865.

His collection of nearly 20,000 specimens is now kept at the Botanische Staatssammlung München. The fungi genus Krempelhuberia was named in his honor by Abramo Bartolommeo Massalongo.

== See also ==
- Category:Taxa named by August von Krempelhuber
