= Rhizocarpic acid =

Names
- IUPAC name methyl (2S)-2-[[2-(3-hydroxy-5-oxo-4-phenylfuran-2-ylidene)-2-phenylacetyl]amino]-3-phenylpropanoate

Identifiers
CAS Number	18463-11-1
3D model (JSmol)	Interactive image
ChEBI	CHEBI:144213
ChemSpider	21470453
PubChem CID	54733074
- InChI: InChI=1S/C28H23NO6/c1-34-27(32)21(17-18-11-5-2-6-12-18)29-26(31)23(20-15-9-4-10-16-20)25-24(30)22(28(33)35-25)19-13-7-3-8-14-19/h2-16,21,30H,17H2,1H3,(H,29,31)/b25-23-/t21-/m0/s1 Key: DKDGWAKCXBFTMM-KFHWJWAOSA-N
- SMILES: COC(=O)[C@H](CC1=CC=CC=C1)NC(=O)/C(=C\2/C(=C(C(=O)O2)C3=CC=CC=C3)O)/C4=CC=CC=C4

Properties
Chemical formula	C_{28}H_{23}NO_{6}
Molar mass	469.493 g·mol^{−1}
- Except where otherwise noted, data are given for materials in their standard state (at 25 °C [77 °F], 100 kPa). Infobox references

Rhizocarpic acid is an organic compound with the molecular formula C_{28}H_{23}NO_{6} which has been isolated from the lichen Rhizocarpon geographicum and other lichens.
