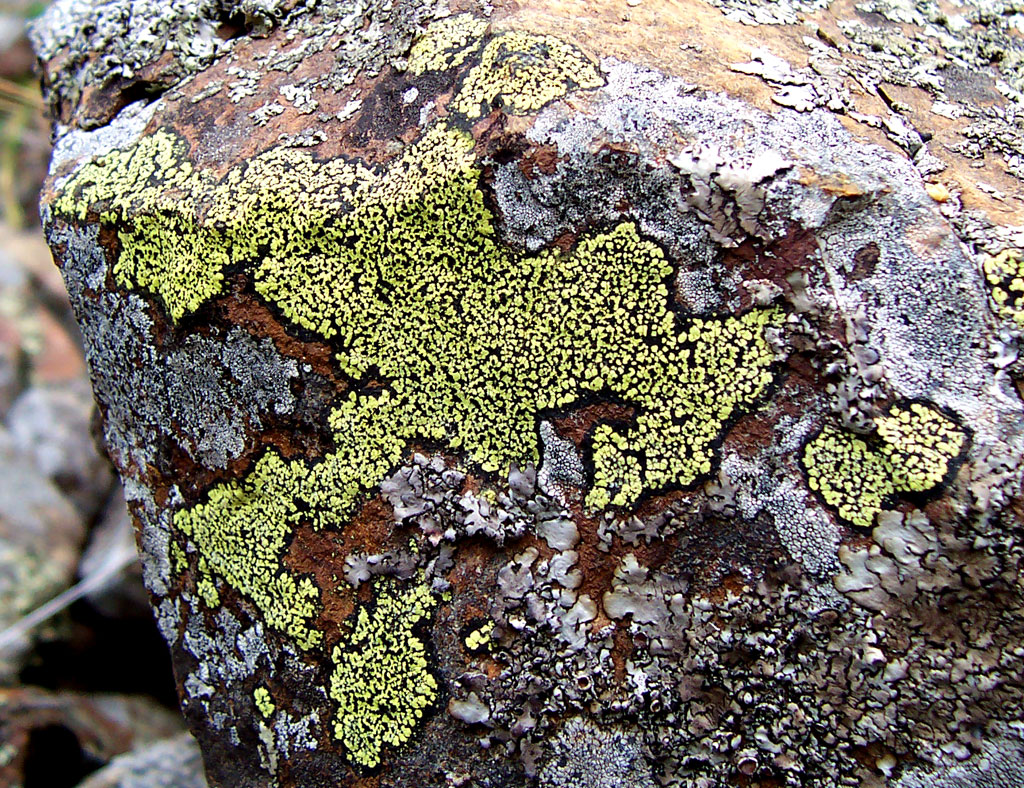
- Rhizocarpon geographicum

Scientific classification
- Kingdom: Fungi
- Division: Ascomycota
- Class: Lecanoromycetes
- Order: Rhizocarpales
- Family: Rhizocarpaceae; M.Choisy ex Hafellner (1984)

Type genus
- Rhizocarpon Ramond ex DC. (1805)

Genera
- Catolechia; Epilichen; Haugania; Poeltinula; Rhizocarpon

= Rhizocarpaceae =

Family of lichen-forming fungi

Rhizocarpaceae is a family of lichen-forming fungi; together with the family Sporastatiaceae it constitutes the order Rhizocarpales in the Ascomycota, class Lecanoromycetes. These lichens are primarily rock-dwellers that form thin, paint-like crusts tightly attached to stone surfaces, though some species grow as small scales or radiating rosettes. The family includes five genera found mainly in cool to cold regions around the world, where they colonize exposed siliceous and basic rocks in sunny locations. Most species reproduce through small black disc-shaped fruiting bodies that sit flush with or slightly above the crusty surface, and they often contain distinctive chemical compounds that help with identification.

== Description ==
Members of the Rhizocarpaceae are mostly rock-dwelling crustose lichens—forming a thin, paint-like layer that adheres tightly to the substrate—although some species grow as small, scale-like squamules or as placodioid rosettes whose lobed margins radiate from a central point. Their upper surface (the cortex) is usually present and may be smooth, cracked, or warted and display an array of hues from grey and green to yellow-green when rhizocarpic acid is concentrated near the surface. A few species begin life on the thallus of another lichen (lichenicolous) and may never form a thallus of their own, producing only reproductive bodies on the host. Vegetative propagules such as soralia (powdery eruptions of algal–fungal tissue) or blastidia (tiny outgrowths that detach as whole-thallus clones) occur sporadically. The photosynthetic partner is always a green alga with rounded cells (a chlorococcoid photobiont).

Sexual reproduction takes place in black apothecia that sit flush with, or project slightly above, the thallus. These discs may be round, angular, or on rare occasions slit-like; they lack a pale outer rim, a condition termed lecideine. The fleshy rim (true exciple) is built from radiating or intertwined fungal threads (hyphae) and may contain crystals visible through polarising light. Inside, the colourless hymenium turns blue with iodine (I+ blue), revealing its amyloid nature. Slender, branching paraphysoids weave through the hymenium, often swelling at their tips and sometimes capped by a dark pigment. The asci are fissitunicate—meaning two wall layers separate during spore release—and carry one to eight ascospores. When mature, the spores are one-celled to muriform (divided by several internal walls), colourless to dark olive-brown, and wrapped in a gelatinous envelope (perispore). Asexual reproduction is rare and involves pycnidia, minute flask-shaped structures sunken in the thallus that release cylindrical conidia. Alongside rhizocarpic acid, the medulla may host various depsides, depsidones, and fatty acids that aid species identification through simple chemical spot tests.

== Ecology ==
Collectively, the family's five genera favour siliceous or basic rock, with occasional records from nutrient-poor soils, and are widespread in cool to cold regions where exposed stone provides a stable, sunlit habitat.

== Genera ==
- Catolechia Flot. (1850)
- Epilichen Clem. (1909)
- Haugania E.J.Möller & Timdal (2024) – 2 spp.
- Poeltinula Hafellner (1984)
- Rhizocarpon Ramond ex DC. (1805)
