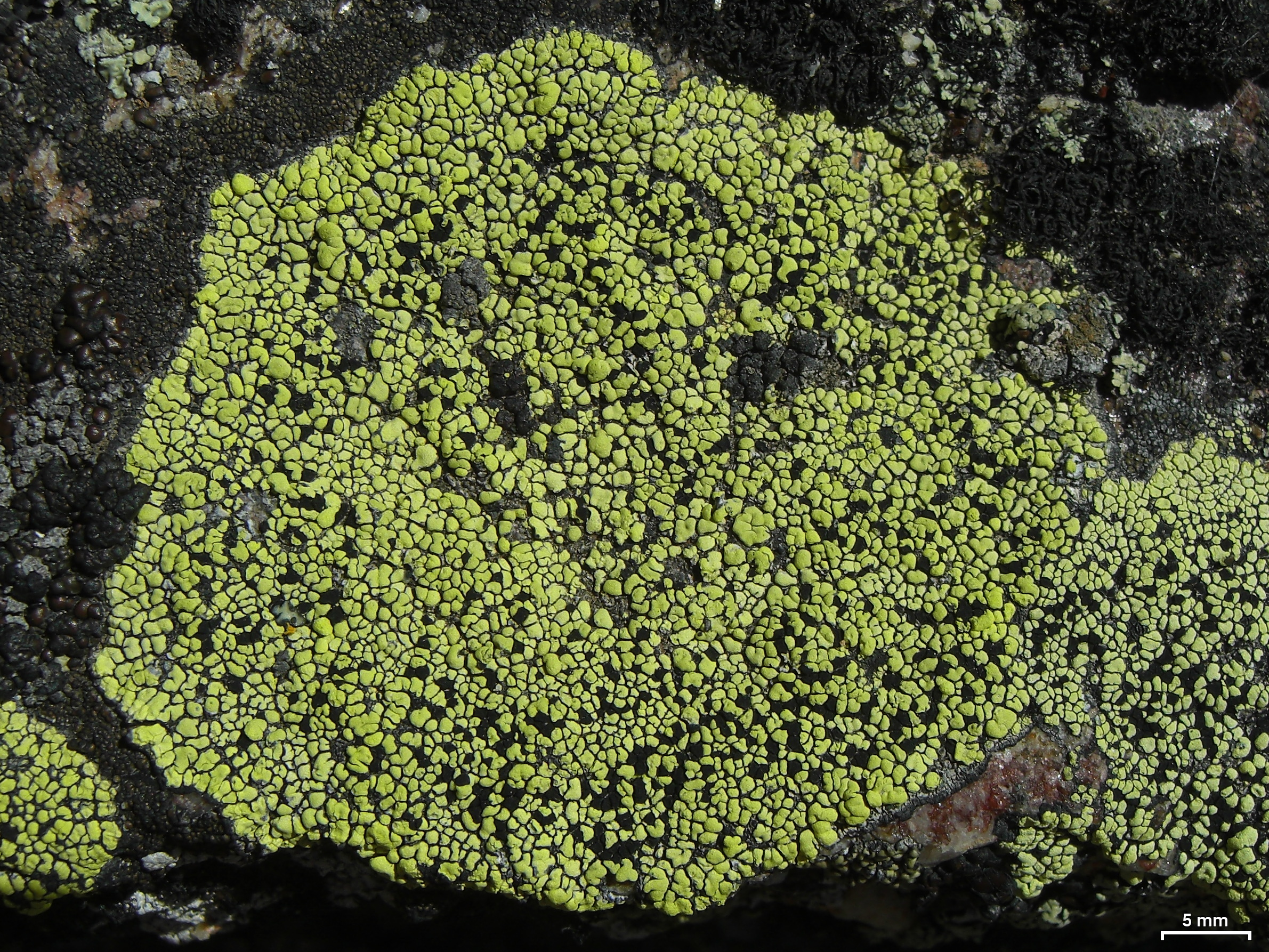
- Rhizocarpon superficiale in Mokelumne Wilderness, California

Scientific classification
- Kingdom: Fungi
- Division: Ascomycota
- Class: Lecanoromycetes
- Subclass: Lecanoromycetidae
- Order: Rhizocarpales; Miądl. & Lutzoni ex Miądl. & Lutzoni (2016)

Type genus
- Rhizocarpon Ramond ex DC. (1805)

Families
- Rhizocarpaceae; Sporastatiaceae

Synonyms
- Sporastatiales Lumbsch & Leavitt (2018)

= Rhizocarpales =

Order of fungi

The Rhizocarpales are an order of lichen-forming fungi in the subclass Lecanoromycetidae of the class Lecanoromycetes. It has two families, Rhizocarpaceae and Sporastatiaceae, which contain mostly crustose lichens.

== Taxonomy ==
The order was originally proposed by the lichenologists Jolanta Miądlikowska and Francois Lutzoni in 2007, following a molecular phylogenetic analysis of the Lecanoromycetes. However, the name was not validly published according to article 32.1(d) of the International Code of Nomenclature for algae, fungi, and plants, because it was not "accompanied by a description or diagnosis or by a reference to a previously and effectively published description or diagnosis". The same authors published the name validly in 2016.

In 2017, Pradeep Divakar and colleagues used a then-recently developed "temporal phylogenetic" approach to identify temporal bands for specific taxonomic ranks in the Lecanoromycetes, suggesting that groups of species that diverged within the temporal band of 176–194 myr (million years ago) represent orders. They proposed to split the Rhizocarpales into two orders, the Rhizocarpales sensu stricto, and the Sporastatiales, reasoning that these groups split from each other at 208 myr, outside the temporal band they set for orders. This split was not accepted in a later critical analysis of the temporal phylogenetic approach to fungal classification.

== Description ==
Rhizocarpales species are mostly lichenised, with a few lichenicolous species. They have a crustose thallus that is often underlain by a black prothallus. The photobiont partner is chlorococcoid–a spherical, single-celled green algal species. The ascomata are in the form of an apothecium that is either immersed in the substrate or sessile, lecideine or emarginate. The hamathecium (the hyphae between the asci) consist of unbranched, amyloid paraphyses in the Sporastatiaceae, and branched and anastomosing paraphyses in the Rhizocarpaceae. The asci are semifissitunicate, meaning that the two walls of the ascus do not completely separate during the discharge of the ascospore. Asci have an amyloid tholus (the thickened inner part of the apex of the ascus), which, in the Sporastatiaceae, lacks other structures; in the Rhizocarpaceae, the tholus is weakly amyloid with a stronger amyloid cap. Ascospores number 1 to 8 in the Rhizocarpaceae, to many (about 100) in the Sporastatiaceae. The ascospores are non-septate in the Sporastatiaceae or transversally septate to muriform in the Rhizocarpaceae. In both families, they are ellipsoid, hyaline to dark brown, and non-amyloid. The conidiomata are in the form of pycnidia. Secondary chemicals associated with the Rhizocarpales include depsides, depsidones, and chemical derivatives of pulvinic acid.

== Habitat ==
Rhizocarpales species grow on rocks, or are lichenicolous on other lichens that grow on rocks. In a few instances they are epiphytic on bark.

== Families and genera ==
As of April 2024, Species Fungorum (in the Catalogue of Life) accepts 2 families, 6 genera, and 91 species in the Rhizocarpales.

- Rhizocarpaceae M.Choisy ex Hafellner (1984)

Catolechia – 1 sp.
Epilichen – 1 sp.
Poeltinula – 2 spp.
Rhizocarpon – 80 spp.

- Sporastatiaceae Bendiksby & Timdal (2013)

Sporastatia – 4 spp.
Toensbergia – 3 spp.
