= List of lichenicolous fungi of Iceland =

This list of lichenicolous fungi of Iceland is based on a compiled checklist from 2009 with the taxonomy of the fungi revised in 2022 using the Global Biodiversity Information Facility online database.

- Abrothallus parmeliarum (Sommerf.) Arnold
- Arthonia epiphyscia Nyl.
- Arthonia fuscopurpurea (Tul.) R.Sant.
- Arthonia gelidae R.Sant.
- Arthonia intexta Almq.
- Arthonia stereocaulina (Ohlert) R.Sant.
- Arthonia varians (Davies)Nyl.
- Arthophacopsis parmeliarum Hafellner
- Bachmanniomyces punctum (A.Massal.) Diederich & Pino-Bodas (listed as Phaeopyxis punctum (A.Massal.) Rambold, Triebel & Coppins)
- Bachmanniomyces uncialicola (Zopf) D.Hawksw.
- Buellia adjuncta Th.Fr.
- Carbonea supersparsa (Nyl.) Hertel
- Carbonea vitellinaria (Nyl.) Hertel
- Cecidonia umbonella (Nyl.) Triebel & Rambold
- Cecidonia xenophana (Körb. Triebel & Rambold
- Cercidospora epipolytropa (Mudd.) Arnold
- Cercidospora macrospora (Uloth) Hafellner & Nav.-Ros.
- Cercidospora punctillata (Nyl.) R.Sant.
- Cercidospora stereocaulorum (Arnold) Hafellner
- Cercidospora thamnoliicola Ihlen
- Cercidospora trypetheliza (Nyl.) Hafellner & Obermayer
- Cercidospora verrucosaria (Linds.) Arnold
- Clypeococcum placopsiphilum Øvst. & D.Hawksw.
- Collemopsidium cephalodiorum (Triebel & Grube) Grube (listed as Cercidispora cephalodiorum Triebel & Grube)
- Corticifraga peltigerae (Nyl.) D.Hawksw. & R.Sant.
- Didymellopsis pulposi (Zopf) Grube & Hafellner
- Endococcus fusiger Th.Fr. & Almq.
- Endococcus propinquus (Körb.) D.Hawksw.
- Endococcus rugulosus Nyl. (also listed as Endococcus perpusillus Nyl. which is a synonym of E. rugulosus)
- Epibryon conductrix (Norman) Nik.Hoffmann & Hafellner
- Geltingia associata (Th.Fr.) Alstrup & D.Hawksw.
- Heterocephalacria bachmannii (Diederich & M.S.Christ.) Millanes & Wedin (listed as Syzygospora bachmannii Diederich & M.S.Christ. in Diederich)
- Homostegia piggotii (Berk. & Broome) P.Karst.
- Intralichen christiansenii (D.Hawksw. & M.S.Cole
- Lasiosphaeriopsis christiansenii Alstrup & D.Hawksw.
- Lasiosphaeriopsis stereocaulicola (Linds.) O.E.Erikss. & R.Sant.
- Lichenochora lepidiotae (Anzi) Etayo & Nav.-Ros. (listed as Sphaerulina lepidiotae (Anzi) Vain.)
- Lichenodiplis lecanorae (Vouaaux) Dyko & D.Hawksw.
- Lichenopeltella cetrariicola (Nyl.) R.Sant.
- Lichenopeltella cladoniarum E.S.Hansen & Alstrup
- Lichenosticta alcicornaria (Linds.) D.Hawksw.
- Merismatium nigritellum (Nyl.) Vouaux
- Muellerella erratica (A.Massal.) Hafellner & Volk.John (listed as Muellerella pygmaea var. athallina (Müll.Arg) Triebel)
- Muellerella pygmaea (Körb.) D.Hawksw.
  - Muellerella pygmaea var. pygmaea
- Muellerella ventosicola (Mudd) D.Hawksw. (listed as Muellerella pygmaea var. ventosicola (Mudd) D.Hawksw.)
- Niesslia peltigericola (D.Hawksw.) Etayo (listed as Raciborskiomyces peltigericola (D. Hawksw.) M.E.Barr.)
- Opegrapha pulvinata Rehm (synonym of O. pulvinata Rehm ex Arnold)
- Opegrapha stereocaulicola Alstrup & D.Hawksw.
- Phaeocalicium populneum (Brond. ex Duby) A.F.W. Schmidt
- Polycoccum amygdalariae F.Berger & Triebel
- Polycoccum deformans R.Sant. (ined.)
- Polycoccum pulvinatum (Eitner) R.Sant.
- Polycoccum trypethelioides (Th.Fr.) R.Sant.
- Polycoccum vermicularium (Linds.) D.Hawksw.
- Pronectria erythrinella (Nyl.) Lowen
- Punctelia oxyspora (Tul.) Dicakar, A.Crespo & Lumbsch (listed as Phacopsis oxyspora (Tul.) Triebel & Rambold)
- Pronectria robergei (Mont. & Desm.) Lowen
- Pronectria solorinae nom prov.
- Protothelenella croceae (Bagl.& Carestia) Hafellner & H.Mayrhofer
- Pseudopyrenidium tartaricola (Linds.) Nav.-Ros., Zhurb. & Cl.Roux (listed as Weddellomyces tartaricola (Linds.) Alstrup & D.Hawksw.)
- Pyrenidium actinellum Nyl.
- Rhagadostoma brevisporum (Navar.-Ros. & Hladun) Navar.-Ros.
- Rhagadostoma lichenicola (DeNot) Keissl.
- Roselliniopsis gelidaria (Mudd) Matzer (listed as Polycoccum gelidarium (Mudd) D.Hawksw.)
- Sclerococcum amygdalariae (Triebel) Ertz & Diederich (listed as Dactylospora amygdalariae Triebel)
- Sclerococcum athallinum (Müll.Arg.) Ertz & Diederich (listed as Dactylospora athallina (Müll.Arg.) Hafellner)
- Sclerococcum attendendum (Nyl.) Ertz & Diederich (listed as Dactylospora attendenda (Nyl.) Arnold)
- Sclerococcum deminuta (Th.Fr.) Ertz & Diederich (listed as Dactylospora deminuta (Th.Fr.) Triebel)
- Sclerococcum frigidum (Hafellner) Ertz & Diederich (listed as Dactylospora frigida Hafellner)
- Sclerococcum gelidarium Etayo & F.Berger
- Sclreococcum glaucomarioides (Wiley ex Tuck.) Ertz & Diederich (listed as Dactylospora glaucomarioides (Willey ex Tuck.) Hafellner)
- Sclerococcum parasiticum (Flörke) Ertz & Diederich (listed as Dactylospora parasitica (Flörke) Zopf)
- Sclerococcum parellarium (Nyl.) Ertz & Diederich (listed as Dactylospora parellaria (Nyl.) Arnold)
- Sclerococcum purpurescens (Triebel) Ertz & Diederich (listed as Dactylospora purpurascens Triebel)
- Sclerococcum sphaerale (Ach.) Fr.
- Scutula krempelhuberi Körb.
- Scutula stereocaulorum (Anzi) Körb.
- Scutula tuberculosa (Th.Fr.) Rehm
- Sphaerellothecium araneosum (Rehm ex Arnold) Zopf
- Sphaeropezia santessonii (Zhurb., Etayo & Diederich) Baloch & Wedin (listed as Odontotrema santessonii Zhurb., Etayo & Diederich)
- Stigmidium allogenum (Nyl.) D.Hawksw. (listed as Stigmidium psorae (Anzi) Hafellner)
- Stigmidium marinum (Deakin) Swinscow
- Stigmidium peltideae (Vain.) R.Sant.
- Stigmidium stygnospilum (Minks) R.Sant.
- Tetramelas pulverulentus (Anzi) A.Nordin & Tibell
- Tetramelas phaeophysciae A.Nordin & Tibell
- Thamnogalla crombiei (Mudd) D.Hawksw.
- Xenonectriella ornamentata (D.Hawksw.) Rossman (listed as Pronectria ornamentata (D.Hawksw.) Lowen)
- Zwackhiomacromyces hyalosporus (Alstrup, D.Hawksw. & R.Sant.) Etayo & F.Berger (listed as Pyrenidium hyalosporum Alstrup, D.Hawksw. & R.Sant.)
- Zwackhiomyces dispersus (J.Lahm ex Körb.) Triebel & Grube (listed as Stigmidium conspurcans (Th.Fr.) Triebel & R.Sant.)
