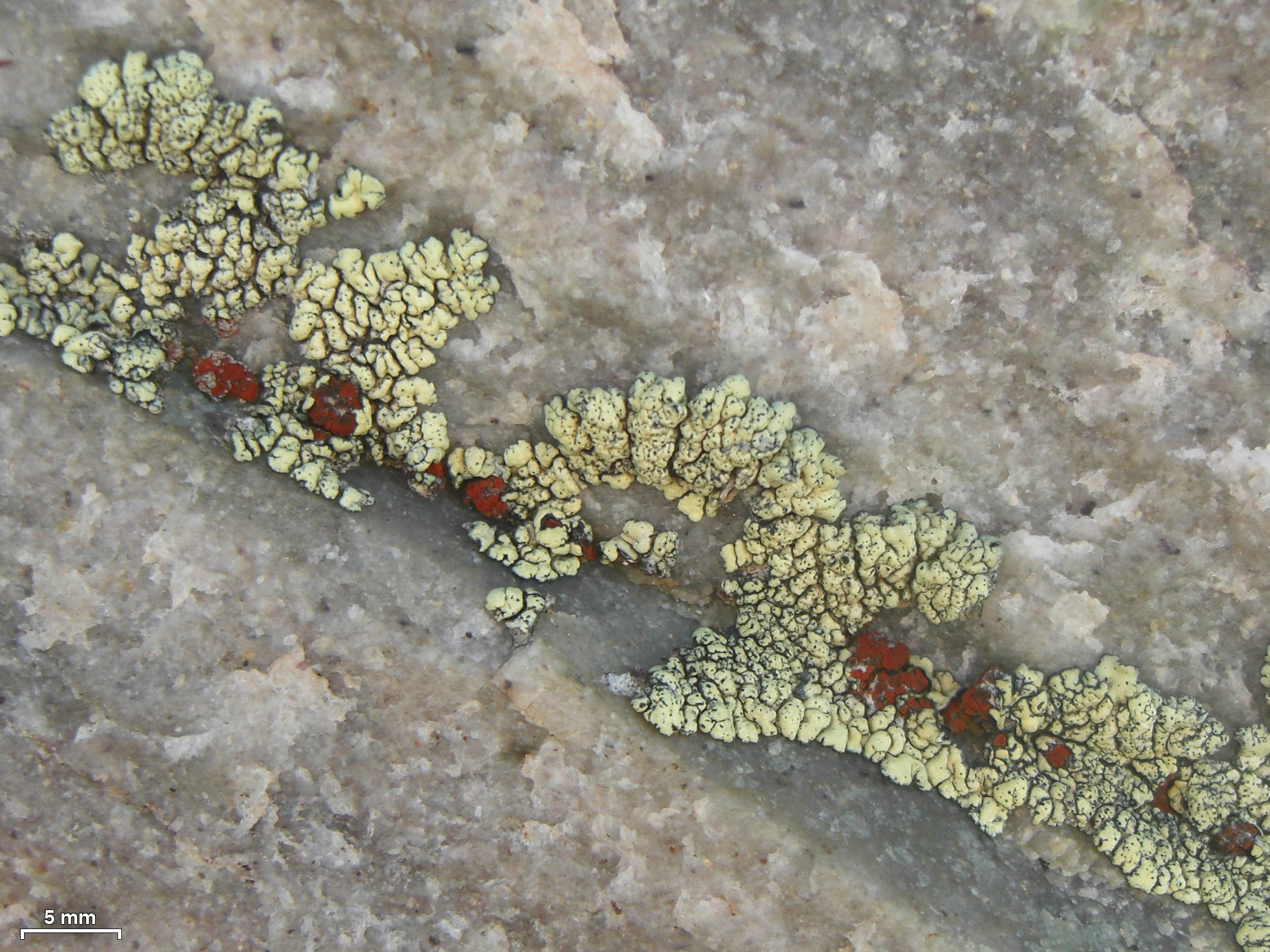
- Erichansenia epithallina (red) growing parasitically on the crustose lichen Rhizoplaca novomexicana

Scientific classification
- Kingdom: Fungi
- Division: Ascomycota
- Class: Lecanoromycetes
- Order: Teloschistales
- Family: Teloschistaceae
- Genus: Erichansenia
- Species: E. epithallina

Binomial name
- Erichansenia epithallina (Lynge) S.Y.Kondr., Kärnefelt & A.Thell (2020)

Synonyms
- Caloplaca epithallina Lynge (1940)

= Erichansenia epithallina =

Species of lichen-forming fungus

Erichansenia epithallina is a species of saxicolous (rock-dwelling), crustose lichen in the family Teloschistaceae. It is also a lichenicolous lichen species, meaning that it grows on other lichens. Many host genera have been recorded. It occurs in Europe and North America, including Arctic regions.

== Taxonomy ==
The lichen was first formally described as a new species in 1940 by Norwegian lichenologist Bernt Arne Lynge, who placed it in the genus Caloplaca. In 2020, Sergey Kondratyuk, Ingvar Kärnefelt, and Arne Thell transferred it to the newly circumscribed genus Erichansenia, in which it is the type species.

== Habitat and distribution ==
Erichansenia epithallina is a lichenicolous lichen species, meaning that it grows on other lichens. Many host genera have been recorded: Acarospora, Aspicilia, Dimelaena, Lecanora, Melanelia, Pleopsidium, Psorinia, Rhizocarpon, Rhizoplaca, Stereocaulon, Tephromela, and Umbilicaria.

It occurs in Europe and in North America. The lichen has also been recorded from both the Russian Arctic (Chukotka and Taymyr Peninsula) and the American Arctic (Alaska). Host lichens in these locations are Rhizoplaca chrysoleuca and R. melanophthalma. In Italy, the distribution of Erichansenia epithallina is restricted to dry-continental alpine valleys. In Nepal, E. epithallina has been reported from 4,350 to 4,450 m elevation in a compilation of published records; this reported range lies above the tree line used in the study.
