= Cercidospora melanophthalmae =

Scientific classification
- Kingdom: Fungi
- Division: Ascomycota
- Class: Dothideomycetes
- Order: Dothideales
- Family: incertae sedis
- Genus: Cercidospora
- Species: C. melanophthalmae

Binomial name
- Cercidospora melanophthalmae Nav.-Ros., Calat. & Hafellner (2013)

Species of fungus

Cercidospora melanophthalmae is a species of lichenicolous fungus in the genus Cercidospora but it has not been assigned to a family. It was first discovered in Catalonia growing on Rhizoplaca melanophthalma but has since been found around Europe, Asia, Africa and in Greenland, always on the same host species.
