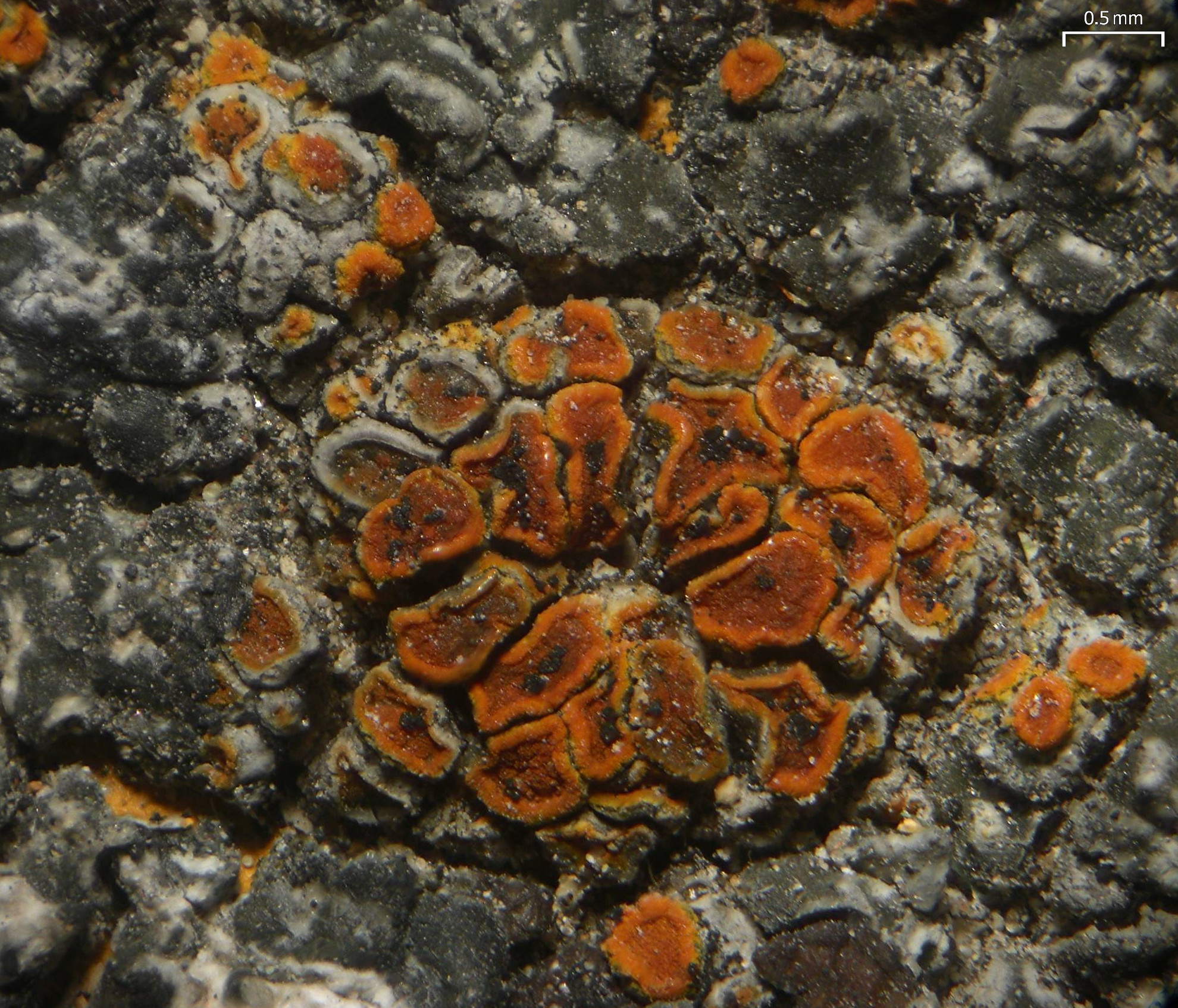
- Erichansenia epithallina

Scientific classification
- Domain: Eukaryota
- Kingdom: Fungi
- Division: Ascomycota
- Class: Lecanoromycetes
- Order: Teloschistales
- Family: Teloschistaceae
- Genus: Erichansenia; S.Y.Kondr., Kärnefelt & A.Thell (2020)

Type species
- Erichansenia epithallina (Lynge) S.Y.Kondr., Kärnefelt & A.Thell (2020)

Species
- E. cryodesertorum E. epithallina E. sauronii

= Erichansenia =

Genus of lichens

Erichansenia is a genus of lichen-forming fungi in the family Teloschistaceae. It has three species of saxicolous (rock-dwelling), crustose lichens.

== Taxonomy ==
The genus was circumscribed in 2020 by lichenologists Sergey Kondratyuk, Ingvar Kärnefelt, and Arne Thell, with Erichansenia epithallina assigned as the type species. This lichen was first described as a member of the genus Caloplaca by Bernt Arne Lynge in 1940. The genus name honours Danish lichenologist Eric Steen Hansen.

Erichansenia belongs to the subfamily Xanthorioideae of the family Teloschistaceae. Erichansenia lichens are recognised for their unique combination of features, including the presence of Lecidea green pigment in the cortex and exciple, as well as their distribution spanning both the Northern and Southern Hemispheres. While they share some similarities with other lichen genera such as Shackletonia, Huea, Pyrenodesmia, and Blastenia, their distinct characteristics, chemosyndrome, and microhabitat preferences set them apart within the Teloschistaceae.

== Description ==
Erichansenia lichens are crustose and typically grow on siliceous rocks, particularly large granite rocks, in crevices and cracks. Their thallus, the vegetative body of the lichen, is usually continuous but may be reduced to tiny fragments surrounding apothecia (the reproductive structures). The thallus surface is characterized by deep cracks and is grey to dirty greyish in colour, sometimes appearing blackish within the cracks. The cortex, the outermost layer of the thallus, has a paraplectenchymatous tissue structure.

The apothecia of Erichansenia lichens are lecideine in nature, meaning they have a disc-like structure. In most species, these apothecia are completely black, though young apothecia in Erichansenia sauronii may have dark reddish-orange discs. The outer exciple of Erichansenia apothecia is dark greenish blue. The hymenium, the layer containing spores, is hyaline to faintly blue. The epithecium, situated above the hymenium, ranges from dark greenish blue to blackish with dispersed deep-orange anthraquinone granules. The paraphyses, which are filament-like structures found among the spore-bearing asci, are simple or sparingly branched and may have blue-tinged cell walls. The asci are clavate and of the Teloschistes type, typically holding eight spores. Ascospores are ellipsoid and polaridiblastic.

The cortical layer of Erichansenia thalli reacts negatively to various chemical spot tests, including K−, C−, and KC−. In contrast, their epithecium shows a positive reaction to K with a faint violet colour. The medulla may appear either I+ (violet) or I−, while the outer part of the exciple reacts positively to I/KI+ and has a violet hue. Additionally, Erichansenia lichens display a strong pinkish cN+ reaction, specifically termed "Lecidea green" following the classification proposed by Clifford Wetmore. Erichansenia species produce the lichen products 5-chloroemodin, 7-chloroemodin and their derivatives; this is a unique set of similar substances (a chemosyndrome) that is unique in the subfamily Xanthorioideae.

== Habitat and distribution ==
Erichansenia species are found in diverse ecological niches, including epilithic habitats on naked granite rocks, cracks, and small crevices. They may also exhibit lichenicolous tendencies, growing on various crusts and, rarely, foliose lichens. These lichens have been recorded at altitudes ranging from 300 to 2,900 m (980 to 9,510 ft) above sea level. Collectively, Erichansenia lichens are distributed across the globe, with species such as E. cryodesertorum and E. sauronii known from continental Antarctica, and E. epithallina occurring in the Northern Hemisphere.

== Species ==
- Erichansenia cryodesertorum (Garrido-Ben., Søchting & Pérez-Ort.) S.Y.Kondr., Kärnefelt & A.Thell (2020)
- Erichansenia epithallina (Lynge) S.Y.Kondr., Kärnefelt & A.Thell (2020)
- Erichansenia sauronii (Søchting & Øvstedal) S.Y.Kondr., Kärnefelt & A.Thell (2020)
