= Erichansenia sauronii =

Scientific classification
- Kingdom: Fungi
- Division: Ascomycota
- Class: Lecanoromycetes
- Order: Teloschistales
- Family: Teloschistaceae
- Genus: Erichansenia
- Species: E. sauronii

Binomial name
- Erichansenia sauronii (Søchting & Øvstedal) S.Y.Kondr., Kärnefelt & A.Thell (2020)
- Holotype: Mount Reina Sofía, South Shetland Islands

Synonyms
- Caloplaca sauronii Søchting & Øvstedal (2004); Shackletonia sauronii (Søchting & Øvstedal) Søchting, Frödén & Arup (2013)

Species of lichen

Erichansenia sauronii is a species of crustose lichen in the family Teloschistaceae. First scientifically described in 2004, it was named after Sauron from J. R. R. Tolkien's The Lord of the Rings in reference to its parasitic lifestyle and dark, sometimes anthraquinone-coloured fruiting bodies. The lichen is lichenicolous, meaning it grows on top of other lichens rather than directly on rock or bark, most commonly parasitizing Buellia anisomera in Antarctic environments. It forms thin, crust-like colonies that turn the host's surface units whitish while producing abundant, densely packed black-rimmed fruiting bodies with initially reddish-orange discs that darken with age.

== Taxonomy ==
The species was first scientifically described in 2004 by the lichenologists Ulrik Søchting and Dag Olav Øvstedal. They initially classified it in the genus Caloplaca. Søchting collected the type specimen from the lower slopes of Mount Reina Sofía on 20 January 1998. The specific epithet sauronii pays tribute to Sauron, the chief antagonist in J. R. R. Tolkien's work The Lord of the Rings. The authors chose the name to reflect the lichen's parasitic lifestyle and the sombre, black apothecia—sometimes suffused with an anthraquinone glow—that evoked in their minds Sauron's dark legions. The taxon was transferred to the genus Shackletonia in 2013 following a molecular phylogenetics-led reorganization of the Teloschistaceae. It was most recently reclassified into Erichansenia in 2020.

== Description ==
The lichen body (thallus) forms a thin, crust-like (crustose) layer that is firmly attached to its substrate. It spreads effusively over several centimetres, but instead of colonising bare rock or bark it grows lichenicolously—that is, on top of another lichen, most often Buellia anisomera. As it invades, it turns the host's mosaic-like surface units (areoles) an opaque whitish colour, occasionally tinged pink or orange, while a narrow, dark hypothallus (border) fringes the colony. The fruiting bodies (apothecia) are abundant and densely packed. Each one is up to 0.6 mm across, with a thick (to 0.08 mm), slightly wavy black rim that stands proud of the surface—a form termed lecideine. The disc inside this rim is initially concave and a vivid reddish-orange, owing to anthraquinone pigments, but exposure and age soon darken it until it looks entirely black. On very old thalli, neighbouring apothecia fuse into an irregular, congested mass.

Under the microscope no algal cells appear in the outer apothecial wall (the amphithecium). The inner wall (proper exciple) is brown-black, yet its interior turns an unusual emerald-green and does not react to potassium hydroxide solution (K−). The supporting tissue below the disc (hypothecium) is brown and dotted with oil drops, while the spore-bearing layer (hymenium) is 75–80 micrometres (μm) tall and sprinkled with coarse epipsamma—loose granular pigment. Slender, only sparingly branched paraphyses weave through the hymenium; their tips are scarcely swollen and carry either crystalline anthraquinone deposits or diffuse emerald pigment, both K−. Each sac-like ascus contains eight ascospores. These spores are ellipsoid, sometimes slightly swollen around the cross-wall (septum), and measure 12.5–14.5 × 6–8 μm; the septum is often thin, but where fully developed it is 2.5–3 μm thick. Chemical analysis places Erichansenia sauronii in Søchting's chemosyndrome C_{1}: its medulla is iodine-negative (I−) and it produces several chlorinated anthraquinones, with 7-chloro-emodin as the dominant compound alongside minor amounts of 7-chloro-emodinal, emodinal, 7-chlorocitreorosein, 7-chloro-emodic acid, and emodin.
