= Corticifraga nephromatis =

Scientific classification
- Domain: Eukaryota
- Kingdom: Fungi
- Division: Ascomycota
- Class: Lecanoromycetes
- Order: Graphidales
- Family: Gomphillaceae
- Genus: Corticifraga
- Species: C. nephromatis

Binomial name
- Corticifraga nephromatis Pérez-Ort. (2020)

Species of lichen

Corticifraga nephromatis is a species of lichenicolous (lichen-dwelling) fungus in the family Gomphillaceae. Found in Alaska, it was described as a new species by Sergio Pérez-Ortega. The type was found in the Hoonah–Angoon Census Area in the east arm of the Glacier Bay Basin, where it was growing on the thallus of the foliose lichen Nephroma bellum. The specific epithet refers to the host lichen.

The fungus can be distinguished from similar species by its ascospores: they lack septa and have an ellipsoid shape with teardrop-shaped or acute ends. Corticifraga nephromatis is one of six species of Corticifraga known to occur in Alaska.

== Description ==
Corticifraga nephromatis is a parasitic fungus that lives exclusively on the lichen Nephroma bellum. It reveals itself as scattered, pin-head-sized fruit bodies (apothecia) that push through splits in the host's cortex. Each apothecium is irregularly rounded to angular and only 0.10–0.25 mm wide; its cream-colored disc generally sits flush with the surrounding thallus, and the thin outer rim (exciple) is even paler. The underlying host surface is otherwise undisturbed, so infected patches are easy to overlook without magnification.

Microscopic examination shows a clear hymenium (the fertile spore-bearing tissue) 50–70 micrometres (μm) tall filled with straight, unbranched paraphyses that expand gradually from about 2 μm in the middle to 5 μm at the tips. Below lies a similarly clear hypothecium, sometimes reaching 85 μm in height. The asci are two-walled (bitunicate), narrowly club-shaped (clavate), and eight-spored, measuring 25–34 × 5–8 μm; they lack the iodine staining reactions that many lichen fungi display. The diagnostic feature is the ascospore: colorless, smooth, and single-celled, shaped like a narrow ellipse that tapers to pointed or teardrop ends (10–12 × 3–4 μm). The absence of internal cross-walls (septa) sets these spores apart from those of similar Corticifraga species, making spore shape and septation the most reliable characters for separating C. nephromatis in mixed infections.
