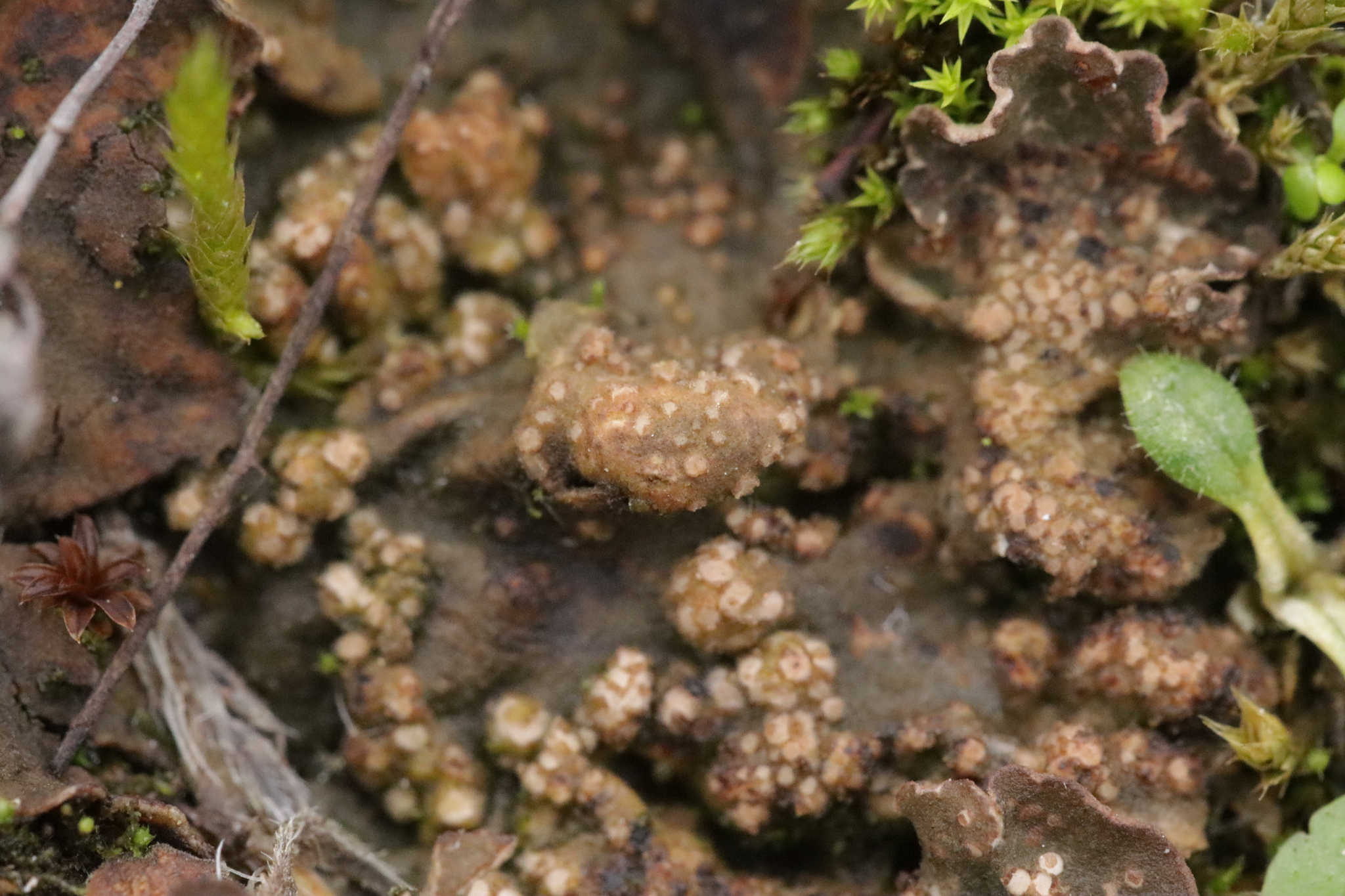
- Corticifraga fuckelii

Scientific classification
- Kingdom: Fungi
- Division: Ascomycota
- Class: Lecanoromycetes
- Order: Graphidales
- Family: Gomphillaceae
- Genus: Corticifraga; D.Hawksw. & R.Sant. (1990)

Type species
- Corticifraga peltigerae (Fuckel) D.Hawksw. & R.Sant. (1990)

Species
- See text

= Corticifraga =

Genus of fungi

Corticifraga is a genus of lichenicolous (lichen-dwelling) fungi in the family Gomphillaceae. The genus was established in 1990 and contains ten species that live as parasites on foliose lichens, mostly targeting species in the family Peltigeraceae. The produce no independent body (thallus) of their own, instead growing beneath the host's outer cortex and eventually producing small, dark fruiting bodies that break through the surface.

== Taxonomy ==
The genus was circumscribed by David Leslie Hawksworth and Rolf Santesson in 1990, with Corticifraga peltigerae assigned as the type species.

== Description ==
Corticifraga is a genus of lichen-dwelling (lichenicolous) fungi; because it lives entirely on its host, it forms no independent thallus (the body seen in most lichens). The fungus grows beneath the cortex of a lichen in the family Peltigeraceae and eventually produces minute, brown to black fruiting structures that break through the host surface. These structures start as tiny, globe- to lens-shaped bodies but mature into shallow, plate-like discs that resemble ordinary lichen apothecia.

The wall (exciple) around each disc is well developed in young specimens but erodes with age so that it barely rises above the spore-bearing surface. Internally, the cavity is lined with slender, mostly unbranched threads (paraphyses); their tips may become club-shaped and pigmented, giving the disc a darker rim. The sac-like spore containers (asci) are elongated, eight-spored and fissitunicate—that is, they release their ascospores by splitting open an inner wall that briefly protrudes like a tube. Each ascus apex is strongly thickened but does not stain with iodine. The colourless spores are smooth, broadly spindle- to ellipsoid-shaped and divided by none, one or up to three cross-walls; a distinct outer coating (perispore) is lacking.

Asexual reproduction has not been documented in Corticifraga, and no separate conidial stage is known. Of all of the currently recognised species, all but C. ramalinae infect foliose (leafy) tripartite lichens in the Peltigeraceae.

== Species ==
As of July 2025, Species Fungorum (in the Catalogue of Life) accept ten species of Corticifraga:

- Corticifraga chugachiana Zhurb. (2007) – Holarctic
- Corticifraga fuckelii (Rehm) D.Hawksw. & R.Sant. (1990)
- Corticifraga fusispora Zhurb. (2009)
- Corticifraga microspora Etayo & Flakus (2019)
- Corticifraga nephromatis Pérez-Ort. (2020) – Alaska
- Corticifraga peltigerae (Fuckel) D.Hawksw. & R.Sant. (1990)
- Corticifraga pseudocyphellariae Etayo (2008)
- Corticifraga ramalinae Pinault, Ertz & Cl.Roux (2022)
- Corticifraga santessonii Zhurb. & Zavarzin (2007) – Holarctic
- Corticifraga scrobiculatae Pérez-Ort. (2010) – Alaska
