= Cercidospora macrospora =

Scientific classification
- Kingdom: Fungi
- Division: Ascomycota
- Class: Dothideomycetes
- Order: Dothideales
- Family: incertae sedis
- Genus: Cercidospora
- Species: C. macrospora

Binomial name
- Cercidospora macrospora (Uloth) Hafellner & Nav.-Ros. (2004)

Synonyms
- Cercidospora ulothii Körb.; Didymella ulothii (Körb.) Berl. & Voglino; Didymella ulothii var. apiosporoides Vouaux; Didymosphaeria ulothii (Körb.) Winter; Phacopsis macrospora Uloth

Species of fungus

Cercidospora macrospora is a species of lichenicolous fungus in the genus Cercidospora but it has not been assigned to a family. It is known from the northern hemisphere.

Known host species include lichen of the genus Lecanora. A few difference Lecanora species are reported hosts to Cercidospora macrospora:

- Lecanora bolcana
- Lecanora dubyi
- Lecanora garovaglii
- Lecanora phaedrophthalma var. christoi
- Lecanora saxicola
- Lecanora versicolor
- Rhizoplaca novomexicana (formerly classified as Lecanora novomexicana)
