= Shackletonia =

Scientific classification
- Domain: Eukaryota
- Kingdom: Fungi
- Division: Ascomycota
- Class: Lecanoromycetes
- Order: Teloschistales
- Family: Teloschistaceae
- Genus: Shackletonia; Søchting, Frödén & Arup, 2013

Type species
- Shackletonia hertelii

Genus of lichen

Shackletonia is a genus of lichen-forming fungi in the family Teloschistaceae. The species in the Shackletonia genus are lichenicolous and muscicolous, and known from Antarctica and southern Patagonia (Arup et al. 2013).

The genus was circumscribed by Ulrik Søchting, Patrik Frödén and Ulf Arup in Nordic J. Bot. vol.31 (1) on page 55 in 2013.

The genus name of Shackletonia is in honour of Sir Ernest Henry Shackleton (1874–1922), an Anglo-Irish Antarctic explorer who led three British expeditions to the Antarctic.

According to phylogenetic analysis, the genera Erichansenia and Shackletonia are positioned on the outermost position to the other genera of the Xanthorioideae subfamily, similarly as in phylogenetic trees published by Arup et al. (2013), Søchting et al. (2014b), and Garrido-Benavent et al. (2016). The genus Shackletonia is distinguished from other Xanthorioideae groups by its unique chemistry, producing 5- and 7-chloroemodin and their derivatives.

Shackletonia hertelii and Shackletonia siphonospora have been found in the Falkland Islands.

They are a nutrient source of Amphipoda in the Antarctica.

== Species ==
As accepted by Species Fungorum;

- Shackletonia buelliae (Olech & Søchting) Søchting, Frödén & Arup (2013)
- Shackletonia hertelii (Søchting, Øvstedal & Sancho) Søchting, Frödén & Arup (2013)
- Shackletonia insignis (Søchting & Øvstedal) Søchting, Frödén & Arup (2013) - Livingston Island
- Shackletonia siphonospora (Olech & Søchting) Søchting, Frödén & Arup (2013)

In September 2022, a new species of lichen was found on James Ross Island (in the Antarctic Peninsula), Shackletonia backorii.

Former species;

- S. cryodesertorum Garrido-Ben., Søchting & Pérez-Ort. (2016) = Erichansenia cryodesertorum
- S. sauronii (Søchting & Øvstedal) Søchting, Frödén & Arup (2013) = Erichansenia sauronii
