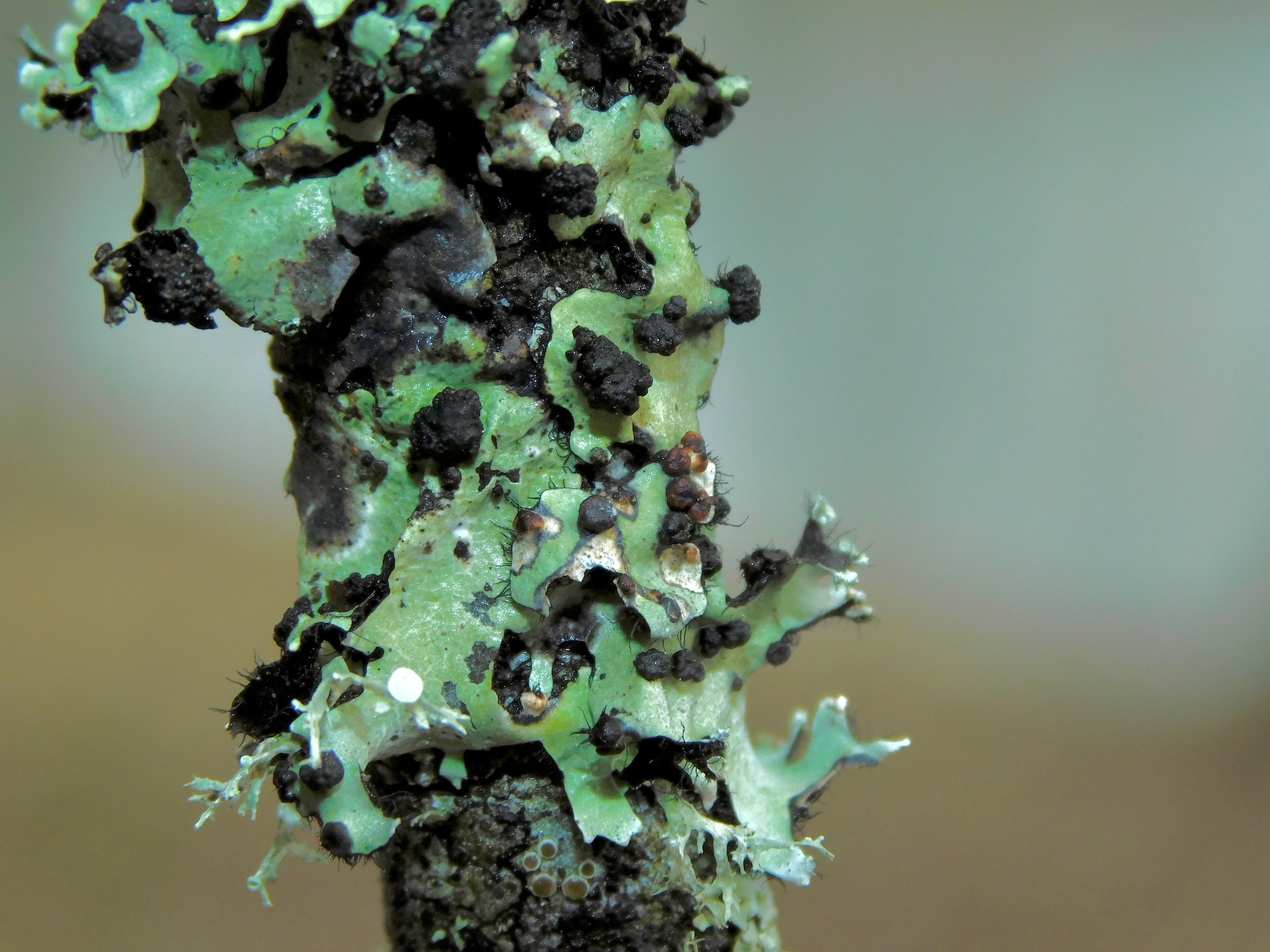
- Black Tremella parmeliarum galls are evident on the host lichen, Parmotrema reticulatum

Scientific classification
- Kingdom: Fungi
- Division: Basidiomycota
- Class: Tremellomycetes
- Order: Tremellales
- Family: Tremellaceae
- Genus: Tremella
- Species: T. parmeliarum

Binomial name
- Tremella parmeliarum Diederich (1996)

= Tremella parmeliarum =

Species of lichen

Tremella parmeliarum is a species of lichenicolous (lichen-dwelling) fungus in the family Tremellaceae. Its host is the foliose lichen species Parmotrema reticulatum.

== Taxonomy ==
The fungus was formally described as a new species in 1996 by the Luxembourger mycologist Paul Diederich. The type specimen was collected in Papua New Guinea, specifically in the Madang Province's Huon Peninsula, within the Finisterre Range, Yupna Valley, near Teptep village. The specimen was found growing on Rimelia reticulata and was collected on 30 July 1992 by Diederich, who designated it as the holotype. Since then, the fungus has been reported from several host lichens in the family Parmulariaceae, and was then considered a species complex. Many of these taxa formerly thought to be T. parmeliarum are now considered as independent species that are host-specific. The specific host for Tremella parmeliarum is Parmotrema reticulatum. Close relatives of T. parmeliarum—all of which are lichenicolous—include T. flavoparmeliae, T. puncteliae, T. parmohypotropi, and T. puncteliotegens.

== Description ==
The basidiomata (fruiting bodies) of Tremella parmeliarum are lichenicolous, growing on the thalli of species in the genus Parmotrema. They manifest as superficial, brownish galls that are typically convex, with constricted bases and often lobed or tuberculate features, ranging from 0.4 to 4 mm in diameter. The structure lacks hyphidia. The basidia are 2–4 celled, with longitudinal, oblique, or transverse septa (internal partitions), measuring 12–23 by 5–15 μm. The basidiospores are 5–8 by 4–7 μm. Mature asteroconidia are also present.

== Distribution ==
Tremella parmeliarum has a broad distribution, occurring across various regions. It has been found in Europe, including Ireland and Portugal, and in Macaronesia, with records from the Azores, Canary Islands, and Madeira. In North America, it is present in Mexico and the US, specifically in Alabama, Arkansas, and Virginia. The fungus is also found in Central America, particularly in Panama, and in the Caribbean, including the Dominican Republic. In South America, it has been reported in Bolivia, Brazil, Chile, and Ecuador. Its distribution extends to the Indian Ocean, with a presence in Madagascar, and it is found in Asia, including India and Nepal. Additionally, Tremella parmeliarum occurs in Oceania, including Australia and Papua New Guinea.
