= Cercidospora soror =

Scientific classification
- Kingdom: Fungi
- Division: Ascomycota
- Class: Dothideomycetes
- Order: Dothideales
- Genus: Cercidospora
- Species: C. soror

Binomial name
- Cercidospora soror Obermayer & Triebel (1995)

Species of fungus

Cercidospora soror is a species of lichenicolous fungus in the genus Cercidospora but it has not been assigned to a family. It was discovered growing on Arthrorhaphis citrinella in Austria but has since then also been reported from Greenland, where it infects Arthrorhaphis alpina and Arthrorhaphis citrinella.

== Taxonomy ==
Cercidospora soror was first described as a new species in 1995 by Walter Obermayer and Dagmar Triebel. The species was discovered during extensive studies of the genus Arthrorhaphis conducted by Obermayer. The holotype specimen (the definitive reference specimen) of C. soror was collected on 28 September 1990, by Helmut Mayrhofer at Hauseck, near Großer Bösenstein in Styria, Austria, at an elevation of about 1,950 metres. This specimen is preserved in the herbarium of Karl-Franzens-Universität Graz (GZU), with an isotype deposited at Uppsala University (UPS). The specific epithet soror is Latin for 'sister', chosen because this species so closely resembles its "brother" species Cercidospora trypetheliza that grows on the same hosts. The two species can only be distinguished through careful microscopic examination of their fruiting bodies.

The generic name Cercidospora was established by Gustav Wilhelm Körber in 1865 and later emended (taxonomically modified) by Josef Hafellner in 1987. The genus belongs to the Ascomycota (sac fungi) and comprises exclusively lichenicolous species, meaning fungi that grow on lichens. Only one species in the genus, C. decolorella, is potentially algae-dwelling (algicol) rather than lichen-dwelling.

Within Cercidospora, there are two notable evolutionary trends: a reduction in the number of spores per ascus (spore sac) and the development of species with multiply-septate spores that have parallel cross-walls. Cercidospora soror exemplifies the first trend with its four-spored asci, reduced from the typical eight spores found in many related species.

== Description ==
Cercidospora soror forms small, black, perithecium-like fruiting bodies (pseudothecia) that are mostly embedded within the yellow thallus (body) of its host lichens in the genus Arthrorhaphis. These fruiting bodies are barely visible to the naked eye, measuring only 100–140 micrometre (μm) in diameter. The apical part (upper section) of each fruiting body appears greenish-black due to pigmentation, while the lower portions remain colourless.

When mature, the fruiting bodies develop a distinct opening (ostiole) anout 25 μm wide. Inside, the fungus produces cylindrical asci (spore-containing structures) measuring 50–65 μm long by 10–12 μm wide. Each ascus typically contains four colourless, elongated spores with three septa (cross-walls), though occasionally only two spores develop. The spores measure 16–22 μm long by 5–6 μm wide and are initially surrounded by a clear gelatinous sheath (perispore).

Cercidospora soror differs from its close relative C. trypetheliza in having four-spored asci (rather than eight) and three-septate spores (rather than two-septate). It can be distinguished from other related species like C. lichenicola by its three-septate spores and four-spored asci, and from C. stereocaulorum by its smaller spores. C. soror appears to inhibit the formation of soredia (vegetative reproductive structures) in its host lichens, preferring to grow on compact, non-sorediate sections of the lichen thallus.
