= Cercidospora thamnoliicola =

Scientific classification
- Kingdom: Fungi
- Division: Ascomycota
- Class: Dothideomycetes
- Order: Dothideales
- Genus: Cercidospora
- Species: C. thamnoliicola

Binomial name
- Cercidospora thamnoliicola Ihlen (1995)

Species of fungus

Cercidospora thamnoliicola is a species of lichenicolous (lichen-dwelling) fungus in the genus Cercidospora but it has not been assigned to a family. Originally described from Norwegian specimens, the fungus is known to parasitise the lichen Thamnolia vermicularis in Iceland but it is rare there.

== Taxonomy ==
The species was first formally described by the mycologist Per G. Ihlen in 1995, from specimens found growing on Thamnolia vermicularis in Norway. The specific epithet thamnoliicola is derived from the name of its host lichen genus Thamnolia and the Latin suffix "-cola" meaning "dweller" or "inhabitant", alluding to its ecological relationship with Thamnolia.

== Description ==
Cercidospora thamnoliicola is a lichenicolous fungus species, meaning it grows specifically on lichens rather than independently. Its reproductive structures (ascomata) are small, spherical chambers (perithecia) measuring 95–120 μm in diameter. These structures are largely embedded within the host lichen tissue, with only the small opening (ostiole), about 5 μm in diameter, visible at the surface.

The wall of the ascomata varies in structure and colour. In the lower portion, it ranges from light brown to colourless (hyaline), measuring 11–17 micrometre (μm) thick, and lacks clear definition where it meets the host tissue. The upper portion displays brown to dark brown pigmentation, is slightly thicker at 12–18 μm, with the pigments confined to the cell walls.

Inside the ascomata, the hamathecium (sterile tissue among reproductive cells) consists of sparse, minimally branched thread-like structures (paraphysoids) measuring 1–2 μm in thickness, particularly evident in the lower sections. The fungus produces broadly somewhat cylindrical spore sacs (asci) that lack stalks and measure 37–41 by 6–8 (rarely up to 12) μm. These asci show no colour change when stained with iodine (no amyloid reaction) and typically contain four spores (occasionally six).

The spores (ascospores) are arranged in two approximate rows within the asci. They are ellipsoid to narrowly ellipsoid with rounded ends, with the upper cells being wider than the lower cells. The spores are colourless, divided by three cross-walls (3-septate), surrounded by a gel-like sheath (halonate), smooth-surfaced, and measure 1l–14 (sometimes up to 16) by 4–6 μm.
