= Cercidospora =

Scientific classification
- Kingdom: Fungi
- Division: Ascomycota
- Class: Dothideomycetes
- Order: Dothideales
- Genus: Cercidospora; Körb.

Type species
- Cercidospora ulothii Körb.

Genus of fungi

Cercidospora is a genus of fungi in the class Dothideomycetes. The relationship of this taxon to other taxa within the class is unknown (incertae sedis). The genus was first described by Gustav Wilhelm Körber in 1865; it is synonymous with the name Prolisea described by Frederick Edward Clements in 1931.

== Species ==
The genus contains 35 accepted species:

- Cercidospora alpina Ihlen & Wedin
- Cercidospora anomala Etayo
- Cercidospora arthroraphidicola Alstrup
- Cercidospora barrenoana Calat. & Nav.-Ros.
- Cercidospora cecidiiformans Grube & Hafellner
- Cercidospora cladoniicola Alstrup
- Cercidospora crozalsiana (H.Olivier) Nav.-Ros., Cl.Roux & Casares
- Cercidospora decolorella (Nyl.) O.E.Erikss. & J.Z.Yue
- Cercidospora epicarphinea (Nyl.) Grube & Hafellner
- Cercidospora epipolytropa (Mudd) Arnold
- Cercidospora epithamnolia Zhurb.
- Cercidospora galligena Hafellner & Nav.-Ros.
- Cercidospora harknessii Kuntze
- Cercidospora hypotrachynicola Etayo
- Cercidospora lecidomae Zhurb. & Triebel
- Cercidospora lobothalliae Nav.-Ros. & Calat.
- Cercidospora macrospora (Uloth) Hafellner & Nav.-Ros.
- Cercidospora melanophthalmae Nav.-Ros., Calat. & Hafellner
- Cercidospora ochrolechiae Zhurb.
- Cercidospora parva Hafellner & Ihlen
- Cercidospora punctilla (Nyl.) R.Sant.
- Cercidospora punctillata (Nyl.) R.Sant.
- Cercidospora rinodinae Etayo & van den Boom
- Cercidospora santessonii Motiej., Zhurb., Suija & Kantvilas
- Cercidospora solearispora Calat., Nav.-Ros. & Hafellner
- Cercidospora soror Obermayer & Triebel
- Cercidospora stenotropae Nav.-Ros. & Hafellner
- Cercidospora stereocaulorum (Arnold) Hafellner
- Cercidospora thamnogalloides Zhurb.
- Cercidospora thamnoliae Zhurb.
- Cercidospora thamnoliicola Ihlen
- Cercidospora trypetheliza (Nyl.) Hafellner & Obermayer
- Cercidospora verrucosaria (Linds.) Arnold
- Cercidospora werneri Nav.-Ros., Calat. & Hafellner
- Cercidospora xanthoriae (Wedd.) R.Sant.

== See also ==
- List of Dothideomycetes genera incertae sedis
