= Cercidospora epipolytropa =

Scientific classification
- Kingdom: Fungi
- Division: Ascomycota
- Class: Dothideomycetes
- Order: Dothideales
- Genus: Cercidospora
- Species: C. epipolytropa

Binomial name
- Cercidospora epipolytropa (Mudd) Arnold (1874)

Synonyms
- List: Arthopyrenia epipolytropa (Mudd) H.Olivier (1906); Cercidospora epipolytropa Mudd (1861); Didymella epipolytropa (Mudd) Berl. & Voglino (1886); Didymella epipolytropa var. apiosporoides Vouaux (1909); Didymosphaeria epipolytropa (Mudd) G.Winter (1885); Pharcidia epipolytropa (Mudd) Arnold (1870); Pharcidia epipolytropon (Mudd) Jacz. (1896); Thelidium epipolytropum Mudd (1861); Verrucaria epipolytropa (Mudd) Cromb. (1870)

Species of fungus

Cercidospora epipolytropa is a species of lichenicolous fungus in the genus Cercidospora but it has not been assigned to a family. It is known to parasitise the crustose lichen Lecanora polytropa. The fungus was first formally described by mycologist William Mudd in 1861. Ferdinand Christian Gustav Arnold transferred it to Cercidospora in 1874.
