= Corticifraga peltigerae =

Scientific classification
- Kingdom: Fungi
- Division: Ascomycota
- Class: Lecanoromycetes
- Order: Graphidales
- Family: Gomphillaceae
- Genus: Corticifraga
- Species: C. peltigerae

Binomial name
- Corticifraga peltigerae (Fuckel) D.Hawksw. & R.Sant. (1990)

Synonyms
- Peziza peltigerae Fuckel (1867); Melaspilea peltigerae Nyl. (1868); Celidium peltigerae (Nyl.) P.Karst. (1887); Phragmonaevia peltigerae (Nyl.) Rehm (1888); Diplonaevia peltigerae (Nyl.) Sacc. (1889); Leciographa peltigerae (Nyl.) Mussat (1901)

Species of fungus

Corticifraga peltigerae is a species of lichenicolous (lichen-dwelling) fungus in the family Gomphillaceae, and the type species of the genus Corticifraga. Its typical host lichen is Peltigera, although on occasion it is found on Solorina and Pseudocyphellaria.

The fungus was first described in 1867 by the German botanist Karl Wilhelm Gottlieb Leopold Fuckel, who initially classified it in the genus Peziza. It has been transferred to several genera early in its taxonomic history, before ending up in Corticifraga, which was newly circumscribed by David Leslie Hawksworth and Rolf Santesson in 1990 to contain lichenicolous fungi previously referred to Phragmonaevia.
