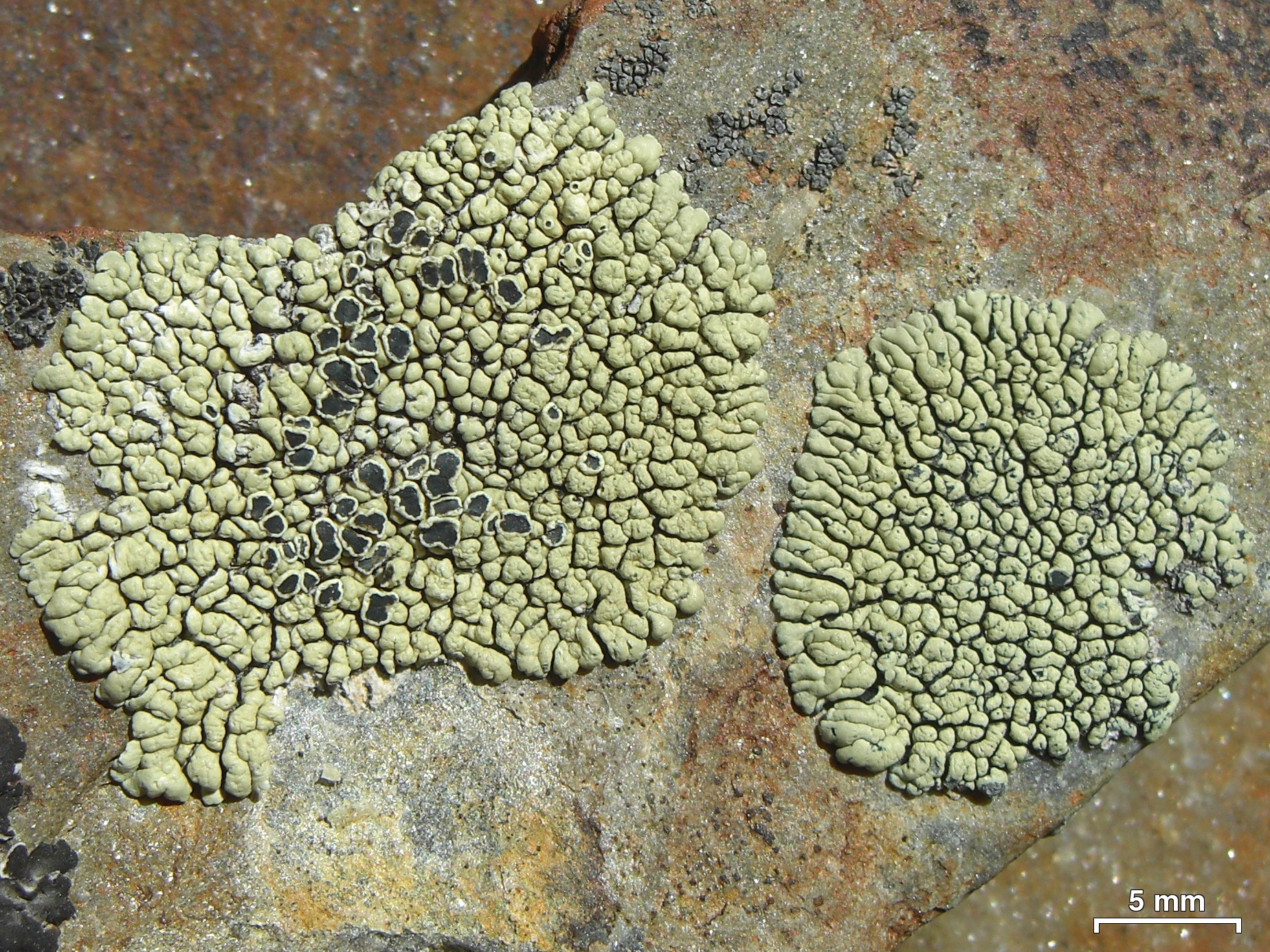

Conservation status
- Apparently Secure (NatureServe)

Scientific classification
- Kingdom: Fungi
- Division: Ascomycota
- Class: Lecanoromycetes
- Order: Lecanorales
- Family: Lecanoraceae
- Genus: Rhizoplaca
- Species: R. novomexicana

Binomial name
- Rhizoplaca novomexicana (H.Magn.) S.D.Leav., Zhao Xin & Lumbsch (2015)

Synonyms
- Lecanora novomexicana H.Magn. (1932); Protoparmeliopsis novomexicana (H.Magn.) S.Y.Kondr. (2012)

= Rhizoplaca novomexicana =

Species of lichen

Rhizoplaca novomexicana is a species of saxicolous (rock-dwelling), crustose lichen in the family Lecanoraceae. Found in North America, the lichen was first formally described as a new species in 1932 by Adolf Hugo Magnusson, as a member of the genus Lecanora. Sergey Kondratyuk proposed a transfer to the genus Protoparmeliopsis in 2012. Steven Leavitt, Xin Zhao, and H. Thorsten Lumbsch transferred it to the genus Rhizoplaca in 2015, when, following molecular phylogenetics analysis, they emended that genus to include three placodioid species previously placed in Lecanora. It is a known host species to the fungus Cercidospora macrospora which typically infects lichen of the genus Lecanora.
