= Lichenicolous fungus =

Parasitic fungus that only lives on lichen

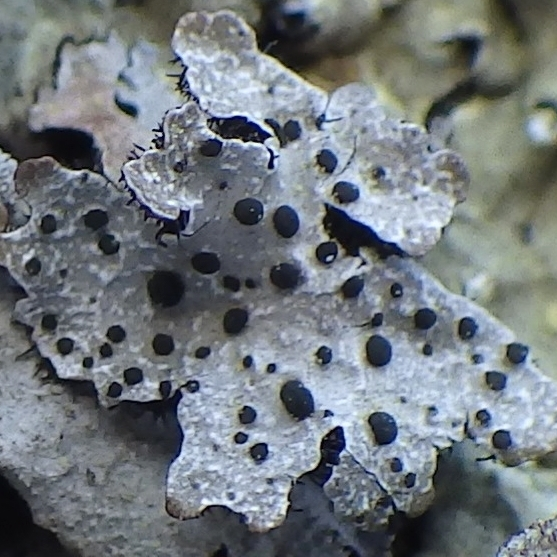
The lichenicolous fungus Abrothallus parmeliarum growing on Parmelia saxatilis

A lichenicolous fungus is a member of a specialised group of fungi that live exclusively on lichens as their host organisms. These fungi, comprising over 2,000 known species across 280 genera, exhibit a wide range of ecological strategies, including parasitism, commensalism, and mutualism. They can be found in diverse environments worldwide, from tropical to polar regions, and play important roles in lichen ecology and biodiversity. Lichenicolous fungi are classified into several taxonomic groups, with the majority belonging to the Ascomycota and a smaller portion to the Basidiomycota. Their interactions with host lichens range from mild parasitism to severe pathogenicity, sometimes causing significant damage to lichen communities.

While the study of lichenicolous fungi dates back to the mid-18th century, recent decades have seen major advancements through modern research methods, including molecular techniques, metagenomics, and sophisticated imaging. These fungi show varying levels of host specificity, with some species restricted to a single lichen genus or species, while others can colonise multiple hosts. A unique subset, known as lichenicolous lichens, initiates its lifecycle as parasites but eventually becomes lichenised through a process called kleptosymbiosis. Various ecological and environmental factors, including altitude, microhabitat availability, and host specificity, influence the diversity and distribution of lichenicolous fungi.

The study of lichenicolous fungi presents unique challenges due to their microscopic size and intimate association with their hosts. Researchers employ various methods, from traditional culture techniques to advanced molecular approaches. Isolating and culturing of these fungi can be difficult, often requiring specialised media and growth conditions. Molecular methods have revolutionised the field, enabling more accurate identification and phylogenetic analysis. Nevertheless, distinguishing foreign hyphae within lichen thalli from the mycobiont proper (the fungal component of the lichen) remains a challenge.

Recent research has broadened our understanding of lichenicolous fungi, particularly within groups such as black fungi and the genus Cladophialophora. These studies have not only revealed new species but also demoinstrated the potential for lichens to serve as refugia for specialised fungal organisms. Advancements in isolation techniques, culturing methods, and molecular analyses have advanced the field. The actual number of lichenicolous fungal species may be much higher than currently described, potentially reaching 3,000–5,000 species.

== Definition and characteristics ==
Lichenicolous fungi are a specialised group of fungi that live exclusively on lichens as their host organisms. The term "lichenicolous" comes from Latin, with "lichen" referring to the host and "cola" meaning "inhabitant". These fungi are distinct from the fungal component of lichens themselves, which are known as lichenised fungi. The study of lichenicolous fungi dates back to the mid-18th century, predating the recognition of lichens as symbiotic organisms.

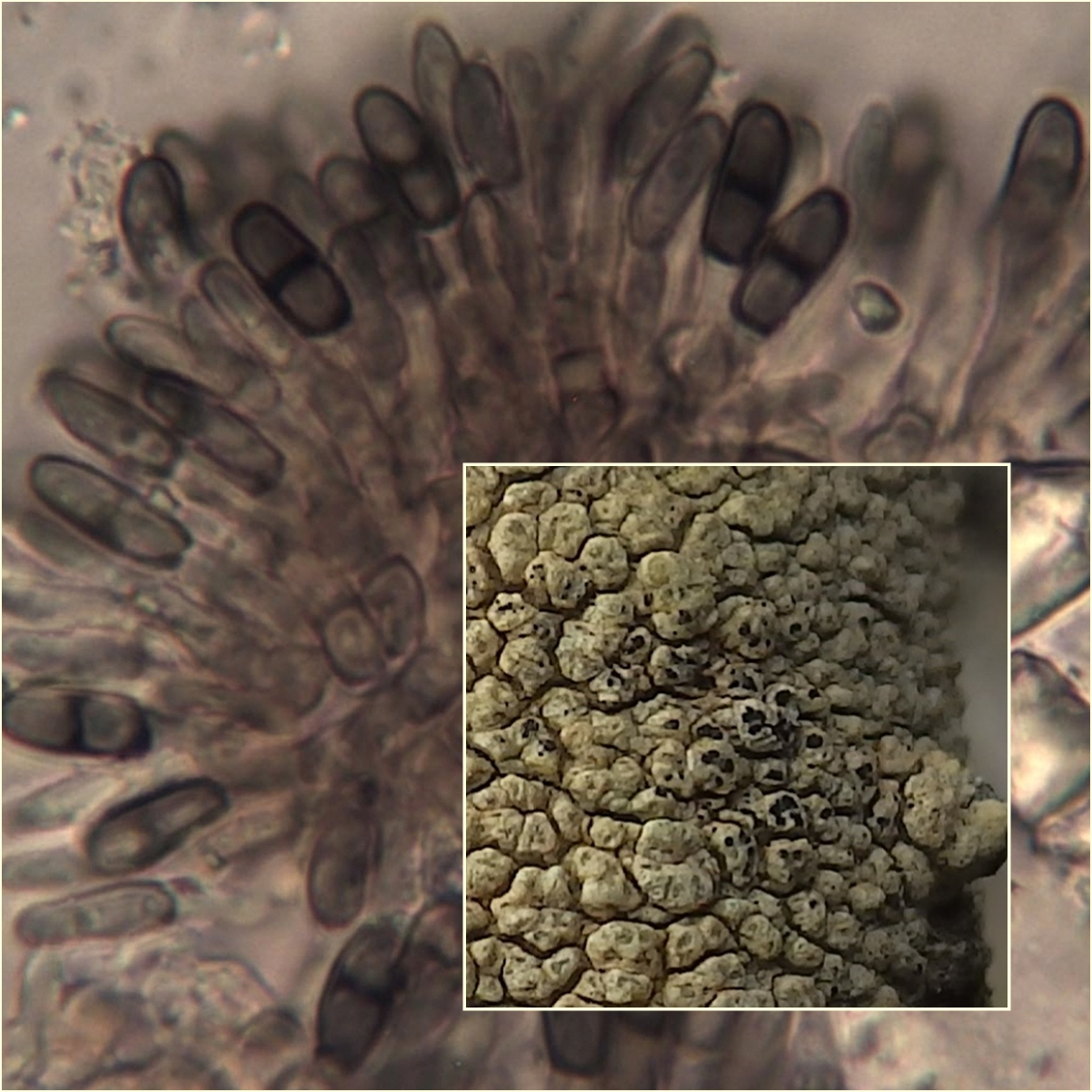
Microscopic view of the radially arranged conidia in a conidiophore from Minutoexcipula, a lichenicolous fungus; the inset shows the fungus (visible as black spots) parasitizing its host, a crustose lichen in genus Pertusaria.

Lichenicolous fungi represent a highly diverse group, with over 2,000 known species across 280 genera, reflecting a wide range of ecological strategies and relationships with their lichen hosts. As of 1981, it was estimated that there might be as many as 300 genera and 1,000 species of lichenicolous fungi. These relationships vary widely, including parasitism, where the fungus harms the lichen; commensalism, where the fungus benefits without affecting the lichen; and mutualism, where both organisms benefit. Lichen thalli provide a complex and varied habitat for lichenicolous fungi, characterised by biological gradients that range from actively growing to decaying parts. This diversity within a single thallus creates a spectrum of microenvironments, which may contribute to the diversification of fungal life strategies. For example, certain lichen-associated fungi specialise in colonising epinecral layers or epicortices, structures lacking living host cells. Others prefer decaying parts of lichens, linking necrotic to saprobic life styles. The presence of these biological gradients within lichen thalli may act as a catalyst for the evolution and adaptation of lichenicolous fungi, potentially explaining the wide range of ecological relationships observed, from commensalism to parasitism. This complexity within the lichen habitat has led some researchers to suggest that lichens may serve as a 'cradle' for fungal evolution, fostering the development of diverse fungal life strategies. Some lichenicolous fungi are pathogenic, while others are saprotrophic, decomposing dead lichen tissues. A few lichenicolous fungi eventually become lichenised themselves, integrating into the lichen structure. Lichenicolous fungi can be non-lichenised or lichenised, obligate or facultative, and may or may not induce symptoms on the host. They are part of the complex microbiome associated with lichens, which includes bacteria, algae, and other fungi.

Lichenicolous basidiomycetes, which make up about 5% of all known lichenicolous fungi as of 2018, include both homobasidiomycetes and heterobasidiomycetes. Homobasidiomycetes typically have basidia (spore-producing structures) that lack septa (internal partitions) and non-gelatinous basidiomata (fruiting bodies), while heterobasidiomycetes have septate basidia and gelatinous basidiomata.

Morphologically, lichenicolous fungi can take diverse forms. They may produce visible fruiting bodies on the surface of the host lichen, or exist as hyphae within the host thallus. Some species can cause gall-like structures or other deformations in their hosts.

By 2018, there were 2,319 accepted species of lichenicolous fungi, including around 1,250 species of lichenicolous ascomycetes in 280 genera, and 62 species of lichenicolous basidiomycetes in ten genera. These can be categorised into three main groups:

Obligately lichenicolous species (2,000 taxa)
Lichenicolous lichens (257 taxa)
Facultatively lichenicolous taxa (62 taxa)

Advancements in molecular techniques and increased exploration have greatly expanded the known diversity of lichenicolous basidiomycetes, nearly doubling the species count since 2018.

== Diversity and classification ==
The known diversity of lichenicolous fungi has increased significantly in recent decades. This growth in known diversity reflects a resurgence of interest in lichenicolous fungi in the late 20th century. For example, Clauzade and Roux compiled 457 species in 1976, which increased to 686 species by 1989. In 1997, there were 894 accepted species of obligately lichenicolous fungi. By 2018, this number had grown to over 1,800, with a rapid rate of discovery, averaging 45 new infrageneric taxa added per year over the past two decades. In total, about 1,170 infrageneric taxa have been added since 1990.

Lichenicolous basidiomycetes, a diverse group within the Basidiomycota, are primarily found in the subdivisions Agaricomycotina and Pucciniomycotina. These subdivisions encompass a wide range of fungal forms, including those that produce complex fruiting bodies and those with simpler, often parasitic forms.

Within the Agaricomycotina, lichenicolous species are present in two classes. In the Agaricomycetes, lichenicolous species are found in five of its eighteen orders: Agaricales, Atheliales, Boletales, Cantharellales, and Corticiales. In the Tremellomycetes, lichenicolous species are found in two of its five orders: Filobasidiales and Tremellales. Within the Pucciniomycotina, lichenicolous species are found in three classes: Agaricostilbomycetes, Cystobasidiomycetes, and Microbotryomycetes.

As of 2018, there were 93 known species of lichenicolous basidiomycetes (plus 7 facultatively lichenicolous taxa). Studies published since then have reported the discovery of many new species and even new genera. By 2022, the number of known species had nearly doubled to almost 200. To put this diversity in context, the estimated 300 genera and 1000 species of lichenicolous fungi (as of 1981) can be compared with the 150 genera and 700 species of Gasteromycetes, or 90 genera and 600 species of Pezizales.

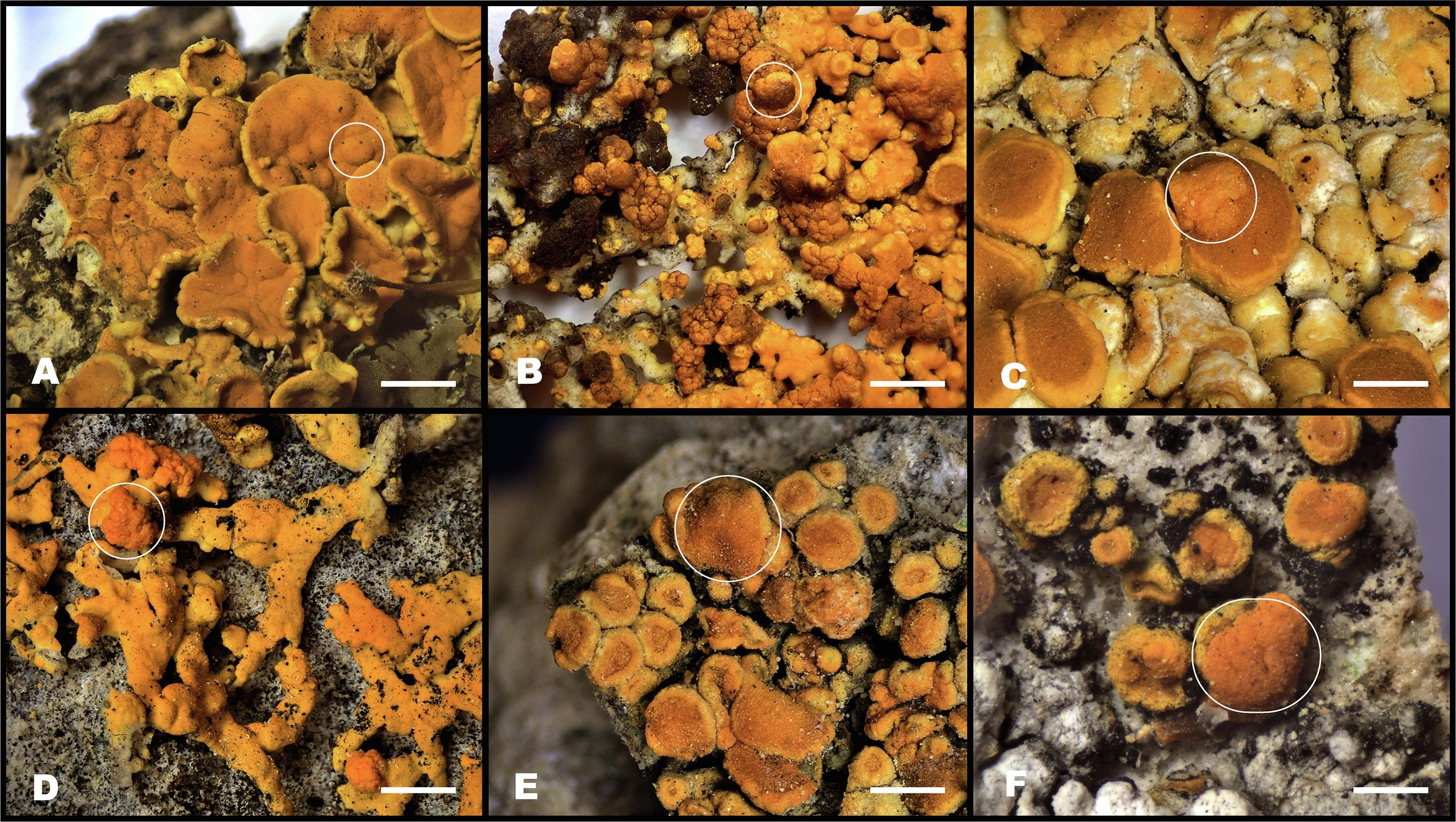
The lichenicolous Tremella caloplacae species complex on Teloschistaceae hosts: (A) on Xanthoria parietina, (B) on Rusavskia elegans, (C) on Variospora flavescens, (D) on Rusavskia sorediata, (E) on Calogaya pusilla, (F) on Xanthocarpia sp.; white circles enclose Tremella-induced galls. Scale bars = 1 mm.

The description of the new genus Crittendenia in the Pucciniomycotina represents a major taxonomic development, as it redefines the classification of several host-specific parasitic species previously placed under Chionosphaera. Another development is the recognition of several species complexes, such as Syzygospora physciacearum and Tremella parmeliarum, which have been split into multiple distinct species, often with high host specificity.

Lichenicolous species are also found among black fungi, a group characterised by dark-coloured mycelia due to melanin in their cell walls. These fungi, known for their ability to colonise extreme habitats including lichen thalli, are represented by the genus Cladophialophora. In 2023, nine new species of Cladophialophora were described from lichens collected in China, exemplifying the ongoing discovery of novel lichenicolous fungi. These species were isolated from the medullary tissues of various lichen hosts, suggesting potential biotrophic or commensal relationships. Cladophialophora is a lineage of lichenicolous fungi, with many species likely awaiting discovery. The findings add to a growing picture of lichenicolous fungal diversity and illustrate how lichens themselves can serve as refugia for these specialised organisms.

A biological analysis of lichenicolous fungi genera reveals distinct trends. A significant proportion of genera with lichenicolous representatives are exclusively lichenicolous, while others include saprophytic or lichen-forming species as well. For instance, among the lichenicolous Hyphomycetes, 43% of genera are confined to lichens, while for lichenicolous Coelomycetes, this figure rises to 75%.

While the number of known lichenicolous basidiomycete species has increased in recent years, it is believed that many more species remain undiscovered. As of 2022, estimates of global diversity suggest that there are over 1000 species of lichenicolous heterobasidiomycetes, more than 60 species of lichenicolous homobasidiomycetes, and more than 30 species of endolichenic homobasidiomycetes. These estimates are based on analyses of host specificity, current knowledge gaps, and the rate of new species discoveries. The actual number of species may be even higher, especially in under-explored regions and taxonomic groups. Some researchers estimate that the total number of lichenicolous fungal species could potentially reach 3,000.

== Taxonomy and nomenclature ==
The taxonomy and nomenclature of lichenicolous fungi have undergone great changes with the adoption of the "one fungus–one name" principle in the International Code of Nomenclature for algae, fungi, and plants (Melbourne Code). This principle has important implications for classifying and naming lichenicolous fungi. Under the new rules, all legitimate fungal names are treated equally for establishing priority, regardless of the life history stage. This change is significant for lichenicolous fungi, as many species were previously described separately in their sexual (teleomorph) and asexual (anamorph) states.

The implementation of this principle has led to several taxonomic changes. When genetically identical teleomorphs and anamorphs have different names, the older name takes priority, unless the younger name is conserved. For species known only in their anamorphic state, if the teleomorph is discovered, the species is described or combined in the appropriate teleomorph genus, even if teleomorph characters are not mentioned. Anamorphic species recognised as undescribed are now placed in teleomorph genera when their phylogenetic placement is known, rather than in separate anamorphic genera.

These changes have reorganised several groups of lichenicolous fungi. For example, the genus Vouauxiomyces, which included anamorphs of Abrothallus species, has been reduced to synonymy with Abrothallus. Several Phoma-like lichenicolous fungi have been found to belong to various lineages within Dothideomycetes and have been reclassified accordingly. For instance, some species previously placed in Phoma are now recognised as members of Didymocyrtis in the Phaeosphaeriaceae.

These taxonomic and nomenclatural changes present challenges but also opportunities for a more accurate and phylogenetically informed classification of lichenicolous fungi. However, caution is needed when describing new genera, as names may already exist in traditional generic synonymy.

== Ecology and host relationships ==
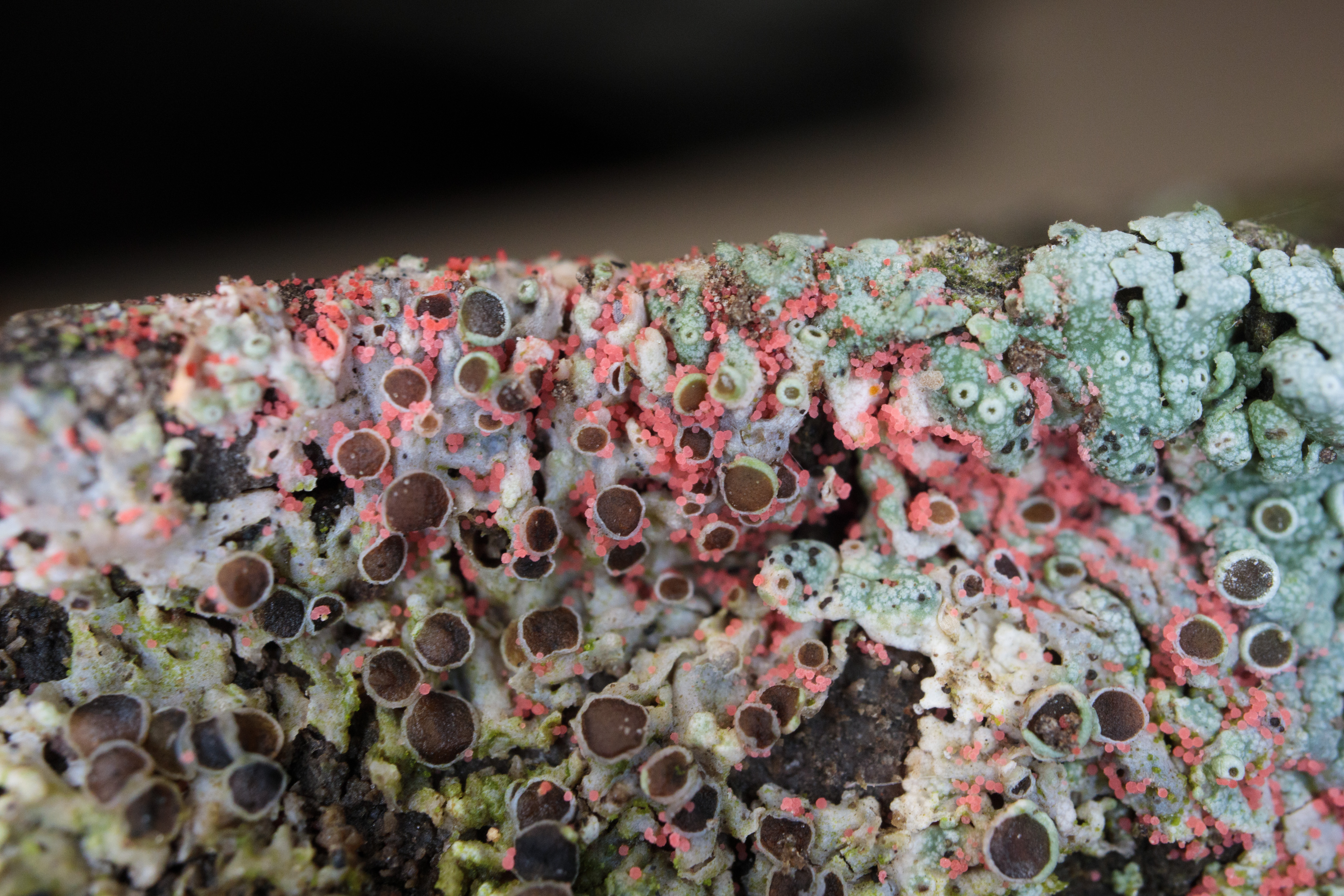
Marchandiomyces corallinus growing on Physcia sp., illustrating a common parasitic relationship

Lichenicolous fungi have a range of ecological relationships with their hosts, from outright parasitism through neutral commensalism to apparently mutualistic partnerships. Which outcome prevails depends on host specificity, environmental conditions and the adaptability of the fungus itself. Many species are assumed to be parasitic or commensalistic, but some may play more constructive roles within the thallus. Certain lichen-associated fungi appear to degrade and recycle senescent parts of the host, potentially redistributing nutrients to actively growing tissue. Others may contribute to the breakdown of dead organic matter in the wider lichen community. How widespread or significant these functions are remains unclear, and the ecological impact of lichenicolous fungi is likely more varied than older accounts of simple parasitism would suggest.

=== Types of ecological relationships ===
Lichenicolous fungi can be broadly categorised into two main types based on their impact on the host:

- Necrotrophic: These fungi have a devastating effect on either the lichen mycobiont (mycoparasites), the photobiont (algal parasites), or both.
- Non-destructive inhabitants: These fungi sporulate abundantly without causing major damage to either the fungal or the photoautotrophic partner of the host thallus. While sometimes referred to as parasymbionts or commensalists, they are best regarded as mild parasites as they still drain nutrients from the thallus.

While many lichenicolous fungi are parasitic, others establish commensalistic or potentially mutualistic relationships. Some species, the lichenicolous lichens, can even develop their own lichenised thalli using the host lichen's photobiont. Certain lichenicolous fungi may play important roles in nutrient cycling within the lichen thallus, potentially benefiting the host by degrading and recycling older parts of the lichen.

=== Host specificity and distribution ===
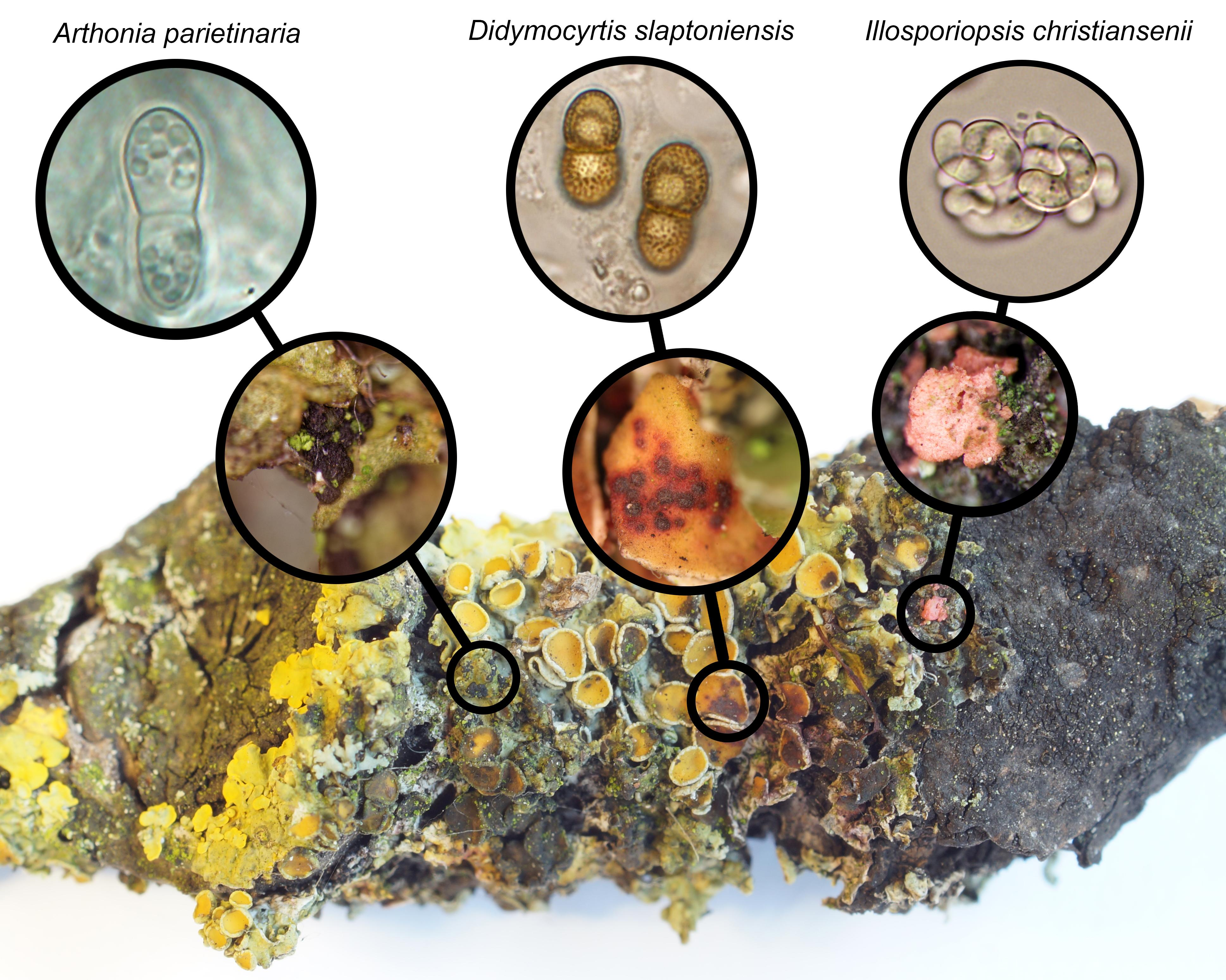
Lichenicolous fungi on Xanthoria parietina: Arthonia parietinaria, Didymocyrtis slaptoniensis, Illosporiopsis christiansenii and the 'sooty' apothecia caused by Xanthoriicola physciae.

Host specificity is a crucial factor in the distribution and ecology of lichenicolous fungi. An estimated 95% of species associate with only a single lichen species or genus, suggesting potential coevolutionary relationships. This high degree of specificity has important evolutionary implications, indicating long-term adaptations between fungi and their lichen hosts. However, the range of host specificity can vary greatly among lichenicolous fungi. While many are highly specific, others can colonise multiple unrelated lichen species.

Host specificity also has evolutionary consequences. A highly specific parasite risks co-extinction if its host declines, whereas a generalist is buffered against the loss of any single host. This may explain why it is unusual for a single genus of lichenicolous fungi to include more than one species that attacks a particular host lichen; when this does occur, the two species typically produce different symptoms, perhaps because they have adopted different ecological strategies. Even within one genus, one species may be parasitic on a given host while another is parasymbiotic on the same host, so that closely related fungi can occupy quite different ecological positions.

Molecular studies suggest that some lichenicolous fungi may have broader host ranges than previously thought based on morphological observations alone. Some species have been found to be present in asymptomatic lichens or even in lichen species not previously known to harbour these fungi.

=== Hyperparasitism ===
Lichenicolous fungi can also be drawn into chains of hyperparasitism. Non-lichenised fungi sometimes parasitise lichenicolous lichens: species such as Stigmidium arthrorhaphidis, Cercidospora trypetheliza, and C. soror infect Arthrorhaphis citrinella, which itself grows parasitically on Baeomyces, Cladonia squamules, or decaying lichens. Still longer chains occur when one lichen is hyperparasitic on a lichenicolous lichen: Rhizocarpon diploschistidina, for instance, parasitises Diploschistes muscorum, which in turn begins its life as a parasite of Cladonia species.

=== Distribution ===
The distribution of lichenicolous fungi is influenced by various ecological and environmental factors. For instance, the Koralpe mountain range in Austria, with its stable conditions and variety of microhabitats, supports a high diversity of both lichens and lichenicolous fungi. The presence of exposed boulders and cliffs provides numerous microniches for these fungi to exploit, ranging from the outer cortex to the inner medulla of lichen thalli.

In alpine and polar regions, the stability and longevity of lichen thalli provide consistent microhabitats, allowing lichenicolous fungi to establish long-term populations. These environmental conditions contribute to the observed patterns of beta diversity – the variation in species composition between different habitats. Research in the Koralpe Mountain area revealed high beta diversity due to numerous microenvironmental conditions supporting various fungal species. Alpha diversity (diversity within subplots) was found to be higher than beta diversity (diversity within plots), indicating substantial habitat differentiation even within small areas.

Environmental factors such as pollution can also influence the distribution of lichenicolous fungi, affecting both the lichens and their associated fungi. This can lead to changes in lichen and lichenicolous fungi communities in response to environmental changes.

=== Effects on host lichens ===
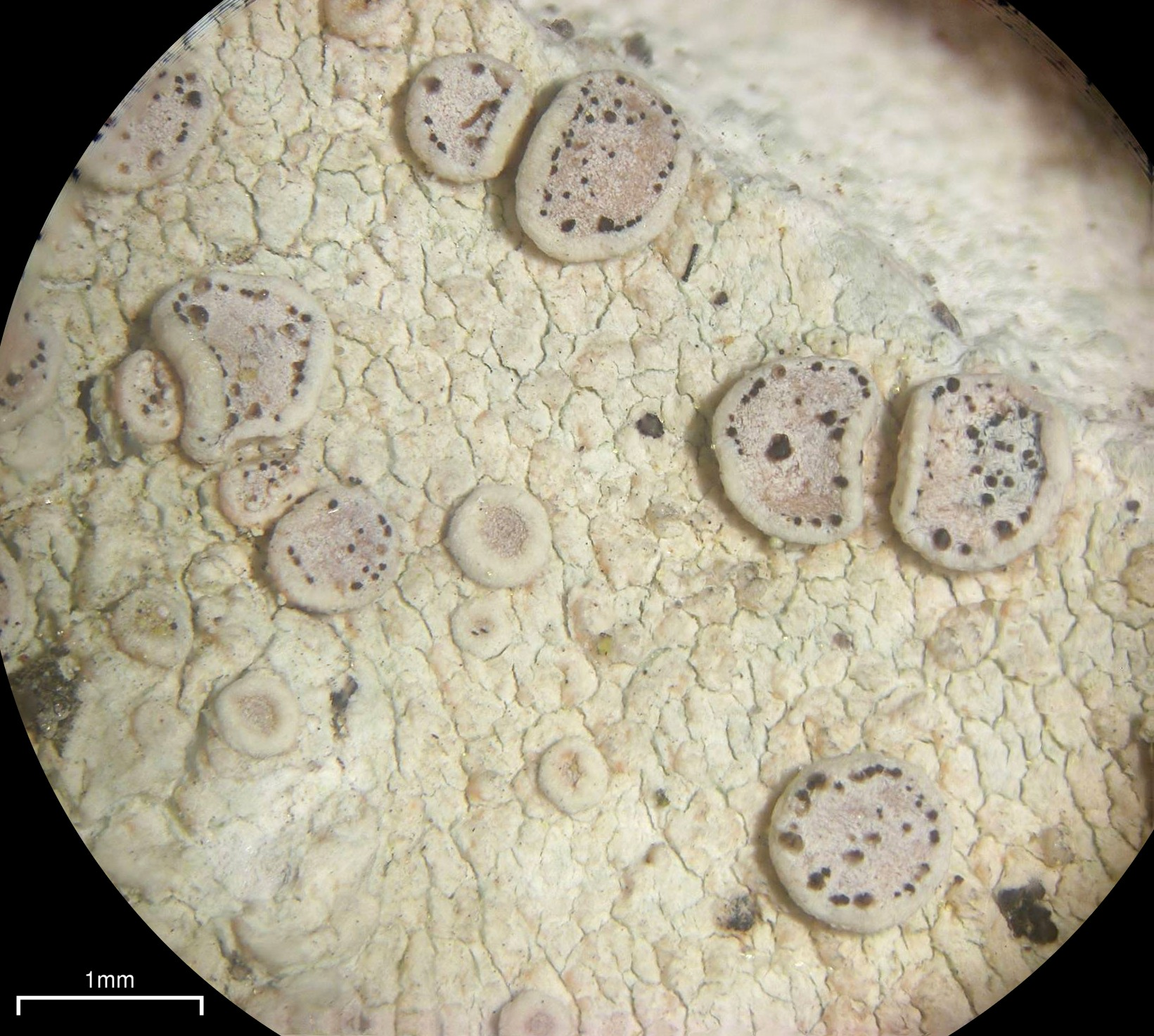
Lichenoconium lecanorae parasitizing Lecanora albella, demonstrating the visible effects of some lichenicolous fungi on their hosts

The impact of lichenicolous fungi on their hosts varies widely, ranging from minor, localised effects to extensive damage or even death of the host lichen. These effects can manifest in various forms, including discolourations, thallus damage, and gall-like malformations.

==== Discolourations ====
Lichenicolous fungi can cause different types of discolourations on their host lichens. These can appear as brownish or whitish necrotic patches, with the extent and pattern of discolouration often depending on the specific fungus-host interaction. For example, Nectriella tincta on Anaptychia fusca and Nesolechia oxyspora on Parmelia saxatilis can cause extensive bleaching of the thallus. Brownish discolourations are characteristic of other species, such as those caused by Lichenoconium echinosporum on Heterodea muelleri.

Some fungi can cause extensive discolourations when luxuriantly developed. A striking example is Xanthoriicola physciae on Xanthoria parietina, which can give the host a soot-spattered appearance and potentially reduce its photosynthetic area to the point of local death.

In contrast, other lichenicolous fungi have very localised effects. For instance, some species only affect the apothecia (fruiting bodies) of their hosts, such as Vouauxiella lichenicola and V. verrucosa on red-fruited Lecanora species, which can result in a piebald appearance of the apothecial discks.

==== Thallus damage ====
Some lichenicolous fungi can cause significant damage to their host lichens. For example, the broad-spectrum pathogen Athelia arachnoidea is known to cause extensive damage in European lichen communities, particularly those affected by air pollution. This species, along with others like Erythricium aurantiacum, Marchandiomyces corallinus, and Parmeliicida pandemica, can severely damage or kill entire lichen populations. In one documented instance, Lecanora conizaeoides recovered from parasitic infection by Licheniconium lecanorae. The lichen accomplished this through vigorous growth at the apothecium's margin, which effectively buried both the damaged hymenium and the parasite's pycnidia within its thallus.

==== Gall-like malformations ====
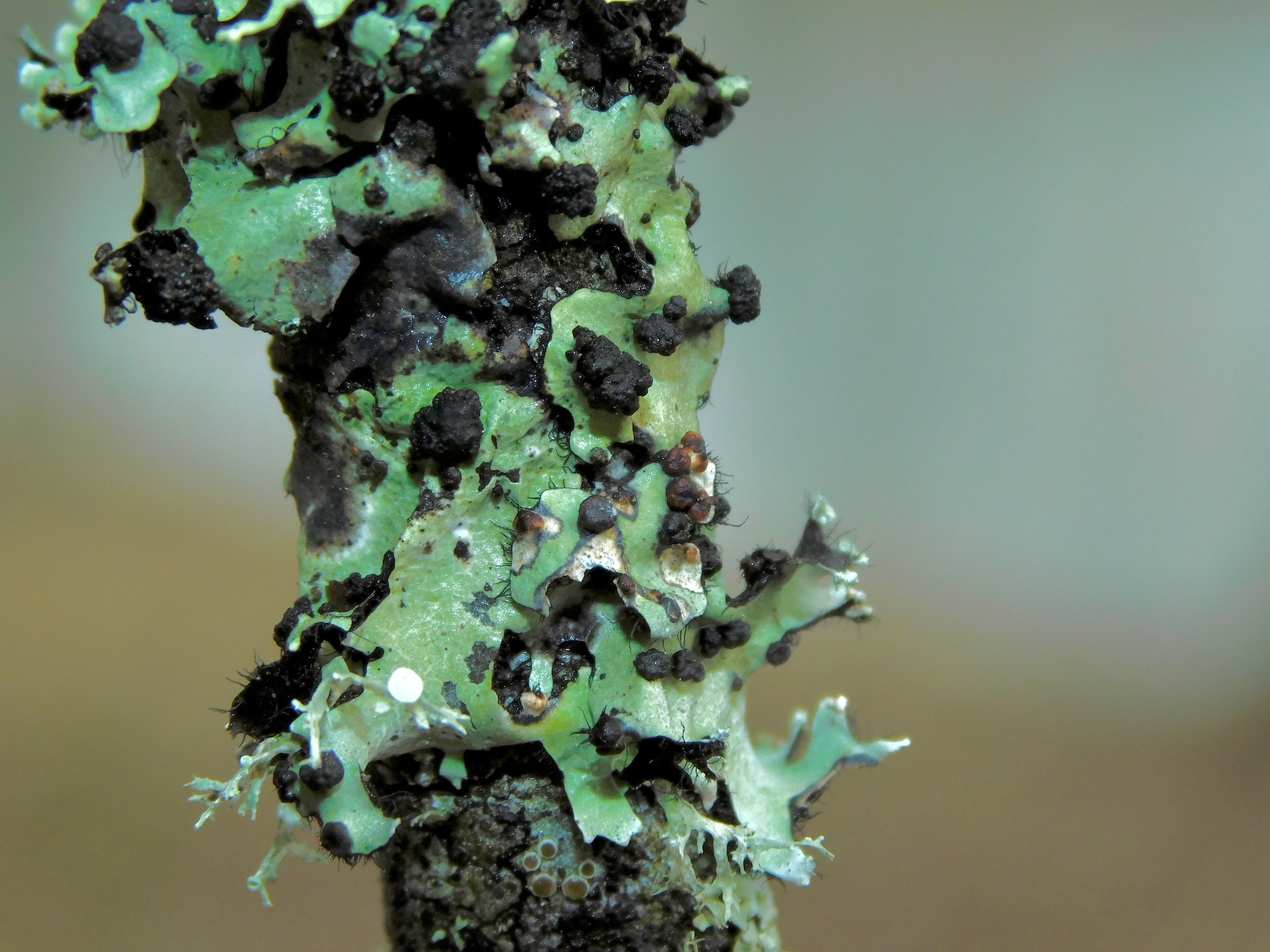
The galls of Tremella parmeliarum, a lichenicolous basidiomycete, are evident on its host lichen Parmotrema reticulatum.

A group of lichenicolous fungi are the cecidogenous (gall-inducing) taxa. Approximately 40 species of lichenicolous ascomycetes and basidiomycetes are known to induce gall formations on their host thalli, often in a species-specific manner. Some of these fungi stimulate the growth of both the mycobiont and photobiont, although the exact mechanisms are not fully understood, while others parasitise the photobiont.

Gall-like malformations can take various forms, from slight swellings to complex structures. For instance, Lichenomyces lichenum forms stipitate apothecium-like galls on Lobaria and Pseudocyphellaria species, sometimes even with thalline margins. Gall formation by lichenicolous fungi exhibits considerable diversity in structure and developmental patterns. These fungal-induced structures can create complex microhabitats, often initiating an intricate ecological succession of various organisms within the gall. For instance, detailed histochemical studies of Biatoropsis usnearum infections on Usnea thalli have revealed that the infection process initiates in the cortical layer of the host. As the gall develops, the parasite forms tremelloid haustoria, primarily in the central part of mature galls. These fully developed galls can then serve as microhabitats for other lichen colonisers, such as species from the genus Cyphobasidium.

Gall-like malformations on lichens are not always caused by fungi. Other organisms, such as mites (Acari, Eriophyoidea) and nematodes, can also induce gall formation in lichens, adding to the complexity of lichen-microorganism interactions.

The effects of lichenicolous fungi on their hosts can be influenced by various factors, including the species involved, environmental conditions, and the health of the host lichen. Some homobasidiomycetes, such as Athelia arachnoidea, show seasonal peaks in their development and can survive as small sclerotia or bulbils on bark or mosses after killing their lichen hosts, appearing to have a facultatively lichenicolous lifestyle.

=== Adaptations and lifestyle transitions ===
Lichenicolous fungi demonstrate remarkable adaptability in their ecological strategies. While many are exclusively lichenicolous, some species can transition between different lifestyles. For instance, Chaenothecopsis consociata (Mycocaliciales) typically invades thalli of Chaenotheca chrysocephala (Caliciaceae, Lecanorales), but can also associate with Dictyochloropsis symbiontica to form its own crustose thallus. Similarly, Athelia arachnoidea is necrotrophic on various lichen taxa, free-living algae, and bryophytes, but has also been identified as the sexual state of Rhizoctonia carotae, a postharvest disease of carrots.

== Lichenicolous lichens ==
Lichenicolous lichens, a subset of lichenicolous fungi, start as parasites on other lichens and eventually become lichenised. This process, called kleptosymbiosis, involves the fungus acquiring photobionts from its host lichen. Diploschistes muscorum exemplifies this phenomenon. Lichenicolous lichens are relatively common; a study in Italy found that 189 of 3005 lichenised species (about 6%) were lichenicolous.

These lichens show distinct biological and ecological characteristics. They are predominantly crustose, mostly have green, non-trentepohlioid algae as photobionts, and primarily reproduce sexually. Ecologically, they tend to occupy specific niches, being mostly saxicolous (growing on rocks) and preferring dry, well-lit habitats across various altitudes. This preference may explain their strategy of "stealing" photobionts, possibly an adaptation to harsh environments where forming new symbioses is challenging. Lichenicolous lichens can have their algal component positioned in two ways: either internally within the host lichen, or externally as distinct thalli on the host's surface. An example of the former is Tetramelas pulverulentus, which grows on Physconia distorta. In contrast, Erichansenia epithallina has been documented growing on the surface or more than a dozen different host lichen species.

Although often called "parasites", many lichenicolous lichens do not strictly fit this definition, as they eventually develop their own thallus. True parasitism frequently occurs in lichenicolous lichens from the genera Acarospora, Diploschistes, Rhizocarpon, and Verrucaria. Researchers suggest that known lichenicolous lichens are only a small part of the total number, and that this strategy might be more widespread than currently recognised. Further DNA sequencing studies could reveal more species of lichenicolous lichens, ranging from obligate to occasional forms.

Examples of lichenicolous lichens
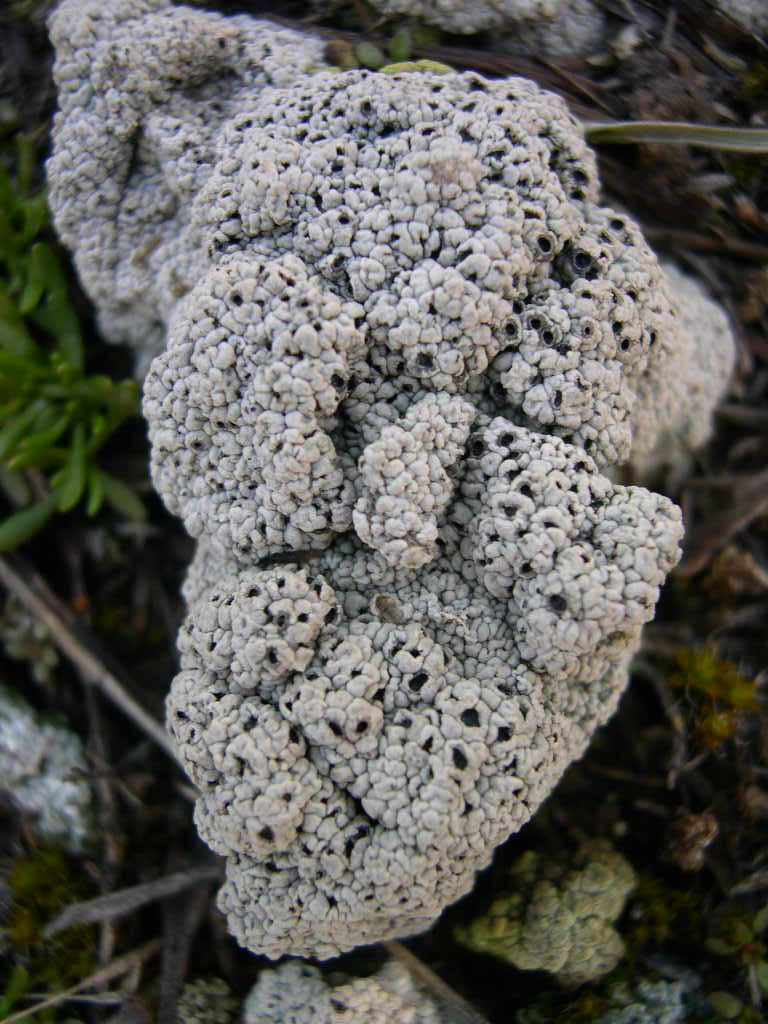
Diploschistes muscorum

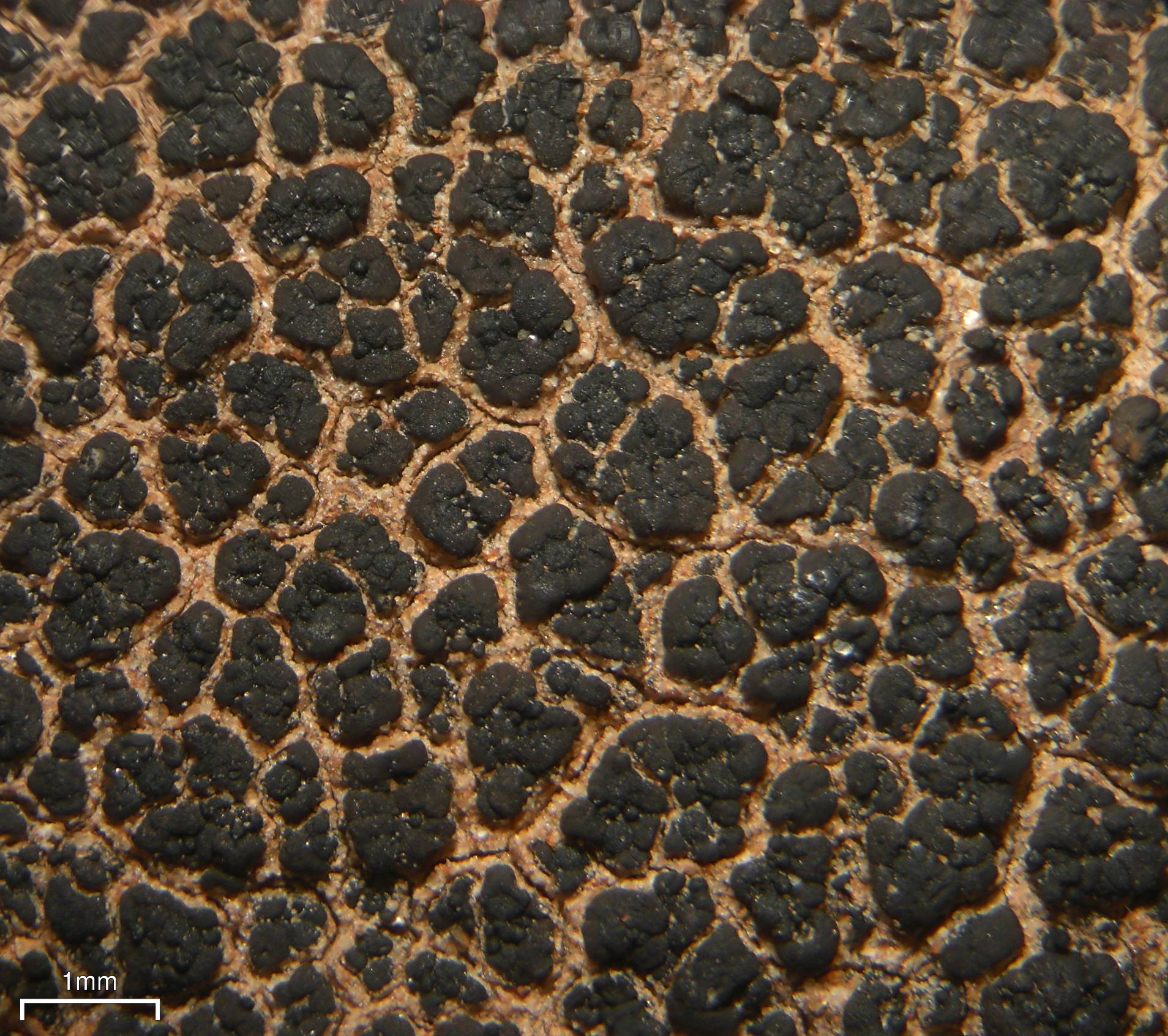
Heteroplacidium compactum

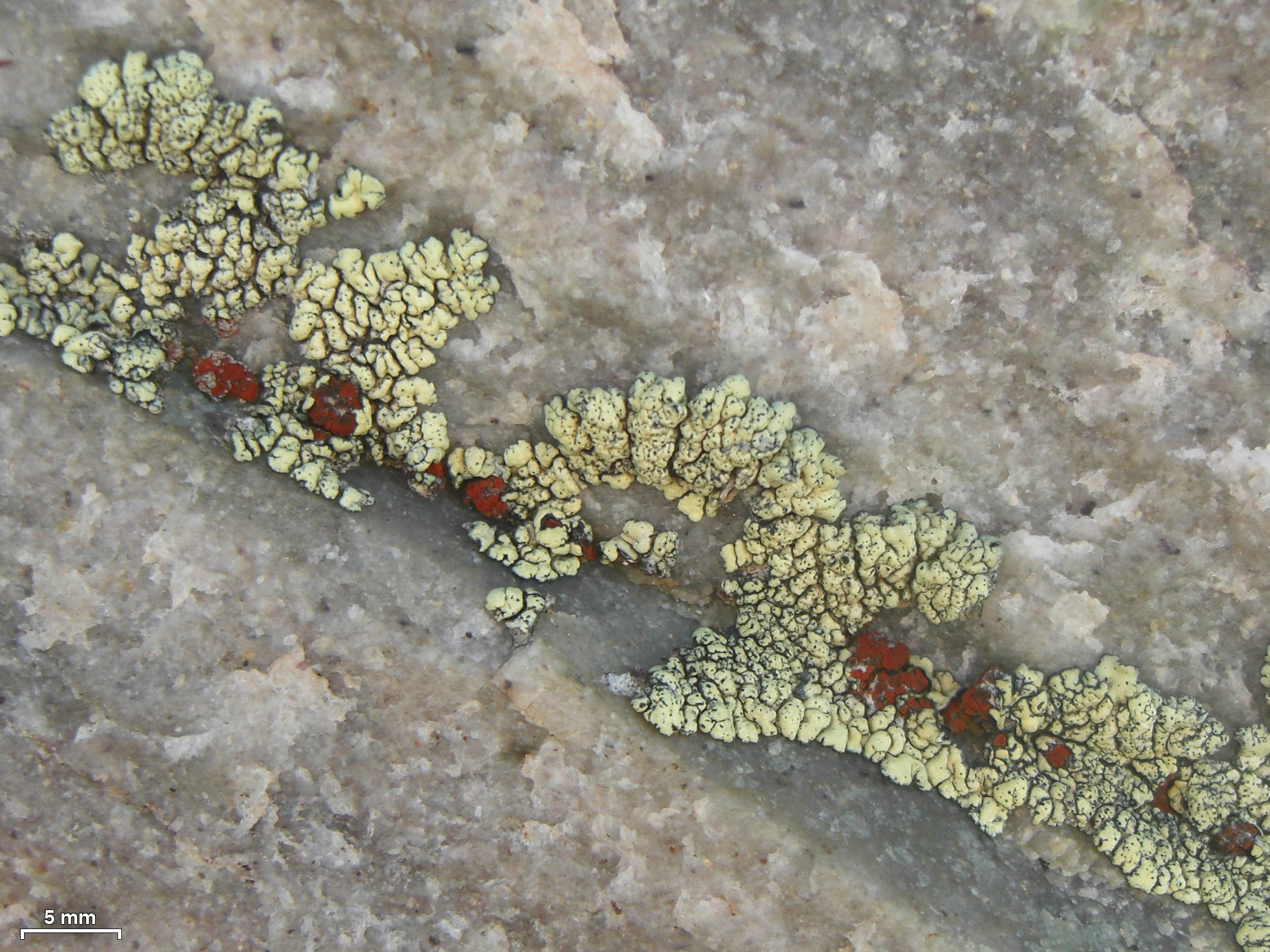
Erichansenia epithallina (red) growing parasitically on the crustose lichen Rhizoplaca novomexicana

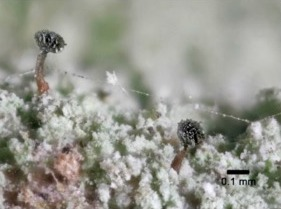
Chaenothecopsis kilimanjaroensis is a lichenicolous pin lichen that grows as either a commensal or parasite on sterile lichen crusts or on the thallus of Chaenotheca chloroxantha

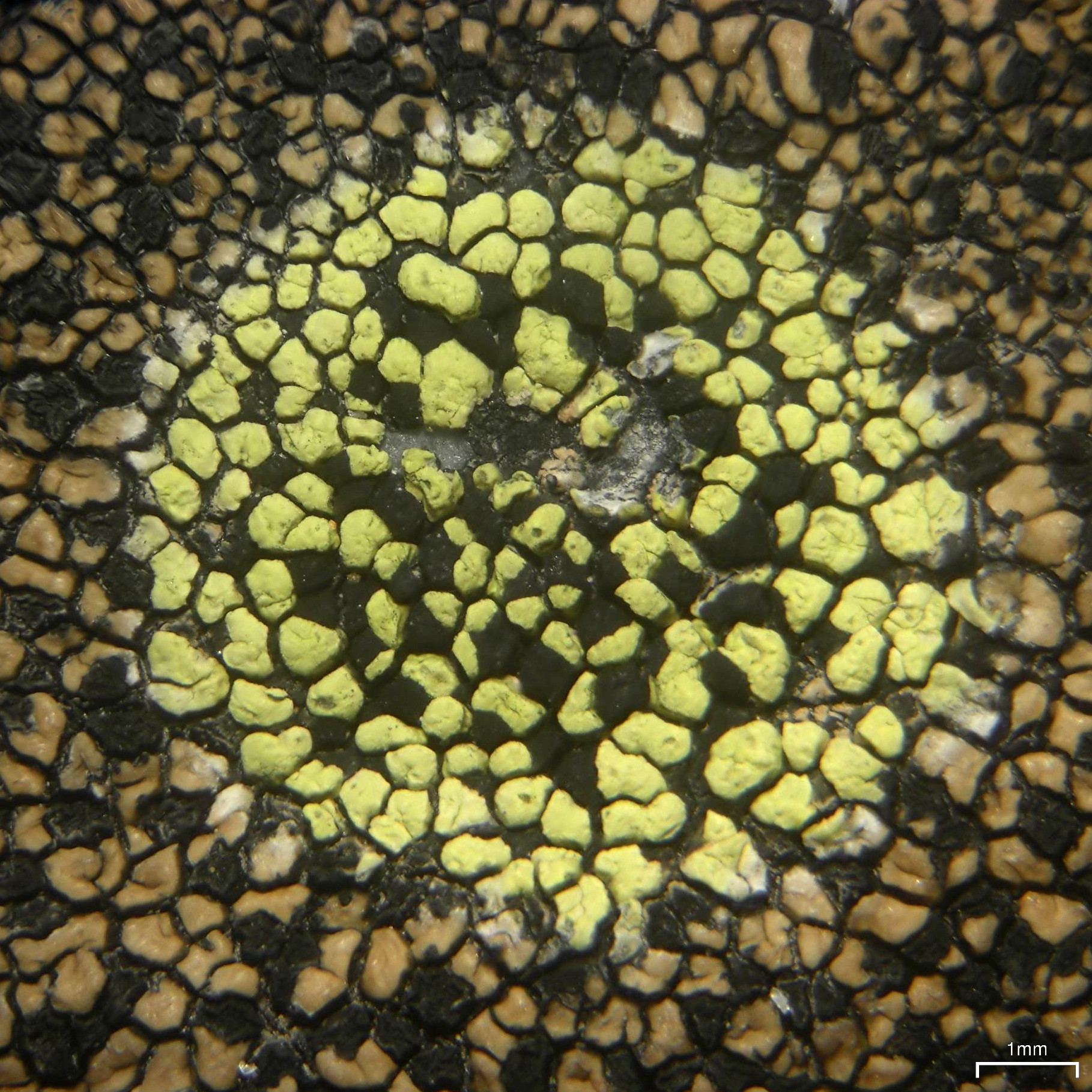
Rhizocarpon pusillum

== Geographical distribution ==
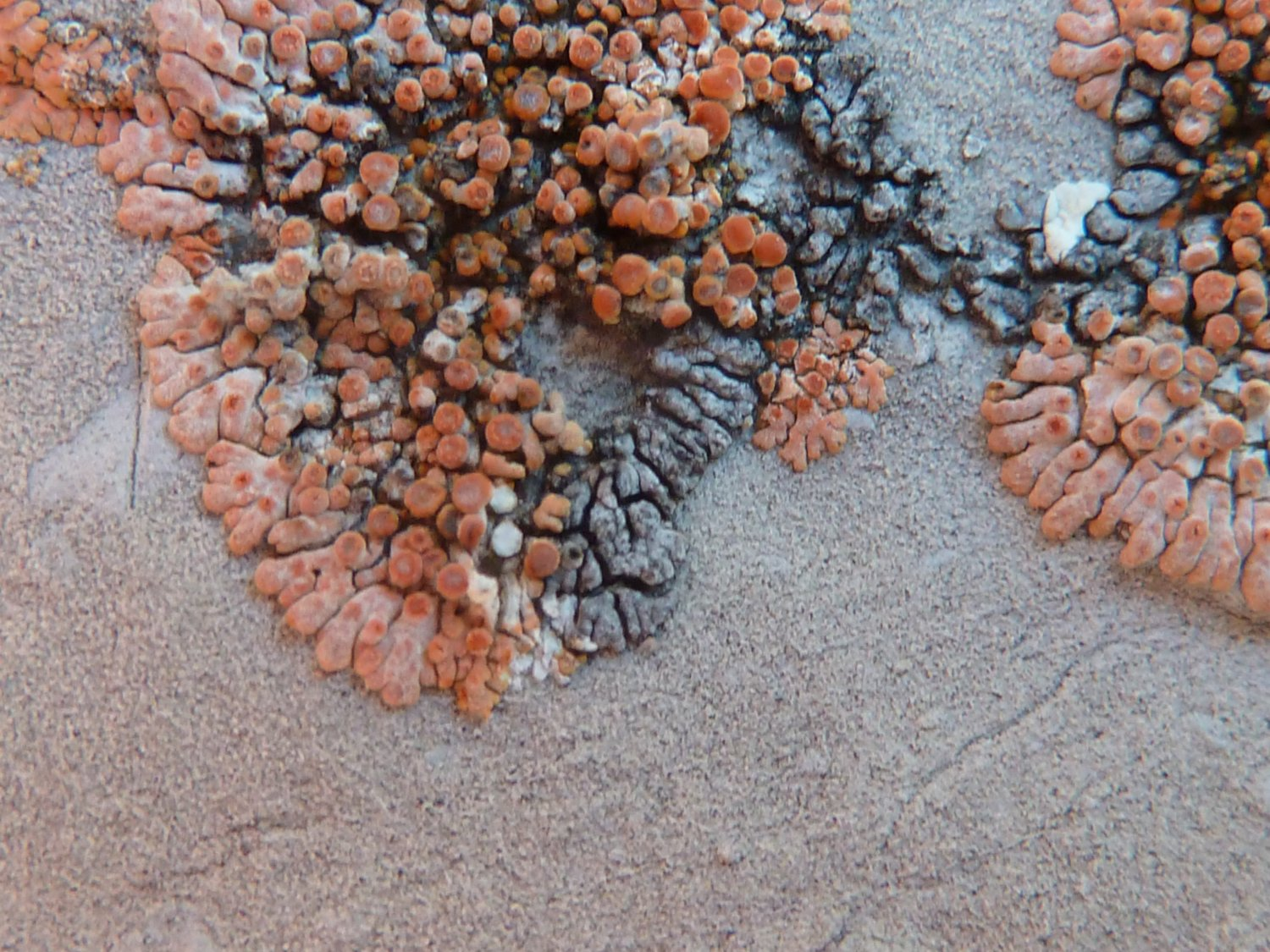
Verrucula arnoldaria (darkened parts of thallus) growing on Calogaya arnoldii

Lichenicolous basidiomycetes are globally distributed, inhabiting diverse environments across all continents. Their presence ranges from the tropics to polar regions, demonstrating their remarkable adaptability. Recent discoveries even extend to the harsh climates of Antarctica, demonstrating the extensive ecological niches these fungi occupy. The current knowledge of their distribution is heavily influenced by the varying levels of exploration and research across different regions. Europe, North America, and to a lesser extent, South America appear to be the best-explored regions. However, this may reflect research effort rather than actual diversity. For instance, while Europe has fewer known species than North America, it has a lower proportion of newly described species, suggesting it may be more thoroughly studied. South America, despite having a large number of known species, is considered under-explored. Systematic studies of lichenicolous fungi in this region only began around 2000, and experts anticipate a substantial increase in known diversity in the coming years. Africa and much of Asia remain poorly explored for lichenicolous basidiomycetes, and the current low numbers of known species likely underrepresent the true diversity in these regions. Similarly, while Oceania has a moderate number of known species, most discoveries have been incidental, and thorough explorations in Australia and New Zealand are expected to yield many more species.

Studies have shown that natural, unpolluted habitats, such as alpine regions, support a high diversity of lichenicolous fungi. For instance, the Koralpe Mountain area in Austria hosts numerous species due to its stable environmental conditions and variety of microhabitats. A study conducted in this region identified 63 lichen and 41 lichenicolous fungal species within a relatively small area, illustrating the rich biodiversity of these communities.

The diversity of lichenicolous fungi is not uniformly distributed across all environments. Habitats that have remained unpolluted and stable over long periods are particularly rich in these fungi. In regions such as Hungary, India, and parts of the Holarctic, including North America, Russia, and Sweden, national checklists have documented numerous species of lichenicolous fungi. These checklists, based on detailed morphological recognition of environmental samples, showcase the species diversity in different environments and on different lichen hosts.

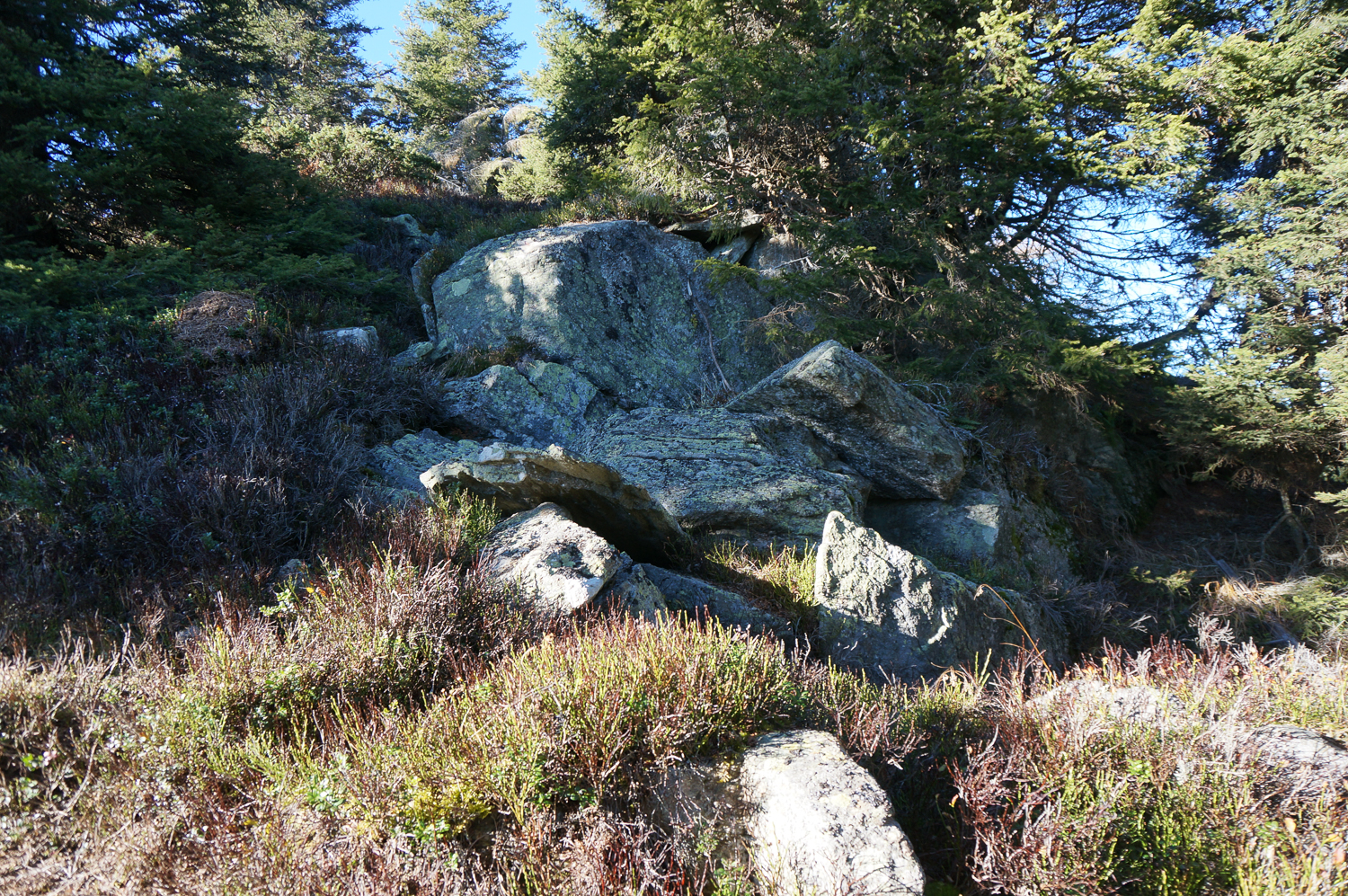
Alpine lichen communities, such as those in the Koralpe mountains, often harbour rich lichenicolous fungus diversity.

Furthermore, alpine and polar regions, which served as refugia during past climatic events, also show high diversity of lichenicolous fungi. The stability and longevity of lichen thalli in these regions create suitable niches for the diverse fungal communities. For example, the alpine lichen communities of the Koralpe Massive in Austria, which is a nunatak area, support an exceptionally rich lichen species diversity due to the varied microhabitats provided by the gneiss and marble outcrops scattered across the landscape.

The cross-taxon analysis approach has shown that lichen abundance and diversity greatly influence the diversity patterns of lichenicolous fungi. This method has demonstrated that lichen communities can serve as reliable surrogates for predicting lichenicolous fungal diversity, aiding in the conservation and study of these specialised fungi.

== Evolutionary aspects ==
The evolutionary relationships between lichens and lichenicolous fungi offer insights into the development of fungal symbioses and parasitism. While not all aspects of their co-evolution are fully understood, several trends and patterns have been observed that shed light on the evolutionary processes at play.

=== Co-evolution of lichens and lichenicolous fungi ===
The high degree of host specificity observed in many lichenicolous fungi suggests a long history of co-evolution with their lichen hosts. This co-evolutionary relationship has likely led to the development of specialised adaptations in both the lichenicolous fungi and their hosts. However, the evolutionary trajectory is not always straightforward, as evidenced by the existence of generalist species that can colonise multiple unrelated lichen hosts.

The evolution of lichenicolous fungi appears to favour strategies that ensure long-term survival without eliminating the host population. This is reflected in the relatively low number of highly pathogenic lichenicolous fungi compared to those that establish more stable, less destructive relationships with their hosts. Such an evolutionary strategy makes sense, as fungi that rapidly kill their hosts risk their own extinction if they are highly host-specific.

=== Trends in host range and symptom development ===
Within genera of lichenicolous fungi, interesting trends have been observed in terms of host range and the symptoms they produce. It is relatively uncommon for a single genus to include more than one species that attacks a particular host lichen. When this does occur, the symptoms produced by each species are almost invariably distinct. This differentiation in symptoms may represent evolutionary adaptations to exploit different niches within the same host, reducing direct competition between closely related species.

For example, within the genus Lichenoconium, L. lecanorae causes the apothecial discs of Lecanora conizaeoides to become blackened while the thallus retains its normal colour. In contrast, L. erodens causes the apothecial disks of the same host to be slightly decolourised and extensive whitish lesions to form in the thallus. This differentiation in symptoms allows both species to coexist on the same host species by exploiting different parts of the lichen thallus.

Another evolutionary trend observed is the tendency for one fungus in a genus to be parasymbiotic and another parasitic when on the same host. For instance, Corticifraga peltigerae is parasitic on Peltigera thalli, forming bleached circular patches, whereas Corticifraga fuckelii is apparently parasymbiotic on the same host. This suggests that even within a single genus, different species may evolve varying degrees of pathogenicity or mutualism with their hosts.

== Research history ==
The study of lichenicolous fungi dates back to the mid-18th century, predating the recognition of lichens as symbiotic organisms. However, the field has seen significant growth and development in recent decades.

=== Early observations ===
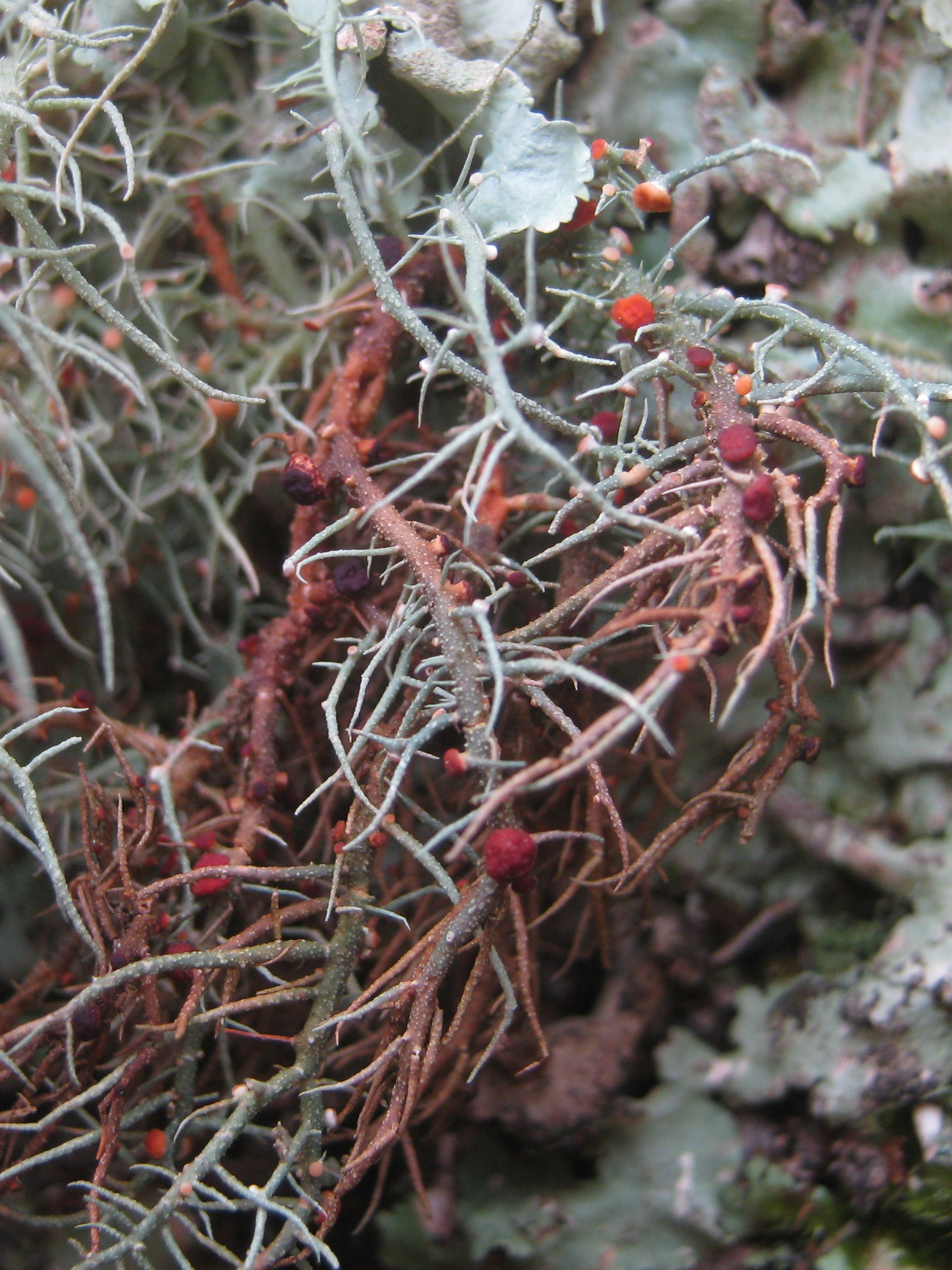
Biatoropsis usnearum, a parasite of Usnea, was one of the first documented lichenicolous fungi.

One of the earliest documented observations of a lichenicolous fungus was Biatoropsis usnearum, a heterobasidiomycete forming gall-like structures on Usnea thalli. Johann Jakob Dillenius illustrated this phenomenon in his 1742 work Historia Muscorum. Erik Acharius further discussed and illustrated Usnea specimens infected by B. usnearum in 1795. In 1810, Acharius published detailed colour illustrations distinguishing between normal disc-shaped apothecia and the nodule-like, bulging structures he termed cephalodia in Usnea. These "cephalodia" are now recognised as the basidiomata of Biatoropsis usnearum.

=== 19th and 20th centuries ===
The 19th century saw an increase in the description of lichenicolous fungi species. William Lauder Lindsay presented the first overview of the group in 1869. Friedrich Wilhelm Zopf provided a list of lichen hosts and their associated fungi in 1896. Several researchers made important contributions during this period, preparing detailed illustrated critical accounts of both the taxonomy and biology of selected species. Notable works include those by Charles Tulasne (1852), William Lauder Lindsay (1869), and Friedrich Wilhelm Zopf (1897). Henri Olivier provided a detailed account of lichenicolous fungi from France (1905–1907), while Léon Vouaux published a worldwide flora with keys and descriptions of all known species (1912–1914). Karl von Keissler revised the Central European species in 1930.

Henri Olivier gave a detailed account of lichenicolous fungi from France (1905–1907), while Léon Vouaux published a worldwide flora with keys and descriptions of all known species (1912–1914). Karl von Keissler revised the Central European species in 1930.

In the early 20th century, Werner and his co-workers carried out developmental and biological investigations on a few species, contributing to the growing body of knowledge about lichenicolous fungi. Despite the early interest, lichenicolous fungi were often overlooked due to their inconspicuous nature and the specialised knowledge required to study them. This led to a period of relative neglect in the mid-20th century. The study of these organisms was challenging, as researchers needed expertise in both mycology and lichenology to accurately identify and characterise them.

=== Modern era ===
A resurgence of interest in lichenicolous fungi occurred in the late 20th century. Georges Clauzade and Claude Roux compiled 457 species in 1976, which increased to 686 species by 1989. David Hawksworth's 1983 publication of keys to 218 lichenicolous species from the British Isles stimulated further research. Comprehensive revisions of major groups followed, including lichenicolous hyphomycetes (Hawksworth 1979), Coelomycetes (Hawksworth 1981), and heterobasidiomycetes (Diederich 1996).

The inclusion of lichenicolous fungi in national lichen checklists, beginning with Rolf Santesson's 1993 checklist of Sweden and Norway, further encouraged their study, and from 1989 to 2003 the number of known species roughly doubled. In The Lives of Lichens (2024), lichenologists Robert Lücking and Toby Spribille noted that the collecting and identifying of lichenicolous fungi has become a lichenological subculture in its own right, with its own literature, websites and social media groups.

=== Historical challenges in conidiomata studies ===
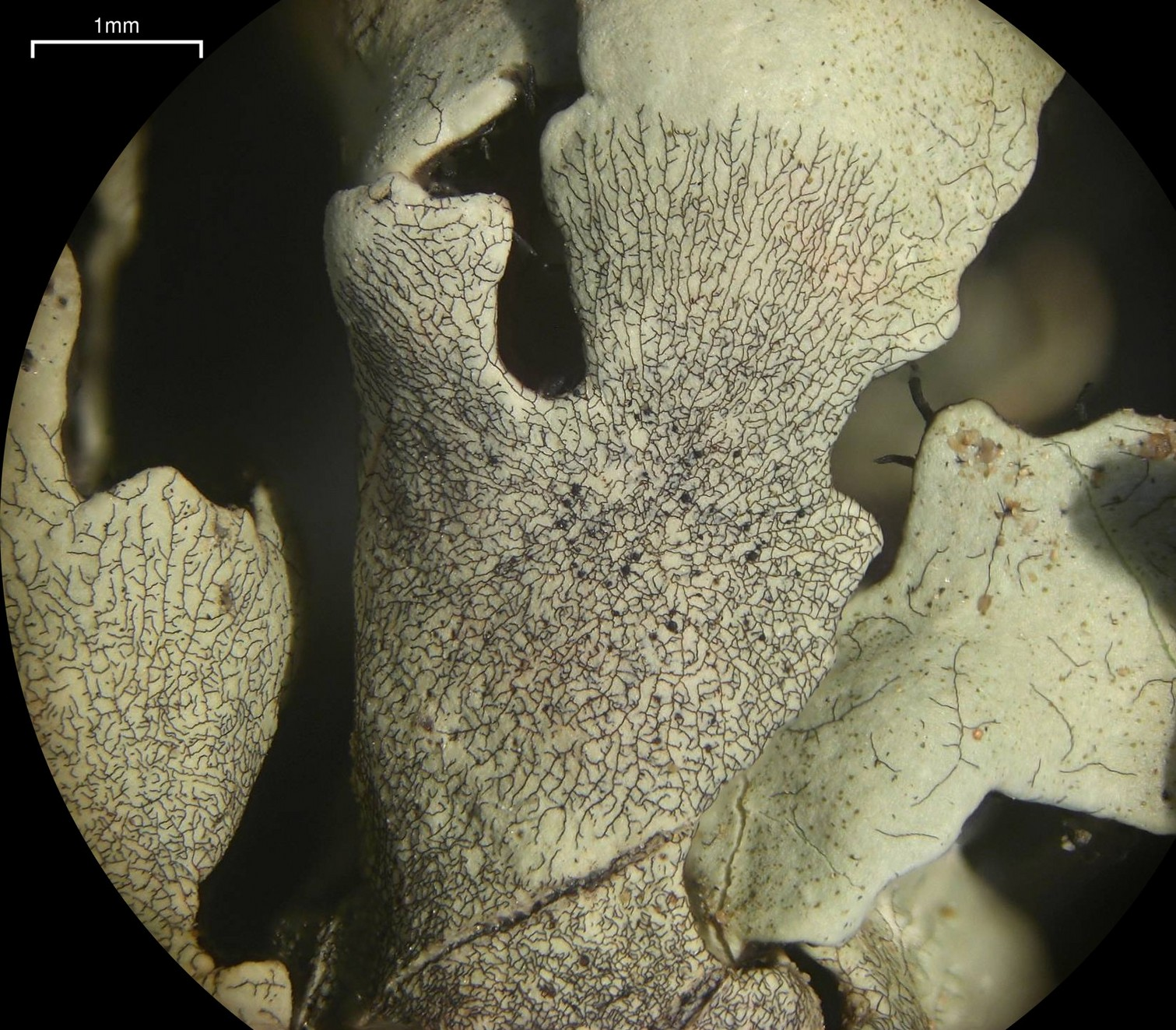
Lichenostigma cosmopolites growing on Xanthoparmelia stenophylla; scale bar=1 mm

Early research on lichens and lichenicolous fungi faced challenges in distinguishing between the conidiomata of the lichen mycobiont and those of lichenicolous fungi. David L. Hawksworth summarised the complexity of these structures and the potential for misinterpretation.

Conidiomata in lichens can take various forms, including roughly spherical ("globose") or flask-shaped ("pycnidia"), cupuliform ("acervular"), cushion-like ("sporodochia"), hooded or peltate ("campylidia"), or erect ("synnemata", "hyphophores"). The most common type in lichen-forming fungi is the pycnidial conidiomata, which opens by a single pore. These structures were often termed "spermogonia" in early literature when presumed to have a sexual role.

Hawksworth noted that the study of conidiophores and conidiogenous cells was challenging due to their small size. Advancements in microscopy techniques, such as the use of biologically active washing powders prior to fixing and critical point drying for scanning electron microscopy, have allowed for more detailed examinations of these structures.

A recurring problem in early studies was distinguishing the conidiomata of the lichen mycobiont from those of a lichenicolous fungus, especially when the invading fungus caused little or no visible damage to its host. In some cases, new names for conidial fungi were mistakenly based on the normal conidiomata of the host lichen itself; the genus Pyrenotrichum, for instance, was founded on what are now known to be the campylidia of various foliicolous (leaf-dwelling) lichens.

== Methods ==
The study of lichenicolous fungi draws on methods ranging from traditional culture techniques to molecular approaches.

=== Isolation and culture techniques ===
Traditional mycological methods form the foundation for studying lichenicolous fungi. These techniques are crucial for understanding their biology and interactions with lichen hosts. Researchers typically begin by collecting infected lichen tissues from the field. They identify fungal parasites by their fruiting structures or the discolouration they cause on lichen thalli. In the laboratory, these structures are isolated and cultured on solid agar media such as Sabouraud's medium, potato dextrose agar, or cornmeal agar. To reduce contamination, surface sterilisation with ethanol or sodium hypochlorite is often necessary. For accurate identification and genetic studies, researchers prefer single-spore or single-conidium cultures. This process involves:

- Macerating mature fruiting structures to release spores or conidia
- Incubating these on agar plates
- Maintaining cultures in controlled environments

Some lichenicolous fungi require specific growth conditions, such as low-nitrogen media or the presence of lichen tissues. These cultured fungi are valuable for various experiments, including studies on degradative abilities, interactions with lichen secondary metabolites, and genetic analyses. To ensure future availability and identity verification, researchers often deposit cultures in recognised fungal culture collections.

=== Modern research methods ===
The study of lichenicolous fungi employs a range of methodologies, from traditional culture techniques to advanced molecular approaches. Researchers typically begin by collecting infected lichen tissues from the field. They identify fungal parasites by their fruiting structures or the discolouration they cause on lichen thalli. In the laboratory, these structures are isolated and cultured on solid agar media such as Sabouraud's medium, potato dextrose agar, or cornmeal agar. To reduce contamination, surface sterilisation with ethanol or sodium hypochlorite is often necessary.

For accurate identification and genetic studies, researchers prefer single-spore or single-conidium cultures. This process involves:

- Macerating mature fruiting structures to release spores or conidia
- Incubating these on agar plates
- Maintaining cultures in controlled environments

Some lichenicolous fungi require specific growth conditions, such as low-nitrogen media or the presence of lichen tissues. These cultured fungi are valuable for various experiments, including studies on degradative abilities, interactions with lichen secondary metabolites, and genetic analyses. To ensure future availability and identity verification, researchers often deposit cultures in recognised fungal culture collections.

In recent years, culture-independent methods, particularly those employing molecular techniques, have revolutionised the study of lichenicolous fungi. These include:

- DNA sequencing: Allows precise identification and phylogenetic analysis of species
- Environmental DNA (eDNA) analysis: Enables detection of lichenicolous fungi in environmental samples, even when not visible
- Metagenomics: Provides insights into the entire microbial community associated with lichens

These modern techniques have revealed a high diversity of lichen-associated fungi, many of which remain undetected by traditional methods. For instance, DNA fingerprinting techniques have shown a high diversity of lichen-associated fungi that does not necessarily correlate with the presence of externally visible lichenicolous fungi. Next-generation sequencing studies of lichen mycobiomes in various habitats, from Arctic to alpine environments, have further expanded our understanding of the diversity and distribution of these fungi.

These molecular methods suggest that the true number of lichenicolous fungal species may far exceed current estimates, perhaps reaching 3,000–5,000. Traditional microscopy nevertheless remains essential, particularly for understanding the physical interactions between parasite and host. Distinguishing foreign hyphae within a lichen thallus from those of the mycobiont itself is still difficult, and in practice most taxonomic work now combines microscopic and molecular evidence.

=== Cross-taxon analysis ===
Cross-taxon analysis is a research method used to study the correlation between different taxonomic groups by analysing their diversity patterns. In the context of lichenicolous fungi, this method helps understand how the diversity of these fungi relates to their lichen hosts. By collecting data on both lichens and lichenicolous fungi from the same habitats, researchers can identify patterns and relationships between the two groups. For example, studies in the Koralpe Mountains of Austria have shown that the diversity of lichenicolous fungi closely follows the diversity of their lichen hosts, suggesting that lichens can be used as indicators to predict the presence and diversity of these fungi.

This approach uses statistical techniques like co-correspondence analysis to create predictive models, which have shown that certain lichen species, especially those that are abundant and widely distributed, can reliably indicate the diversity of lichenicolous fungi. This method not only enhances our understanding of the ecological relationships between lichens and lichenicolous fungi but also provides a practical tool for biodiversity conservation. By using lichens as surrogate indicators, researchers can more efficiently identify and protect areas with high biodiversity, particularly in underexplored regions.

=== Research ===
Molecular studies have revealed that lichenicolous fungi may possess broader host ranges than previously inferred from morphological observations alone. Researchers have detected some species in asymptomatic lichens and even in lichen species not previously known to host these fungi.

Recent estimates indicate that the actual number of lichenicolous fungal species may far exceed current descriptions, potentially reaching 3,000–5,000 species. This suggests substantial potential for discovering new species and genera through the application of molecular methods.

== Conservation ==
Lichenicolous fungi present special challenges in conservation assessment because they are obligately associated with lichens, yet often do not occupy every potential host individual. A 2024 review of Red List practice for lichenized fungi recommended counting host-specific lichenicolous fungi by the functional individuals of their host lichens, and suggested that a host-specific species on a threatened host should generally be regarded as at least as threatened as the host itself. The review also noted that, as of 2024, no lichenicolous fungi had yet been globally evaluated for the IUCN Red List.

== See also ==
- List of lichenicolous fungi of Iceland
