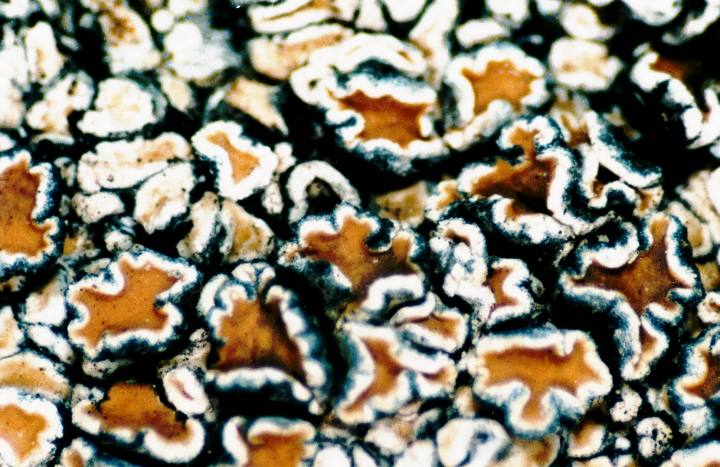
- Lecanora muralis

Scientific classification
- Kingdom: Fungi
- Division: Ascomycota
- Class: Lecanoromycetes
- Order: Lecanorales
- Suborder: Lecanorineae

= Lecanorineae =

Suborder of fungi

Lecanorineae are a suborder of pezizomycetes fungi, commonly known as the lichens and rostrate asci.

== Families ==
- Aphanopsidaceae
- Byssolomataceae
- Carbonicolaceae
- Catillariaceae
- Cetradoniaceae
- Cladoniaceae
- Crocyniaceae
- Gypsoplacaceae
- Haematommataceae
- Lecanoraceae
- Malmideaceae
- Micareaceae
- Parmeliaceae
- Porpidiaceae
- Psilolechiaceae
- Psoraceae
- Ramalinaceae
- Ramboldiaceae
- Sphaerophoraceae
- Squamarinaceae
- Stereocaulaceae
- Tephromelataceae
- Lecanorineae incertae sedis
  - Lichenosticta
  - Schistophoron
