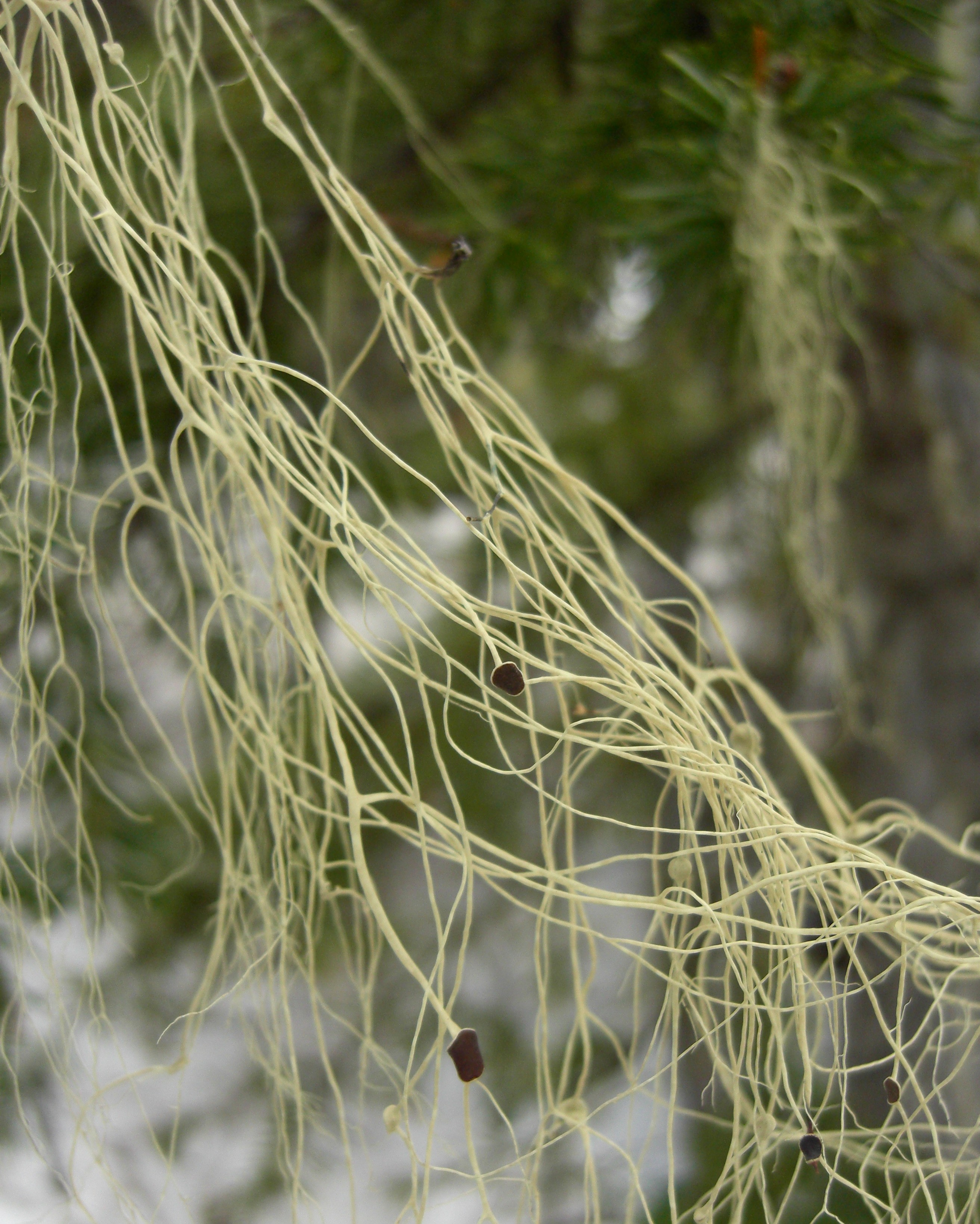

Conservation status
- Secure (NatureServe)

Scientific classification
- Kingdom: Fungi
- Division: Ascomycota
- Class: Lecanoromycetes
- Order: Lecanorales
- Family: Parmeliaceae
- Genus: Alectoria
- Species: A. sarmentosa

Binomial name
- Alectoria sarmentosa (Ach.) Ach. (1810)

Synonyms
- Lichen sarmentosus Ach. (1792)

= Alectoria sarmentosa =

Species of hair lichen

Alectoria sarmentosa (common witch's-hair lichen) is a long-lived, perennial witch's-hair lichen. It is a light greenish colored and fruticose or bushy bodied. This epiphytic lichen belongs to the family Parmeliaceae and the suborder Lecanorineae, which includes six similar species. A. sarmentosa grows draped or strung over conifer tree limbs and deciduous shrub branches in Northern temperate rainforest. This lichen favors mature and old growth, wet conifer and hardwood forests with clean air. A. sarmentosa is sensitive to air pollution and used for air quality monitoring. Areas required by A. sarmentosa are found in northern and southern temperate zones and receive high rainfall. This lichen is commonly found in transitional areas between valley and mountainous forests, but usually avoiding the immediate coast.

The common name for A. sarmentosa is witch's hair lichen. This common name is used for most Alectoria species. A similar-looking species commonly confused with A. sarmentosa is Usnea longissima. These lichens are similar in color and growth patterns but A. sarmentosa lacks a central chord that characterizes the genus Usnea.

== Description ==
The thalli, or body, of Alectoria sarmentosa are fruticose, stringy, and extensively branched. Each branch usually divides into two to four sections. The thicker branches are typically greater than 2.5 mm in diameter. This Lichen is an epiphyte which means it has no roots. It depends on deriving its moisture and nutrients from the air, rain. Color varies between species of Alectoria. A. sarmentosa has been recorded varying in color from grayish green to yellowish green, occasionally blackening towards the ends, with small white raised ridges on surface. The thalli of A. sarmentosa form extensive mats up to 10–30 cm long. These mats hang down in a pendulous fashion. Some mats can form dense collections that create curtain like formations. A. sarmentosa are prone to fragmentation by wind.

== Reproduction ==
Reproduction in most other lichens is usually by tiny saucer-like fruiting bodies called apothecia. These bodies are relatively not seen in Alectoria species. Alectoria means ‘unmarried,’ referring to this lack of these apothecia reproduction fruiting bodies. Since it lacks these reproduction fruiting bodies, A. sarmentosa uses asexual plant propagation, when bits of it are blown off a branch and land on another branch or the same or near by conifer or shrub.

== Habitat ==
Alectoria sarmentosa ranges throughout northern hemisphere temperate rainforests. These rainforests are located in the temperate zone and receive high rainfall. They receive 846mm (minimum) to 5,600mm (maximum) annual precipitation. Alectoria Ach. species and subspecies have a global range and are found in Pacific Northwest Coast forests, including Alaska, Coastal British Columbia, Oregon, Washington, and northern California, west of Alberta and Montana. It also has been identified in the Appalachian Mountains temperate rainforest of Eastern U.S. and Boreal rainforests of New Brunswick and Nova Scotia Canada, as well as Scandinavian coastal conifer forests. It is common in boreal or taiga forests and prehumid rainforests. Usually found at transitions between valley and mountain forests, low to mid elevations. Avoiding the immediate coast.

Alectoria sarmentosa is commonly associated with old growth forests in these regions. This lichen is very dependent on forest structure (Canopy height cover and composition), edge characteristics and climate. It dominates canopy gaps edges, where sunlight reaches the lower to mid levels of the forest canopy. In these areas of old growth A. sarmentosa grows on bark and wood; found pendulously draped over branches of conifer trees, hardwood trees and deciduous shrubs. It is rarely found growing on rock or mosses over rock. It is sometimes seen on the ground due to fragmentation by wind.

== Ecology ==
Research has shown that Alectoria sarmentosa, characterized by its pale yellow-green coloration due to usnic acid, shows distinct ecological preferences from darker melanic hair lichens. Studies in coniferous forests have demonstrated that this species achieves its highest abundance in more sheltered locations, particularly on north-facing slopes and in lower canopy positions where light levels are moderate. While A. sarmentosa can successfully establish in relatively young forests (around 60 years old), it is often considered an old-growth forest associate. The species has been found to benefit from humid conditions, with its cortical structure optimized for light transmission to underlying photobionts in shaded sites. Unlike melanic hair lichens, A. sarmentosa shows less tolerance for high light exposure, especially in drier regions, due to its relatively transparent cortex when dry. This habitat preference reflects an evolutionary adaptation where its pale pigmentation and thallus structure are optimized for photosynthetic efficiency in shadier, more humid forest conditions.

== Similar species ==
Species of Alectoria include Alectoria fallacina, Alectoria imshaugii, Alectoria lata; Alectoria nigricans, Alectoria ochroleuca and Alectoria vancouvernsis. The common name Witch’s Hair Lichen also applies to these Alectoria species. Another species that is superficially similar and mistaken as A. sarmentosa is various Usnea. Usnea longissima differs as it has a central chord which A. sarmentosa lacks

== Uses ==
Alectoria sarmentosa and similar species provide reasonably good nutrition to animals and are important winter browsing vegetation. Sitka black tailed deer and Caribou eat the lichen off reachable, low branches or off of the ground when it is blown down onto the snow during winter storms. Flying squirrels are also known to make use of Alectoria sarmentosa and other lichens in their diet and as nest material.

Many indigenous peoples of the Pacific Northwest Coast and the Nuxalk people of Canada used the fibers of Alectoria lichens. These fibers were especially useful for making baby diapers and bandages. They used the fibers as aesthetic false whiskers and hair for decorating dance masks. Some interior Alaskan and Canadian people wove ponchos and footwear using fibers of Alectoria sarmentosa. This type of clothing was inferior to hides.

=== Biomonitoring ===
Alectoria sarmentosa, among other lichens can be used to monitor air quality. When these lichens are exposed to they accumulate unavoidable pollutants because they lack deciduous parts. Because most lichens are epiphytes, which do not have roots, they do not have access to soil nutrients and draw their needed nutrients from deposition, water seeping over substrate surfaces, atmospheric and other dilute sources. Therefore the lichens mirror the accumulation of the pollutions in the air. A. sarmentosa is frequently collected for tissue element analysis as it is a sensitive tool for detection of changes in air quality.

== Gallery ==
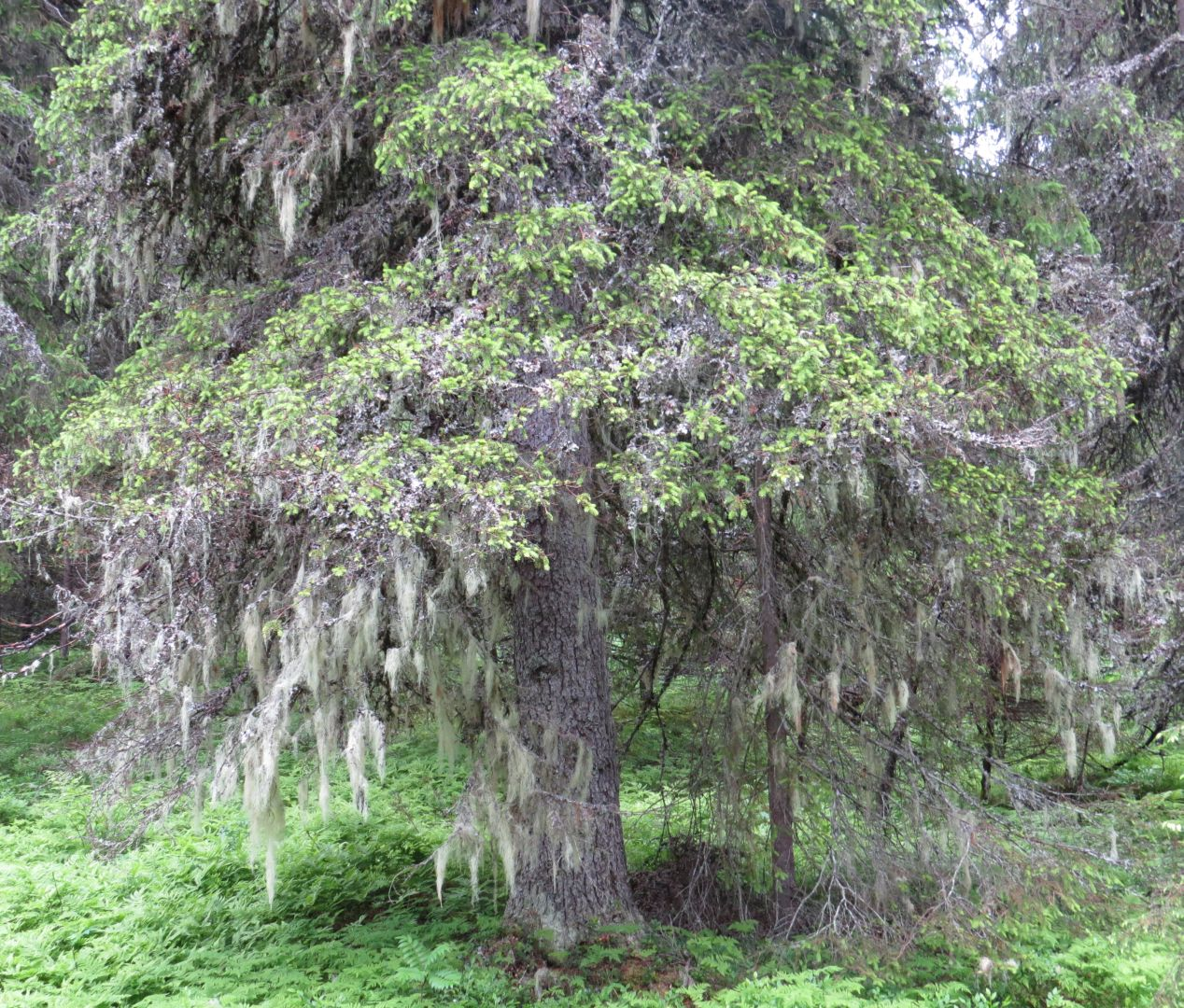
Lots of Alectoria sarmentosa in old spruce

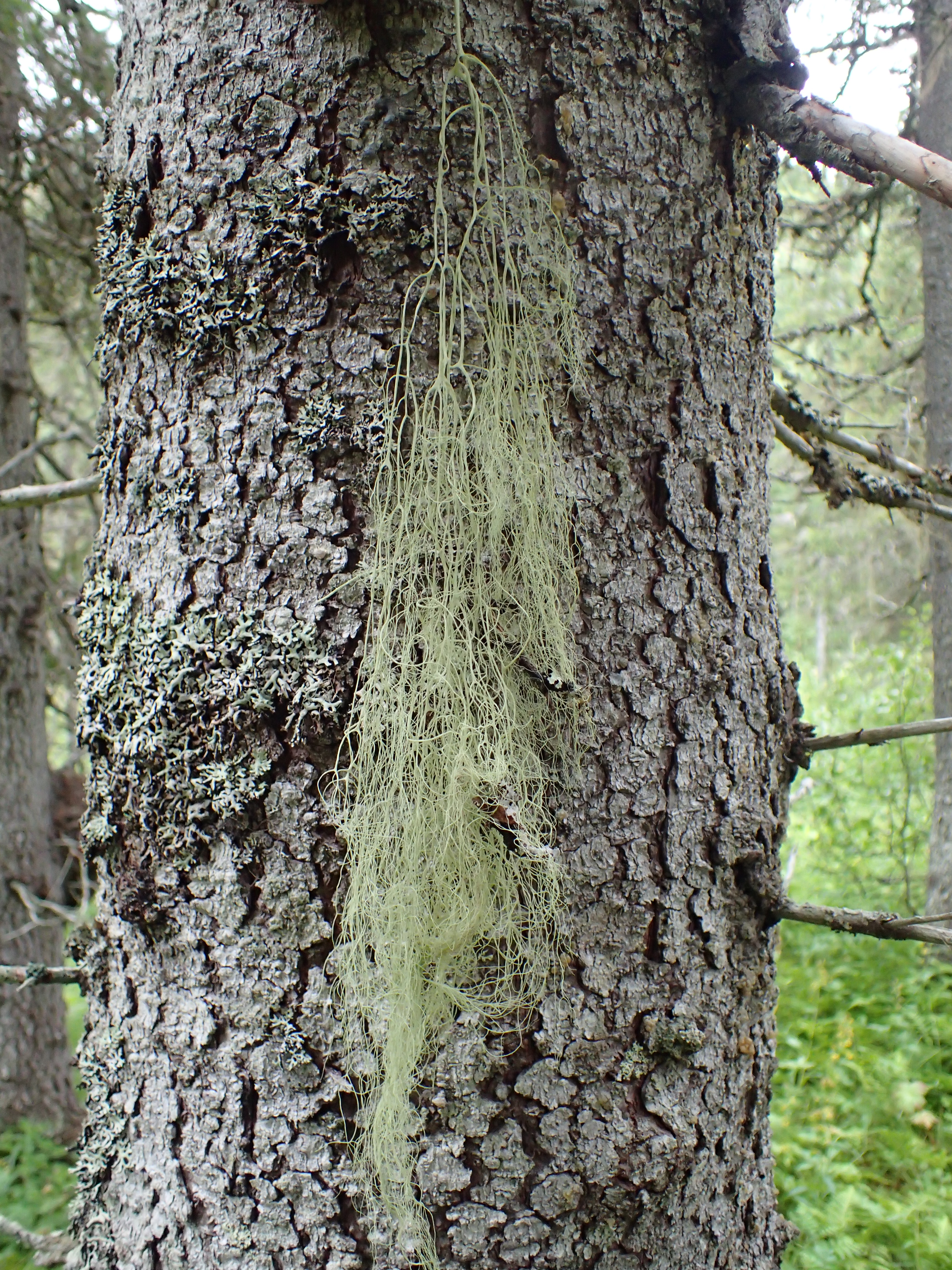
Alectoria sarmentosa developed on spruce trunk

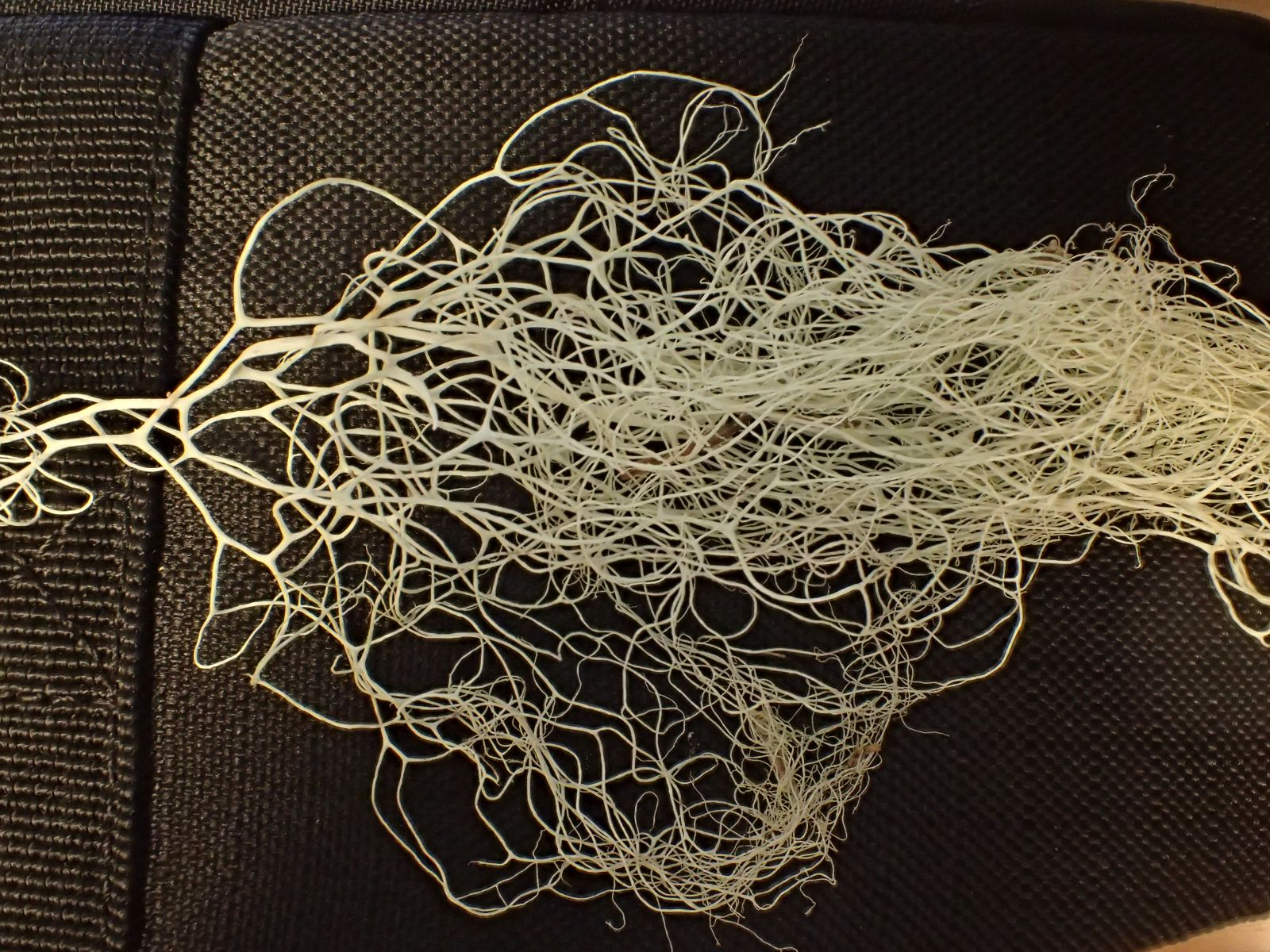
Alectoria sarmentosa, detail of structure
