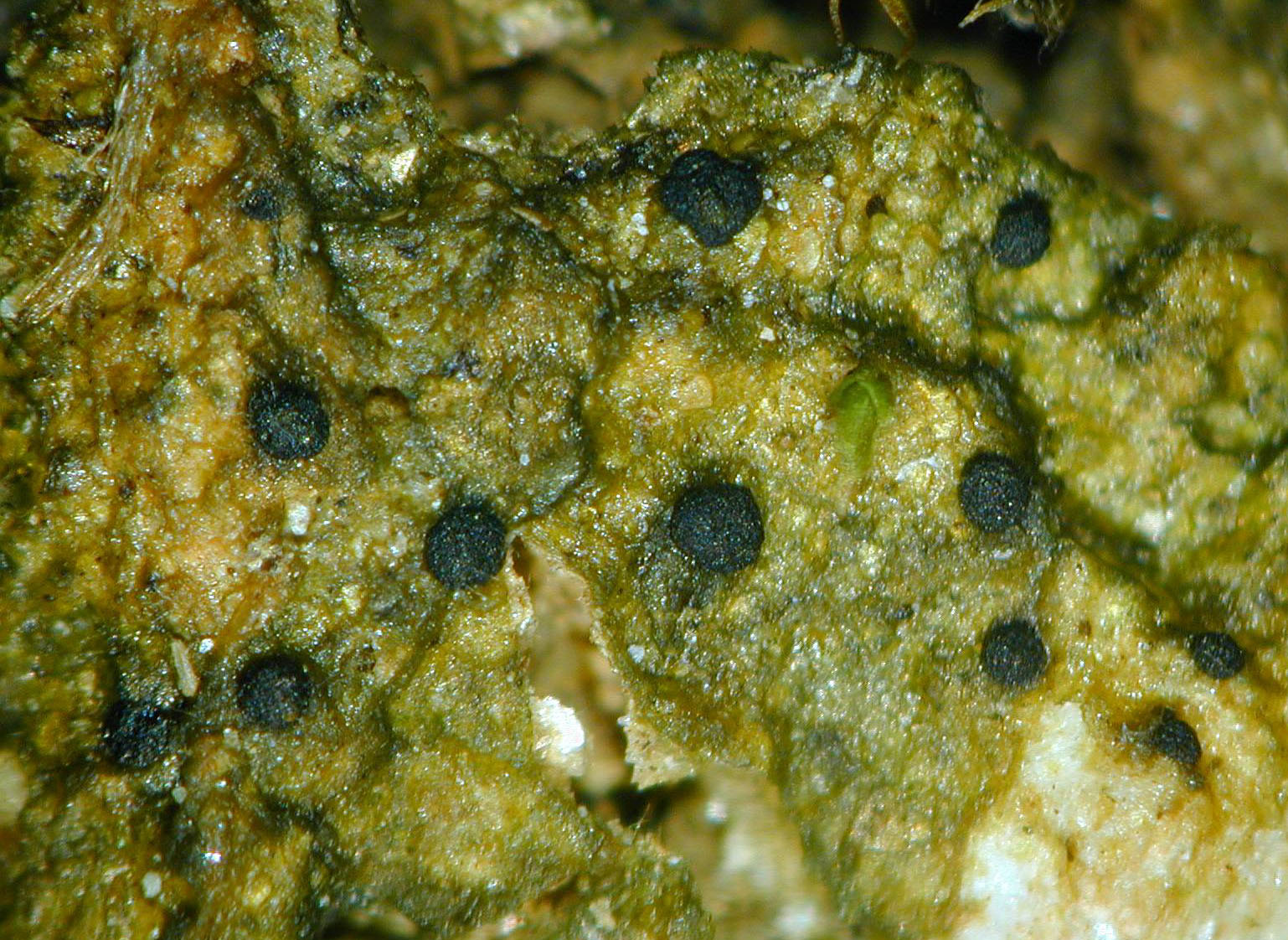
- Steinia geophana

Scientific classification
- Kingdom: Fungi
- Division: Ascomycota
- Class: Lecanoromycetes
- Order: Lecanorales
- Family: Aphanopsidaceae
- Genus: Steinia; Körb. (1873)

Type species
- Steinia luridescens Körb. (1873)

Species
- S. australis S. geophana S. luridescens

Synonyms
- Agyrina (Sacc.) Clem. (1909); Agyrium subgen. Agyrina Sacc. (1884); Pleolecis Clem. (1909)

= Steinia =

Genus of lichen-forming fungi

Steinia is a genus of lichen-forming fungi in the family Aphanopsidaceae. The genus was established in 1873 by Gustav Wilhelm Körber and contains three recognised species. These lichens grow on disturbed soil and form very thin, powdery crusts that are often barely visible to the naked eye. They produce small, dark brown to black fruiting bodies that contain unusually large numbers of ascospores—up to 16 in each spore-bearing structure.

== Taxonomy ==
The genus Steinia was circumscribed by Gustav Wilhelm Körber in 1873, with Steinia luridescens as its type, and only, species. Körber described the new genus in an article by B. Stein, characterising it by its distinctive spore-bearing structures (apothecia) that lack a proper margin and appear convex from early development. The type was found growing on a high sandy path near a railway embankment behind Obernigk in October 1872. Körber noted that the lichen forms a very thin, somewhat scaly thallus that becomes leathery when dry and barely distinguishable from the surrounding soil. The species produces small, dot-like dark brown to reddish fruiting bodies containing elliptical to globular spores, with what were described as watery tubes (asci) holding numerous spores—up to 16 in a single tube—that lie like small balls.

== Description ==
Steina forms a thin, crust-like thallus that spreads irregularly over the substrate. In most specimens the surface is powdery (leprose) or so poorly developed that the fungus is almost invisible to the naked eye, and there is no distinct prothallus line marking its edge. The photosynthetic partner (photobiont) consists of microscopic, ellipsoidal green algal cells (a chlorococcoid photobiont).

The sexual fruiting bodies are scattered apothecia that sit flush with, or slightly raised above, the thallus. Their discs are convex and range from brown to black; unlike many lichens they lack a rim of thallus tissue. The encasing wall (exciple) may be little more than a trace, or it can be well-developed, in which case it appears opaque and compact. Within each apothecium the spore-bearing layer (hymenium) contains a gelatinous matrix that turns pale blue when stained with iodine (I+). Beneath this lies a pale- to dark-brown hypothecium made of vertically aligned hyphae, clearly distinct from the sparse, unbranched paraphyses that thread through the hymenium.

Asci are produced in sets of sixteen per sac. They are narrow clubs to short cylinders with relatively thin walls and belong to the Aphanopsis structural type. The apex carries a blue-staining dome (tholus) with an indistinct central channel when tested with the potassium-iodide reagent (K/I+). Each ascus releases spherical to very slightly ellipsoidal ascospores that remain single-celled, colourless and thick-walled; no extra outer coat (perispore) is present.

Asexual reproduction occurs in minute black pycnidia embedded in the thallus. These contain elongate, flask-shaped conidiogenous cells that divide successively at their tips (percurrent proliferation) to shed smooth, colourless, ellipsoidal conidia without internal walls. Thin-layer chromatography has detected no secondary metabolites (lichen products) in the genus.

== Ecology ==
Steinia species are ground-dwelling (terricolous) lichens and typically occur on disturbed soils.

== Species ==
Species Fungorum (in the Catalogue of Life) accepts three species of Steinia:

- Steinia australis Kantvilas & P.M.McCarthy (1999)
- Steinia geophana (Nyl.) Stein (1879)
- Steinia luridescens Körb. (1873)
