= Carbonicola =

Carbonicola is the genus name for two groups of organisms and may refer to:

- Carbonicola (bivalve), an extinct genus of bivalves in the family Anthracosiidae
- Carbonicola (lichen), a genus of lichens in the family Carbonicolaceae
