= Alectoria brodoana =

Scientific classification
- Kingdom: Fungi
- Division: Ascomycota
- Class: Lecanoromycetes
- Order: Lecanorales
- Family: Parmeliaceae
- Genus: Alectoria
- Species: A. brodoana

Binomial name
- Alectoria brodoana Essl. (2016)
- Holotype: Cerro la Peña, Mexico

Species of lichen

Alectoria brodoana is a species of corticolous (bark-dwelling), fruticose lichen in the family Parmeliaceae. It was formally described as a new species in 2016 by the American lichenologist Theodore Lee Esslinger. The species epithet brodoana honors the emeritus scientist and lichenologist Irwin M. Brodo.

Found only in Mexico, Alectoria brodoana is restricted to the Trans-Mexican Volcanic Belt in Oaxaca and the southern Sierra Madre Oriental in Veracruz. It typically grows on pine trees in montane habitats at elevations between 2,000 and 3,800 m (6,600 and 12,500 ft).

Alectoria brodoana is identified by the C+ (red) medulla, indicating the presence of olivetoric acid. It is chemically similar to Alectoria mexicana, and has been historically mistaken for this species. It is morphologically similar to the widespread Alectoria lata.
