= Alectoria ochroleucoides =

Scientific classification
- Kingdom: Fungi
- Division: Ascomycota
- Class: Lecanoromycetes
- Order: Lecanorales
- Family: Parmeliaceae
- Genus: Alectoria
- Species: A. ochroleucoides

Binomial name
- Alectoria ochroleucoides Essl. (2016)
- Holotype: Cofre de Perote, Mexico

Species of lichen

Alectoria ochroleucoides is a species of fruticose lichen in the family Parmeliaceae. It was formally described as a new species in 2016 by the American lichenologist Theodore Lee Esslinger. The type specimen was collected by Thomas Hawkes Nash III about 15 km (9.3 mi) southeast of Perote, at an elevation of 4,100 ft (1,200 m), where it was found growing on soil and rocks. It occurs in alpine areas in the states of Puebla and Veracruz in Mexico, and also in the Andes of northern South America at elevations between 3,230 and 4,450 m (10,600 and 14,600 ft). It typically grows on soil and rocks, but has been recorded growing on the bases of shrubs in rare instances.
