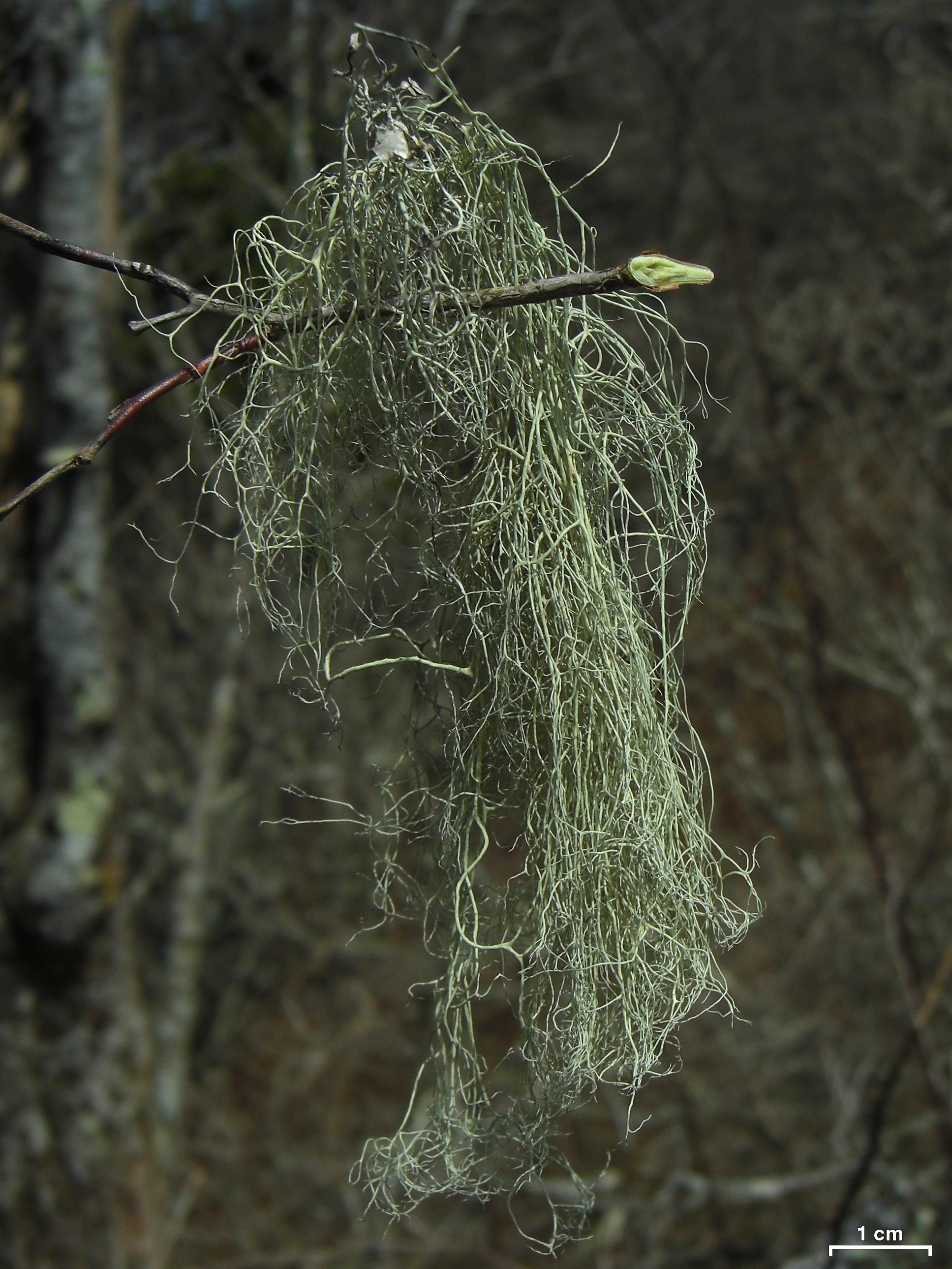

Conservation status
- Endangered (IUCN 3.1)

- Imperiled (NatureServe)

Scientific classification
- Kingdom: Fungi
- Division: Ascomycota
- Class: Lecanoromycetes
- Order: Lecanorales
- Family: Parmeliaceae
- Genus: Alectoria
- Species: A. fallacina

Binomial name
- Alectoria fallacina Motyka (1960)

= Alectoria fallacina =

Species of lichen

Alectoria fallacina, or bubbling witches hair, is a lichen considered as a part of the Alectoria genus with a generation length of 30 years. It is composed of tangled branches that range from gray to greenish yellow. This lichen is endemic to the Appalachian Mountains, and considered endangered as populations continue to decline. Many stressors such as climate change pose a risk to the already declining population of Alectoria fallacina; however, no explicit conservation methods have been put in place.

== Description ==
The body (thallus) of Alectoria fallacina is made of curved and tangled branches that range from a length of 6-8 cm. Its branches are uneven in thickness with a diameter of 0.2–0.4 cm. The fungal portion of this lichen has been observed to occur in a variety of colors ranging from gray to greenish yellow. Its internal structure is made up of a dense cortex and medulla, lending to Alectoria fallacina being resilient compared to species like Bryoria implexa. Additionally, most specimens do not have any apothecia or soralia — both structures commonly found in lichens that allow for asexual reproduction. Instead, Alectoria fallacina reproduces asexually by parts of the thallus fragmenting and dispersing to tree branches closer to the ground.

The fungi secretes usnic acid, which is found only in certain lichens. The secreted acid gives Alectoria fallacina a bitter taste that deters consumption by herbivores and insects.

== Taxonomy ==
Alectoria fallacina is a part of the genus Alectoria in the family Parmeliaceae.

While Alectoria sarmentosa and Alectoria fallacina are similar, molecular insights have distinguished Alectoria fallacina as monophyletic and distantly related to Alectoria sarmentosa. The two species are differentiated mainly by Alectoria fallacina's production of an unknown fatty acid. Also, the two species are allopatric, with their distribution range comprising different areas and habitats, in addition to differences in size.

== Habitat ==
Alectoria fallacina is endemic to forests in cool and high humidity areas of the Appalachians. Specifically, the fungi grows on canopes of mature Abies fraseri (fir), Picea rubens (red spruce), Quercus sp., and rarely on fire cherry trees alongside Appalachian mountains trails.

== Environmental stress ==
Like many lichens endemic to the high-elevation environment of the Appalachians, Alectoria fallacina finds that climate change is a high-threat environmental stress that causes loss of habitat range currently and going into the future. Additionally, controlled and uncontrolled burning within the Southern Appalachian areas greatly contributes to habitat loss in Alectoria fallacina's distribution range. In 2016, a wildfire burned through the area, resulting in further habitat loss. Other environmental stress factors that lead to the decline in populations of the lichen include tourism, logging, competition from non-native species, construction of roads and railroads, and airborne pollutants.

Due to the various environmental stresses, populations of Alectoria fallacina in North Carolina, Tennessee, and West Virginia are in decline. Previously, populations existed in New York and Virginia but have now been deemed extinct.

== Conservation efforts and usage ==
=== Conservation efforts ===
More than 90% of the population exist in protected areas within the Appalachians. While no explicit conservation measures or monitoring have been put in place to preserve and increase the current population, recommendations have been made for the protection of Alectoria fallacina and other rare lichens at the state level.

=== Usage ===
The fungi has mainly been collected from its habitats for scientific research. Like other lichens, Alectoria fallacina can be used to monitor different aspects of the environment such as air quality due to its biology and sensitivity to changes that can occur.

== See also ==
- Mating in fungi
- Lichen morphology
- Lichen growth forms
- Fruticose lichen
- Glossary of lichen terms
