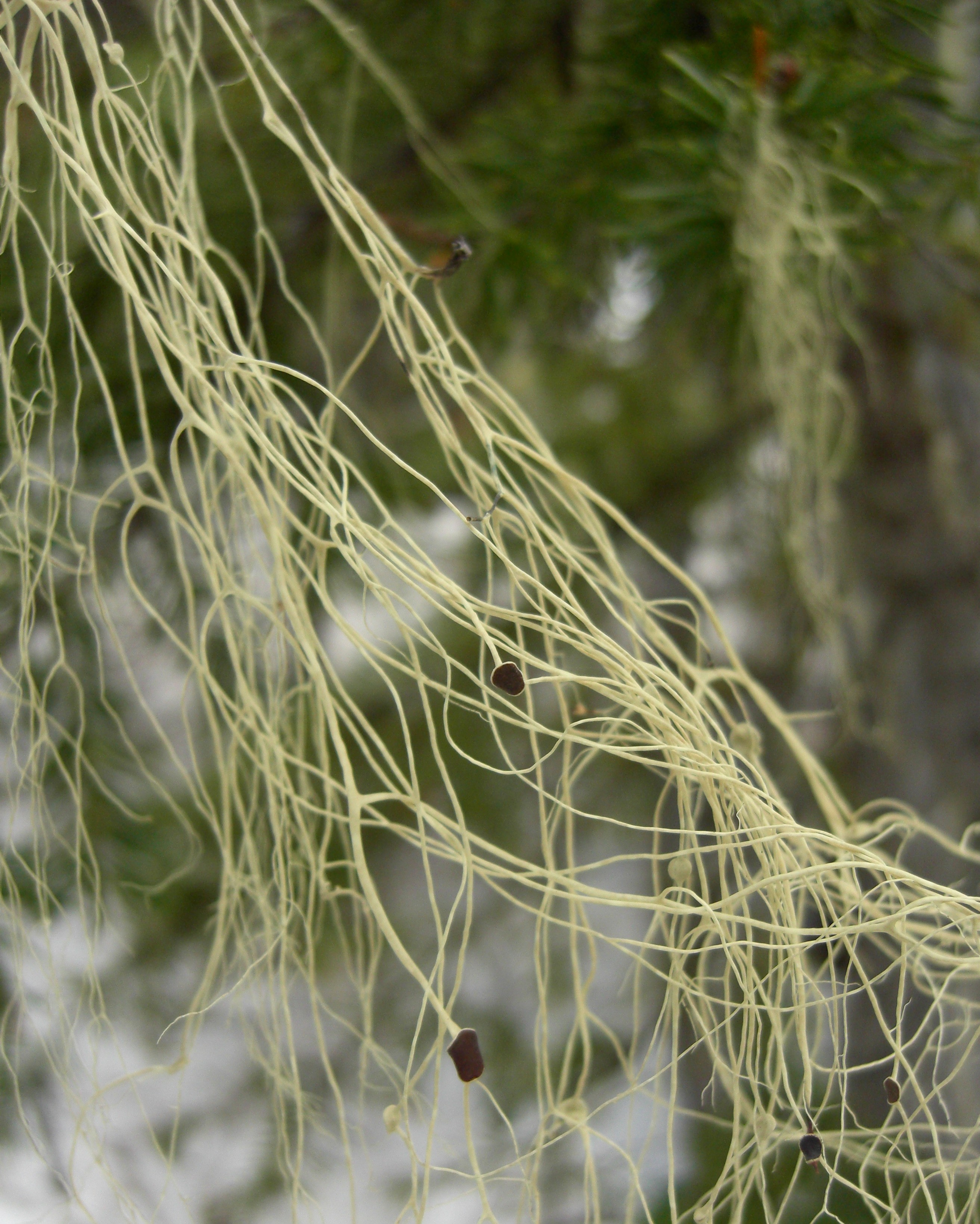
- Alectoria sarmentosa

Scientific classification
- Kingdom: Fungi
- Division: Ascomycota
- Class: Lecanoromycetes
- Order: Lecanorales
- Family: Parmeliaceae
- Genus: Alectoria; Ach. (1809)

Type species
- Alectoria sarmentosa (Ach.) Ach. (1810)

Species
- A. brodoana A. gowardii A. imshaugii A. lata A. mexicana A. ochroleuca A. ochroleucoides A. sarmentosa A. sorediosa A. spiculatosa A. fallacina

= Alectoria (fungus) =

Genus of lichen-forming fungi

Alectoria is a genus of fruticose lichens belonging to the family Parmeliaceae. These lichens form shrub-like growths with slender, branching strands that can hang from trees or grow upright, typically appearing in colours ranging from greenish-yellow to brownish-black. They are commonly found growing on conifer trees in northern forests, where some species like Alectoria sarmentosa can reach lengths of up to a metre or more. The genus serves as an important food source for caribou during winter months, particularly in the inland temperate rainforests of British Columbia, Canada. Alectoria contains about 10 species distributed across North America, Central America, and Asia.

== Taxonomy ==
The genus Alectoria was circumscribed by the Swedish lichenologist Erik Acharius in 1809. Prior to this, filamentous lichens of similar appearance had been classified within the broad genus Lichen, following the system used by Carl Linnaeus in his Species Plantarum (1753). Linnaeus recognised only three species that are now placed in Alectoria treating them as part of a much larger and undifferentiated group of lichens.

During the late 18th century, botanists such as Georg Franz Hoffmann (1796) began distinguishing filamentous lichens as a separate taxonomic group, though they did not establish a dedicated genus for them. Acharius, a student of Linnaeus and one of the pioneers of lichenology, initially placed species now assigned to Alectoria within Parmelia, grouping them under the section Tricharia in his 1803 work Methodus Lichenum. However, as he continued studying the group, he recognised the need for a separate genus and formally established Alectoria in 1809, distinguishing it from Parmelia based on its slender, branching thallus structure.

Following Acharius, lichenologists continued refining the classification of Alectoria. Elias Magnus Fries (1831) provided a more detailed systematic arrangement of lichens, further solidifying Alectoria as a distinct genus. In the mid-19th century, William Nylander (1860) and James Crombie (1876) contributed to the understanding of Alectoria, using both morphological features and chemical analyses to differentiate it from closely related genera. Their work demonstrated that Alectoria species produce unique secondary metabolites, such as usnic acid, which help distinguish them from other lichens in the Parmeliaceae. By the early twentieth century the species-level taxonomy of Alectoria had become highly fragmented, with authors such as Vilmos Gyelnik and Józef Motyka describing numerous narrowly circumscribed species based largely on herbarium material and with little or no use of type specimens or chemical characters. A mid-century reassessment by David L. Hawksworth used thin-layer chromatography of type collections to sort out several of these names, arguing that many of the "new" species represented minor variants within a small number of chemically distinct taxa.

Despite these early classifications, Acharius did not formally designate a type species when he established Alectoria. This omission was later addressed by taxonomists in the 20th century. Veli Räsänen (1919) and Gunnar Degelius (1954) refined the genus's taxonomy, clarifying species boundaries and confirming Alectoria sarmentosa as the type species. These revisions provided a stable framework for the genus, which remains distinguished by its fruticose (shrub-like), filamentous thallus, lack of cyphellae (small pore-like structures), and its characteristic production of usnic acid and other lichen compounds.

Alectoria was previously placed in the family Alectoriaceae, which was widely accepted as distinct from Parmeliaceae based on differences in reproductive structures such as larger asci, pigmented spores, and distinctive hamathecial characteristics. However, a 1999 molecular phylogenetic study examined the relationship between Alectoriaceae and Parmeliaceae using sequences of nuclear ribosomal DNA. Their analysis included specimens of Alectoria ochroleuca and A. sarmentosa along with various members of the Parmeliaceae. The results showed that Alectoria was derived from within the Parmeliaceae, suggesting the two families should be treated as synonyms. While previous taxonomic work had emphasised differences in ascus structure, spore size, and hamathecial characteristics to justify separating Alectoriaceae, the study concluded that these variations represented extremes within a continuous range of characters found in Parmeliaceae rather than distinct family-level differences. The authors recommended including Alectoria within a broader concept of Parmeliaceae rather than maintaining it in a separate family.

== Description ==
Alectoria forms shrub-like (fruticose) growths, which can either stand upright, sprawl along surfaces, or hang down from their substrate. The main body thallus) of these lichens appears in colours ranging from greenish-yellow to brownish-black. Their branches are typically rounded and smooth, though in some cases they may become flattened near their base and where branches meet. One subspecies (Alectoria sarmentosa subsp. vexillifera) is considerably different, having distinctly flattened branches with clear upper and lower surfaces.

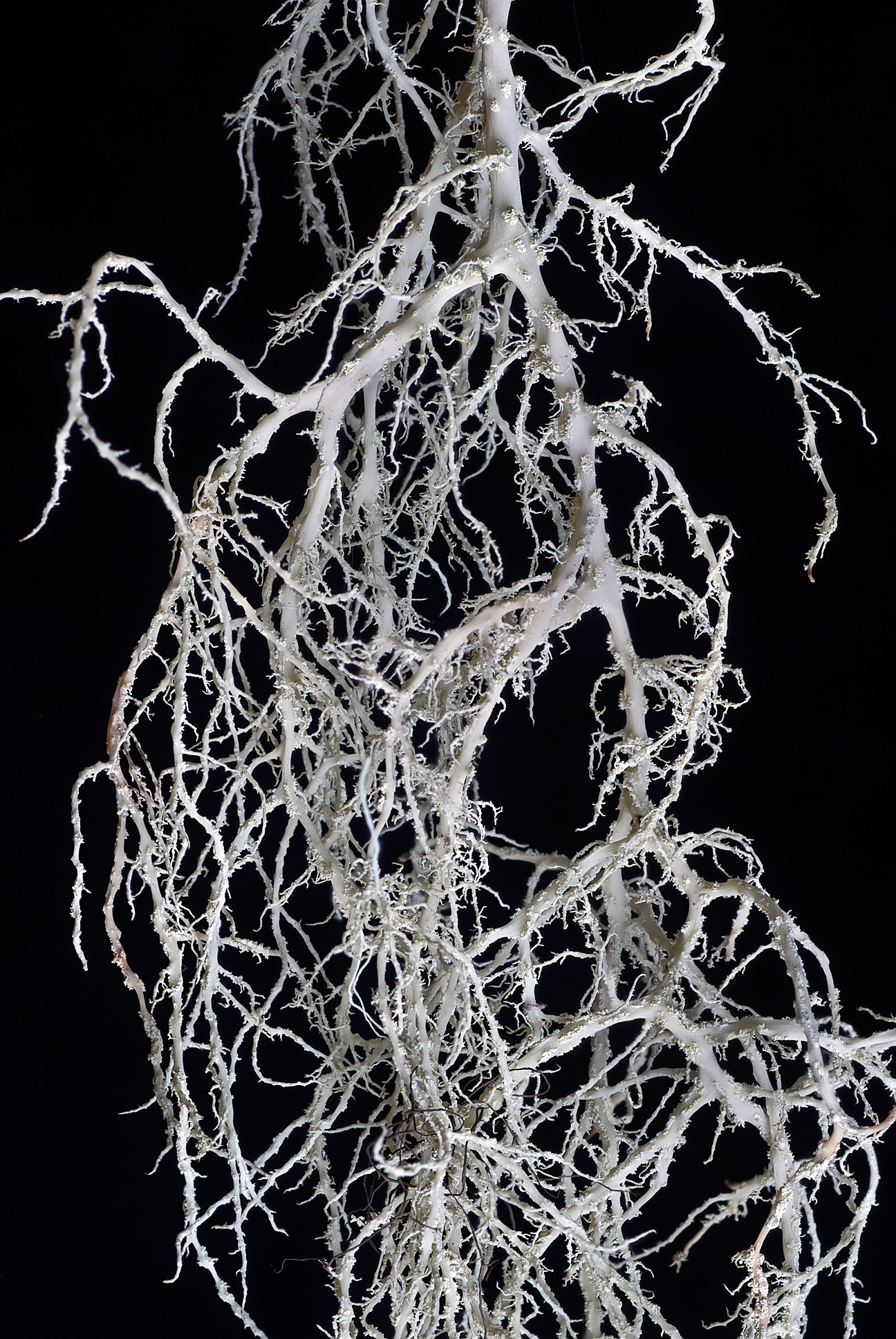
Alectoria imshaugii

A distinctive feature of Alectoria is the presence of white, spindle-shaped structures called pseudocyphellae, which appear as small pores or marks on the surface. These lichens do not produce isidia or soredia, which are specialised propagules for vegetative reproduction. Like most lichens, Alectoria is a partnership between a fungus and an algal partner (photobiont), specifically one from the Trebouxia genus of green algae.

The reproductive structures (apothecia) are rare and appear along the sides of branches. These disc-shaped structures have rims that match the colour of the main body. Inside the apothecia are specialised cells (asci) that produce spores. These thick-walled, club-shaped asci typically contain either two or four spores. The spores themselves are relatively large, single-celled, oval-shaped, and range from colourless to brown, surrounded by a clear outer layer.

The genus also produces small, black, globe-shaped structures called pycnidia that are partially or fully embedded in the thallus. These produce rod-shaped to narrow spindle-shaped asexual reproductive cells called conidia. Chemically, almost all species contain usnic acid, and many produce compounds called orcinol and β-orcinol depsides. Early chemotaxonomic studies showed that species of Alectoria differ consistently in their β-orcinol derivatives: for example, barbatolic acid in A. capillaris, psoromic acid in A. implexa and norstictic acid in A. pseudofuscescens, while A. sarmentosa itself comprises several chemically distinct races with varying combinations of atranorin, alectoronic acid, α-collatolic acid, barbatic acid and usnic acid.

== Ecology ==
Species of Alectoria are pendent "hair" lichens that form long, tough strands on conifer branches; in favourable sites Alectoria sarmentosa can reach lengths of around 30–50 cm (12–20 in), occasionally exceeding a metre. Within the inland temperate rainforests of British Columbia, A. sarmentosa is an important early-winter food for deep-snow mountain caribou, used when other forage is snow-covered and before deep snow lifts the animals to higher parts of the canopy. The genus shows a consistent lower-canopy bias. Physiological studies indicate Alectoria is sensitive to direct sun when dry (its usnic acid cortex is a relatively weak "sunscreen") and benefits from frequent or prolonged wetting; together these tendencies favour partial shade and slower drying. Net carbon gain therefore tends to be highest in the lower canopy, and field measurements show biomass typically peaking about 5–10 m (16–33 ft) above ground.

In vertical "zone" terms, Alectoria largely occupies the band where high-biomass Bryoria suffers periodic die-back (Zone B), so its stand-level loads are generally lower than those of Bryoria, which peaks higher up (Zone C). In very humid areas, however, the Alectoria band can extend well into the mid- and upper canopy and may reach near-hyperabundant levels. Heavy loads typically develop late in succession as the inner, sparsely needled "defoliated cone" expands through the canopy; dispersal is also limited by the species' coarse, high-tensile fragments, which are less easily carried by wind. Litterfall from Alectoria and upper-canopy Bryoria continually re-seeds lower branches and, in winter, deposits edible fragments onto the snow surface—a process described as the "manna effect".

== Species ==
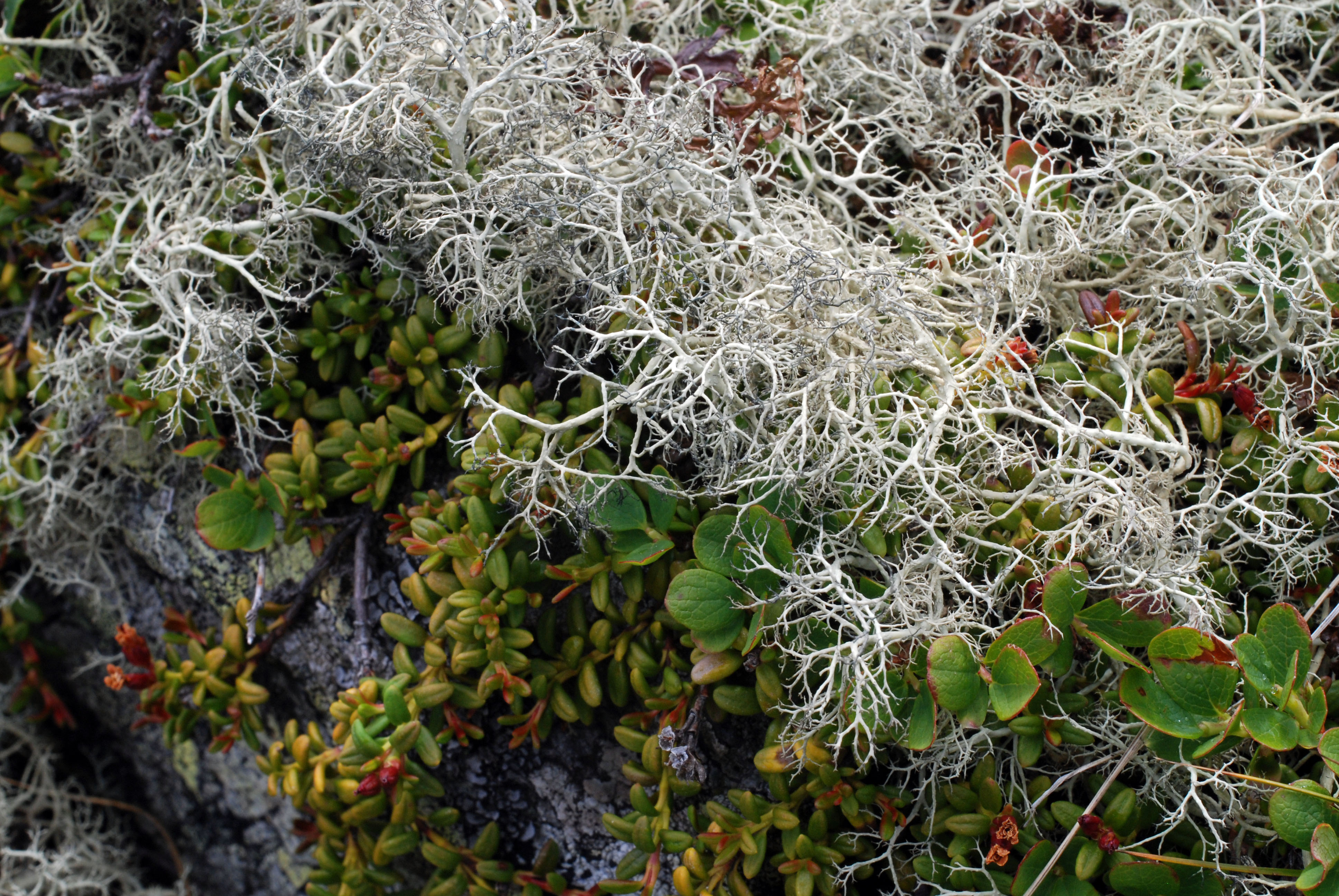
Alectoria ochroleuca

- Alectoria brodoana Essl. (2016) – Mexico
- Alectoria gowardii Lumbsch (2010) – Northwest Territories
- Alectoria imshaugii Brodo & D.Hawksw. (1977)
- Alectoria lata (Taylor) Linds. (1859) – North America; Central America; Asia
- Alectoria mexicana Brodo & D.Hawksw. (1977) – Mexico
- Alectoria ochroleuca (Schrank) A.Massal. (1855)
- Alectoria ochroleucoides Essl. (2016) – Mexico
- Alectoria sarmentosa (Ach.) Ach. (1810)
- Alectoria sorediosa (K.G.W.Lång ex Räs.) McMullin & Lendemer (2016)
- Alectoria spiculatosa Li S.Wang & Xin Y.Wang (2015) – Yunnan, China
- Alectoria fallacina Motyka (1960) – Appalachian Mountains
