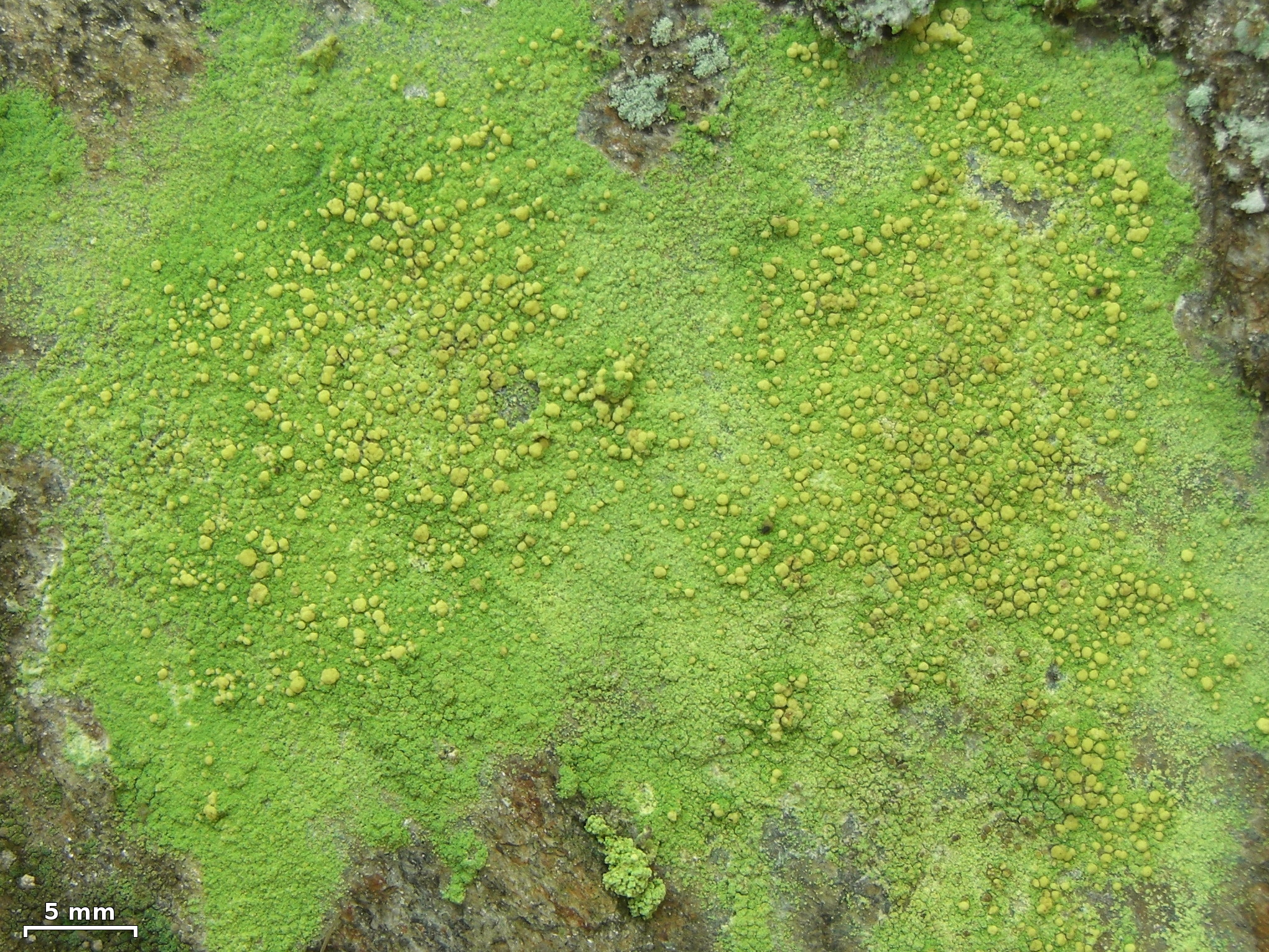

Conservation status
- Apparently Secure (NatureServe)

Scientific classification
- Kingdom: Fungi
- Division: Ascomycota
- Class: Lecanoromycetes
- Order: Lecanorales
- Family: Psilolechiaceae
- Genus: Psilolechia
- Species: P. lucida

Binomial name
- Psilolechia lucida (Ach.) M.Choisy (1949)

Synonyms
- Lichen lucidus Ach. (1799); Lichen peltatus * lucida (Ach.) Lam. (1813); Lecidea lucida (Ach.) Ach. (1803); Patellaria lucida (Ach.) Spreng. (1827); Biatora lucida (Ach.) Fr. (1831); Patellaria theiotea (Ach.) Wallr. (1831)

= Psilolechia lucida =

Species of lichen

Psilolechia lucida is a species of saxicolous lichen in the family Psilolechiaceae. It is widely distributed through the world, where it grows on natural and artificial rocky substrates in the shade, often in sheltered underhangs. It forms a greenish crust on the surface of its substrate.

== Taxonomy ==
It was originally described by lichenologist Erik Acharius in 1799. Maurice Choisy placed it in the genus Psilolechia in 1949. There are known to be two chemical races of P. lucida. The first, which is known all over the world, contains rhizocarpic acid as a major secondary substance as well as some unknown substances. The second, reported only from Australia and New Zealand, has both rhizocarpic acid and zeorin.

== Description ==
Psilolechia lucida forms a sulphur-yellow to yellowish green crust, although the colour is greener when the surface is wet. The crust comprises powdery soredia that can be thin or thick, and sometimes divided into irregular areoles. The apothecia (typically less than 0.3 mm in diameter) are yellow, ranging in shape from hemispherical to irregular and lumpy, and lack margins. The ascospores, which number eight per ascus, measure 4–7 by 1–2.5 μm.

== Habitat and distribution ==
This is a widespread species that is found throughout the world. It is common and widely distributed in Europe. In Asia, Psilolechia lucida has been reported from Japan; from the Middle East is found in Turkey; from Africa, it is known from the Canary Islands, and Madeira. In South America, it has only been reported from Bolivia and Chile. It has also been found in Oceania, Central America, and the Antarctic Peninsula.

It grows on rocks, both calcareous and siliceous, as well as artificial rocky substrates such as bricks and concrete. The lichen grows in the shade, and is often found growing in sheltered underhangs. Rarely, it is found growing on hardwood tree bark, at the base of the tree or on the roots above ground.

== Similar species ==
Chrysothrix flavovirens, the yellow pine dust lichen, is similar in morphology and could be confused with Psilolechia lucida. They differ in their ecology, however: C. flavovirens grows on tree bark, whereas P. lucida is mostly grows on rocks and only sporadically is found as a facultative epiphyte.
