= Aphanopsis =

Scientific classification
- Kingdom: Fungi
- Division: Ascomycota
- Class: Lecanoromycetes
- Order: Lecanorales
- Family: Aphanopsidaceae
- Genus: Aphanopsis; Nyl. (1882)

Type species
- Aphanopsis terrigena (Ach.) J.Lahm (1885)

Species
- A. terrigena A. coenosa

Genus of fungi

Aphanopsis is a genus of lichens in the family Aphanopsidaceae. It was circumscribed by the Finnish lichenologist William Nylander in 1882, with Aphanopsis terrigena as the type species. Aphanopsis coenosa, originally described as Collema coenosum by Erik Acharius in 1810, was added to the genus in 1984.
