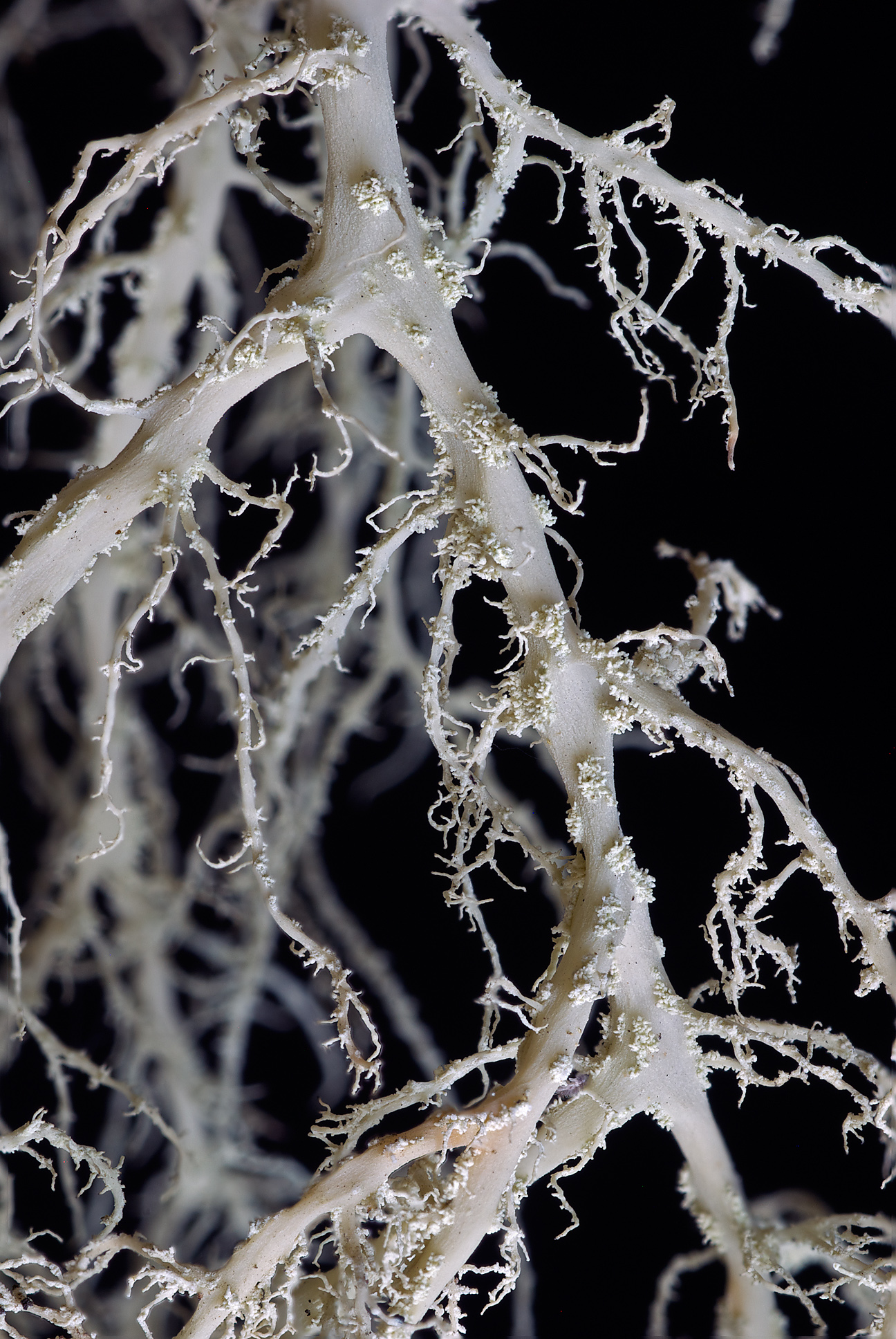
- closeup shows "isidia-like" spinules

Conservation status
- Secure (NatureServe)

Scientific classification
- Domain: Eukaryota
- Kingdom: Fungi
- Division: Ascomycota
- Class: Lecanoromycetes
- Order: Lecanorales
- Family: Parmeliaceae
- Genus: Alectoria
- Species: A. imshaugii

Binomial name
- Alectoria imshaugii Brodo & D.Hawksw. (1977)

= Alectoria imshaugii =

Species of lichen

Alectoria imshaugii, commonly known as spiny witches hair, is a species of fruticose lichen in the family Parmeliaceae that occurs in North America. It was described as a new species by the lichenologists Irwin Brodo and David L. Hawksworth in their 1977 monograph on the genus Alectoria. The species epithet honors Henry Andrew Imshaug. The variety venezuelensis, proposed in 1994, occurs in Venezuela.

The Chinese species Alectoria spiculatosa is somewhat similar in appearance to A. imshaugii, but is distinguished by its characteristic sorediate pseudocyphellae and also by having spinules that grow over soralia.
