= Neopsoromopsis =

Scientific classification
- Kingdom: Fungi
- Division: Ascomycota
- Class: Lecanoromycetes
- Order: Lecanorales
- Genus: Neopsoromopsis; Gyeln. (1940)
- Species: N. argentina

Binomial name
- Neopsoromopsis argentina Gyeln. (1940)

Genus of fungi

Neopsoromopsis is a genus of lichen-forming fungi of uncertain familial placement in the order Lecanorales. The genus is monotypic, containing the single species Neopsoromopsis argentina, found in Argentina. Both the genus and species were described by Hungarian lichenologist Vilmos Kőfaragó-Gyelnik in 1940.
