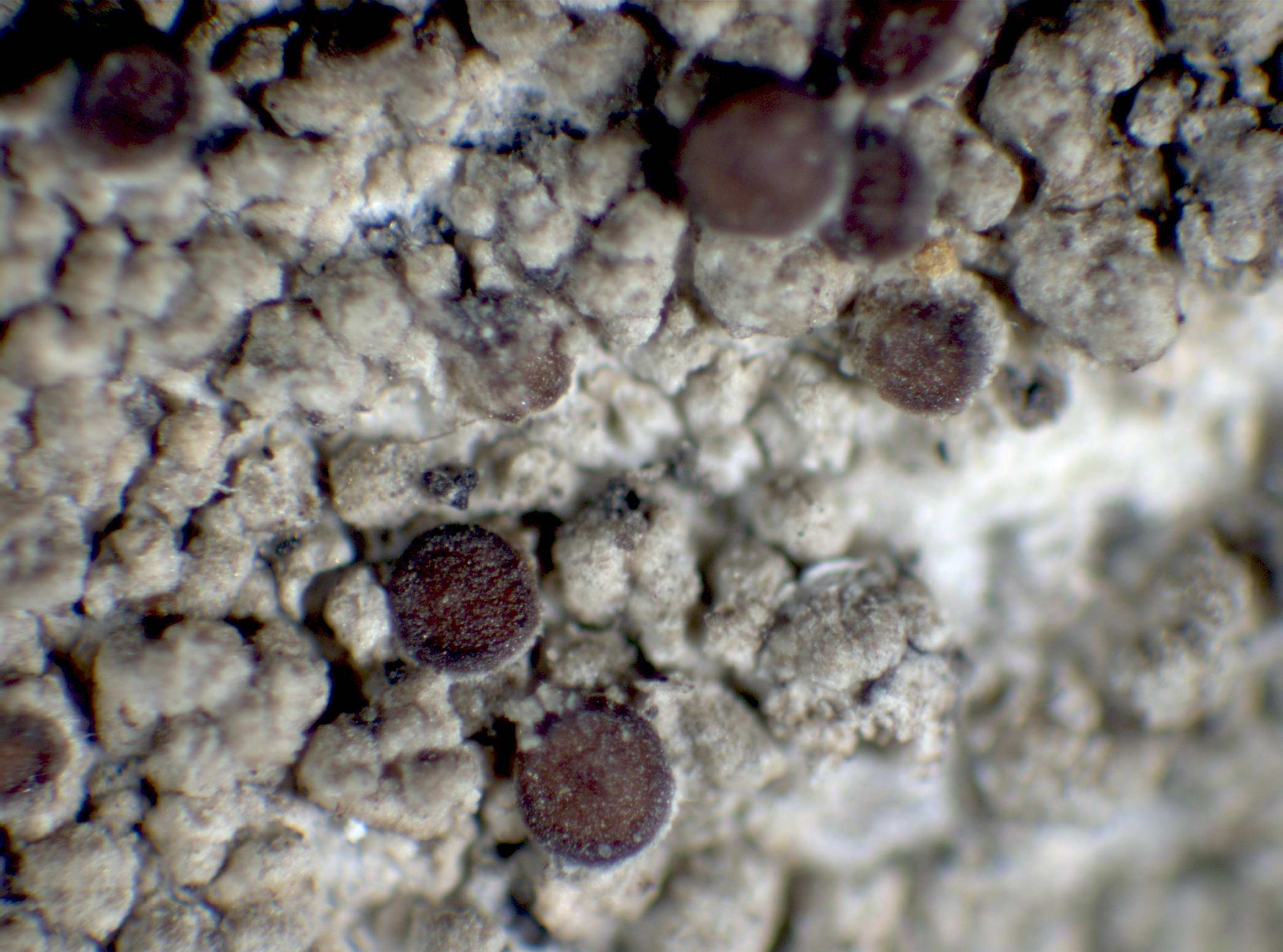
- Myochroidea rufofusca

Scientific classification
- Kingdom: Fungi
- Division: Ascomycota
- Class: Lecanoromycetes
- Order: Lecanorales
- Genus: Myochroidea; Printzen, T.Sprib. & Tønsberg (2008)

Type species
- Myochroidea rufofusca (Anzi) Printzen, T.Sprib. & Tønsberg (2008)

Species
- M. leprosula M. minutula M. porphyrospoda M. rufofusca

= Myochroidea =

Genus of lichens

Myochroidea is a genus of lichen-forming fungi of uncertain familial placement in the order Lecanorales. It has four species of grey or brown-grey crustose lichens.

== Taxonomy ==
The genus was proposed in 2008 by the lichenologists Christian Printzen, Toby Spribille, and Tor Tønsberg, with Myochroidea rufofusca assigned as the type species. This lichen was first described as Biatora rufo-fusca by Martino Anzi in 1860. The name Myochroidea is derived from the Greek word myochrous, which translates to "mouse-coloured." This naming is inspired by the characteristic grey or brown-grey colour of the lichen's body (thallus), reminiscent of the hues found in a mouse's fur.

== Description ==
The thallus of Myochroidea is crust-like and not clearly defined at its edges. It has a texture that can range from wart-like clusters to small, granule-like structures, especially noted in the species M. minutula. These granules are similar in appearance to tiny, angular cysts. The clusters (areoles) can vary in shape from slightly to prominently rounded, sometimes even resembling coral in their complexity. The surface of these lichens is non-glossy, with hues from mouse grey to greyish brown or olive brown, and harbours a trebouxioid (green algal) photobiont.

The reproductive structures (apothecia) of Myochroidea are reddish to blackish brown, and occasionally ochre, in colour. These structures are seated directly on the thallus and may range from flat to significantly rounded, maintaining a matte or slightly shiny appearance. These parts are either not covered in a powdery coating (pruina) or have such a coating so fine that it's only noticeable when moist. The edges of the apothecia are typically slightly raised compared to the central disc, though in older structures, the edges may not be as distinct. The supporting tissue (exciple) surrounding the reproductive discs is either colourless or a pale orange-brown, with the outermost layers blending in colour with the layer above the reproductive cells (epihymenium), composed of strongly gel-like, interweaving and branching fungal filaments. These filaments may be interspersed with small, colourless to pale yellow granules. The underlying tissue layers (hypothecium, subhymenium, and hymenium) are colourless, while the epihymenium may be a pale ochre to brown shade. The filaments (paraphyses) are branched and fuse together, with their tips often brown and slightly enlarged. The spore-producing structures (asci) contain eight spores each and react to iodine by turning dark blue. The spores themselves are simple in form, colourless, and range from spindle-shaped to broadly elliptical.

The structures typically responsible for asexual reproduction (pycnidia) have not been observed in this genus. Chemically, Myochroidea lichens may contain fatty acids, lobaric acid, and xanthones, though some species do not produce any detectable secondary metabolites.

== Similar genera ==
Myochroidea shows a superficial resemblance to the genera Biatora and Japewiella. Despite these surface similarities, these three genera can be distinguished from one another by differences in the structure of their spore-producing sacs (ascus type) and the tissue surrounding the reproductive structures (excipular anatomy). In Myochroidea, the exciple is characterised by densely interwoven fungal threads (hyphae) that have slightly thickened and pigmented ends. Contrastingly, in both Biatora and Japewiella, the hyphae within the exciple are set within a gel-like substance, a feature that is particularly prominent in Japewiella. Moreover, the presence of thickened and pigmented hyphae at the tips, as seen in Myochroidea, is not observed in Biatora.

Additionally, Myochroidea shares the Micarea-type ascus with both Helocarpon and the more recently described Xyleborus, according to Harris and Ladd's 2007 publication. However, Helocarpon is distinct due to its carbonised underlayer (hypothecium) and surrounding tissue (exciple), as well as its lack of thickening at the tips of the excipular hyphae. On the other hand, Xyleborus sets itself apart with a gelatinous exciple that features radiating, lightly branched hyphae and the unique presence of spore-producing structures (sporodochia).

== Species ==
- Myochroidea leprosula (Arnold) Printzen, T.Sprib. & Tønsberg (2008)
- Myochroidea minutula Printzen, T.Sprib. & Tønsberg (2008)
- Myochroidea porphyrospoda (Anzi) Printzen, T.Sprib. & Tønsberg (2008)
- Myochroidea rufofusca (Anzi) Printzen, T.Sprib. & Tønsberg (2008)
