= Psoromella =

Scientific classification
- Kingdom: Fungi
- Division: Ascomycota
- Class: Lecanoromycetes
- Order: Lecanorales
- Family: incertae sedis
- Genus: Psoromella; Gyeln. (1940)

Type species
- Psoromella pampana Gyeln. (1940)

Single-species genus of lichen

Psoromella is a fungal genus of uncertain familial classification in the order Lecanorales. The genus is monotypic, containing the single species Psoromella pampana, a soil-dwelling lichen found in Argentina.

== Taxonomy ==
Both the genus and its species were described by the Hungarian lichenologist Vilmos Kőfaragó-Gyelnik in 1940. The type specimen was collected at an elevation of about 2,200 m (7,200 ft) above sea level in the Pampas region of Argentina by Carl Curt Hosseus. Gyelnik originally classified the genus in the family Parmeliaceae because of its heteromeric thallus structure (having distinct layers) and the arrangement of its internal layers, particularly the position of the algal layer relative to other tissues. The genus is now classified as being of uncertain (incertae sedis) familial position in the order Lecanorales. As of 1016, no molecular sequence data was available for this taxon.

== Description ==
The thallus, which forms the main body of the lichen, has a scaly surface texture with individual scales that take on a somewhat rounded shape, measuring 1–2 mm in diameter. These scales are distinctly concave with edges that curl inward. The upper surface appears smooth and shiny with a waxy or pomaceous (apple-like) appearance, while the underside is pale and opaque. The lichen attaches itself to its soil substrate through fungal threads (hyphae).

In cross-section, the internal structure reveals several distinct layers. The uppermost cortical layer consists of tightly packed fungal cells forming what is known as paraplectenchymatous tissue. Below this lies a dense upper medullary layer, followed by a loose medullary layer containing large air spaces. The lower medullary layer houses the photosynthetic partner in the form of green algal cells. The bottom-most cortical layer shows variation in its development, being reduced or entirely absent in certain areas.

At the time of the original description, the reproductive structures (apothecia) had not been observed. However, the species was known to produce asexual reproductive cells (conidia), which have a characteristic finger-like (dactylococcoid) shape.
