= Coronoplectrum =

Scientific classification
- Kingdom: Fungi
- Division: Ascomycota
- Class: Lecanoromycetes
- Order: Lecanorales
- Family: incertae sedis
- Genus: Coronoplectrum; Brusse (1987)

Type species
- Coronoplectrum namibicum Brusse (1987)

Single-species lichen genus

Coronoplectrum is a single-species genus of unknown familial placement in the order Lecanorales. The only species in the monotypic genus is Coronoplectrum namibicum, a fruticose (bushy), saxicolous (rock-dwelling) lichen found in Namibia. The genus was circumscribed by Franklin Brusse in 1987.
