= Aphanopsidaceae =

Scientific classification
- Kingdom: Fungi
- Division: Ascomycota
- Class: Lecanoromycetes
- Order: Lecanorales
- Family: Aphanopsidaceae; Printzen & Rambold (1995)

Type genus
- Aphanopsis Nyl. ex P.Syd. (1887)

Genera
- Aphanopsis; Steinia

Family of lichen-fungi

Aphanopsidaceae is a family of lichen-forming fungi in the order Lecanorales. It contains the genera Aphanopsis and Steinia, comprising five species. The family was circumscribed in 1995 by the lichenologists Christian Printzen and Gerhard Rambold.

== Description ==
The family Aphanopsidaceae is a group of lichens characterised by their crustose (crust-like) thallus, which is the main body of the lichen. They engage in a mutualistic relationship with a photobiont, specifically a chlorococcoid type, which refers to the spherical green algae that provide the lichen with nutrients through photosynthesis.

The reproductive structures of Aphanopsidaceae, known as ascomata, are apothecioid, resembling small, open cups. These structures are biatorine, meaning they have a reduced or almost invisible margin around the rim. The internal structure of the ascomata includes a network of paraphyses, which are branched and interconnected filaments. These paraphyses are non-amyloid, indicating they do not react to staining with iodine.

The asci, the spore-bearing cells, have thin walls but are distinguished by a distinct apical structure that is strongly amyloid. This apical structure is plug- or tube-shaped and is part of the tholus, the upper part of the ascus. The shape of the asci varies from cylindrical to club-like (clavate). Aphanopsidaceae lichens typically produce 8 to 16 spores per ascus. These ascospores are non-septate, meaning they lack internal divisions, and range in shape from spherical (globose) to broadly oval (ellipsoid). They are clear (hyaline) and do not react to amyloid staining. Additionally, Aphanopsidaceae have conidiomata, which are structures that produce asexual spores called conidia. These conidia are non-septate, ellipsoid in shape, and also hyaline.
