= Lichen morphology =

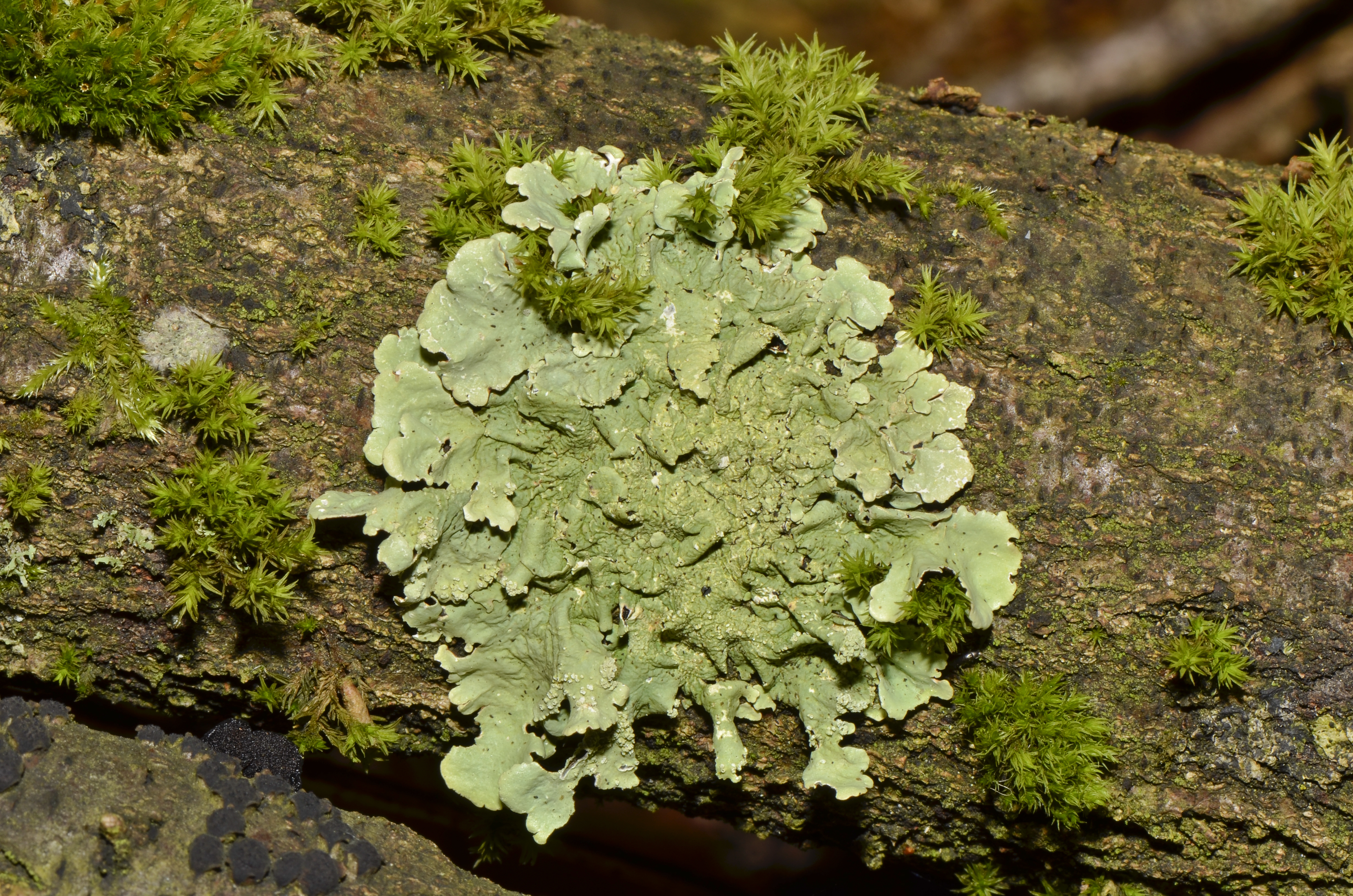
Caperat lichen Flavoparmelia caperata (Parmelia caperata) on a branch of a tree

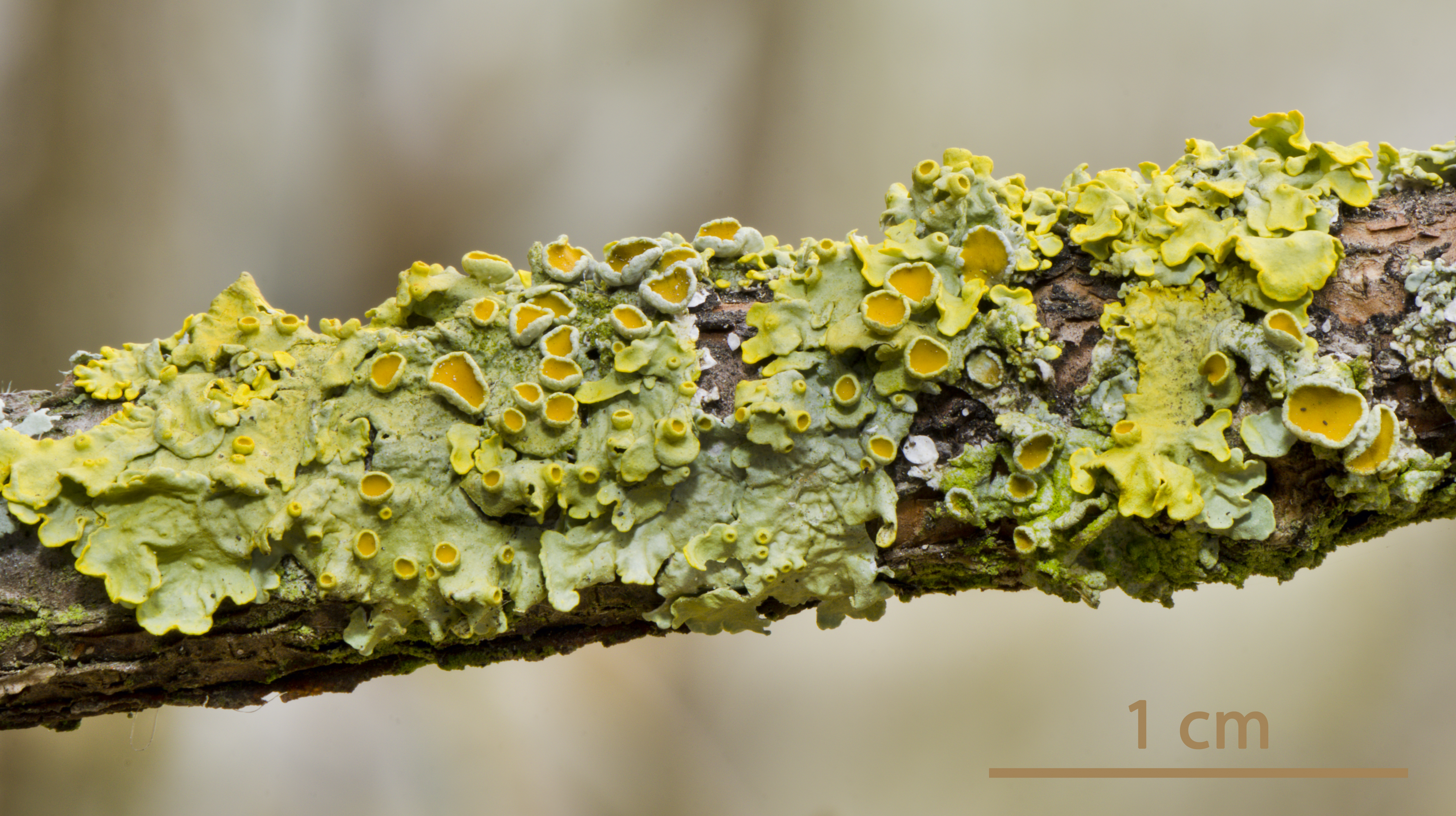
Xanthoria parietina Common orange lichen

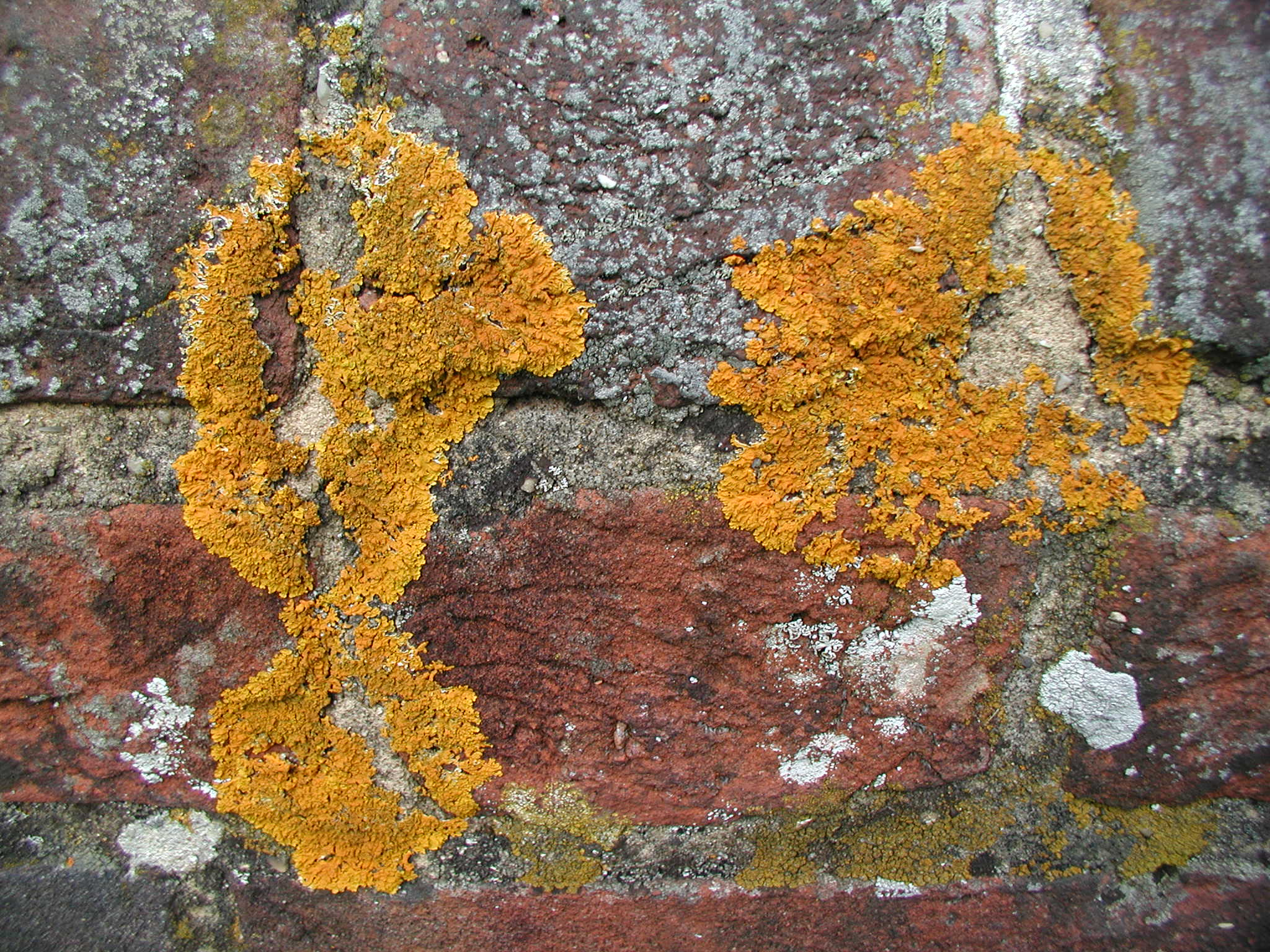
Crustose lichens on a wall

Lichen morphology describes the external appearance and structures of a lichen. These can vary considerably from species to species. Lichen growth forms are used to group lichens by "vegetative" thallus types, and forms of "non-vegetative" reproductive parts. Some lichen thalli have the aspect of leaves (foliose lichens); others cover the substrate like a crust (crustose lichens) (illustration, right), others such as the genus Ramalina adopt shrubby forms (fruticose lichens), and there are gelatinous lichens such as the genus Collema.

Although the form of a lichen is determined by the genetic material of the fungal partner, association with a photobiont is required for the development of that form. When grown in the laboratory in the absence of its photobiont, a lichen fungus develops as an undifferentiated mass of hyphae. If combined with its photobiont under appropriate conditions, its characteristic form emerges, in the process called morphogenesis. In a few remarkable cases, a single lichen fungus can develop into two very different lichen forms when associating with either a green algal or a cyanobacterial symbiont. Quite naturally, these alternative forms were at first considered to be different species, until they were found growing in a conjoined manner.

Under magnification, a section through a typical foliose lichen thallus reveals four layers of interlaced fungal filaments. The uppermost layer is formed by densely agglutinated fungal hyphae building a protective outer layer called the cortex, which can reach several hundred μm in thickness. This cortex may be further topped by an epicortex 0.6-1μm thick in some Parmeliaceae, which may be with or without pores, and is secreted by cells—it is not itself cellular. In lichens that include both green algal and cyanobacterial symbionts, the cyanobacteria may be held on the upper or lower surface in small pustules called cephalodia. Beneath the upper cortex is an algal layer composed of algal cells embedded in rather densely interwoven fungal hyphae. Each cell or group of cells of the photobiont is usually individually wrapped by hyphae, and in some cases penetrated by an haustorium. Beneath this algal layer is a third layer of loosely interwoven fungal hyphae without algal cells. This layer is called the medulla. Beneath the medulla, the bottom surface resembles the upper surface and is called the lower cortex, again consisting of densely packed fungal hyphae. The lower cortex of foliose lichens often bears rootlike fungal structures known as rhizines, which serve to attach the thallus to the substrate on which it grows. Lichens also sometimes contain structures made from fungal metabolites, for example crustose lichens sometimes have a polysaccharide layer in the cortex. Although each lichen thallus generally appears homogeneous, some evidence suggests that the fungal component may consist of more than one genetic individual of that species. This seems to also be true of the photobiont species involved.

== Reproductive structures ==
A podetium (plural podetia) is a lichenized stem-like structure of an apothecium rising from the primary body of the thallus. Since it is part of the reproductive tissue, it is not considered part of the thallus. The podetium may be branched, and sometimes cup-like. It usually bears the pycnidia or apothecia or both.
