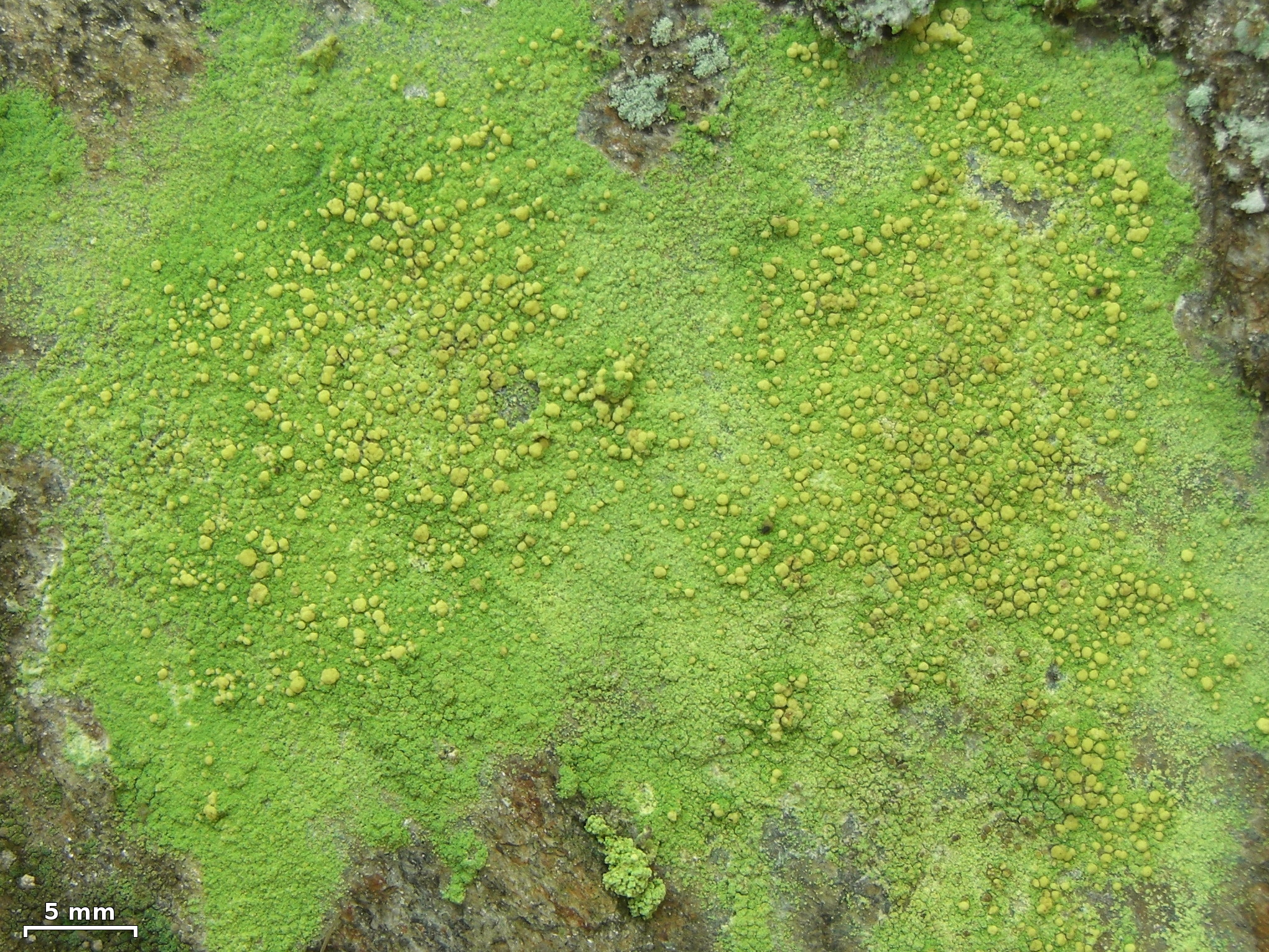
- Psilolechia lucida

Scientific classification
- Kingdom: Fungi
- Division: Ascomycota
- Class: Lecanoromycetes
- Order: Lecanorales
- Family: Psilolechiaceae; S. Stenroos, Miadl. & Lutzoni (2014)
- Genus: Psilolechia; A.Massal. (1860)

Type species
- Psilolechia lucida (Ach.) M.Choisy (1949)

Species
- P. clavulifera; P. leprosa; P. lucida; P. purpurascens

= Psilolechia =

Genus of lichen-forming fungi

Psilolechia is a genus of four species of crustose lichens. It is the only member of Psilolechiaceae, a family that was created in 2014 to contain this genus.

== Taxonomy ==
The genus Psilolechia was established by Abramo Bartolommeo Massalongo in 1860. Formerly classified in the family Pilocarpaceae (now Ectolechiaceae), molecular phylogenetic analysis showed that Psilolechia represented a distinct lineage that deserved placement at the familial level, the Psilolechiaceae, which was formally circumscribed in 2014. This arrangement was accepted in later large-scale updates of fungal classification. Psilolechiaceae is in the order Lecanorales, in the suborder Sphaerophorineae, which also includes the families Ectolechiaceae, Psoraceae, and Ramalinaceae.

== Description ==
Psilolechiaceae is a monogeneric family of crustose lichens with effuse, ecorticate (lacking a cortex), leprose thalli formed by goniocysts (aggregations of photobiont cells surrounded by short-celled hyphae) containing Trebouxia or stichococcoid algae. The apothecia lack a distinct margin, and the asci are 8-spored and have a cylindrical to clavate shape. They feature a central, elongated tube-like structure, and a non-amyloid ascus wall surrounded by a thin outer layer. Both the tube-like structure and the thin outer layer stain dark blue in K/I. Ascospores are oblong-ovoid to tear-shaped, simple (rarely 1-septate in P. leprosa), and hyaline.

== Species ==
Psilolechia contains four species:

- Psilolechia clavulifera (Nyl.) Coppins (1983) – widespread
- Psilolechia leprosa Coppins & Purvis (1987) – north-west Europe; Greenland
- Psilolechia lucida (Ach.) M.Choisy (1949) – widespread
- Psilolechia purpurascens Coppins & Purvis (1987) – Tasmania

Psilolechia species grow in locations that are humid and shaded. P. leprosa tends to grow on mineral-enriched rocks and siliceous rocks, and is often recorded around old mines.
