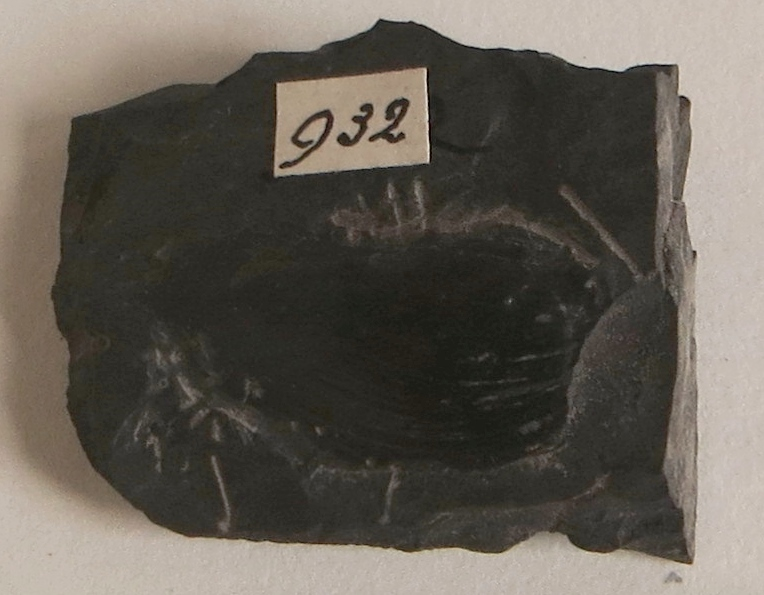
- Carbonicola acuta

Scientific classification
- Kingdom: Animalia
- Phylum: Mollusca
- Class: Bivalvia
- Order: Venerida
- Family: †Anthracosiidae
- Genus: †Carbonicola; MacCoy 1855

Species
- Carbonicola acuta; Carbonicola aquilina; Carbonicola elegans; Carbonicola similis

Synonyms
- Anthracosia King 1856

= Carbonicola (bivalve) =

Carbonicola Temporal range: Bashkirian–Moscovian

Extinct genus of bivalves

Carbonicola is an extinct genus of saltwater clams, marine bivalve mollusks that lived during the Carboniferous period.
