= Lichenosticta =

Scientific classification
- Kingdom: Fungi
- Division: Ascomycota
- Class: Lecanoromycetes
- Order: Lecanorales
- Genus: Lichenosticta; Zopf (1898)

Type species
- Lichenosticta podetiicola Zopf (1898)

Species
- L. alcicorniaria L. dombrovskae L. hoegnabbae L. jurgae L. lecanorae

Genus of fungi

Lichenosticta is a genus of fungi of uncertain familial placement in the order Lecanorales. It has five species. All species are lichenicolous, meaning they are parasitic on lichens.

== Species ==
- Lichenosticta alcicorniaria (Linds.) D.Hawksw. (1980) – host = Cladonia
- Lichenosticta dombrovskae Zhurb. (2010) – host = Stereocaulon
- Lichenosticta hoegnabbae Zhurb. & Pino-Bodas (2015) – host = Cladia
- Lichenosticta jurgae Kukwa & Flakus (2012) – host = Lecanora
- Lichenosticta lecanorae (Vouaux) Brackel & Zhurb. (2015) – host = Lecanora
