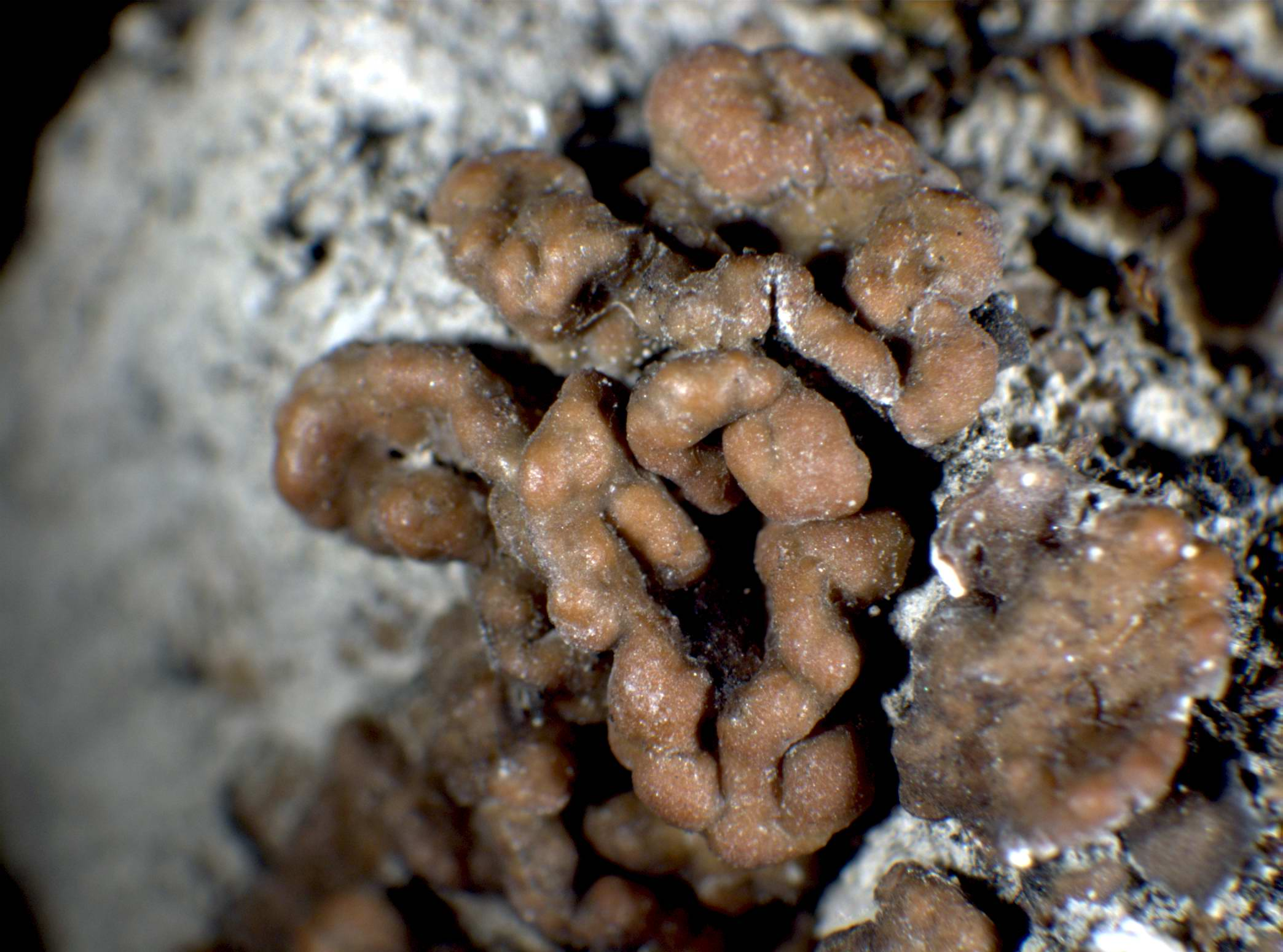
- Gypsoplaca macrophylla

Scientific classification
- Kingdom: Fungi
- Division: Ascomycota
- Class: Lecanoromycetes
- Order: Lecanorales
- Family: Gypsoplacaceae; Timdal (1990)
- Genus: Gypsoplaca; Timdal (1990)

Type species
- Gypsoplaca macrophylla (Zahlbr.) Timdal (1990)

Species
- G. alpina G. blastidiata G. bullata G. macrophylla G. rosulata

= Gypsoplaca =

Genus of lichens

Gypsoplacaceae is a family of lichenized fungi in the order Lecanorales. This is a monotypic family, containing the single genus Gypsoplaca, which has a widespread distribution. The family and genus were described as new in 1990 by Norwegian lichenologist Einar Timdal. Gypsoplaca originally contained only the type species, Gypsoplaca macrophylla, but four species were added to the genus in 2018.

== Species ==
- Gypsoplaca alpina H.X.Shi & Li S.Wang (2018)
- Gypsoplaca blastidiata (Zhurb.) H.X.Shi & Li S.Wang (2018)
- Gypsoplaca bullata H.X.Shi & Li S.Wang (2018)
- Gypsoplaca macrophylla (Zahlbr.) Timdal (1990)
- Gypsoplaca rosulata H.X.Shi, Li S.Wang & Timdal (2018)
