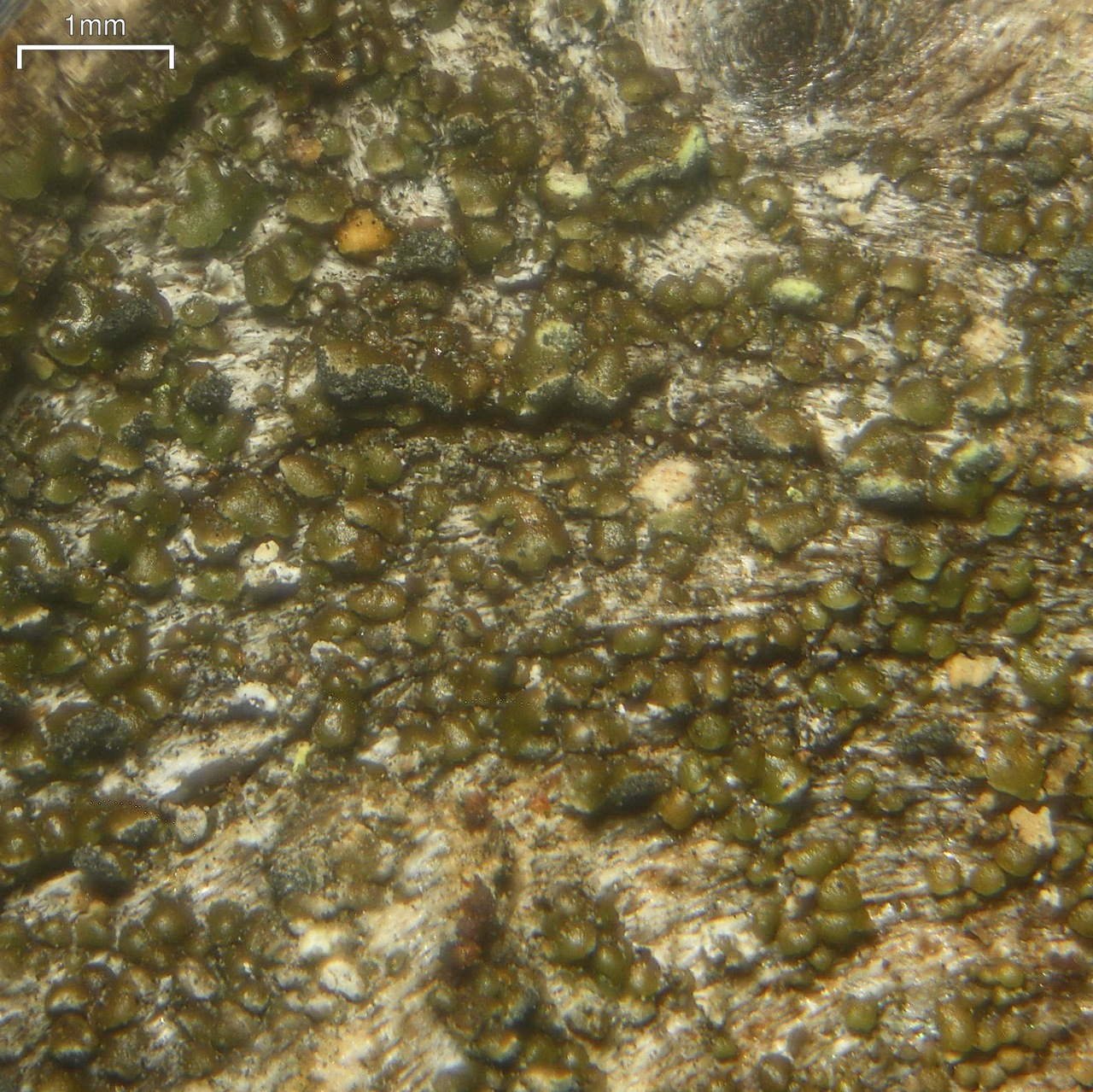
- Thallus of Carbonicola myrmecina, growing on the bark of Pseudotsuga menziesii; magnified 20X

Scientific classification
- Kingdom: Fungi
- Division: Ascomycota
- Class: Lecanoromycetes
- Order: Lecanorales
- Family: Carbonicolaceae; Bendiksby & Timdal (2013)
- Genus: Carbonicola; Bendiksby & Timdal (2013)

Type species
- Carbonicola anthracophila (Nyl.) Bendiksby & Timdal (2013)

Species
- C. anthracophila C. foveata C. myrmecina

= Carbonicola (lichen) =

Genus of lichens

Carbonicola is a small genus of lichen-forming fungi. It is the sole genus in the monogeneric family Carbonicolaceae. The genus, which collectively has an almost cosmopolitan distribution, contains three squamulose lichens that prefer to grow on burned wood in temperate areas of the world.

== Taxonomy ==
Both the genus and the family were circumscribed in 2013 by Mika Bendiksby and Ernst Timdal. In a reassessment of the genus Hypocenomyce, they found that the genus–as then circumscribed–was polyphyletic, dividable into seven clades belonging to different genera, families, orders and even subclasses. Carbonicola includes the three species formerly included in the Hypocenomyce anthracophila group. Using molecular phylogenetic analysis, genus Carbonicola was shown outside to lie outside the Lecanoraceae, in a sister group position to a clade containing the Cladoniaceae and Stereocaulaceae. The generic name Carbonicola combines the Latin roots carbo ("charcoal") and -cola ("dweller") to refer to burned wood, its preferred substrate.

In 2017, Divakar and colleagues proposed to subsume the Carbonicolaceae into the Lecanoraceae, because in their analysis, genus Carbonicola was found to be nested in Lecanora in the broad sense. This synonymy was not accepted in a review published soon afterwards, as the phylogenetic conclusions contradicted the findings of Bendiksby and Timdal, making such a decision premature.

== Description ==
Carbonicola species have a crustose to squamulose thallus. Their photobiont partner is chlorococcoid–spherical, single-celled green algae. The ascomata are in the form of an apothecium, biatorine, with reduced margin. The hamathecium (i.e., hyphae between the asci) is amyloid, and comprises unbranched paraphyses. The asci are semifissitunicate, meaning that the two walls of the ascus do not completely separate during the discharge of the ascospore. Asci, club-shaped (clavate), and have a weakly amyloid apical tholus that contains a darker amyloid, tubular structure. Ascospores number eight per ascus, and lack septa, are ellipsoid, hyaline, and non-amyloid. The conidiomata are in the form of pycnidia; the conidia are non-septate, thread-shaped (filiform), and hyaline. Depsidones are the predominant secondary chemicals found in Carbonicola. These include colensoic acid, 4-O-methylphysodic acid and related compounds, which are found in all species, and fumarprotocetraric and protocetraric acid, which are found in C. anthracophila.

The diagnostic characters of Carbonicolaceae differentiate it from its sister taxa, the Cladoniaceae and the Stereocaulaceae. Unlike those families, which usually form fruticose secondary thalli (a feature absent in the Carbonicolaceae), Carbonicolaceae species form purely crustose to squamulose thalli that are dark brown with a thick, shiny upper cortex.

== Habitat and distribution ==
Typically epiphytic on burnt wood or bark, Carbonicola has a subcosmopolitan distribution, and is found in temperate regions.

== Species ==
- Carbonicola anthracophila (Nyl.) Bendiksby & Timdal (2013)
- Carbonicola foveata (Timdal) Bendiksby & Timdal (2013)
- Carbonicola myrmecina (Ach.) Bendiksby & Timdal (2013)
