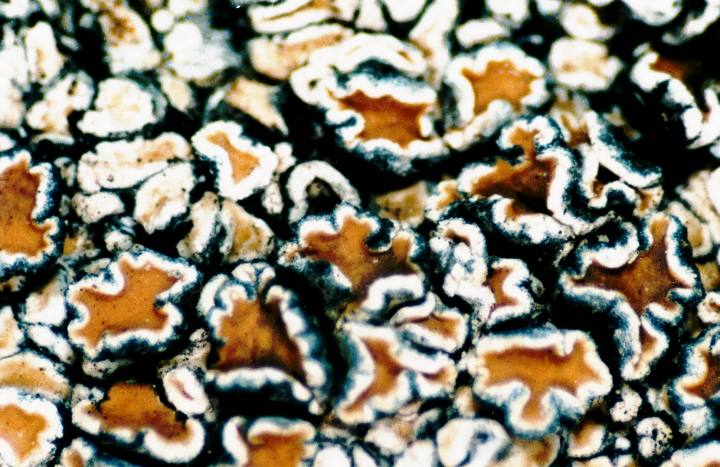
- Lecanora muralis

Scientific classification
- Kingdom: Fungi
- Division: Ascomycota
- Class: Lecanoromycetes
- Subclass: Lecanoromycetidae
- Order: Lecanorales; Nannf. (1932)

Suborder and families
- Lecanorineae; Aphanopsidaceae; Byssolomataceae; Carbonicolaceae; Catillariaceae; Cetradoniaceae; Cladoniaceae; Crocyniaceae; Gypsoplacaceae; Haematommataceae; Lecanoraceae; Malmideaceae; Micareaceae; Parmeliaceae; Porpidiaceae; Psilolechiaceae; Psoraceae; Ramalinaceae; Ramboldiaceae; Sphaerophoraceae; Squamarinaceae; Stereocaulaceae; Tephromelataceae; Lecanorineae incertae sedis; Lichenosticta; Schistophoron; Lecanorales incertae sedis; Biatoridium; Botryolepraria; Corticifraga; Ectolechiaceae; Lopezaria; Psilolechiaceae; Puttea; Stenhammarella

= Lecanorales =

Order of fungi

The Lecanorales are an order of mostly lichen-forming fungi belonging to the class Lecanoromycetes in the division Ascomycota. The order contains 26 families, 269 genera, and 5695 species.

== Families ==
=== Suborder Lecanorineae ===
- Biatorellaceae M. Choisy ex Hafellner & Casares-Porcel, 1992
- Brigantiaeaceae Hafellner & Bellem., 1982
- Bruceomycetaceae Rikkinen & A.R.Schmidt in Rikkinen et al.,
- Byssolomataceae Zahlbr. 1926
- Carbonicolaceae Bendiksby & Timdal (2013)
- Catillariaceae Hafellner, 1984
- Cetradoniaceae J.C. Wei & Ahti 2002
- Cladoniaceae Zenker, J.C. 1827–1829
- Dactylosporaceae Bellem. & Hafellner, 1982
- Gypsoplacaceae Timdal, E. 1990
- Haematommataceae Hafellner, 1984
- Lecanoraceae Fée, A.L.A. 1824
- Malmideaceae Kalb, K., Rivas Plata, E., Lücking, R. & Lumbsch, H.T. 2011
- Pachyascaceae Poelt ex P.M.Kirk, P.F.Cannon & J.C.David, 2001
- Parmeliaceae Berchtold, F.v. & Presl, J.S. 1820
- Ectolechiaceae Zahlbr., 1905
- Porpidiaceae Hertel & Hafellner (1984)
- Psilolechiaceae S. Stenroos, Miądl. & Lutzoni, 2014
- Psoraceae Zahlbr., 1898
- Ramalinaceae C. Agardh, 1821
- Ramboldiaceae S. Stenroos, Miądl. & Lutzoni, 2014
- Scoliciosporaceae Hafellner, 1984
- Sphaerophoraceae Fée, A.L.A. 1824
- Tephromelataceae Hafellner, 1984
- Vezdaeaceae Poelt & Vezda ex J.C. David & D. Hawksw., 1991

=== Incertae sedis or uncertain placement ===
Unplaced families;

- Psilolechiaceae S. Stenroos, Miądl. & Lutzoni, 2014

There are several genera in the Lecanorales that have not been placed with certainty into any family. These are:

- Coronoplectrum Brusse (1987) – 1 sp.
- Ivanpisutia S.Y.Kondr., Lőkös & Hur (2015) – 1 sp.
- Joergensenia Passo, Stenroos & Calvelo (2008) – 1 sp.
- Myochroidea Printzen, T.Sprib. & Tønsberg (2008) – 4 spp.
- Neopsoromopsis Gyeln. (1940) – 1 sp.
- Psoromella Gyeln. (1940) – 1 sp.
- Puttea S.Stenroos & Huhtinen (2009) – 3 spp.
- Ramalea Nyl (1866) – 4 spp.
