= Lecanora subpraesistens =

Scientific classification
- Domain: Eukaryota
- Kingdom: Fungi
- Division: Ascomycota
- Class: Lecanoromycetes
- Order: Lecanorales
- Family: Lecanoraceae
- Genus: Lecanora
- Species: L. subpraesistens

Binomial name
- Lecanora subpraesistens Nayaka, Upreti & Lumbsch (2006)

Species of lichen

Lecanora subpraesistens is a species of corticolous (bark-dwelling) and crustose lichen in the family Lecanoraceae. Found in northern India, it was formally described as a new species in 2006 by Sanjeeva Nayaka, Dalip Kumar Upreti, and H. Thorsten Lumbsch. The type specimen was collected on the southeast side of Gulmarg (Jammu and Kashmir) at an altitude between 2,500 and 2,800 m (8,200 and 9,200 ft); here it was found growing on the bark of a tree trunk. It is only known to occur at the type locality. Characteristic features of the lichen include its pulicaris-type amphithecium, glabrata-type epihymenium, and 16-spored asci. Secondary compounds in the lichen include atranorin, chloroatranorin, and zeorin. The specific epithet refers to its similarity with the species Lecanora praesistens.

== See also ==
- List of Lecanora species
