= Lecanora vainioi =

Scientific classification
- Domain: Eukaryota
- Kingdom: Fungi
- Division: Ascomycota
- Class: Lecanoromycetes
- Order: Lecanorales
- Family: Lecanoraceae
- Genus: Lecanora
- Species: L. vainioi

Binomial name
- Lecanora vainioi Vänskä (1986)

Species of fungus

Lecanora vainioi is a species of crustose lichen in the family Lecanoraceae. It is found in Brazil, where it grows on granitic rocks. It was described as a new species in 1986 by Finnish botanist Heino Vänskä. The epithet vainioi honours lichenologist Edvard Vainio (1853–1929), who did pioneering work on the Brazilian lichens.

== Description ==
The crust-like thallus of Lecanora vainioi ranges in colour from yellowish-white to very pale yellowish grey. The areolae are initially tightly attached (adnate) and cushion-shaped (pulvinate), but later merge so that the crust surface becomes irregularly wrinkled (verrucose) and partly rimose (containing clefts, cracks, or fissures).

Secondary chemicals produced by the lichen include atranorin, epinorin, and zeorin.

== Habitat and distribution ==
Lecanora vainioi grows on siliceous rocks and boulders. It prefers habitats that are near humid coasts, as well as woodland savannah in drier inland regions. It has only been reported from Brazil.

== See also ==
- List of Lecanora species
