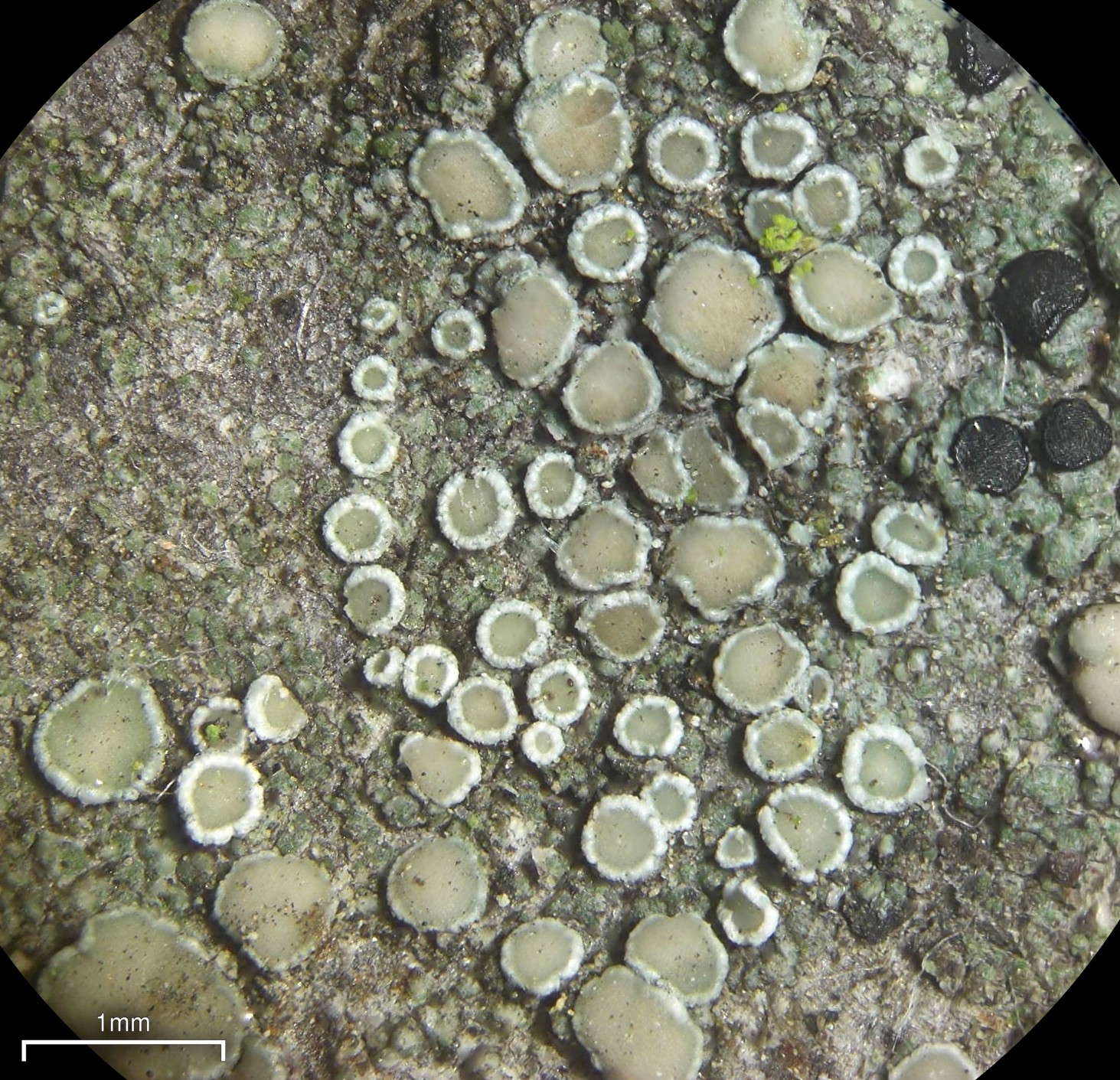

Scientific classification
- Domain: Eukaryota
- Kingdom: Fungi
- Division: Ascomycota
- Class: Lecanoromycetes
- Order: Lecanorales
- Family: Lecanoraceae
- Genus: Lecanora
- Species: L. laxa

Binomial name
- Lecanora laxa (Śliwa & Wetmore) Printzen (2001)

Synonyms
- Lecanora varia subsp. laxa Śliwa & Wetmore (2000)

= Lecanora laxa =

Species of lichen

Lecanora laxa is a species of saxicolous (rock-dwelling), crustose lichen in the family Lecanoraceae.

== See also ==
- List of Lecanora species
