= Lecanora perpruinosa =

Scientific classification
- Domain: Eukaryota
- Kingdom: Fungi
- Division: Ascomycota
- Class: Lecanoromycetes
- Order: Lecanorales
- Family: Lecanoraceae
- Genus: Lecanora
- Species: L. perpruinosa

Binomial name
- Lecanora perpruinosa Fröberg (1989)

Species of lichen

Lecanora perpruinosa is a species of saxicolous (rock-dwelling), crustose lichen in the family Lecanoraceae. It occurs in Northern Europe, Estonia, Turkey, Russia, and Canada, where it grows on calcareous rocks.

== Taxonomy ==
The species was first scientifically described by Lars Fröberg in his 1989 PhD dissertation. The type specimen was collected from a pavement in Sweden. However, the species is not considered to be validly published according to nomenclatural rules: although all of the requirements for valid publication were met by the author, he explicitly stated in his work that the new species was "not formally described here". In 2015, Lucyna Śliwa, Zhao Xin, and H. Thorsten Lumbsch proposed to transfer the taxon to the genus Myriolecis. This new combination is also not valid because the basionym upon which it is based is invalid. Despite the nomenclatural invalidity of the taxon, it continues to be referenced in lichenological literature.

In a molecular phylogenetics analysis, Lecanora perpruinosa was shown to occupy a sister group relationship with a clade of species referred to as the Lecanora dispersa group.

== Description ==
The thallus of Lecanora perpruinosa is superficial, presenting an ash-grey colour. It is thin and displays either a cracked (rimose) or tiled (areolate) pattern, with an indistinct but mostly continuous edge. The apothecia (fruiting bodies) measure 0.3–0.8 mm in diameter. These structures are sessile, meaning they sit directly on the substrate without a stalk. The disc of the apothecia can appear black or near-black, or dark red to brown, and is heavily dusted with a bluish-white powdery coating called pruina. The edges of the apothecia are pronounced or level with the disc and share the same pruinose, colour-matching appearance as the thallus.

The cortex surrounding the apothecia is distinctly paraplechtenchymatous, indicating it is made up of densely interwoven hyphae, providing structural integrity. Unlike some other species in the genus, there are no granules in the epithecium (the uppermost layer of cells in the apothecia). The paraphyses (filamentous structures among the spores) are simple, thick, and bead-like (submoniliform). The ascospores of Lecanora perpruinosa are medium-sized, measuring between 10.5 and 12.0 μm in length and 5.0–7.5 μm in width. This lichen does not produce any secondary metabolites typically found in other lichens.

== Habitat and distribution ==
In addition to Sweden, the country of its original determination, its distribution in Northern Europe also includes Finland, Norway, and Denmark. It also occurs in Estonia, and Turkey. In Russia, it has been recorded from the Ryazan Oblast, the Komi Republic, and the Tver Oblast. In 2000, the lichen was reported growing on limestone cliffs within the Niagara Escarpment Biosphere Reserve in southern Ontario, Canada, marking its first record from North America.

== See also ==
- List of Lecanora species
