= List of Lecanora species =

This is a list of lichens in the genus Lecanora. A 2008 estimate places over 550 species in the genus. As of July 2022, Index Fungorum lists 245 species in the genus, 8 subspecies, 4 varieties and 4 formae.

== A ==
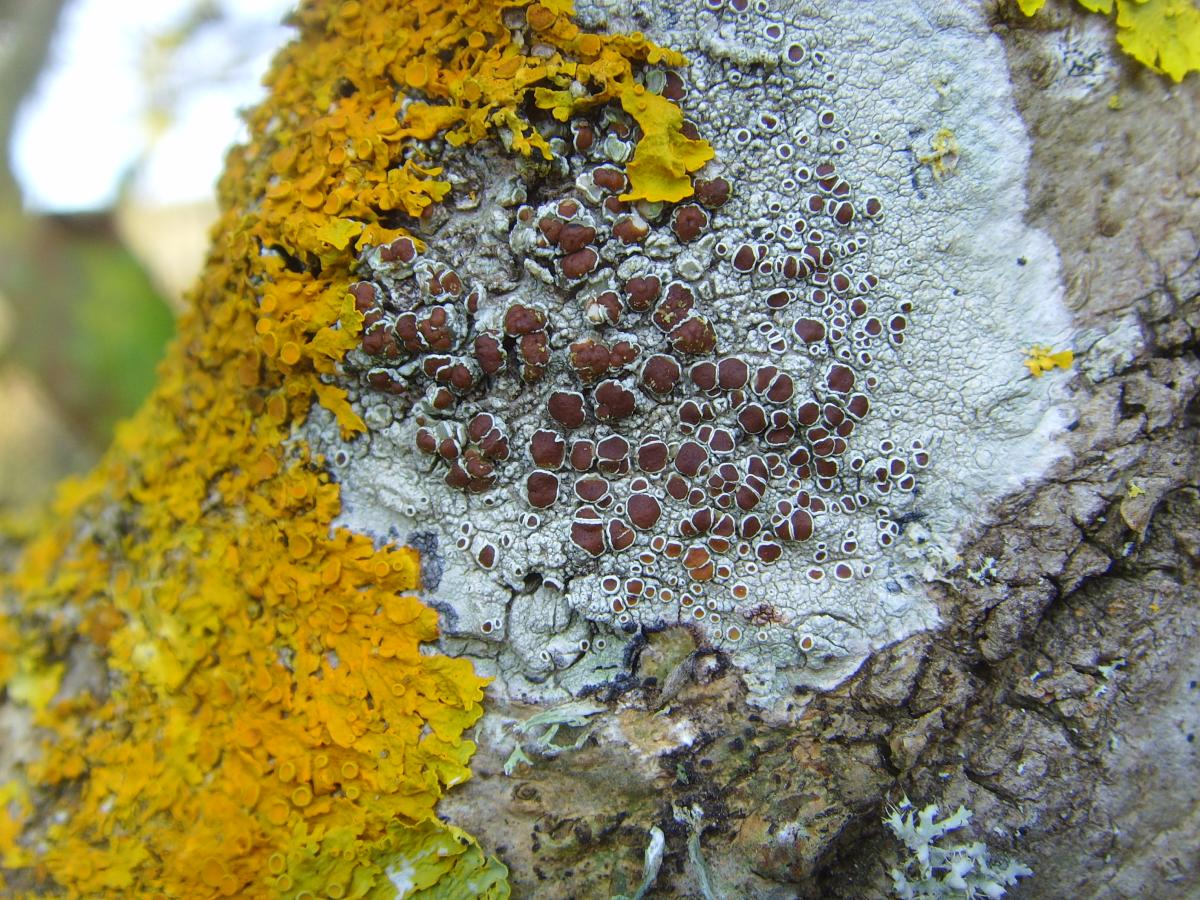
Lecanora argentata

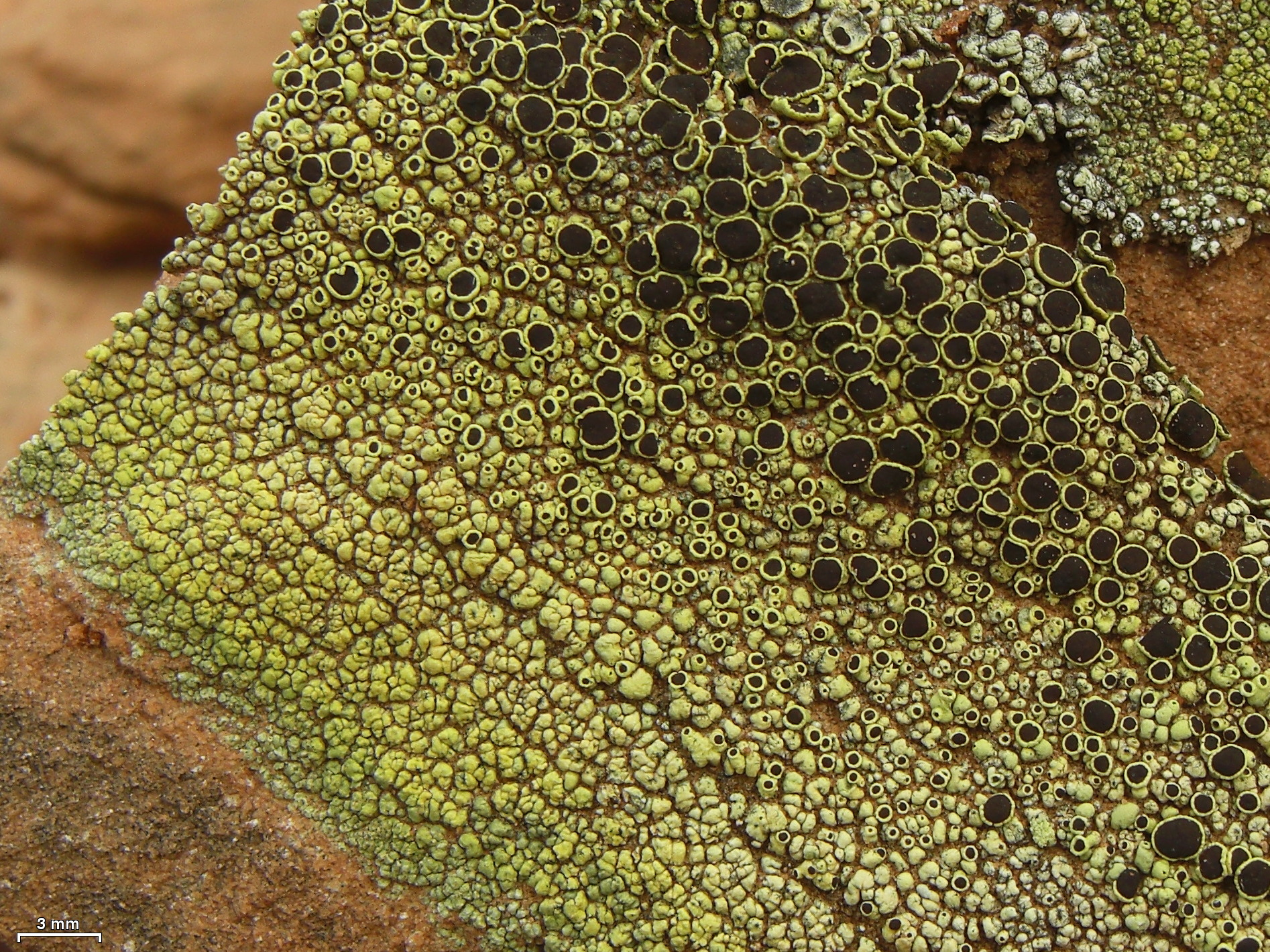
Lecanora argopholis

- Lecanora achroa Nyl. (1876)
- Lecanora achrooides Vainio (1890)
- Lecanora addubitata Krempelh. (1873)
- Lecanora alba Lumbsch (1995) – Australia
- Lecanora albella (Pers.) Ach. (1810)
- Lecanora albellula (Nyl.) Th.Fr. (1871)
- Lecanora albocaesiella B.D.Ryan & T.H.Nash (2004)
- Lecanora alboflavida Taylor (1836)
- Lecanora alpigena (Ach.) Cl.Roux (2011)
- Lecanora andina Räsänen (1939)
- Lecanora annularis Lendemer & K.Knudsen (2014)
- Lecanora appalachensis Lendemer & R.C.Harris (2013)
- Lecanora arachnoidea Vondrák, Malíček & Svoboda (2023) – Europe
- Lecanora arafurensis Lumbsch & Elix (1998) – Australia
- Lecanora arenisaxicola B.D.Ryan & T.H.Nash (2004)
- Lecanora argentata (Ach.) Röhl. (1813)
- Lecanora argentea Oxner & Volkova (1966)
- Lecanora argopholis (Ach.) Ach. (1810)
- Lecanora arnhemica Lumbsch (1994)
- Lecanora arthothelinella Lumbsch (1994)
- Lecanora atrella Jatta (1911)
- Lecanora atroanima Lumbsch (1996)
- Lecanora atromarginata (H.Magn.) Hertel & Rambold (1996)
- Lecanora atroviridis Fée (1873)
- Lecanora austrae-frigidae Øvstedal (2009)
- Lecanora austro-oceanica Hertel & Leuckert (1990)
- Lecanora austrocalcicola Aptroot, L.A.Santos & M.Cáceres (2025)
- Lecanora austrointumescens Lumbsch & Elix (1998) – Australia
- Lecanora austrosorediosa Lumbsch (1999) – Australia
- Lecanora austrotropica Lumbsch (1994)

== B ==
- Lecanora barkmaniana Aptroot & Herk (1999)
- Lecanora beamanii B.D.Ryan (1989)
- Lecanora bicinctoidea Blaha & Grube (2007)
- Lecanora biformis (DC.) Clauzade & Cl.Roux (1985)
- Lecanora bogotana Nyl. (1867)
- Lecanora boligera (Norman ex Th.Fr.) Hedl. (1892)
- Lecanora brasiliana Zahlbr. (1928)
- Lecanora brattiae B.D.Ryan & T.H.Nash (2004)
- Lecanora brodoana Lumbsch & Nash (1995)
- Lecanora brownii C.W.Dodge (1970)
- Lecanora brucei Printzen (2004)
- Lecanora bryospora (Doppelb. & Poelt) Hafellner & Türk (2001)

== C ==
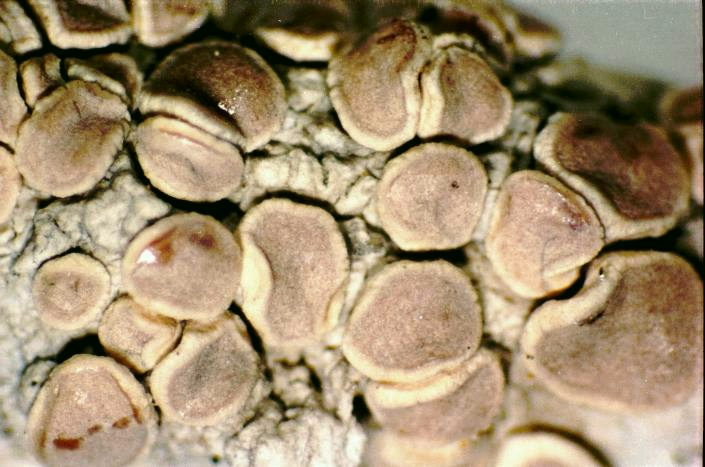
Lecanora caesiorubella

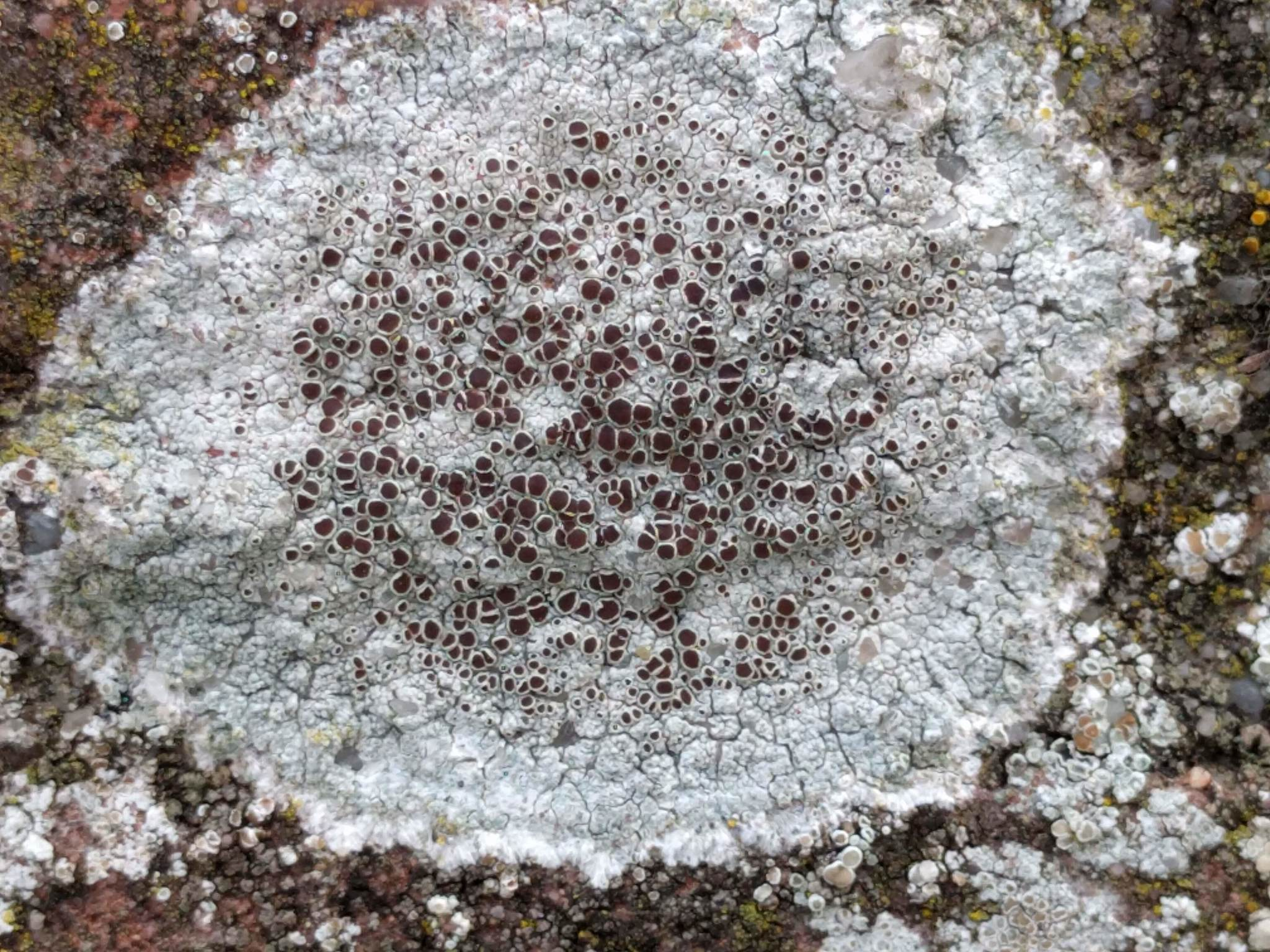
Lecanora campestris

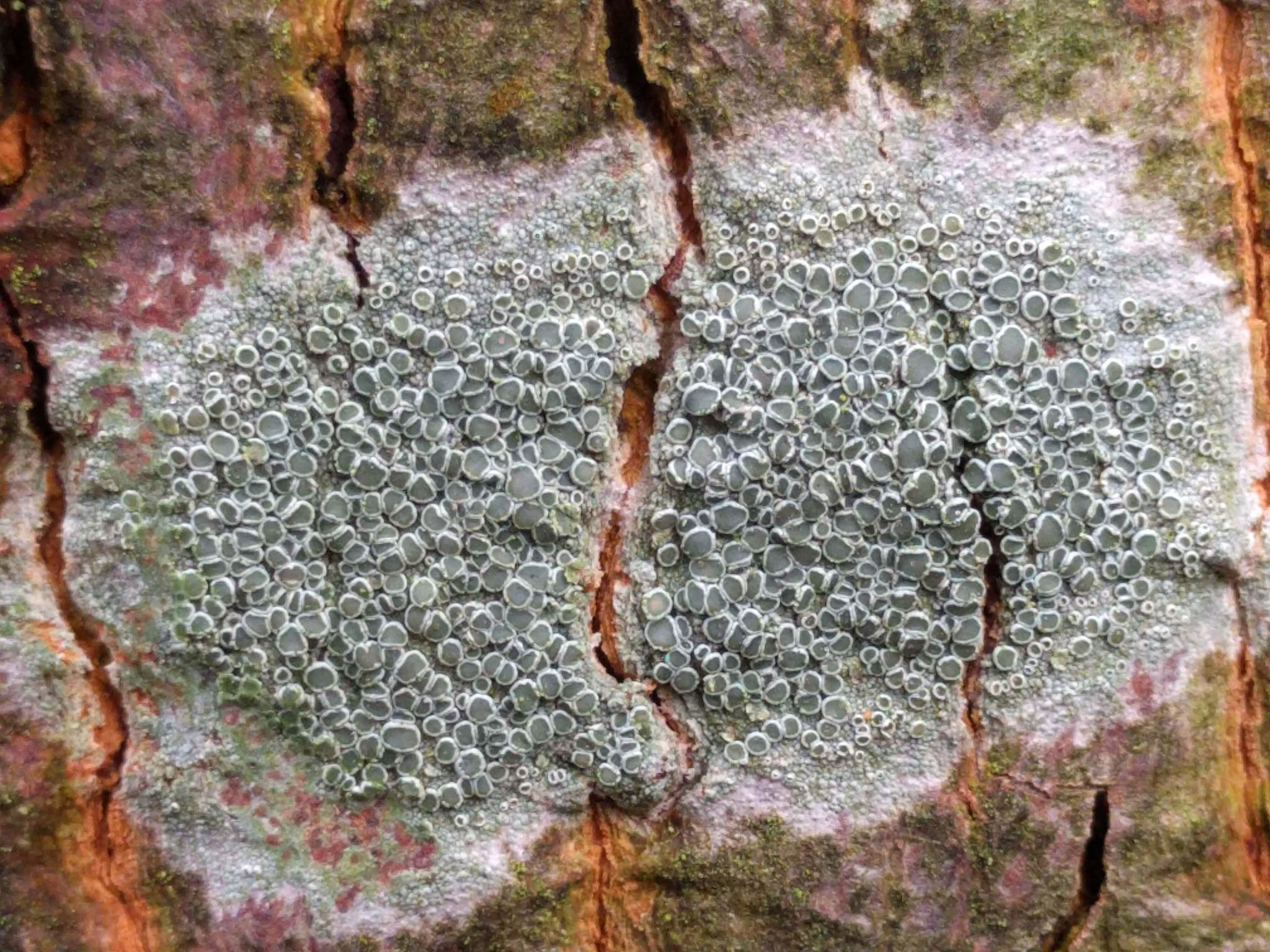
Lecanora chlarotera

- Lecanora cactacea Bungartz & Elix (2020) – Galápagos Islands
- Lecanora cadubriae (A.Massal.) Hedl. (1892)
- Lecanora caesiorubella Ach. (1810)
- Lecanora caesiorugosa B. de.Lesd. (1914)
- Lecanora caesiosora Poelt (1966)
- Lecanora calabrica M.Brand & van den Boom (2008)
- Lecanora californica Brodo (1984)
- Lecanora campestris (Schaer.) Hue (1888)
- Lecanora caperatica O.Asher & Lendemer (2018)
- Lecanora carneolutescens Nyl. (1878)
- Lecanora carpoides Timdal (2001)
- Lecanora casuarinophila Lumbsch (1994)
- Lecanora cenisia Ach. (1810)
- Lecanora cerebriformis Bungartz & Aptroot (2020) – Galápagos Islands
- Lecanora cerebrosorediata Aptroot & Bungartz (2020) – Galápagos Islands
- Lecanora cerradoensis Guderley (1999)
- Lecanora chionocarpoides Lumbsch (1994)
- Lecanora chlarotera Nyl. (1872)
- Lecanora chloroleprosa (Vain.) H.Magn. (1952)
- Lecanora chlorophaeodes Nyl. (1873)
- Lecanora chondroderma Zahlbr. (1930)
- Lecanora cinereofusca H.Magn. (1932)
- Lecanora circumborealis Brodo & Vitik. (1984)
- Lecanora coilocarpa (Ach.) Nyl. (1873)
- Lecanora comonduensis T.Nash & Hertel (1997)
- Lecanora concilianda Vain. (1890)
- Lecanora conferta Grognot (1863)
- Lecanora confusoides Bungartz & Printzen (2020) – Galápagos Islands
- Lecanora coniferarum Printzen (2001)
- Lecanora contractuloides Lumbsch & Elix (1998) – Australia
- Lecanora coppinsii M.Brand & van den Boom (2008)
- Lecanora coppinsiorum Kantvilas (2012)
- Lecanora coronulans Nyl. (1876)
- Lecanora corysta C.Knight (1882)
- Lecanora crassithallina van den Boom (2007)
- Lecanora cryptosinuosa Malíček (2025) – Europe

== D ==
- Lecanora darlingiae Lendemer & E.Tripp (2018)
- Lecanora darwiniana Bungartz & Elix (2020) – Galápagos Islands
- Lecanora demosthenesii Lumbsch & Messuti (2003) – southwestern North America
- Lecanora dispersoareolata (Schaer.) Lamy (1884)
- Lecanora dispersogranulata Szatala (1956)

== E ==
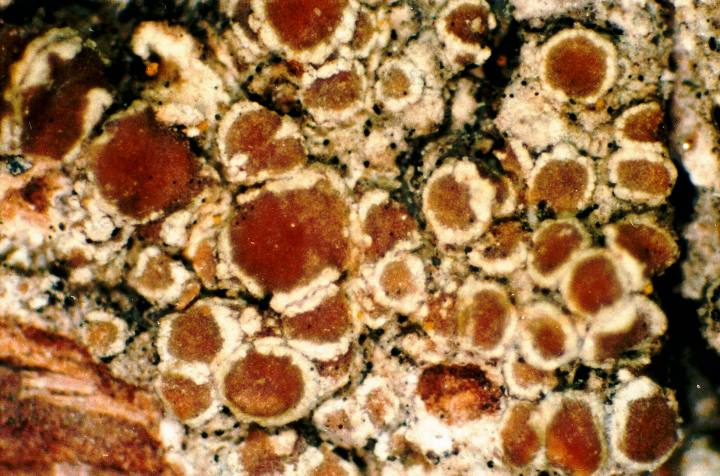
Lecanora expallens

- Lecanora egranulosa Nyl. (1876)
- Lecanora elapheia Stizenb. (1890)
- Lecanora elatinoides Räsänen (1949)
- Lecanora elixii Lumbsch (1994)
- Lecanora emergens Müll.Arg. (1892)
- Lecanora epanora (Ach.) Ach. (1810)
- Lecanora epibryon (Ach.) Ach. (1810)
- Lecanora epirhoda Vain. (1890)

== F ==
- Lecanora farinacea Fée (1825)
- Lecanora farinaria Borrer (1834)
- Lecanora fibrosa Müll.Arg. (1888)
- Lecanora fimbriatula Stirt. (1879)
- Lecanora flavidocarnea Vain. (1898)
- Lecanora flavidofusca Müll.Arg. (1895)
- Lecanora flavidomarginata B.de Lesd. (1914)
- Lecanora flavopallida Stirt. (1875)
- Lecanora flavoviridis Kremp. (1873)
- Lecanora floridula Lumbsch (1995) – Florida
- Lecanora flotoviana Spreng. (1820)
- Lecanora fluoroxylina Aptroot & M.F.Souza (2021) – Brazil
- Lecanora formosa (Bagl. & Carestia) Knoph & Leuckert (2000)
- Lecanora formosula Lumbsch (1995) – Australasia
- Lecanora frustulosa (Dicks.) Ach. (1810)
- Lecanora fuscescens (Sommerf.) Nyl. (1873)
- Lecanora fuscobrunnea Dodge & Baker (1938)
- Lecanora fuscococcinea Nyl. (1859)

== G ==
- Lecanora galactiniza Nyl. (1876)
- Lecanora gangaleoides Nyl. (1872)
- Lecanora gansuensis L.Lü & H.Y.Wang (2013)
- Lecanora geophila (Th.Fr.) Poelt (1986)
- Lecanora girigangaensis Papong, Nayaka & Lumbsch (2012) – India
- Lecanora gisleriana Müll.Arg. (1874)
- Lecanora glabrata (Ach.) Malme (1932)
- Lecanora gongensiana H.Miyaw. (1988)
- Lecanora griseofulva Elix & Øvstedal (2004)
- Lecanora guatemalensis Guderley (1999)
- Lecanora guderleyi Lumbsch & Messuti (2003) – southwestern North America

== H ==
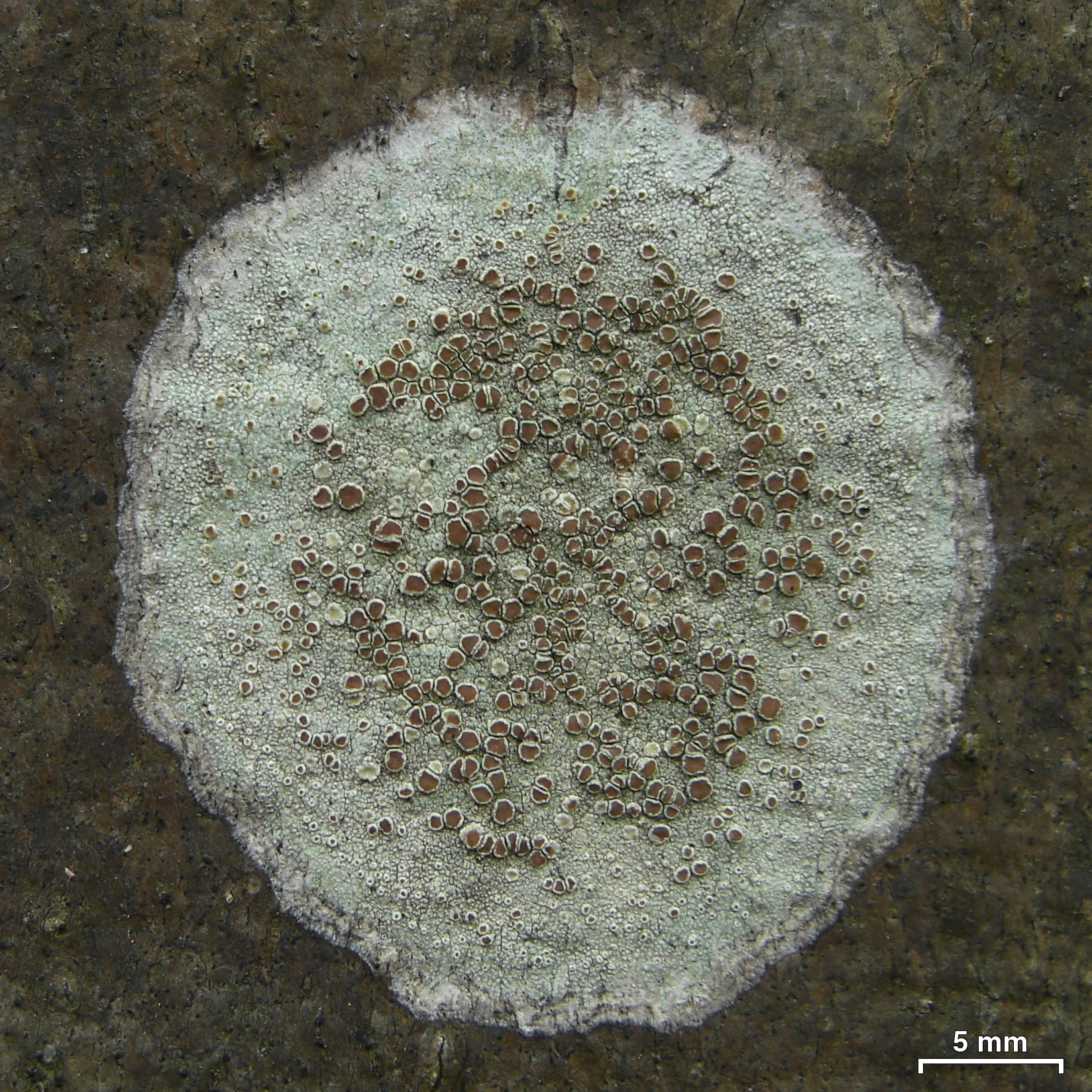
Lecanora hybocarpa

- Lecanora hafelliana L.Lü, Y.Joshi & Hur (2011) – South Korea
- Lecanora handelii J.Steiner (1909)
- Lecanora helicopis (Wahlenb.) Ach. (1814)
- Lecanora helva Stizenb. (1890)
- Lecanora herteliana Calat. & Barreno (2000)
- Lecanora horiza (Ach.) Röhl. (1813)
- Lecanora hyalinescens Müll.Arg. (1882)
- Lecanora hybocarpa (Tuck.) Brodo (1984)
- Lecanora hypocrocinoides Lumbsch (1996)
- Lecanora hypofusca Aptroot & M.Cáceres (2018)
- Lecanora hypoptella (Nyl.) Grummann (1963)

== I ==
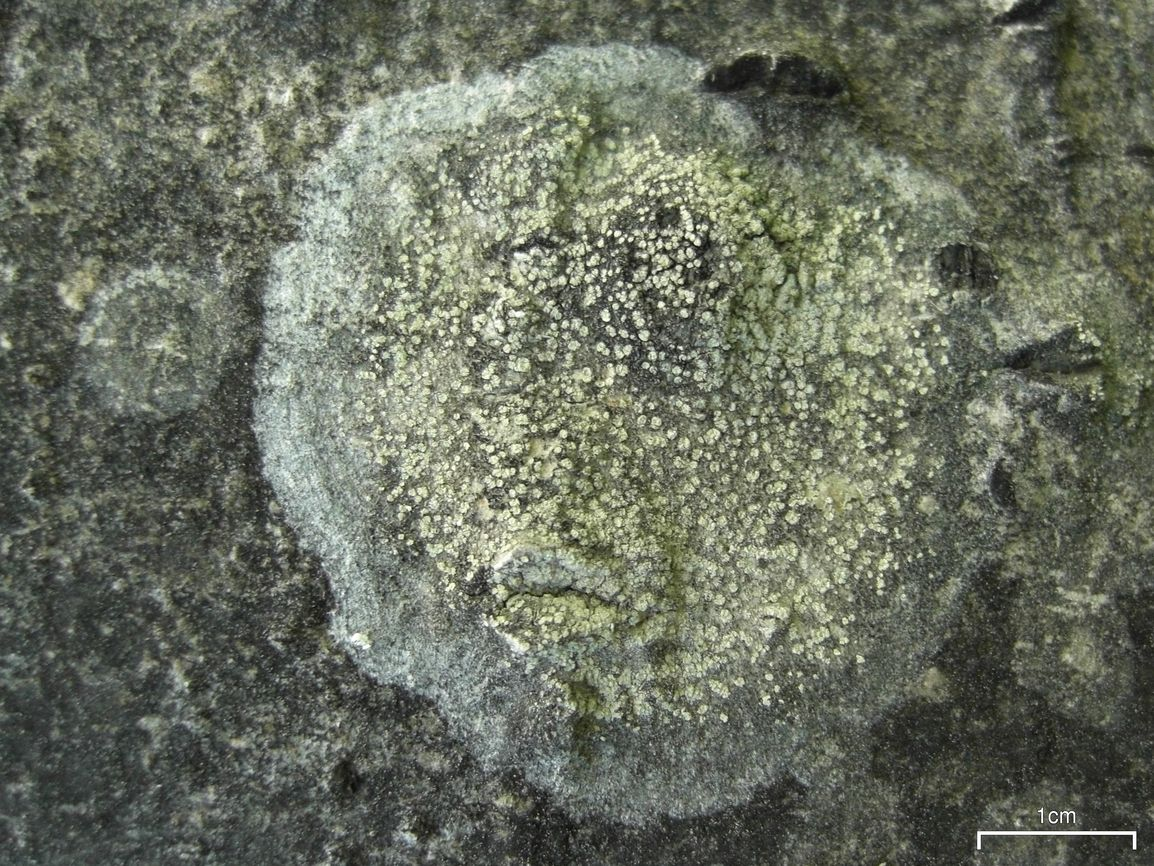
Lecanora impudens

- Lecanora imperfecta (Müll.Arg.) Zahlbr. (1928)
- Lecanora impressa (Kremp.) Zahlbr. (1928)
- Lecanora impudens Degel. (1944)
- Lecanora inaurata C.A.Morse & Ladd (2016) – United States
- Lecanora interjecta Müll.Arg. (1891)
- Lecanora intricata (Ach.) Ach. (1810)
- Lecanora intumescens (Rebent.) Rabenh. (1845)
- Lecanora isidiotyla Vain. (1913)

== J ==
- Lecanora jamesii J.R.Laundon (1963) – Europe

== K ==
- Lecanora kalbiana Lumbsch (1996)
- Lecanora kalbii Bungartz & Elix (2020) – Galápagos Islands
- Lecanora kansriae Papong & Lumbsch (2011)
- Lecanora kenyana Kirika & Lumbsch (2012) – Africa
- Lecanora kohu Printzen, Blanchon, Fryday & de Lange (2017) – New Zealand
- Lecanora kurokawae Shiba, K.H.Moon & Kashiw. (2008)

== L ==
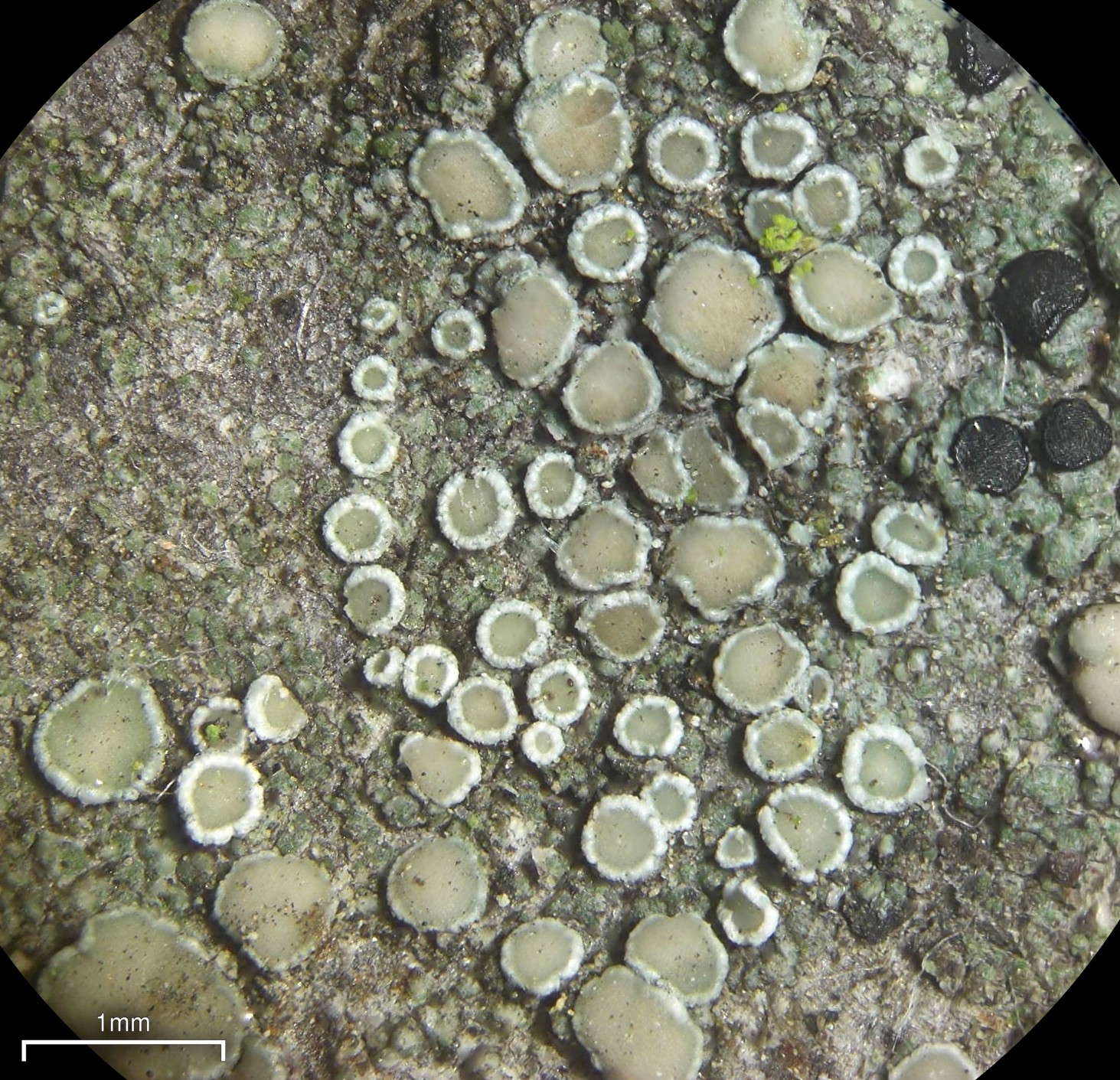
Lecanora laxa

- Lecanora labiosa Stizenb. (1890)
- Lecanora lacteola Müll.Arg. (1893)
- Lecanora lasalliae Pérez-Ort. & Etayo (2008)
- Lecanora latens Printzen (2001)
- Lecanora latro Poelt (1962)
- Lecanora laxa (Śliwa & Wetmore) Printzen (2001)
- Lecanora layana Lendemer (2015)
- Lecanora lecideopsis Cl.Roux & C.Coste (2019) – France
- Lecanora legalloana Elix & Øvstedal (2007)
- Lecanora lendemeri E.Tripp & C.A.Morse (2019)
- Lecanora leproplaca Zahlbr. (1944)
- Lecanora leprosa Fée (1825)
- Lecanora leptacina Sommerf. (1826)
- Lecanora leptacinella Nyl. (1873)
- Lecanora lichexanthona Guderley (2000) – South America
- Lecanora lichexanthoxylina Aptroot & M.F.Souza (2021) – Brazil
- Lecanora lividocarnea Vain. (1913)
- Lecanora lividocinerea Bagl. (1879)
- Lecanora loekoesii L.Lü, Y.Joshi & Hur (2011) – South Korea
- Lecanora lojkahugoi S.Y.Kondr., Lőkös & Hur (2015)
- Lecanora louisianae B.de Lesd. 1932
- Lecanora lugubris Deschâtres & Werner (1971)
- Lecanora luteomarginata Nayaka, Upreti & Lumbsch (2006)

== M ==
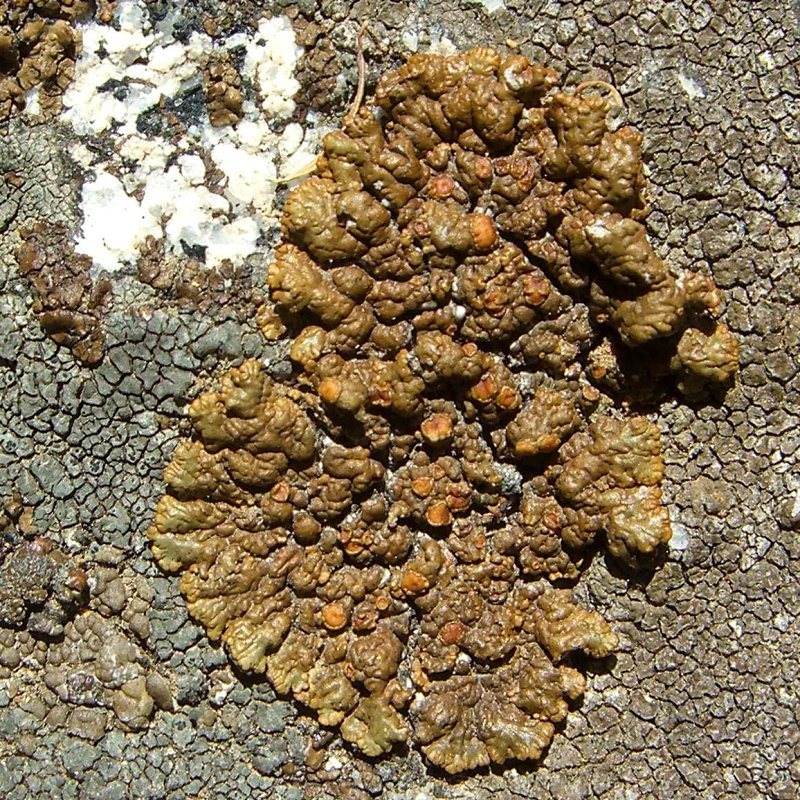
Lecanora mellea

- Lecanora macaronesica Malíček (2025) – Canary Islands
- Lecanora magnussoniana Hafellner & Türk (2001)
- Lecanora malagae Bungartz & Elix (2020) – Galápagos Islands
- Lecanora margaritula Zahlbr. (1944)
- Lecanora margarodes (Körb.) Nyl. (1864)
- Lecanora marginata (Schaer.) Hertel & Rambold (1985)
- Lecanora markjohnstonii And.Stewart, E.Tripp & Lendemer (2018) – United States
- Lecanora masana Lendemer & R.C.Harris (2013)
- Lecanora maxima Lynge (1937)
- Lecanora mayrhoferi Lumbsch (1994)
- Lecanora melacarpella Müll.Arg. (1895)
- Lecanora melaleuca (Müll.Arg.) C.W.Dodge 1971)
- Lecanora melanommata C.Knight (1886)
- Lecanora mellea W.A.Weber (1975)
- Lecanora merrillii Vain. (1913)
- Lecanora meridionalis H.Magn. (1932)
- Lecanora microloba Śliwa & Flakus (2010) – Poland
- Lecanora microphaea Zahlbr. (1930)
- Lecanora mikuraensis Miyaw. (1988)
- Lecanora mobergiana Lumbsch & Elix (1998) – Australia
- Lecanora mosigiicola (Eitner) Hertel & Rambold (1992)
- Lecanora mugambii Kirika, I.Schmitt, Fankhauser & Lumbsch (2011)
- Lecanora mughicola Nyl. (1872)
- Lecanora mundula Stirt. (1881)
- Lecanora munzii K.Knudsen & Lendemer (2009)
- Lecanora muscigena Øvstedal & Fryday (2020) – South Georgia Island

== N ==
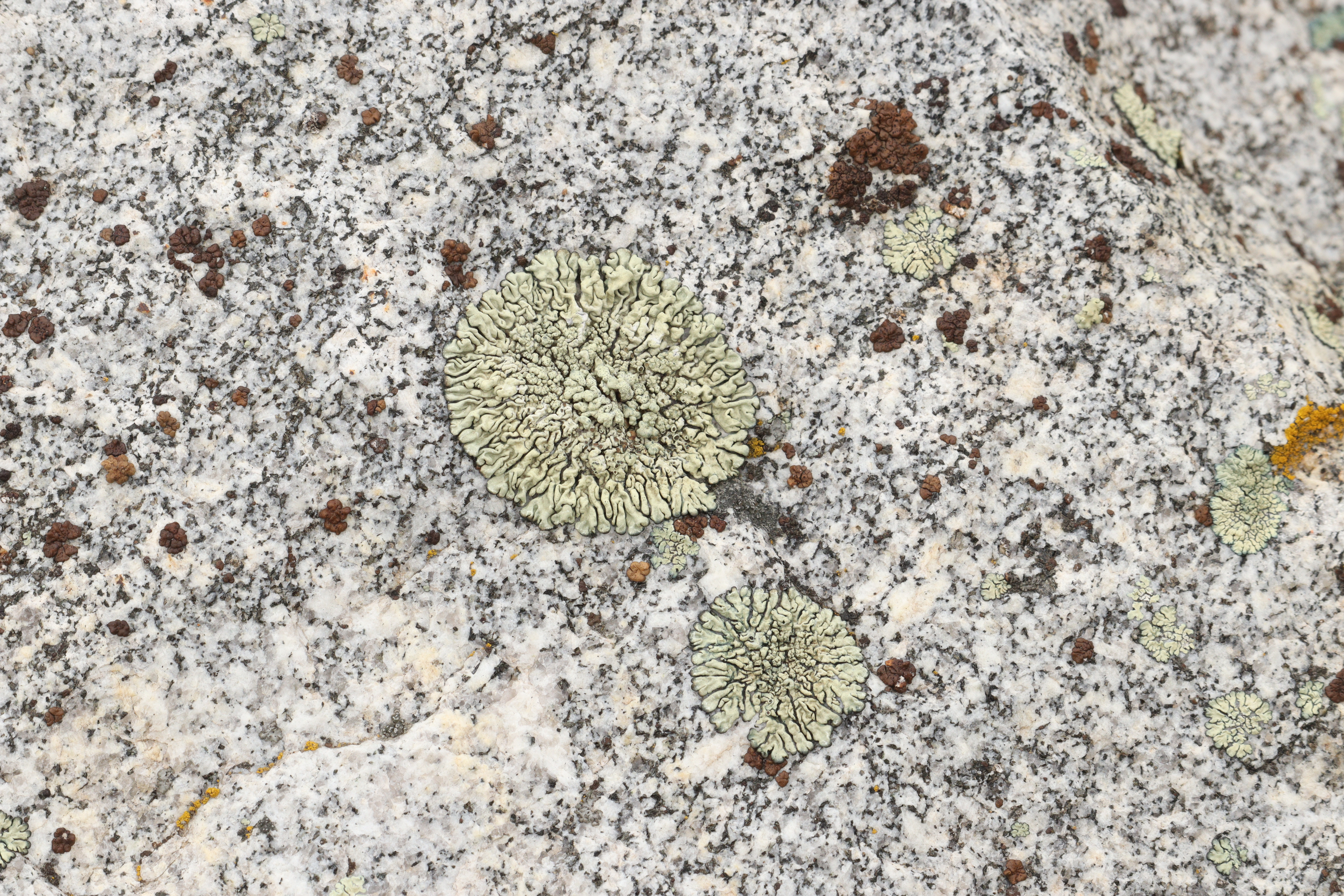
Lecanora novomexicana

- Lecanora neodegelii B.D.Ryan & T.H.Nash (2004)
- Lecanora neonashii – Mexico
- Lecanora neoqueenslandica Lumbsch (1994)
- Lecanora nohedensis Cl.Roux & M.Barbero (2011)
- Lecanora notatica Guderley (2000) – South America
- Lecanora nothocaesiella Lendemer & R.C.Harris (2013)
- Lecanora novae-hollandiae Lumbsch (1994)

== O ==
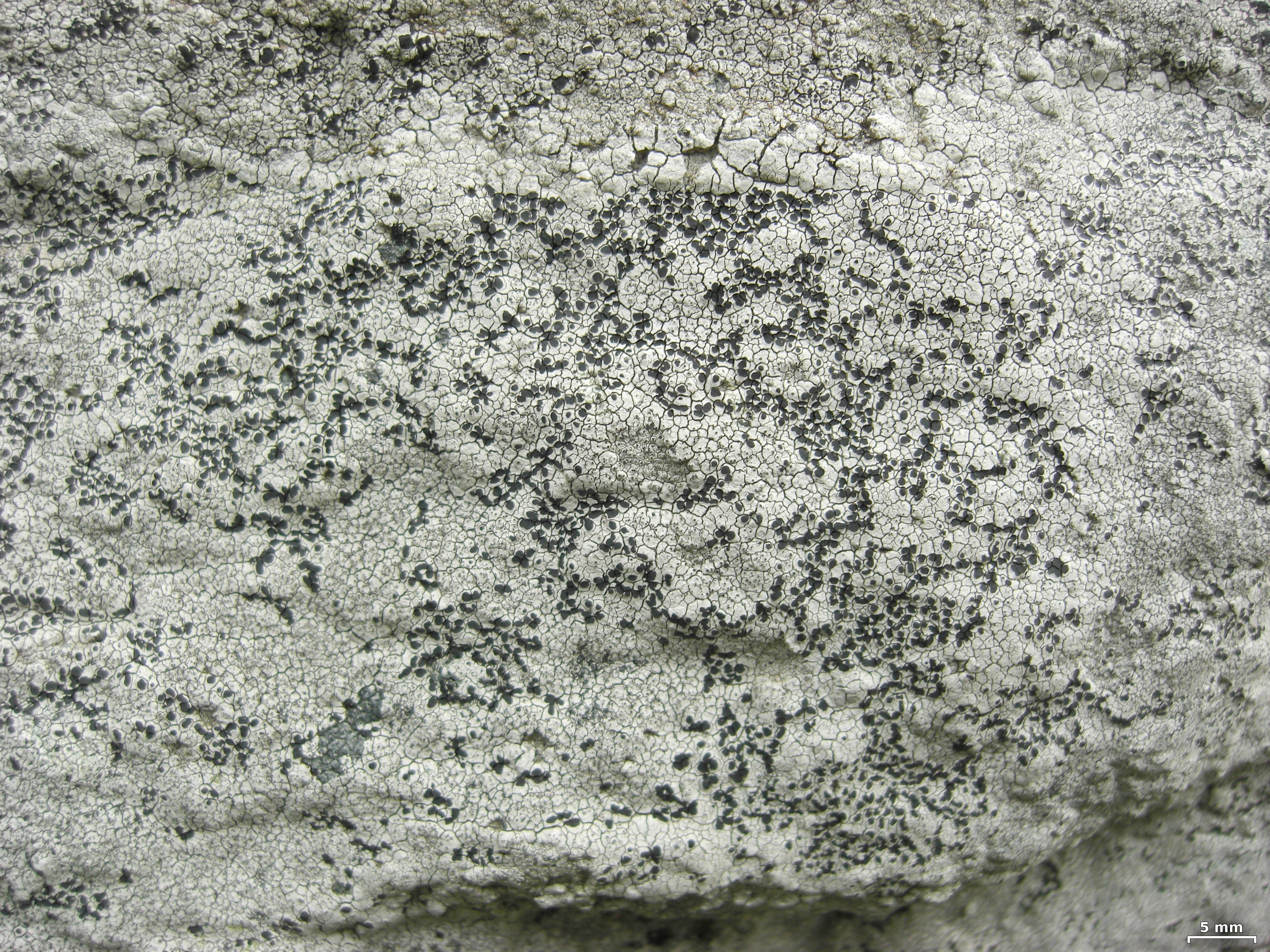
Lecanora oreinoides

- Lecanora oblutescens Nyl. (1888)
- Lecanora ochica Sipman (2007) – Greece
- Lecanora ochroidea (Ach.) Röhl. (1813)
- Lecanora ombligulata Kalb, Bungartz & Elix (2020) – Galápagos Islands
- Lecanora oreinoides (Körb.) Hertel & Rambold (1989)
- Lecanora orientoafricana Kirika & Lumbsch (2012) – Africa
- Lecanora orlovii S.Y.Kondr. & L.Lőkös (2019)

== P ==
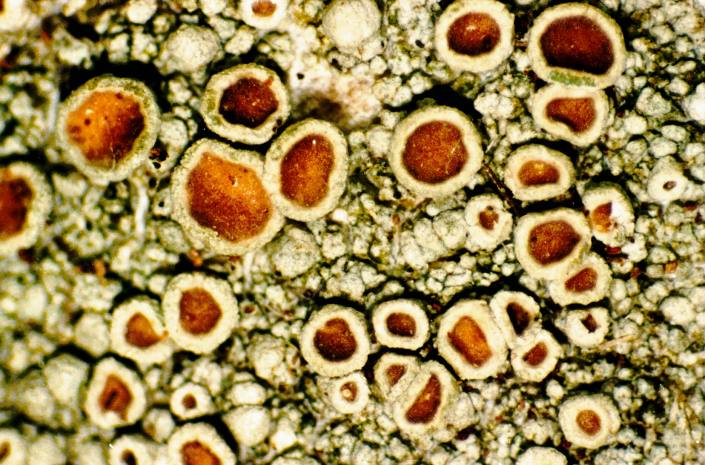
Lecanora pulicaris

- Lecanora pachysoma B.D.Ryan & Poelt (1989)
- Lecanora pacifica Tuck. (1882)
- Lecanora paddensis (Tuck.) T.Sprib. (2014)
- Lecanora pallidochlorina T.H.Nash, B.D.Ryan & Lumbsch (2003) – southwestern North America
- Lecanora pangerangoensis Zahlbr. (1928)
- Lecanora panis-erucae Hertel & V.Wirth (2006)
- Lecanora pannonica Szatala (1954)
- Lecanora panticapaensis Khodos., Naumovich, Elix & S.Y.Kondr. (2009)
- Lecanora parachroa L.A.Santos, J.G.Cavalcante & M.Cáceres (2019)
- Lecanora paramerae I.Martínez, Aragón & Lumbsch (1999)
- Lecanora parmelinoides Lumbsch (1994)
- Lecanora peninsularis K.Knudsen, Lendemer & Elix (2011)
- Lecanora perconcinna Hue (1914)
- Lecanora perconfusa Printzen (2001)
- Lecanora perithioides Nyl. (1876)
- Lecanora perpruinosa Fröberg (1989)
- Lecanora phaeocardia Vain. (1921)
- Lecanora phaeophora (Stizenb. ex Hasse) H.Magn. (1936)
- Lecanora phaeostigma (Körb.) Almb. (1984)
- Lecanora physciella (Darb.) Hertel (1984)
- Lecanora physcielloides Fryday (2004)
- Lecanora placodina Zahlbr. (1921)
- Lecanora placodiolica Lumbsch & Elix (1998) – Australia
- Lecanora planaica Lumbsch (1994)
- Lecanora plumosa Müll.Arg. (1882)
- Lecanora poliophaea (Wahlenb.) Ach. (1810)
- Lecanora polytropa (Hoffm.) Rabenh. (1845)
- Lecanora praepostera Nyl. (1873)
- Lecanora prolifera C.W.Dodge (1968)
- Lecanora prosecha Ach. (1810)
- Lecanora pseudachroa Lumbsch & Messuti (2003) – southwestern North America
- Lecanora pseudargentata Lumbsch (1994)
- Lecanora pseudephebes Øvstedal (2009)
- Lecanora pseudodecorata Lumbsch & Elix (2000)
- Lecanora pseudogangaleoides Lumbsch (1995)
- Lecanora pseudomellea B.D.Ryan (1993)
- Lecanora pseudosarcopidoides M.Brand & van den Boom (2008)
- Lecanora pueblae B.D.Ryan & T.H.Nash (1995)
- Lecanora pulicaris (Pers.) Ach. (1814)
- Lecanora puniceofusca Bagl. (1879)

== Q ==
- Lecanora queenslandica C.Knight (1888)
- Lecanora quercicola Coppins & P.James (1979)

== R ==
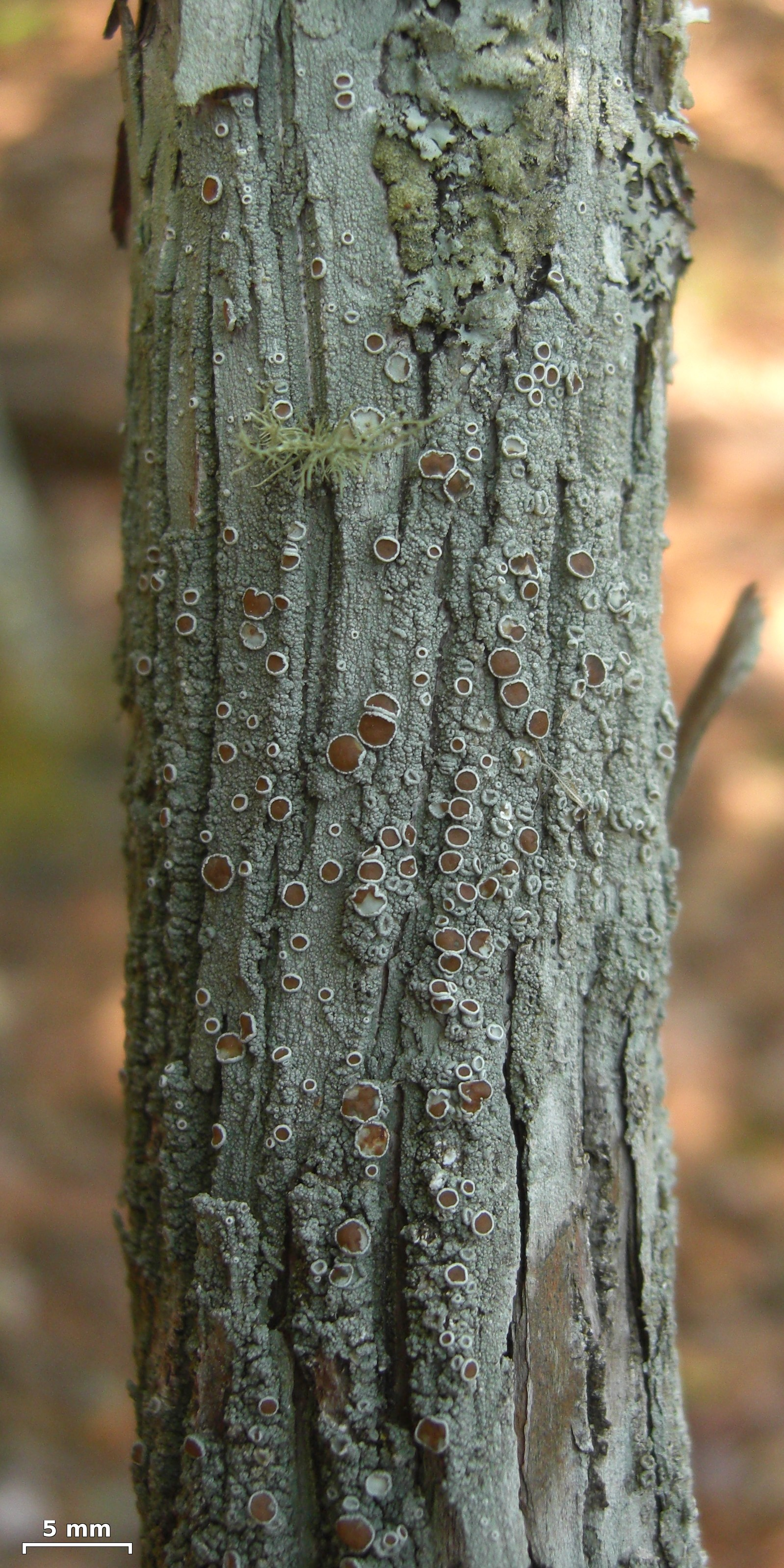
Lecanora rugosella

- Lecanora rabdotoides Guderley (2000) – South America
- Lecanora ramulicola (H.Magn.) Printzen & P.F.May (2002)
- Lecanora remota K.Knudsen & Lendemer (2016)
- Lecanora rhypoderma (C.Knight) Müll.Arg. (1891)
- Lecanora rouxii S.Ekman & Tønsberg (2004)
- Lecanora rubina (Hoffm.) Ach. (1810)
- Lecanora rugosella Zahlbr. (1928)
- Lecanora rutilescens Stirt. (1899)
- Lecanora ryanii T.H.Nash & Lumbsch (2003) – southwestern North America

== S ==
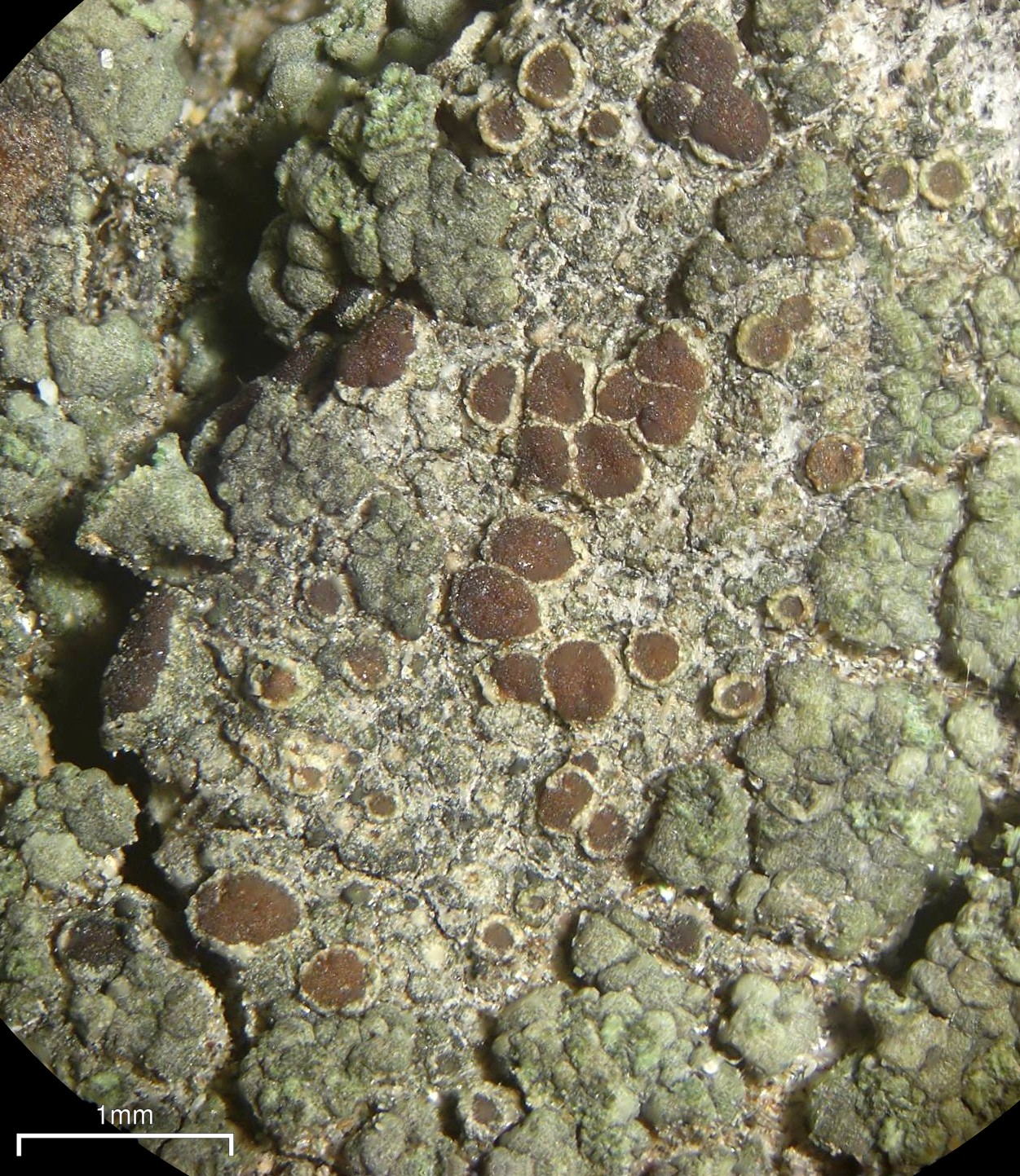
Lecanora saligna

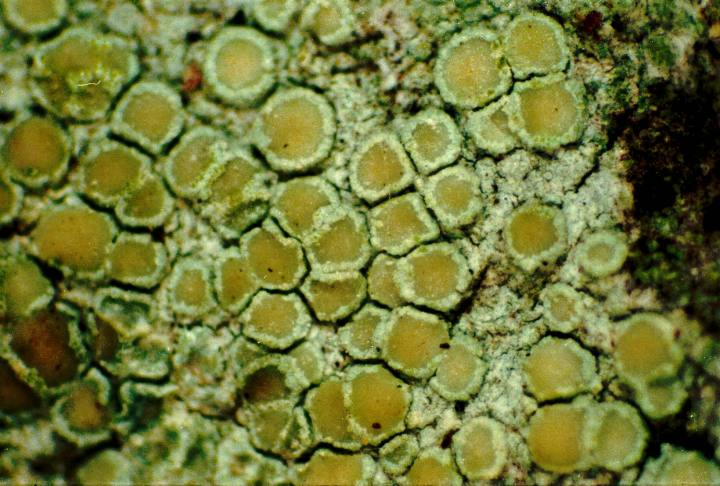
Lecanora strobilina

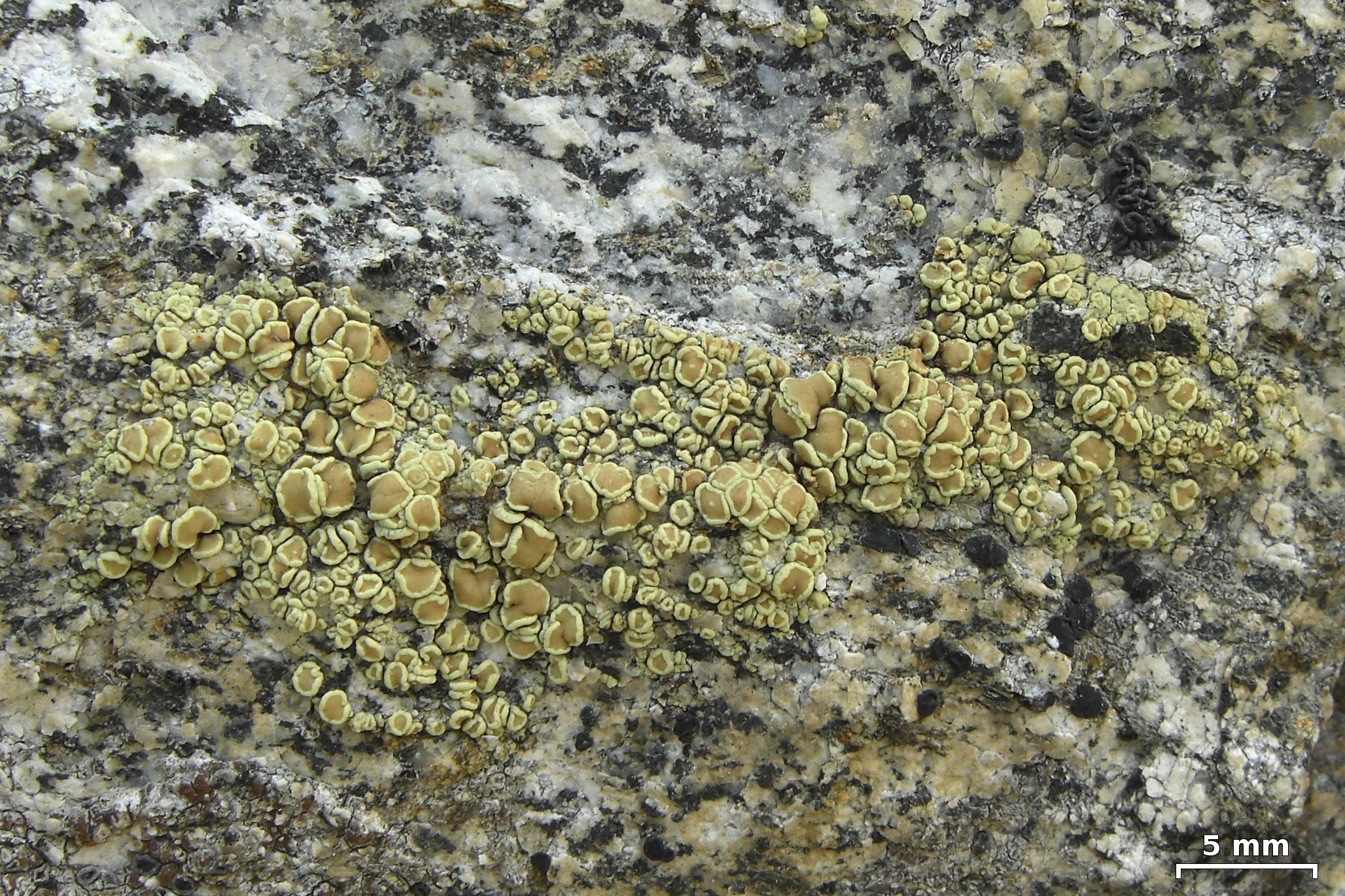
Lecanora stenotropa

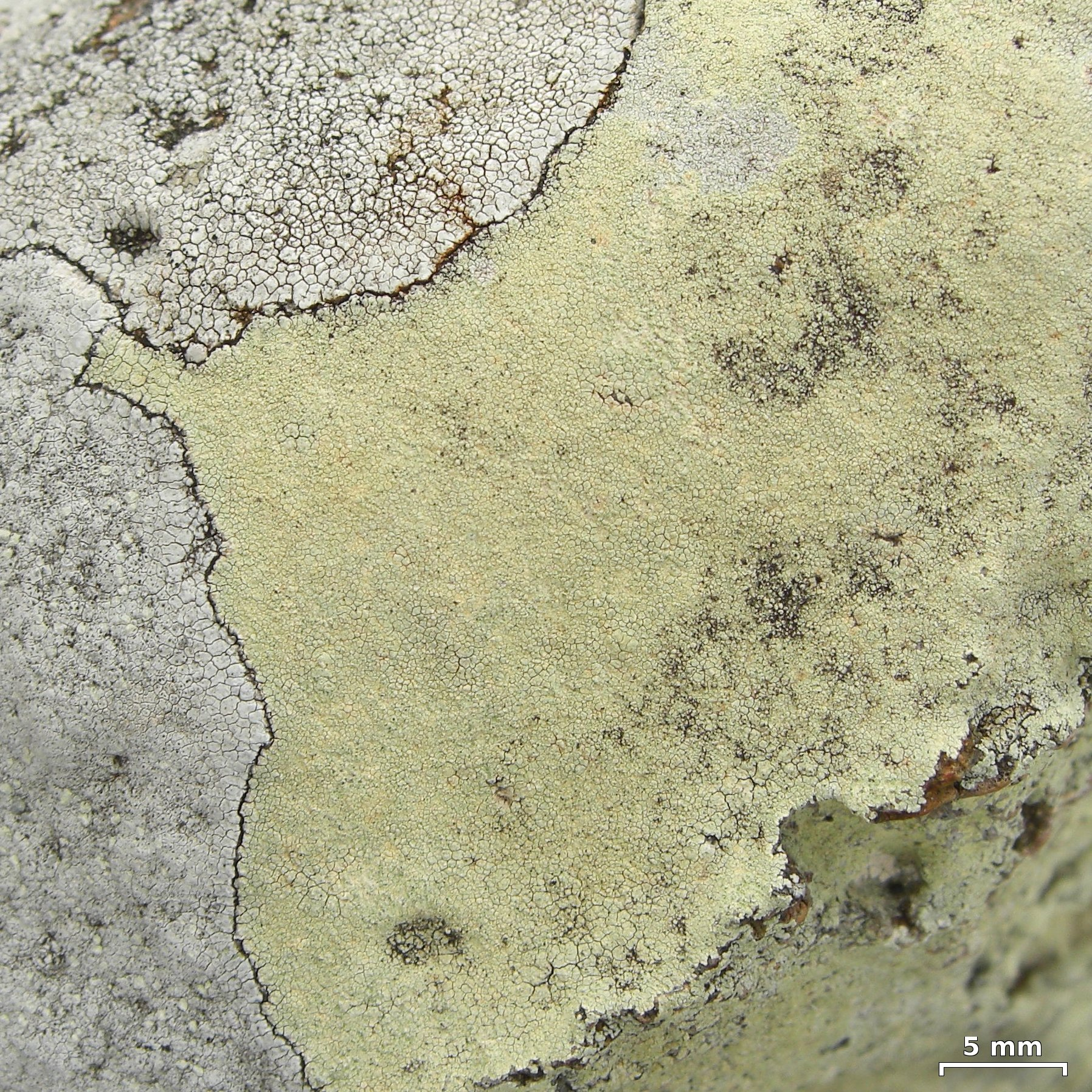
Lecanora sulphurescens

- Lecanora sachsiana E.Tripp & Lendemer (2018)
- Lecanora salicicola H.Magn. (1939)
- Lecanora saligna (Schrad.) Zahlbr. (1928)
- Lecanora sanctae-helenae Müll.Arg. (1893)
- Lecanora sarcopidoides (A.Massal.) Hedl. (1892)
- Lecanora saxigena Lendemer & R.C.Harris (2014)
- Lecanora schindleri Guderley (1999)
- Lecanora scrobiculata (Th.Fr.) Øvstedal & Elix (2021)
- Lecanora shangrilaensis Z.T.Zhao & L.Lü (2017) – China
- Lecanora silvae-nigrae V.Wirth (1969)
- Lecanora simeonensis K.Knudsen & Lendemer (2009)
- Lecanora sinensis Zahlbr. (1928)
- Lecanora sinuosa Herk & Aptroot (1999) – western Europe
- Lecanora sonorae B.D.Ryan & T.H.Nash (1989)
- Lecanora soralifera (Suza) Räsänen (1931)
- Lecanora solaris L.S.Yakovchenko & E.A.Davydov (2019) – Altai Mountains, Russia
- Lecanora sorediomarginata S.A.Rodrigues, A.Terrón & Elix (2011)
- Lecanora sphaerospora Müll.Arg. (1892)
- Lecanora stenotropa Nyl. (1872)
- Lecanora stramineoalbida Vain. (1896)
- Lecanora subaurea Zahlbr. (1928)
- Lecanora subaureoides Aptroot & Bungartz (2020) – Galápagos Islands
- Lecanora subcarnea (Sw.) Ach. (1810)
- Lecanora subcoarctata (C.Knight) Hertel (1984)
- Lecanora subcrenulata Müll.Arg. (1888)
- Lecanora subepulotica (Nyl.) Fink (1910)
- Lecanora subflava Tuck. (1866)
- Lecanora subimmergens Vain. (1921)
- Lecanora subimmersa (Fée) Vain. (1890)
- Lecanora subintricata (Nyl.) Th.Fr. (1871)
- Lecanora subjaponica L.Lü & H.Y.Wang (2012)
- Lecanora sublivescens (Nyl.) A.L.Sm. (1884)
- Lecanora subloekoesii Z.T.Zhao & L.Lü (2017) – China
- Lecanora subpiniperda C.Knight (1882)
- Lecanora subpraesistens Nayaka, Upreti & Lumbsch (2006)
- Lecanora subpurpurea Stirt. (1899)
- Lecanora subravida Nyl. (1872)
- Lecanora subrugosa Nyl. (1875)
- Lecanora subsaligna M.Brand & van den Boom (2008)
- Lecanora subsinuosa Arup, Malíček & Holien (2025) – Norway
- Lecanora substerilis Malíček & Vondrák (2017) – Eastern Europe
- Lecanora substrobilina Printzen (2001)
- Lecanora substylosa (Zahlbr.) Hertel & V. Wirth (2006)
- Lecanora subtartarea Nyl. (1859)
- Lecanora subtecta (Stirt.) Kantvilas & LaGreca (2008)
- Lecanora subtjibodensis Zahlbr. (1928)
- Lecanora subumbrina Müll.Arg. (1895)
- Lecanora subviridis de la Rosa & Messuti (2010) – South America
- Lecanora sulfurescens Fée (1873)

== T ==
- Lecanora terpenoidea Bungartz & Elix (2020) – Galápagos Islands
- Lecanora tesselina (Tuck.) Zahlbr. (1928)
- Lecanora thallophila H.Magn. (1954)
- Lecanora tjibodensis Zahlbr. (1928)
- Lecanora toroyensis Zahlbr. (1933)
- Lecanora transvaalensis Lumbsch (1995) – South Africa
- Lecanora tropica Zahlbr. (1928)

== U ==
- Lecanora ulrikii Papong & Lumbsch (2010) – Bhutan; Thailand
- Lecanora umbrina (Ach.) A.Massal. (1852)
- Lecanora umbrosa Degel. (1943)
- Lecanora upretii Papong, Nayaka & Lumbsch (2012) – India
- Lecanora usneicola Etayo (2006)
- Lecanora ussuriensis S.Y.Kondr., Lőkös & Hur (2014)

== V ==
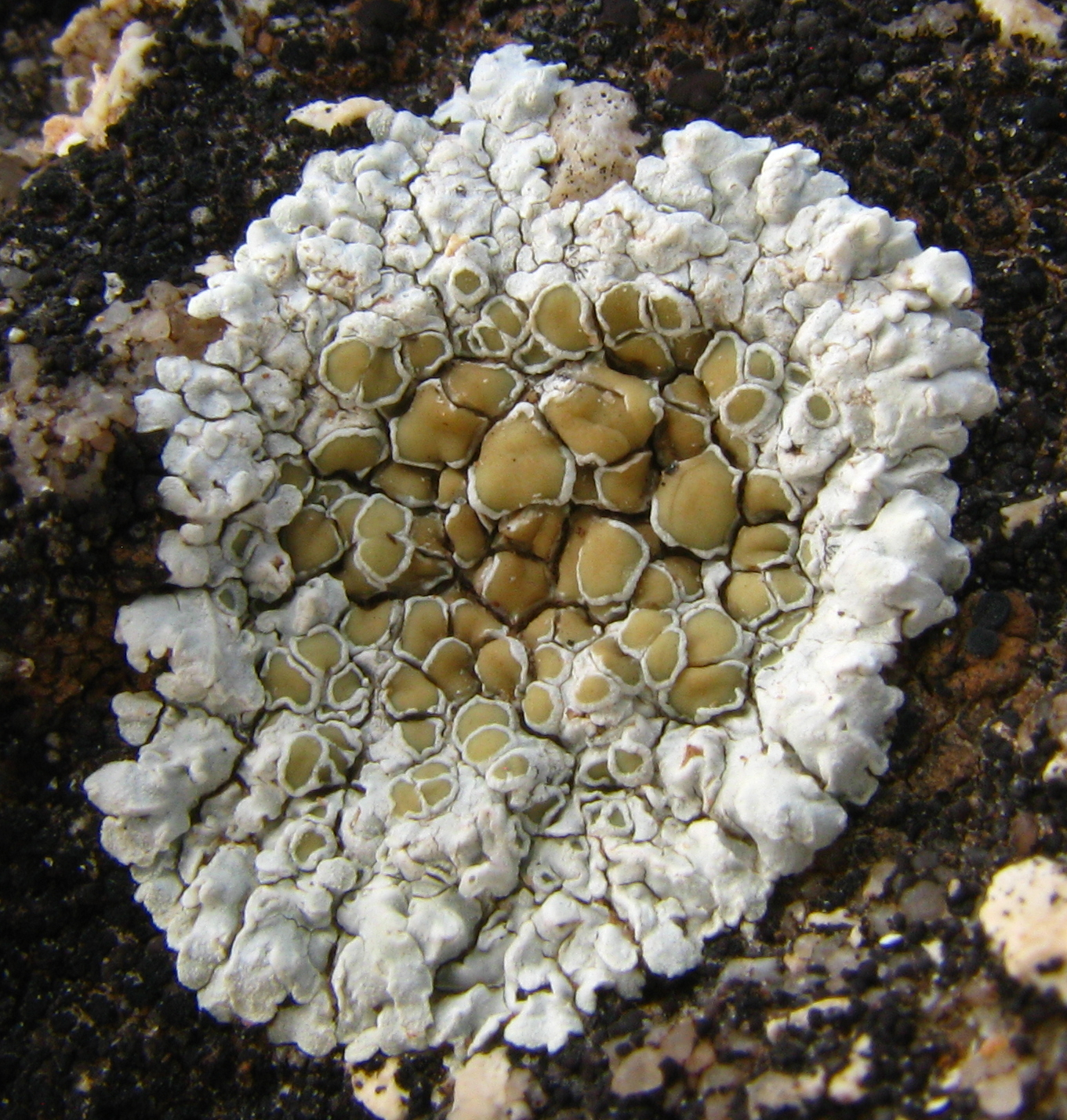
Lecanora valesiaca

- Lecanora vainioi Vänskä (1986)
- Lecanora valesiaca (Müll.Arg.) Stizenb. (1882) – China
- Lecanora vinetorum Poelt & Huneck (1968)
- Lecanora viridiatra (Stenh.) Nyl. ex Zahlbr. (1925)
- Lecanora viridipruinosa M.Svenss. & T.Sprib. (2020)
- Lecanora viriduloflava B.de Lesd. (1914)

== W ==
- Lecanora weii L.F.Han & S.Y.Guo (2009) – China
- Lecanora wilsonii Müll.Arg. (1893)
- Lecanora wirthii Kalb (2008)

== X ==
- Lecanora xanthoplumosa Guderley (2000) – South America
- Lecanora xanthoplumosella Lumbsch & Elix (2011)
- Lecanora xanthosora B.D.Ryan & Poelt (1989)
- Lecanora xanthostoma Cl.Roux ex Fröberg (1997)
- Lecanora xylophila Hue (1915)

== Z ==
- Lecanora zeorina Li J. Li & Printzen (2023)
- Lecanora zeroensis Lendemer (2011)

== Formerly placed under the genus Lecanora ==
- Lecanora aberrata is now Lecidea aberrata (Wedd.) M.Bertrand & Cl.Roux
- Lecanora actophila is now Myriolecis actophila (Wedd.) M.Bertrand & Cl.Roux
- Lecanora agardhiana is now Myriolecis agardhiana (Ach.) Śliwa, Zhao Xin & Lumbsch
- Lecanora albescens is now Polyozosia albescens (Hoffm.) S.Y.Kondr., L.Lőkös & Farkas
- Lecanora americana is now Aspicilia americana B.de Lesd.
- Lecanora andrewii is now Polyozosia andrewii (B.de Lesd.) S.Y.Kondr., L.Lőkös & Farkas
- Lecanora anopta is now Lecanoropsis anopta (Nyl.) S.Y.Kondr., L.Lőkös & Farkas
- Lecanora antiqua is now Myriolecis antiqua (J.R.Laundon) Śliwa, Zhao Xin & Lumbsch
- Lecanora bandolensis is now Myriolecis bandolensis (B.de Lesd.) M.Bertrand, Cl.Roux & Nimis
- Lecanora bicincta is now Glaucomaria bicincta (Ramond) S.Y.Kondr., L.Lőkös & Farkas
- Lecanora collatolica is now Bapalmuia confusa Kalb & Lücking
- Lecanora flowersiana is now Myriolecis flowersiana (H.Magn.) Śliwa, Zhao Xin & Lumbsch
- Lecanora fugiens is now Myriolecis fugiens (Nyl.) Śliwa, Zhao Xin & Lumbsch
- Lecanora persimilis is now Myriolecis persimilis (Th.Fr.) Śliwa, Zhao Xin & Lumbsch
- Lecanora phaedrophthalma is now Omphalodina phaedrophthalma (Poelt) S.Y.Kondr., L.Lőkös & Farkas
- Lecanora phryganitis is now Polycaulina phryganitis (Tuck.) Hue
- Lecanora pinguis is now Protoparmeliopsis pinguis (Tuck.) S.Y.Kondr.
- Lecanora populicola is now Polyozosia populicola (DC.) S.Y.Kondr., L.Lőkös & Farkas
- Lecanora pruinosa is now Polyozosia pruinosa (Chaub.) S.Y.Kondr., L.Lőkös & Farkas
- Lecanora pseudistera is now Omphalodina pseudistera (Nyl.) S.Y.Kondr., L.Lőkös & Farkas
- Lecanora tenera is now Cliostomum tenerum Coppins & S.Ekman
- Lecanora thysanophora is now Verseghya thysanophora (R.C.Harris) S.Y.Kondr., L.Lőkös, Farkas & Hur
