= Lecanora aberrata =

Scientific classification
- Domain: Eukaryota
- Kingdom: Fungi
- Division: Ascomycota
- Class: Lecanoromycetes
- Order: Lecanorales
- Family: Lecanoraceae
- Genus: Lecanora
- Species: L. aberrata

Binomial name
- Lecanora aberrata (Stirt.) Elix (2007)

Synonyms
- Lecidea aberrata Stirt. (1881)

Species of fungus

Lecanora aberrata is a relatively rare species of crustose lichen in the family Lecanoraceae. It is found in Australia, where it grows on bark in subtropical and tropical rainforests. It has a grey-white to creamy white thallus.

== Taxonomy ==
The lichen was originally described in 1881 under the name Lecidea aberrata by Scottish lichenologist James Stirton. He discovered the type specimen in Taylor Range, near Brisbane, where it was growing on the bark of Eucalyptus crebra. He suggested that it was related to Lecidea vernalis. Australian lichenologist John Elix transferred Lecidea aberrata to the genus Lecanora in 2007 because of the reduced or excluded algal cells in the apothecial margins, as well as the structure of its asci, both of which are features typical of Lecanora.

== Description ==
Lecanora aberrata has a grey-white to creamy-white crust-like thallus up to 7 cm (2.8 in) wide. It has dense granular soredia on its upper surface. It contains the chemicals atranorin, pannarin, and arthothelin. Ascospores number eight per ascus, and are ellipsoid, measuring 8.5–11.0 by 5.0–6.5 μm.

Lecanora neoqueenslandica is similar in chemistry and in the structure of the apothecia, but it does not form soredia.

== See also ==
- List of Lecanora species
