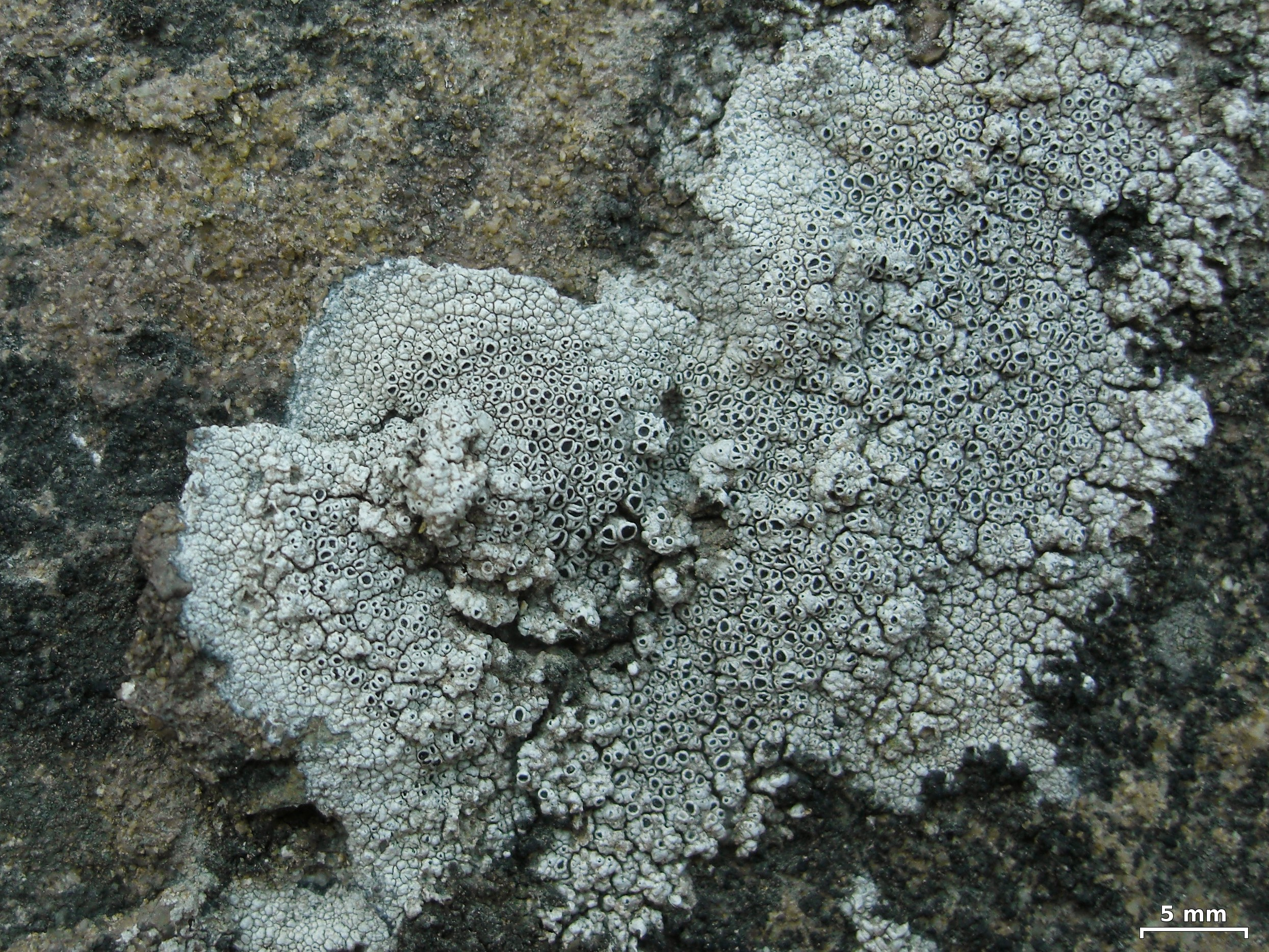

Scientific classification
- Domain: Eukaryota
- Kingdom: Fungi
- Division: Ascomycota
- Class: Lecanoromycetes
- Order: Lecanorales
- Family: Lecanoraceae
- Genus: Lecanora
- Species: L. gangaleoides

Binomial name
- Lecanora gangaleoides Nyl. (1872)

Synonyms
- Lecanora atrynea var. melacarpa Nyl. ex Cromb. (1873); Lecanora atrynea var. melacarpa Nyl. (1879) [1878]; Lecanora subfusca f. melacarpa (Nyl. ex Cromb.) Leight. (1879)

= Lecanora gangaleoides =

Species of lichen

Lecanora gangaleoides is a species of crustose lichen in the family Lecanoraceae. It was described as new to science by William Nylander in 1872.

== See also ==
- List of Lecanora species
