= Lecanora solaris =

Scientific classification
- Domain: Eukaryota
- Kingdom: Fungi
- Division: Ascomycota
- Class: Lecanoromycetes
- Order: Lecanorales
- Family: Lecanoraceae
- Genus: Lecanora
- Species: L. solaris

Binomial name
- Lecanora solaris L.S.Yakovchenko & E.A.Davydov (2019)

Species of lichen

Lecanora solaris is a species of saxicolous (rock-dwelling) crustose lichen in the family Lecanoraceae. Found in the Altai Mountains in Russia, the lichen was described as new to science in 2019 by Lydia Yakovchenko and Evgeny Davydov. The lichen is similar in general morphology to Lecanora somervellii, but can be distinguished from that species by its small, squamulose (scaly) to marginally lobate umbilicate thallus and the persistent margin of its apothecia. The species epithet makes reference to the bright yellow (solaris = "sunny") colour of the lichen.

== Description ==
Lecanora solaris is a lichen characterized by a squamulose (scale-like) thallus that forms roughly circular patches up to 10–15 mm in diameter. The individual squamules measure 0.7–1.3–1.9 mm across, are crowded together, and appear moderately to strongly convex. Initially rounded, they soon become incised with irregular outlines, and sometimes develop a peltate (shield-like) form attached at a central point. The surface is distinctively bright yellow and shiny, initially smooth but becoming strongly rugose (wrinkled) with age. The thallus lacks vegetative propagules (structures for asexual reproduction), with its yellow colouration resulting from the presence of calycin and usnic acid.

Apothecia (fruiting bodies) are common and typically concentrated in the centre of the thallus. These lecanorine (disc-shaped with a rim of thalline tissue) apothecia typically measure 0.9–1.2–1.5 mm in diameter and feature a raised margin. Initially immersed in the thallus, they soon become sessile (attached directly to the surface) and strongly constricted at the base. The disc starts flat but later becomes moderately convex, and is coloured similarly to the thallus—ranging from bright yellow to ochre-yellow. The thalline margin is initially distinct but later becomes less prominent, remaining the same colour as the disc.

== Habitat and distribution ==
Lecanora solaris inhabits specific ecological niches within high mountain environments, growing primarily on hard volcanic or weakly calcareous overhanging rocks. It grows in open pioneer communities at elevations ranging from 2,630 to 3,100 metres above sea level. Unlike its close relative Lecanora somervellii, which prefers sunny exposed siliceous rocks, L. solaris shows a distinct preference for shaded, weakly calcareous rock surfaces.

The species has been documented only in the Altai Mountains of Russia, with specific occurrences recorded in the Sailjugem Range and the Mongun-Taiga massif. In both these locations, L. solaris appears to be relatively scarce, occurring alongside other lichen species such as Acarospora cf. elevata, various Aspicilia species, Protoparmeliopsis peltata, and Carbonea vorticosa. These associated species form part of the pioneer lichen communities that colonise harsh mountain environments where vascular plant growth is limited.

== See also ==
- List of Lecanora species
