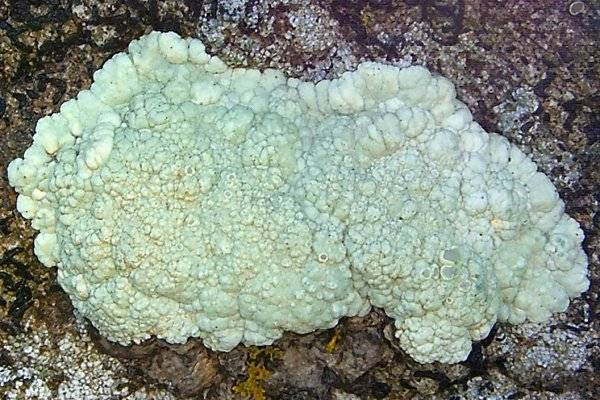

Scientific classification
- Domain: Eukaryota
- Kingdom: Fungi
- Division: Ascomycota
- Class: Lecanoromycetes
- Order: Lecanorales
- Family: Lecanoraceae
- Genus: Lecanora
- Species: L. pinguis

Binomial name
- Lecanora pinguis Tuck. (1864)

= Lecanora pinguis =

Species of lichen

Lecanora is a species of crustose lichen in the family Lecanoraceae. It was described as new to science in 1864 by American botanist Edward Tuckerman.

== See also ==
- List of Lecanora species
