= Lecanora lichexanthoxylina =

Scientific classification
- Kingdom: Fungi
- Division: Ascomycota
- Class: Lecanoromycetes
- Order: Lecanorales
- Family: Lecanoraceae
- Genus: Lecanora
- Species: L. lichexanthoxylina

Binomial name
- Lecanora lichexanthoxylina Aptroot & M.F.Souza (2021)

Species of lichen

Lecanora lichexanthoxylina is a species of crustose lichen in the family Lecanoraceae. Found in Maracaju Mountain Range in Mato Grosso do Sul (Brazil), it was formally described as a new species in 2021 by André Aptroot and Maria Fernanda Souza. The specific epithet refers to the presence of lichexanthone, a secondary chemical.

== See also ==
- List of Lecanora species
