= Lecanora lividocarnea =

Scientific classification
- Kingdom: Fungi
- Division: Ascomycota
- Class: Lecanoromycetes
- Order: Lecanorales
- Family: Lecanoraceae
- Genus: Lecanora
- Species: L. lividocarnea

Binomial name
- Lecanora lividocarnea Vain. (1913)

Species of lichen-forming fungus

Lecanora lividocarnea is a species of crustose lichen in the family Lecanoraceae. It was first scientifically described in 1913 from specimens collected in the Philippine Islands, where it grows on tree bark in mountainous forests. The species is characterised by its greyish to bluish-grey crust and distinctive livid-flesh-coloured fruiting bodies that measure 1–2.5 millimetres across. Outside the Philippines, the species has also been recorded from Thailand.

== Taxonomy ==
Lecanora lividocarnea was first described by the Finnish lichenologist Edvard August Vainio in 1913. Vainio's original description was published in his work on Philippine lichens, where he distinguished this species from the similar Lecanora flavovirentis based on differences in the hypothecium (the tissue layer beneath the spore-producing surface) and the chemistry of the thallus.

== Description ==
Lecanora lividocarnea is a crustose lichen, meaning it forms a crust-like growth that adheres tightly to its substrate and cannot be removed without damage. The thallus (the vegetative body of the lichen) is uniform in texture with a somewhat thick to thin consistency, appearing verruculose (covered with small wart-like projections) with these projections being unequal in size. The surface is continuous or somewhat dispersed, occasionally appearing slightly subdivided, and ranges from greyish to glaucescent (having a greyish-blue bloom) in colour. The thallus exhibits characteristic colours when tested with certain chemical reagents: the medulla (inner layer) is white, showing no reaction to C, while the thallus is K+ (yellow).

The fruiting bodies (apothecia) are sessile and measure 1–2.5 millimetres in width. They have a flat to slightly convex disc, livid-flesh to pale livid in colour. The disc margin ranges from nude (lacking a covering) to opaque in texture. The apothecia lack a distinct thalline margin (a rim formed by thallus tissue) at maturity, though younger specimens may show a sharp disc margin or occasionally a slightly elevated rim. In some cases, the disc margin may have a crenulate (scalloped) edge or only show crenulations on the inner side, with a nearly entire to flexuous (wavy) outer edge. Isidia and soredia are not present.

The hymenium (spore-producing layer) is either whitish or pale, whilst the hypothecium is persistent, appearing whitish to pale. The hypothallus is blackish, and partly delimits the thallus. The epithecium (uppermost layer of the hymenium) is pale and not granular. The paraphyses (sterile filaments among the asci) are tightly coherent. The asci (spore sacs) are 8-spored with distichous (arranged in two rows), hyaline, and ellipsoidal spores. The spores are simple, measuring 16–18 μm in length and 8–10 μm in width.

The excipulum (the outer rim of the apothecium) is whitish internally; tissues beneath the hypothecium are paler. The lichen contains atranorin and 2'-O-methylperlatolic acid as major secondary metabolites, and minor amounts of chloroatranorin and 2'-O-methylstenosporic acid.

== Habitat and distribution ==
Lecanora lividocarnea was originally described from material collected in the Philippine Islands, specifically from the regions of Benguet and Paoay, at an elevation of about 2,100 metres near Pauai (modern Paoay), Benguet, Luzon. The species grows on tree bark in forested areas, where Vainio noted it was somewhat similar in habitat to L. hypocrocea. Lecanora lividocarnea is one of 14 Lecanora species that have been recorded from the Philippines, and one of three in the genus was first described from specimens collected in the country. The lichen has also been reported from Chiang Mai in Thailand.

== See also ==
- List of Lecanora species
