= Lecanora austrae-frigidae =

Scientific classification
- Domain: Eukaryota
- Kingdom: Fungi
- Division: Ascomycota
- Class: Lecanoromycetes
- Order: Lecanorales
- Family: Lecanoraceae
- Genus: Lecanora
- Species: L. austrae-frigidae

Binomial name
- Lecanora austrae-frigidae Øvstedal (2009)

Species of lichen

Lecanora austrae-frigidae is a rare species of lignicolous (wood-dwelling) and crustose lichen in the family Lecanoraceae. Found in Antarctica, it was formally described as a new species in 2009 by Norwegian lichenologist Dag Øvstedal. The type specimen was collected from Deception Island (part of the South Shetland Islands). Here it was found growing on the imported timber of a decrepit whaling station. The lichen has a pale yellow-green, crustose thallus up to 2–3 cm (0.8–1.2 in) wide and up to 0.3 mm thick. The apothecia start out immersed in the thallus, but later become sessile; they are up to 0.7 mm wide with a flat, orange-brown disc. No mature ascospores were detected in the type specimen. Several lichen products are found in Lecanora austrae-frigidae: arthothelin is a major metabolite, while minor compounds include atranorin, lichexanthone, and several chlorinated derivatives of both lichexanthone and norlichexanthone.

== See also ==
- List of Lecanora species
