= Lecanora muscigena =

Scientific classification
- Domain: Eukaryota
- Kingdom: Fungi
- Division: Ascomycota
- Class: Lecanoromycetes
- Order: Lecanorales
- Family: Lecanoraceae
- Genus: Lecanora
- Species: L. muscigena

Binomial name
- Lecanora muscigena Øvstedal & Fryday (2020)

Species of lichen

Lecanora muscigena is a species of lichen in the family Lecanoraceae. It was described as new to science in 2020 by Dag Øvstedal & Alan Fryday. It is found in the subantarctic island of South Georgia, where it grows on ground-dwelling mosses.

== See also ==
- List of Lecanora species
