= Lecanora luteomarginata =

Scientific classification
- Kingdom: Fungi
- Division: Ascomycota
- Class: Lecanoromycetes
- Order: Lecanorales
- Family: Lecanoraceae
- Genus: Lecanora
- Species: L. luteomarginata

Binomial name
- Lecanora luteomarginata Nayaka, Upreti & Lumbsch (2006)

Species of lichen

Lecanora luteomarginata is a species of saxicolous (rock-dwelling) and crustose lichen in the family Lecanoraceae. Found in India, it was formally described as a new species in 2006 by Sanjeeva Nayaka, Dalip Kumar Upreti, and H. Thorsten Lumbsch. The type specimen was collected in the trail from Gaurikund to Rambara in the valley of the Mandakini River (Chamoli district, Uttaranchal) at an elevation ranging from between 1,980 and 2,800 m (6,500 and 9,190 ft). It is only known from the type locality. Characteristics of the lichen include its thin, smooth thallus, dark brown apothecia with bright yellow margins, melacarpella-type amphithecia and glabrata-type epihymenia. The specific epithet luteomarginata refers to the yellow-coloured apothecial margins. Secondary compounds in the lichen include arthothelin, atranorin, chloroatranorin, and thiophanic acid.

== See also ==
- List of Lecanora species
