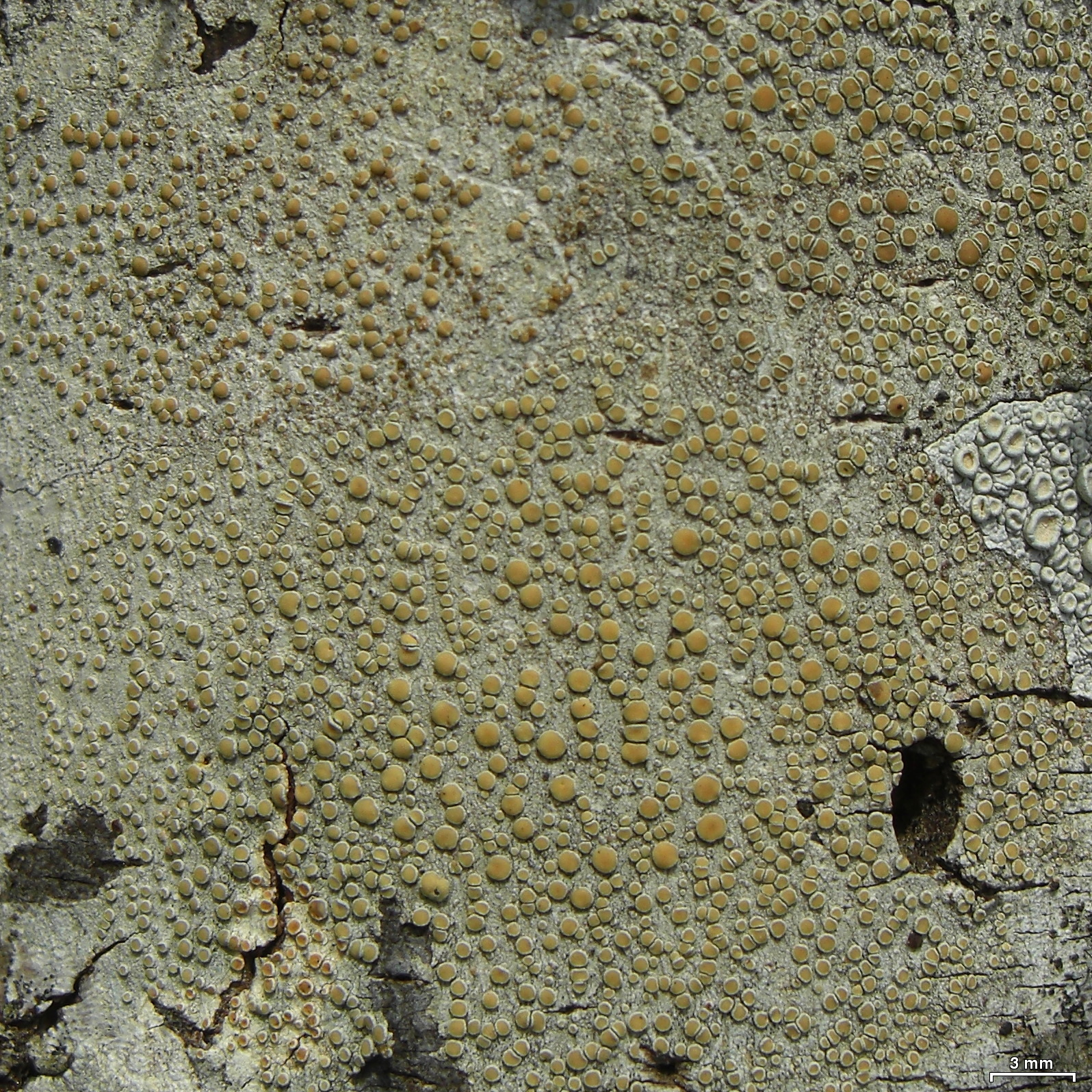

Scientific classification
- Domain: Eukaryota
- Kingdom: Fungi
- Division: Ascomycota
- Class: Lecanoromycetes
- Order: Lecanorales
- Family: Lecanoraceae
- Genus: Lecanora
- Species: L. louisianae

Binomial name
- Lecanora louisianae B.de Lesd. (1932)

= Lecanora louisianae =

Species of lichen

Lecanora louisianae is a species of corticolous (bark-dwelling), crustose lichen in the family Lecanoraceae. It was formally described as a new species in 1932 by French lichenologist Maurice Bouly de Lesdain. It is common and widespread in the Coastal Plain region of southeastern North America.

Arthonia agelastica is a lichenicolous fungus that parasitises Lecanora louisianae. Infection by the fungus causes bleaching or discolouration, or (less often) no obvious effect on the host. Some other lichenicolous fungi recorded on L. louisianae include Skyttea lecanorae, Chaenothecopsis kalbii, and Taeniolella delicata.

== See also ==
- List of Lecanora species
