= Lecanora merrillii =

Scientific classification
- Kingdom: Fungi
- Division: Ascomycota
- Class: Lecanoromycetes
- Order: Lecanorales
- Family: Lecanoraceae
- Genus: Lecanora
- Species: L. merrillii

Binomial name
- Lecanora merrillii Vain. (1913)

Species of lichen-forming fungus

Lecanora merrillii is a species of crustose lichen in the family Lecanoraceae. It was first scientifically described in 1913 from specimens collected on coconut palm bark in the Philippines, and named in honour of the American botanist Elmer Drew Merrill. The species forms a smooth to slightly warted, straw-tinged grey crust with tightly attached fruiting bodies that are typically less than 1.5 millimetres wide. In addition to its occurrence in the Philippines, the lichen has also been found growing in the Gilbert Islands.

== Taxonomy ==
Lecanora merrillii was first described by the Finnish lichenologist Edvard August Vainio in 1913, who named it for the American botanist Elmer Drew Merrill. Vainio's account presents it as a distinct species of Lecanora based on a combination of morphology, simple spot test reactions, and microscopic features recorded from Philippine material.

== Description ==
Lecanora merrillii is a crustose lichen with a closely adherent, continuous thallus that looks smooth to slightly warted; the warts are fine and can be scattered or crowded. The colour is straw-tinged grey (substramineous-glaucescent). In simple spot tests the thallus is K+ (yellow) and C−; the medulla is white, and a blackish hypothallus partly outlines the margin of the thallus.

The fruiting bodies (apothecia) are tightly attached and often crowded, about 0.8–1.5 mm across. Their discs are flat, pale, and naked (without a surface pruina), appearing opaque; the discs are K− and C−. The rim is thin, nearly entire, and the same colour as the thallus; in section the apothecium is round (terete). Internally, the hypothecium is whitish and the hymenium is 50–75 μm thick and I+ (persistently blue) in iodine. The epithecium is pale and granular, and the paraphyses are tightly coherent with very slender lumina. Asci contain eight, colourless, simple ascospores arranged in two rows; the spores are oblong (rarely ellipsoidal), with obtuse tips, and measure 11–15 μm × 5–7 μm. The internal excipulum (apothecial rim tissue) is whitish and contains large crystals.

== Habitat and distribution ==
Vainio described the species from the island of Guimaras in the Philippines, collected by Elmer Drew Merrill (collection no. 6720). The material was taken on the bark of coconut palms (Cocos) growing on the seashore. No other substrates or localities were cited in the protologue. Lecanora merrillii is one of 14 Lecanora species that have been recorded from the Philippines, and one of three in the genus that was first described from specimens collected in the country. The lichen has also been recorded growing on the shaded bark of Guettarda speciosa in the Onotoa atoll in the Gilbert Islands.

== See also ==
- List of Lecanora species
