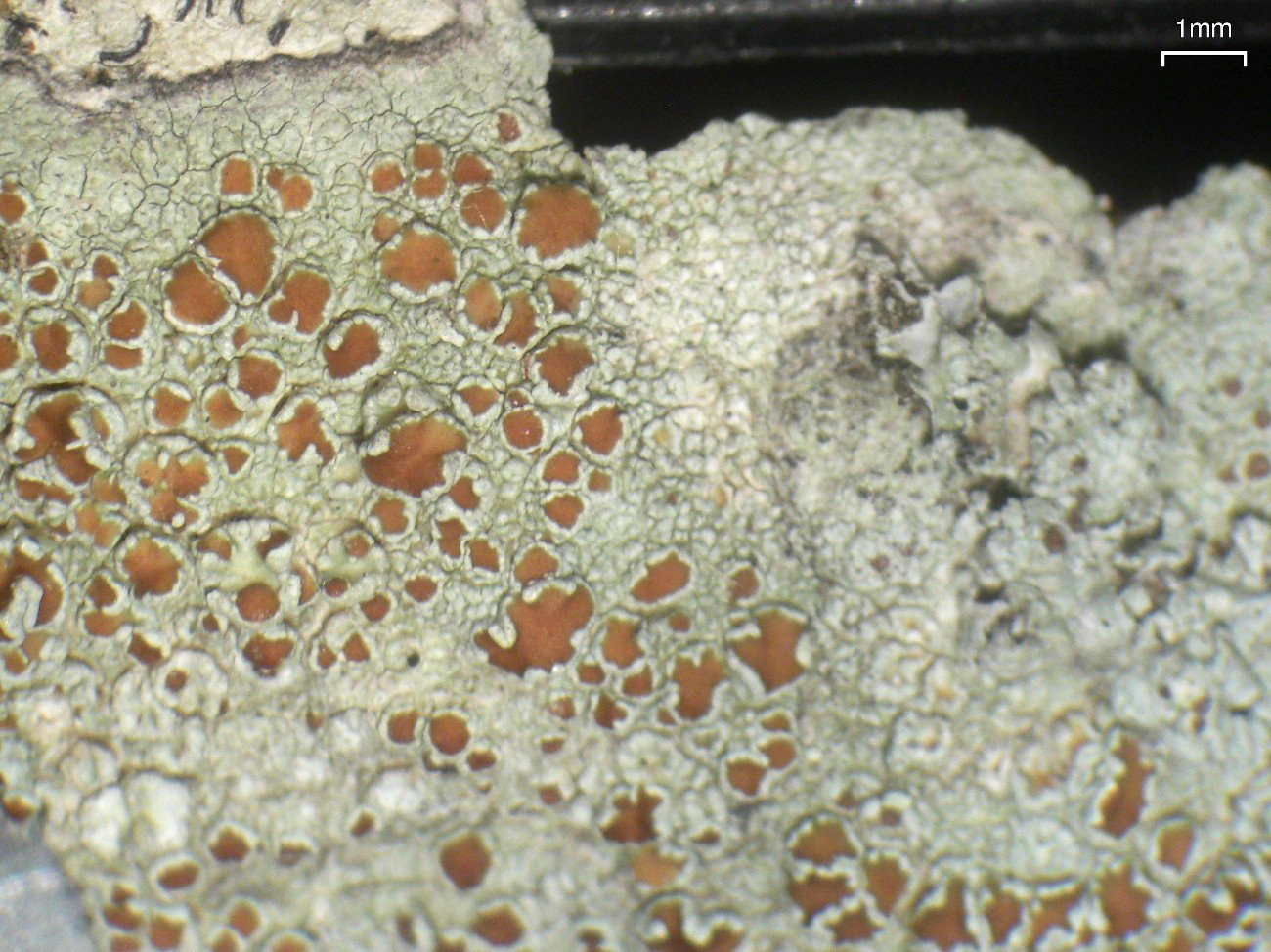

Conservation status
- Secure (NatureServe)

Scientific classification
- Kingdom: Fungi
- Division: Ascomycota
- Class: Lecanoromycetes
- Order: Lecanorales
- Family: Lecanoraceae
- Genus: Lecanora
- Species: L. hybocarpa

Binomial name
- Lecanora hybocarpa (Tuck.) Brodo (1984)

Synonyms
- Parmelia hybocarpa Tuck. (1849)

= Lecanora hybocarpa =

Species of lichen

Lecanora hybocarpa is a species of crustose lichen in the family Lecanoraceae. Originally described in 1849 as a species of Parmelia, it was transferred to Lecanora in 1984 by Irwin Brodo.

A 2025 study reassessed material identified as Lecanora hybocarpa in Europe and Macaronesia by comparing those specimens with North American collections using morphology, thin-layer chromatography, and DNA sequence data (nrITS and mtSSU). The authors concluded that true L. hybocarpa has not yet been confirmed in Europe. Instead, European specimens matching the same general morphology represent several distinct taxa, including L. sinuosa and three species newly described in that study (L. cryptosinuosa, L. macaronesica, and L. subsinuosa). The same work reported L. pseudargentata in Europe for the first time and recommended DNA sequencing for reliable identification within this complex, suggesting the informal aggregate name Lecanora hybocarpa agg. for specimens with the "hybocarpa" morphotype that have not been verified with DNA.

== See also ==
- List of Lecanora species
