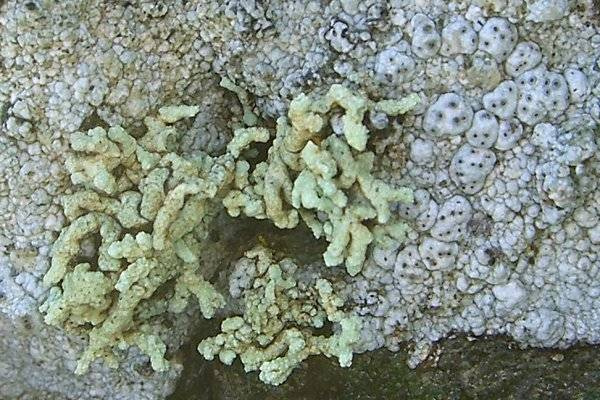

Conservation status
- Imperiled (NatureServe)

Scientific classification
- Kingdom: Fungi
- Division: Ascomycota
- Class: Lecanoromycetes
- Order: Lecanorales
- Family: Lecanoraceae
- Genus: Lecanora
- Species: L. phryganitis

Binomial name
- Lecanora phryganitis Tuck. (1866)

Synonyms
- Polycauliona phryganitis (Tuck.) Hue (1909)

= Lecanora phryganitis =

Species of lichen

Lecanora phryganitis is a species of lichen in the family Lecanoraceae. It was described as new to science in 1866 by American botanist Edward Tuckerman.

== See also ==
- List of Lecanora species
