= Lecanora shangrilaensis =

Scientific classification
- Domain: Eukaryota
- Kingdom: Fungi
- Division: Ascomycota
- Class: Lecanoromycetes
- Order: Lecanorales
- Family: Lecanoraceae
- Genus: Lecanora
- Species: L. shangrilaensis

Binomial name
- Lecanora shangrilaensis Z.T.Zhao & L.Lü (2017)

Species of lichen

Lecanora shangrilaensis is a species of crustose lichen in the family Lecanoraceae. Found in southwestern China, it was described as a new species in 2017 by Zun-Tian Zhao and Lei Lü. The type collection was made in Shangri-La county (in Yunnan Province), at an altitude of 3,500 metres (11,500 ft); here the lichen was found growing on pinecones. The specific epithet, shangrilaensis, refers to the type locality.

== Description ==
It has a thin, whitish to yellowish-gray thallus. Its asci contains 12–16 ascospores, which is somewhat unusual (typically there are eight), and known to occur in only nine species of Lecanora. Lecanora shangrilaensis can be distinguished from other multispored species of Lecanora by the presence of usnic acid rather than atranorin and the pruina-free discs with coarse granular epihymenium. Other characterics include the thin thallus, yellow to yellowish-brown apothecial disc, 12 to 16-spored ascus, and the pinecone substrate.

=== Similar species ===
Lookalike species with a similar morphology are L. cateilea, L. loekoesii, and L. weii. They can be each be distinguished from L. shangrilaensis by subtle characteristics, or the presence of secondary chemicals. For example, characteristics that distinguish L. shangrilaensis from L. loekoesii include amphithecia with large crystals, darker-coloured apothecial discs, the presence of atranorin and absence of phenolic compounds. Another lookalike, L. polytropa, also has a thin thallus and yellowish apothecial discs, but unlike L. shangrilaensis, it has only eight spores per ascus.

== See also ==
- List of Lecanora species
