= Lecanora zeorina =

Scientific classification
- Kingdom: Fungi
- Division: Ascomycota
- Class: Lecanoromycetes
- Order: Lecanorales
- Family: Lecanoraceae
- Genus: Lecanora
- Species: L. zeorina

Binomial name
- Lecanora zeorina Li J.Li & Printzen (2023)

Species of lichen-forming fungus

Lecanora zeorina is a species of crustose lichen-forming fungus in the family Lecanoraceae. It was described in 2023 from south-western China by the lichenologists Li-Juan Li and Christian Printzen. It was classified in the genus Lecanora using a combination of morphology, chemistry, and DNA-based phylogenetic analyses (using ITS and mtSSU). The holotype specimen (KUN-L-66434) was collected by Lisong Wang and colleagues in 2019 from sandstone on rocky slopes beside provincial highway 213, on the route from Huili to Jiaopingdu in Sichuan Province, China.

The species has a somewhat areolate to squamulose thallus and apothecia that are zeorine (having both thallus-like and proper margins) to lecanorine (surrounded by thallus-like margins) in form. Microscopic features of the species include an epihymenium (upper layer of the spore-producing tissue) without crystals around the expanded tips of the paraphyses (sterile filaments), and an amphithecium (outer tissue layer) containing large calcium oxalate crystals. It produces the secondary metabolite (lichen product) atranorin. In phylogenetic reconstructions, Lecanora zeorina is closely related to Lecanora crystalliniformis and is part of a lineage near soredia-forming Lecanora species such as L. barkmaniana and L. variolascens.

== See also ==
- List of Lecanora species
