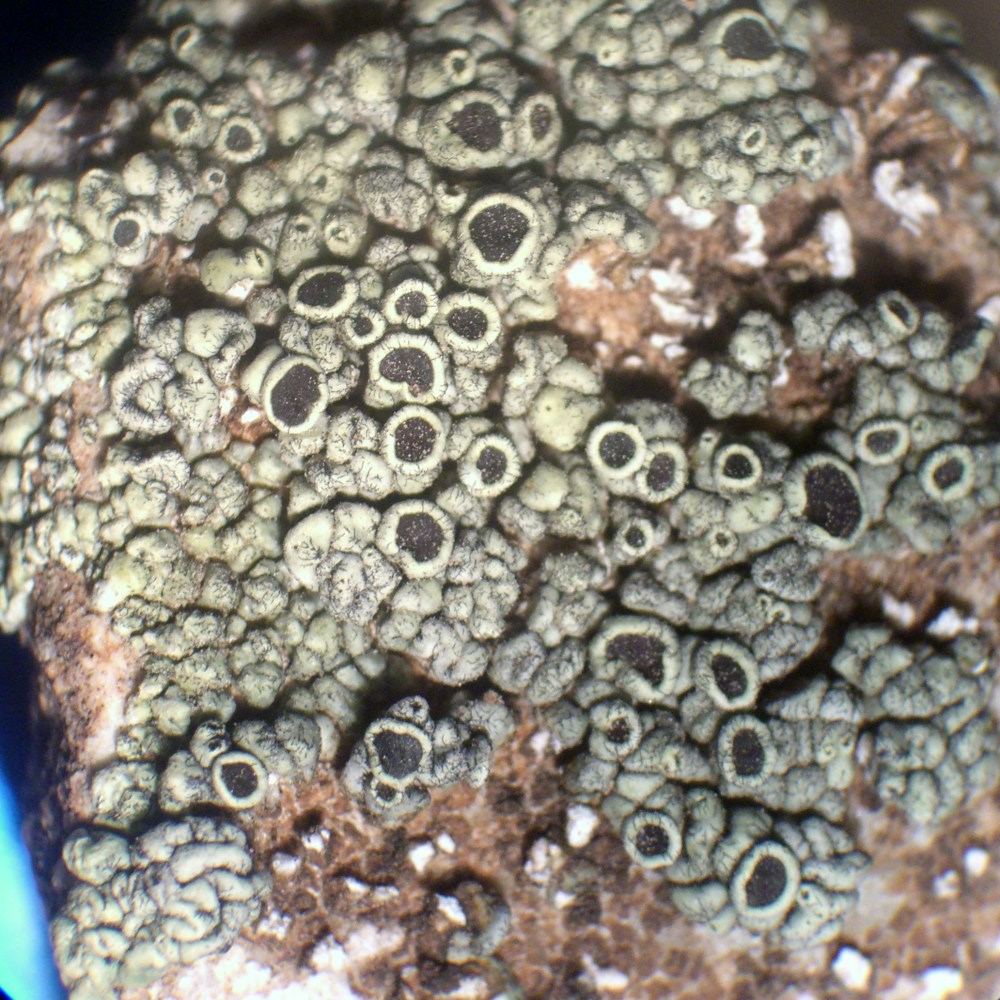
- 10X magnification

Conservation status
- Secure (NatureServe)

Scientific classification
- Kingdom: Fungi
- Division: Ascomycota
- Class: Lecanoromycetes
- Order: Lecanorales
- Family: Lecanoraceae
- Genus: Lecanora
- Species: L. argopholis

Binomial name
- Lecanora argopholis (Ach.) Ach. (1810)

Synonyms
- Parmelia atra var, argopholis Ach. (1803)

= Lecanora argopholis =

Species of lichen

Lecanora argopholis is a species of crustose lichen in the family Lecanoraceae. It was originally named Parmelia atra var. argopholis by Erik Acharius in 1803, then transferred by him to the genus Lecanora in 1810. The lichen has a circumpolar distribution.

== See also ==
- List of Lecanora species
