= Lecanora kalbii =

Scientific classification
- Domain: Eukaryota
- Kingdom: Fungi
- Division: Ascomycota
- Class: Lecanoromycetes
- Order: Lecanorales
- Family: Lecanoraceae
- Genus: Lecanora
- Species: L. kalbii

Binomial name
- Lecanora kalbii Bungartz & Elix (2020)

Species of lichen

Lecanora kalbii is a species of crustose lichen in the family Lecanoraceae. Found in the Galápagos Islands, it was described as a new species in 2020 by lichenologists Frank Bungartz and John Alan Elix. The specific epithet kalbii honours German lichenologist Klaus Kalb.

== See also ==
- List of Lecanora species
