= Lecanora markjohnstonii =

Scientific classification
- Domain: Eukaryota
- Kingdom: Fungi
- Division: Ascomycota
- Class: Lecanoromycetes
- Order: Lecanorales
- Family: Lecanoraceae
- Genus: Lecanora
- Species: L. markjohnstonii

Binomial name
- Lecanora markjohnstonii And.Stewart, E.Tripp & Lendemer (2018)

Species of lichen

Lecanora markjohnstonii is a species of crustose lichen in the family Lecanoraceae. Found in the southern Appalachian Mountain region of the United States, it was described as a new species in 2018 by Carly Anderson Stewart, Erin Tripp, and James Lendemer. The type specimen was collected from Little River Canyon National Preserve (Alabama), where it was found growing on sandstone on a steep slope at an elevation of 1,123 m (3,684 ft). The specific epithet honors Mark Johnston, an Episcopalian priest known for his contributions to environmental education and outreach in Alabama.

The lichen has a thin, light green to grayish-green crustose thallus when fresh. Closely related species include Lecanora masana and Lecanora orientoafricana.

== See also ==
- List of Lecanora species
