= Lecanora viridipruinosa =

Scientific classification
- Kingdom: Fungi
- Division: Ascomycota
- Class: Lecanoromycetes
- Order: Lecanorales
- Family: Lecanoraceae
- Genus: Lecanora
- Species: L. viridipruinosa

Binomial name
- Lecanora viridipruinosa M.Svenss. & T.Sprib. (2020)
- Holotype site: Excursion Ridge in Glacier Bay National Park

Species of lichen

Lecanora viridipruinosa is a rare species of crustose lichen in the family Lecanoraceae. Found in Alaska, it was formally described as a new species by the lichenologists Måns Svensson and Toby Spribille. The type specimen was collected from the Hoonah-Angoon Census Area in Glacier Bay National Park. Here it was found growing on exposed argillite rock in an alpine heath at an elevation of 920 m (3,020 ft). The specific epithet viridipruinosa refers to the greenish pruina on the discs of the apothecia. The lichen is only known to occur in the type locality.

== Description ==
Lecanora viridipruinosa forms a patchwork of separate, flat-topped areoles—tiny crust pieces 0.5–1.5 mm across—that sit tightly on the bark or rock. Each areole is dull white but may be ringed by a soot-black fringe of cyanobacteria. There is no visible mat (hypothallus) beneath the crust. Inside, the lichen's photosynthetic partner (photobiont is a single-celled green alga whose round cells are 8–15 μm in diameter.

The fruiting bodies (apothecia) appear one by one on the areoles. They begin half-buried but soon stand clear, 0.5–0.8 mm wide, with a smooth black disc and a matching, very thin rim. As they mature the discs swell into low domes and usually pick up a faint green frost (pruina); a drop of potassium hydroxide solution dissolves this green film. A microscopic section shows a 45–70 μm tall, clear hymenium topped by a green-tinged epihymenium. Slender, branching paraphyses thread this layer; their tips carry a cap of the same green pigment. Below lies a pale to orange-brown hypothecium that may trap the occasional algal cell. Each ascus is broadly club-shaped (clavate) and holds eight smooth, colorless ascospores. The spores are thick-walled, broadly ellipsoid, and measure about 10 × 5 μm, with no internal cross walls (septa).

No asexual reproductive structures are known. Standard spot tests give C−, K+ (yellow) on the thallus and HNO_{3}+ (red) on apothecial sections. Thin-layer chromatography detects the common lichen products atranorin and zeorin, but no other secondary metabolites. These features—white crust, green-dusted black apothecia, and thick-walled single-celled spores—make L. viridipruinosa recognizable among the many small, dark-disc Lecanora species.

== See also ==
- List of Lecanora species
