= Lecanora inaurata =

Scientific classification
- Domain: Eukaryota
- Kingdom: Fungi
- Division: Ascomycota
- Class: Lecanoromycetes
- Order: Lecanorales
- Family: Lecanoraceae
- Genus: Lecanora
- Species: L. inaurata

Binomial name
- Lecanora inaurata C.A.Morse & Ladd (2016)

Species of lichen

Lecanora inaurata is a species of crustose lichen in the family Lecanoraceae. Found in the United States, it was described as new to science in 2016 by Caleb Morse and Douglas Ladd. The lichen occurs in open hardwood-dominated woodlands of the Edwards Plateau and grasslands of the southern Great Plains in Oklahoma and Texas. It is a member of the L. subfusca group in genus Lecanora.

== See also ==
- List of Lecanora species
