= Lecanora zeroensis =

Scientific classification
- Kingdom: Fungi
- Division: Ascomycota
- Class: Lecanoromycetes
- Order: Lecanorales
- Family: Lecanoraceae
- Genus: Lecanora
- Species: L. zeroensis

Binomial name
- Lecanora zeroensis Lendemer (2011)
- Type locality: Little Satilla Wildlife Management Area, Georgia, US

Species of lichen-forming fungus

Lecanora zeroensis is a species of crustose lichen in the family Lecanoraceae. Described in 2011 from a forested wetland in southeastern Georgia, this bark-dwelling lichen forms a crust with dark reddish-brown apothecia (fruiting bodies) with prominent, smooth rims. The species is characterized by a reddish-brown upper layer of the hymenium (the spore-bearing tissue), the absence of a well-developed cortex (outer protective layer) on the rim of the apothecia, and the presence of norstictic acid. It is known only from its type locality near Zero Bay, and it may be overlooked elsewhere because it resembles the common Lecanora subfusca group.

== Taxonomy ==
Lecanora zeroensis was described as a new species in 2011 by James Lendemer, based on material collected in southeastern Georgia (Pierce County) at the Little Satilla Wildlife Management Area, between Zero Bay and Sixty Foot Branch. The type specimen (the reference specimen for the name) was collected on the bark of a maple (Acer) in December 2009 and is housed in the New York Botanical Garden herbarium.

The species epithet refers to Zero Bay, the type locality; in the original description, this place was characterized as a forested wetland associated with the Little Satilla River, even though no standing water was present.

In the field, L. zeroensis can be mistaken for members of the Lecanora subfusca group, in part because its epihymenium (the uppermost part of the spore-bearing layer) is distinctly reddish-brown. However, its exciple anatomy (the tissues that form the apothecial rim) was considered closer to the Lecanora caesiorubella complex, and they noted that its chemistry also aligns with that group. It was distinguished from similar taxa by a combination of an epruinose apothecial disc (lacking a powdery coating), a reddish-brown epihymenium, the lack of a well-developed cortex on the thalline margin (the rim made from thallus tissue) of the apothecia, and the presence of norstictic acid.

== Description ==
The thallus forms a crust that may be continuous or cracked into small patches (rimose-areolate). It lacks soredia (powdery vegetative propagules) and has a well-developed cortex. The algal layer beneath the cortex is uneven in thickness.

The apothecia are sessile (sitting directly on the thallus) and typically about 0.6–0.8 mm in diameter (though smaller and larger apothecia were also reported). The disc is dark reddish-brown and lacks pruina. The margin is lecanorine (formed from thallus tissue) and usually prominent and smooth. In cross-section, the proper exciple (the inner rim tissue) can appear as a distinct pale inner band. Under the microscope, the epihymenium is reddish-brown and contains crystals that dissolve in potassium hydroxide (K) solution. The hymenium and hypothecium are hyaline (colorless) and lack granular deposits (not inspersed). Paraphyses (sterile filaments among the asci) are simple to only weakly branched and not noticeably expanded at their tips. The asci are of the Lecanora-type (a standard ascus form) and produce eight hyaline, single-celled ascospores per ascus.

The photobiont (the photosynthetic partner) is a green, coccoid alga. Pycnidia were not observed in the type material.

Chemically, L. zeroensis contains three lichen substances: atranorin, norstictic acid, and connorstictic acid. Spot tests on the cortex and thalline apothecial margin were K+ (yellow turning red, often with red crystals), C−, KC−, P+ (yellow), and UV−.

== Habitat and distribution ==
Lecanora zeroensis is known only from the type locality in Georgia, where it was found growing on maple bark in a remnant hardwood strand wetland ("bayhead") crossed by a powerline corridor.

The species may occur elsewhere in the region but be overlooked because it resembles members of the Lecanora subfusca group. It was not encountered during extensive fieldwork in adjacent Florida.

== See also ==
- List of Lecanora species
