= Lecanora isidiotyla =

Scientific classification
- Kingdom: Fungi
- Division: Ascomycota
- Class: Lecanoromycetes
- Order: Lecanorales
- Family: Lecanoraceae
- Genus: Lecanora
- Species: L. isidiotyla

Binomial name
- Lecanora isidiotyla Vain. (1913)

Species of lichen-forming fungus

Lecanora isidiotyla is a species of crustose lichen in the family Lecanoraceae. It was first discovered on Mount Apo in the Philippines, growing at elevations around 1,800 metres above sea level. The lichen can be identified by its whitish, continuous surface covered with small cylindrical structures called isidia, which help it reproduce vegetatively. Like other members of its genus, it forms a thin crust on its substrate and produces modest-sized fruiting bodies (apothecia) with pale, brownish discs.

== Taxonomy ==
Lecanora isidiotyla was described by the Finnish lichenologist Edvard August Vainio in 1913. Vainio's account treats it as a distinct Lecanora based on an isidiate thallus and a characteristic set of spot test and microscopic features recorded from Mindanao material.

== Description ==
Lecanora isidiotyla is a crustose lichen. The thallus is whitish and continuous, looking mostly smooth but sometimes slightly warted; it is K− and C− in spot tests. It bears abundant isidia—small, cylindrical outgrowths about 0.5 mm long and 0.1 mm wide, usually simple but sometimes a little branched—and it lacks soredia. The medulla is white and I− (does not colour with iodine), and the hypothallus is indistinct.

The fruiting bodies (apothecia) are closely attached and modest in size, about 1 mm across (only juvenile apothecia were seen). The disc is concave to nearly flat, livid-brownish to pale livid, thinly pruinose and opaque. The rim is thin yet prominent, rising above the disc; it is shallowly crenulate to nearly entire and the same colour as the thallus, and its inner face may bear sparse isidia. In section the apothecium is terete. Inside, the hypothecium is whitish to tawny and K−; the hymenium is I+ (persistently blue in iodine); the epithecium is decolourate and K−; and the paraphyses are tightly coherent with very slender lumina. Asci are clavate; spores were not seen.

== Habitat and distribution ==
Vainio described the species from material collected on Mount Apo in the Davao Region of Mindanao, Philippines, at an elevation of about 1,800 m. The type collection was made by Edwin Copeland (no. 1090), and the protologue does not mention a substrate. Lecanora merrillii is one of 14 Lecanora species that have been recorded from the Philippines, and one of three in the genus that was first described from specimens collected in the country.

== See also ==
- List of Lecanora species
