= Lecanora layana =

Scientific classification
- Kingdom: Fungi
- Division: Ascomycota
- Class: Lecanoromycetes
- Order: Lecanorales
- Family: Lecanoraceae
- Genus: Lecanora
- Species: L. layana

Binomial name
- Lecanora layana Lendemer (2015)

Species of lichen-forming fungus

Lecanora layana is a sorediate species of crustose lichen. It was first described by American lichenologist James Lendemer in 2015, who named the species in honor of Elizabeth Lay, a lichenologist (and a founding member of the Tuckerman Lichen Workshop) from Boston, Massachusetts, USA, who has been devoted to documenting lichen biodiversity of the northeastern US where this species grows.

== Description ==
Sorediate lichens are asexual and have reproductive structures called soredia. L. layana is crustose and has an endosubstratal thallus. The soredia measure from 14.3 to 40.4 μm. The lichen has a white color away from the edge and a dark blue to green color near the edge. L. layana is similar and taxonomically close to Lecanora nothocaesiella but L. layana produces atranorin, zeorin, and stictic acid. The production of these chemicals is unique to this species, and it is the only sordieate Lecanora to do so. Additional spot test results include, K+ (yellow), KC−, C−, P+ (orange), UV−, and N+ (red).

== Habitat and locality ==
This lichen is widespread in eastern North America, in high humidity areas (for example, swamps and riparian corridors), usually on bark of hardwood trees like maple and oak.

== See also ==
- List of Lecanora species
