= Lecanora lecideopsis =

Scientific classification
- Kingdom: Fungi
- Division: Ascomycota
- Class: Lecanoromycetes
- Order: Lecanorales
- Family: Lecanoraceae
- Genus: Lecanora
- Species: L. lecideopsis

Binomial name
- Lecanora lecideopsis Cl.Roux & C.Coste (2019)

Species of lichen

Lecanora lecideopsis is a rare species of saxicolous (rock-dwelling), crustose lichen in the family Lecanoraceae. It is known only from a couple of locations in France, where it grows on gneiss, a non-calcareous rock. It is named for its similarity with Lecanora lecideoides, from which it differs by its green to greenish-brown epithecium, its different chemistry, and its much narrower, oblong or long ellipsoid spores typically measuring 12–14, 4–16 by 3.5–4.0–4.5 μm.

== Taxonomy ==
Lecanora lecideopsis was formally described as a new species in 2019 by lichenologists Claude Roux and Clother Coste. The description was based on specimens collected in 1988 by Coste from Mons, located in the Hérault department of southern France. Initially, the specimens were thought to resemble Lecanora lecideoides, a closely related species. However, preliminary chemical tests indicated significant differences, prompting further investigation.

Due to time constraints and other commitments, the formal description of this lichen was delayed for over 30 years. In the intervening period, extensive microscopic and chemical analyses were carried out, involving multiple lichenologists across Europe. These analyses confirmed the uniqueness of the species. The holotype—the primary reference specimen used for describing the species—is stored in the MARSSJ herbarium in France.

The specific name lecideopsis derives from the Greek term "opsis" (meaning appearance) combined with "Lecidea", referring to the genus Lecidea, thus indicating its superficial resemblance to lichens of that genus despite belonging to Lecanora.

Lecanora lecideopsis belongs to the Lecanora subfusca group, a large and complex cluster of species identified by their crust-like growth form and the presence of particular chemical compounds such as atranorin. Although superficially similar to some other lichens within this group, Lecanora lecideopsis stands apart due to its distinctive chemical reactions, narrower spores, and unique microscopic features, particularly the colour reactions observed in the surface layer of its fruiting bodies.

== Description ==
Lecanora lecideopsis is a crustose lichen, meaning it forms a crust-like growth closely attached to its rock substrate. Its thallus—the main body of the lichen—is large and typically pale, varying from whitish to a soft yellowish colour. It is composed of irregular patches (known as areoles or warts) that range from 0.15 to 2.5 mm across and may reach up to 1.2 mm in thickness. These patches are separated by cracks, sometimes grouping together into clusters that resemble small granular scales.

When viewed under a microscope, the thallus reveals a detailed inner structure. The upper surface (cortex) includes a thin, dead outer layer, beneath which lies a living layer made up of fungal filaments arranged vertically, somewhat like a tiny fence (a structure known as palisade plectenchyma). Below this cortex is a layer containing green algae cells arranged in scattered clusters. The deepest part (medulla) is composed of loosely arranged fungal filaments interspersed with crystals.

The reproductive structures (apothecia) of Lecanora lecideopsis are small, disc-shaped bodies measuring between 0.35 and 1.1 mm in diameter. Initially level with the thallus surface, they gradually become slightly raised. The disc of each apothecium is usually dark, appearing blackish or dark brown, with a dull, matt surface that may become increasingly convex as the lichen matures. Apothecia have a narrow margin, initially the same colour as the disc, which becomes less visible as they age.

Microscopic examination reveals that the apothecia contain reproductive structures (asci) holding spores. Each ascus typically carries eight colourless spores, which are elongated to ellipsoid in shape and measure roughly 12–16 μm long by 3.5–4.5 μm wide. Thin, filamentous structures called paraphyses, topped with greenish to greenish-brown pigments, surround and support these asci. The lichen lacks separate asexual reproductive structures (conidiomata).

Chemically, the thallus reacts K+ (yellow turning red), C−, and P+ (orange) due to the presence of substances like atranorin and norstictic acid. The surface of the apothecia is K+ (purple).

== Habitat and distribution ==
Lecanora lecideopsis is found in sunny, Mediterranean habitats, particularly favouring calcareous (limestone-rich) rock surfaces. It grows mainly on exposed rocky slopes or vertical rock faces in open landscapes, frequently coexisting with other crustose lichen species adapted to similar dry, sunny conditions. As of its formal description in 2019, the known range of this species is limited to southern France, with confirmed occurrences from the Hérault and Gard departments.

== See also ==
- List of Lecanora species
