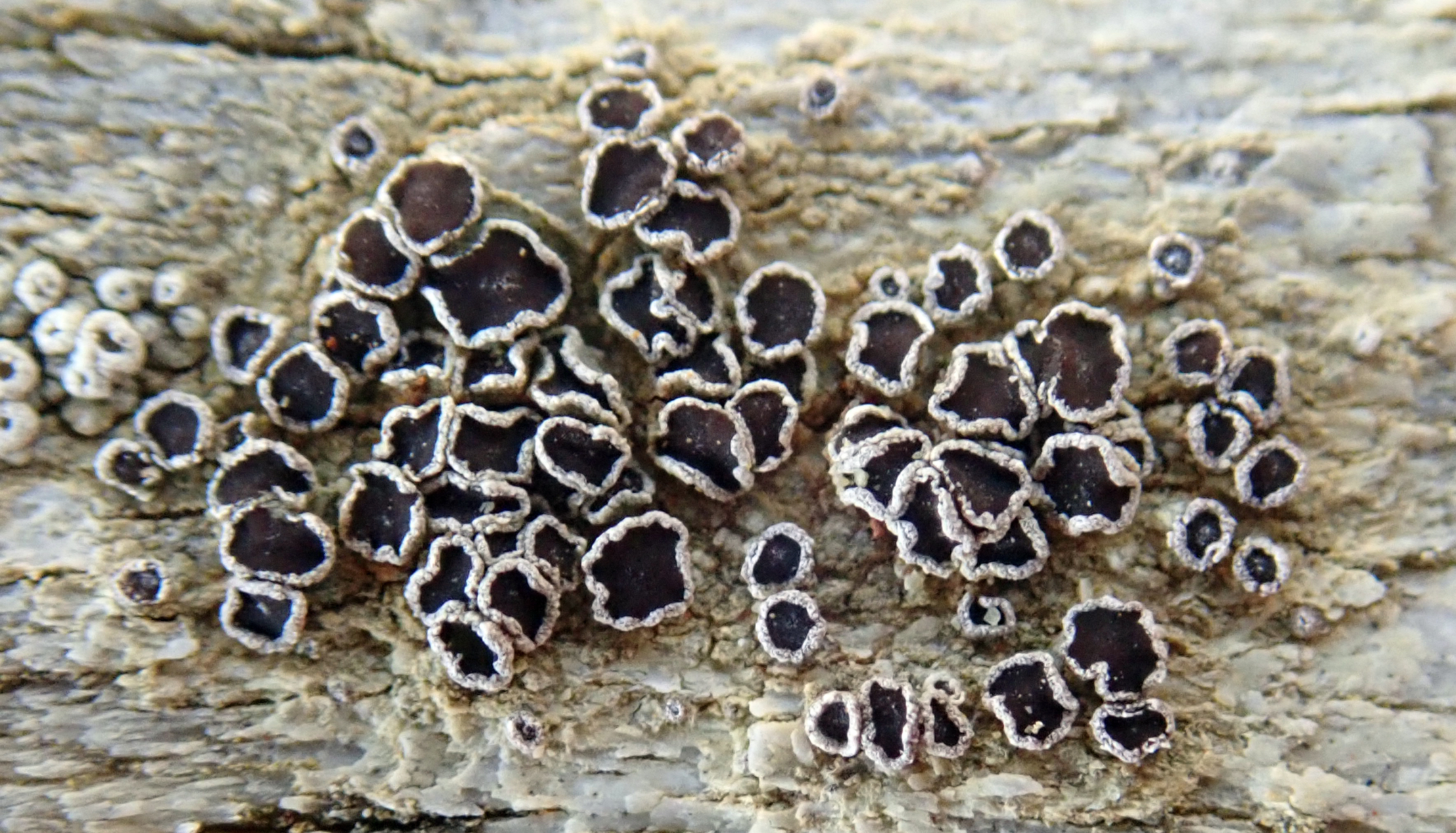

Conservation status
- Vulnerable (NatureServe)

Scientific classification
- Kingdom: Fungi
- Division: Ascomycota
- Class: Lecanoromycetes
- Order: Lecanorales
- Family: Lecanoraceae
- Genus: Lecanora
- Species: L. xylophila

Binomial name
- Lecanora xylophila Hue (1915)

= Lecanora xylophila =

Species of lichen

Lecanora xylophila is a crustose lichen in the family Lecanoraceae, first described by Auguste-Marie Hue in 1915.

== See also ==
- List of Lecanora species
