= Lecanora achroa =

Scientific classification
- Domain: Eukaryota
- Kingdom: Fungi
- Division: Ascomycota
- Class: Lecanoromycetes
- Order: Lecanorales
- Family: Lecanoraceae
- Genus: Lecanora
- Species: L. achroa

Binomial name
- Lecanora achroa Nyl. (1876)

Species of crustose lichen

Lecanora achroa is a species of crustose lichen in the family Lecanoraceae. It was originally described in 1876 by Finnish botanist William Nylander from specimens collected in Rodrigues, Mauritius. The lichen is found in Australia, New Zealand, Papua New Guinea, and North and South America.

== Description ==
Lecanora achroa has a yellowish gray to greenish gray, crustose thallus that lies atop a blackish-brown prothallus. The apothecia are sessile, and disc-shaped, measuring 0.3–0.8 mm (0.01–0.03 in) in diameter, with orange-brown discs. The ascospores are more or less ellipsoid in shape, measuring 10.5–16.5 by 6.5–8.6 μm.

The major secondary compounds found in Lecanora achroa are atranorin, 2'-O-methylperlatolic acid, and usnic acid. Species with a similar morphology include Lecanora helva and Lecanora leprosa, since both of them also have small apothecia with orange-brown discs. The Brazilian lichen Lecanora parachroa has morphological and anatomical features that are quite similar to L. achroa, but it differs in secondary chemistry, as it produces neither usnic acid nor 2′-O-methylperlatolic acid.

== See also ==
- List of Lecanora species
