= Nimisora =

Scientific classification
- Kingdom: Fungi
- Division: Ascomycota
- Class: Lecanoromycetes
- Order: Lecanorales
- Family: Lecanoraceae
- Genus: Nimisora; Pérez-Ort., M.Svenss. & J.C.Zamora (2023)
- Species: N. iberica

Binomial name
- Nimisora iberica Pérez-Ort., Turégano, M.Svenss. & J.C.Zamora (2023)

Single-species lichen genus

Nimisora is a fungal genus in the family Lecanoraceae. It comprises the single species Nimisora iberica, a crustose lichen. The genus was established in 2023 to formally recognise a common lichen found on tree twigs in central Spain that had previously been confused with several other similar species.

== Taxonomy ==
Nimisora is a monospecific (single-species) genus that was introduced in 2023 by Sergio Pérez-Ortega, Yolanda Turégano, Måns Svensson and Juan Carlos Zamora to accommodate a previously misinterpreted lecideoid epiphyte that is common on twigs in the central Iberian Peninsula. The type and only species, Nimisora iberica, was described at the same time from material collected mainly on Cistus ladanifer and evergreen oaks. The genus name honours Pier Luigi Nimis on the occasion of his 70th birthday, recognising his long-standing contributions to Mediterranean lichenology.

The species now placed in Nimisora had earlier been reported from Spain under names such as Lecidea exigua (now treated as Traponora varians) and Lecidea aff. erythrophaea, and the authors suggest that Mediterranean records of those names from the Iberian Peninsula should be re-evaluated in light of the new genus. Molecular analyses show that Nimisora forms a strongly supported, distinct lineage within the Lecanoraceae, but its deeper relationships within the family remain unclear. In the available phylogeny, the clade of Nimisora samples appears near species of Ramboldia, but that relationship lacks statistical support, and the genus is therefore treated as an isolated lineage within the family. Morphological comparison indicates that Nimisora differs from superficially similar lecideoid genera such as Lecidella, Palicella, Japewiella, Japewia and Traponora in its combination of a thick-walled, radially arranged proper exciple with swollen hyphal tips, a Bacidia-like ascus, the presence of an unusual brown K+ (olive-green) pigment in the epihymenium and exciple, broadly ellipsoid simple ascospores, and the apparent absence of lichen secondary metabolites detectable by thin-layer chromatography.

== Description ==
Nimisora iberica forms a thin, crustose bark-dwelling thallus that breaks up into fine granules or tiny areoles only a few millimetres across, usually forming small patches a few centimetres long; the thallus is greenish grey to pale grey or whitish (greener when wet), matt and finely granular to areolate, without a distinct cortex or any vegetative propagules such as soralia or isidia, and contains a simple green, single-celled photobiont scattered through the thallus down to the bark surface. Apothecia (fruiting bodies) are usually abundant and lecideoid in form, starting off slightly immersed but soon becoming sessile and clearly set on the thallus; they are small (about 0.3–0.6 mm across), with a flat to slightly convex, dull, non-pruinose disc that can vary from pale cream-brown to dark reddish brown, surrounded by a persistent dark brown to almost black margin.

The proper exciple is built from radiating, thick-walled hyphae with swollen, heavily pigmented tips, and the outer exciple and epihymenium contain a characteristic brown to dark green pigment that changes colour in standard chemical tests, whereas the hypothecium remains colourless and relatively low. The hymenium is clear and strongly amyloid in iodine, the asci are clavate with a Bacidia-like amyloid apex, and the paraphyses are simple to sparingly branched with slightly thickened, darkly pigmented tips; the ascospores are simple, broadly ellipsoid, colourless and usually straight, typically measuring about 10–15 μm long by 4–7 μm wide. No asexual reproductive structures have been seen, and thin-layer chromatography did not reveal any lichen secondary metabolites in the thallus or apothecia.

== Habitat and distribution ==
Nimisora iberica is an epiphytic lichen that grows on the bark of shrubs and trees in Mediterranean woodland and scrub. It is especially frequent on the small twigs of gum rockrose (Cistus ladanifer) and the evergreen holm oak (Quercus rotundifolia), and is also recorded from Portuguese oak (Quercus pyrenaica), occasional conifer twigs (Pinus radiata) and dead branches. The species is currently known from several provinces in Spain, including multiple localities in the Madrid region, La Rioja and Castilla–La Mancha, mostly in the supramediterranean belt of the Iberian Peninsula between roughly 680 and 1,100 m elevation. Within this zone it appears to be a common component of the twig lichen funga but has probably been overlooked because it was previously assigned to other lecideoid names.

The lichen typically occupies exposed or semi-exposed twigs in open oak woods, mixed forests and dense stands of Cistus on acidic substrates such as gneiss and granite. It occurs together with a characteristic suite of Mediterranean twig lichens, including Blastenia xerothermica, Evernia prunastri, Glaucomaria carpinea, Lecanora chlarotera, L. varia, Lecidella elaeochroma, L. euphorea, Melanohalea exasperata, Physcia adscendens, Rinodina pyrina and R. sophodes. Nimisora iberica also serves as the primary host of the lichenicolous (lichen-dwelling) basidiomycete fungus Tremella diederichiana, which produces tiny whitish galls on the thallus; this association first drew attention to the species and helped prompt its formal description as a distinct taxon.
