= Parmelia submutata =

Scientific classification
- Kingdom: Fungi
- Division: Ascomycota
- Class: Lecanoromycetes
- Order: Lecanorales
- Family: Parmeliaceae
- Genus: Parmelia
- Species: P. submutata

Binomial name
- Parmelia submutata Hue (1899)

Synonyms
- Parmelia rhododendri Zahlbr. 1930); Parmelia leiocarpodes Zahlbr. (1934)

Species of lichen-forming fungus

Parmelia submutata is a species of corticolous (bark-dwelling) foliose lichen in the family Parmeliaceae. Described from Yunnan, China in 1899, this lichen has since been found across high-elevation regions of Asia, including Taiwan and Nepal, where it grows on tree bark in pine–Rhododendron forests at high elevations. The species forms greenish-grey growths typically 8–12 cm across and is characterized by its shiny surface that becomes finely cracked with age, numerous small pale pores, and densely branched root-like structures on the black undersurface—features that help distinguish it from the closely related Parmelia meiophora.

== Taxonomy ==
Parmelia submutata was described in 1899 by the French lichenologist Auguste-Marie Hue from bark collected by Père Jean Marie Delavay in the forests of San-tchang-kiou, Yunnan, China, on 27 March 1890. Later names—Parmelia rhododendri (Zahlbruckner 1930) and Parmelia leiocarpodes (Zahlbruckner 1934)—are treated as synonyms. Mason Hale regarded P. submutata as the parent morph of P. meiophora: Zahlbruckner had already noticed the dendroid (tree-like)-branched rhizines in this taxon, but he did not interpret the fine surface reticulations as laminal pseudocyphellae, which Hale considered diagnostic.

== Description ==
The thallus of Parmelia submutata is adnate to closely adnate, firm, and greenish mineral grey in the field (often browning in the herbarium), typically 8–12 cm across. Lobes are sub-irregular to more or less linear, overlapping (imbricate), and 2–5 mm wide. The upper surface is shiny and plane but becomes finely, reticulately cracked with age; small laminal pseudocyphellae are numerous and measure about 0.1–0.2 mm. The lower surface is black and densely rhizinate; rhizines are simple to densely squarrosely branched and 1–1.5 mm long. Pycnidia are poorly developed; conidia are cylindrical, straight, and 6–8 μm long (reported by Zahlbruckner for P. rhododendri type material). Apothecia are common, adnate to short-stalked (substipitate), 3–5 mm in diameter, with a smooth amphithecium and a brown disc; the hymenium is 45–50 μm tall; ascospores are 3–5 × 6–9 μm with an epispore about 1 μm thick. The chemistry includes lichen products: atranorin, salazinic acid, and consalazinic acid, with norstictic acid present or absent.

== Habitat and distribution ==
Hale considered P. submutata more widespread than P. meiophora, but occupying broadly similar habitats—high-elevation pine–Rhododendron forests. Confirmed records include Yunnan (type area) and Taiwan (Yilan, Mt Chien-San, Mt Arisan, Taichung County), and it has been reported from Nepal, at 2,800 m elevation in a compilation of published records. In Taiwanese material examined by Hale, about one-third of specimens contained relatively high concentrations of norstictic acid.
