= Adelolecia kolaensis =

Scientific classification
- Domain: Eukaryota
- Kingdom: Fungi
- Division: Ascomycota
- Class: Lecanoromycetes
- Order: Lecanorales
- Family: Lecanoraceae
- Genus: Adelolecia
- Species: A. kolaensis

Binomial name
- Adelolecia kolaensis (Nyl.) Hertel & Rambold (1995)

Synonyms
- Lecidea kolaënsis Nyl. (1863)

Species of fungus

Adelolecia kolaensis is a species of crustose lichen belonging to the family Lecanoraceae.

It is native to Europe and Northern America.
