= Bryonora granulata =

Scientific classification
- Kingdom: Fungi
- Division: Ascomycota
- Class: Lecanoromycetes
- Order: Lecanorales
- Family: Lecanoraceae
- Genus: Bryonora
- Species: B. granulata

Binomial name
- Bryonora granulata Fryday (2012)

Species of lichen

Bryonora granulata is a species of lichen in the family Lecanoraceae. Found on the Falkland Islands, it was described as a new species in 2012 by Alan Fryday. It has a finely granular thallus (after which it is named) and contains the secondary metabolite (lichen product) perlatolic acid.
