= Myriolecis carlottiana =

Conservation status
- Imperiled (NatureServe)

Scientific classification
- Kingdom: Fungi
- Division: Ascomycota
- Class: Lecanoromycetes
- Order: Lecanorales
- Family: Lecanoraceae
- Genus: Myriolecis
- Species: M. carlottiana

Binomial name
- Myriolecis carlottiana (Lewis & Śliwa) Śliwa, Zhao Xin & Lumbsch

Species of lichen

Myriolecis carlottiana is a species of lichen found in North America. M. carlottiana has been found in the Great Lakes region along the Niagara Escarpment in Ontario up to Manitoulin Island, and in New York State.

Myriolecis carlottiana was first described in 2012 by Lewis and Śliwa.

Myriolecis carlottiana is usually found on shaded, sheltered, north-easterly calcareous cliffs. They are commonly found in forests dominated by northern white-cedar. They tend to be found near water, but in areas sheltered by the rain, sun and wind.
