= Miriquidica gyrizans =

Scientific classification
- Domain: Eukaryota
- Kingdom: Fungi
- Division: Ascomycota
- Class: Lecanoromycetes
- Order: Lecanorales
- Family: Lecanoraceae
- Genus: Miriquidica
- Species: M. gyrizans

Binomial name
- Miriquidica gyrizans Fryday (2020)

Species of lichen

Miriquidica gyrizans is a species of lichen-forming fungus in the family Lecanoraceae. It is found in Alaska and the Yukon, where it grows on granitic boulders.

== Taxonomy ==
The lichen was described as a new species in 2020 by British lichenologist Alan Fryday. The type specimen was collected in the Hoonah-Angoon Census Area, of Glacier Bay National Park (Alaska, on a mountain west of Dundas Bay. Here it was found growing on the upper surface of a flat granitic boulder on an alpine ridge at an altitude of 460 m (1,510 ft). DNA analysis of specimens from the type locality confirm a placement in the genus Miriquidica, although there is not yet enough known about other members of the genus to clarify any closer phylogenetic relationships.

== Description ==
The thallus of Miriquidica gyrizans has no definite boundaries, consisting of areoles (small, rounded to polygonal or irregular areas) that are either contiguous or dispersed. These areoles, which measure 0.1–0.2 mm across, are pale brown with a layer of dead fungal cells that imparts a grey tinge. Areoles associate with the cyanobacteria Gloeocapsa, whose reddish cells–measuring 7.5 to 12.5 μm in diameter–group together in groups of two to four. The mycobiont partner of the lichen is chlorococcoid (i.e. green algae with a spherical shape), with dimensions of 5‒9 μm in diameter.

The apothecia of the lichen are black, measuring 0.4‒0.6 mm in diameter. It has a lecideine form, meaning that it is black, with a carbonaceous (blackened) exciple and blackish disc. The disc, when young, has an umbo that becomes more or less completely gyrose (spiralled, with a folded or ridged surface). It is this last feature that is alluded to in the specific epithet gyrizans. Miriquidica gyrizans is the only member of genus Miriquidica to have this characteristic.

The results of standard chemical spot tests are negative with this lichen, but miriquidic acid can be detected using thin-layer chromatography.

== Habitat and distribution ==
Miriquidica gyrizans grows on granitic boulders in alpine and subalpine areas. It typically on the top of the rock, but sometimes on the sides in lower elevations. In addition to the type locality in Glacier Bay National Park, Alaska, the lichen has been recorded from the Klondike Gold Rush National Historical Park and from Kenai Fjords National Park.
