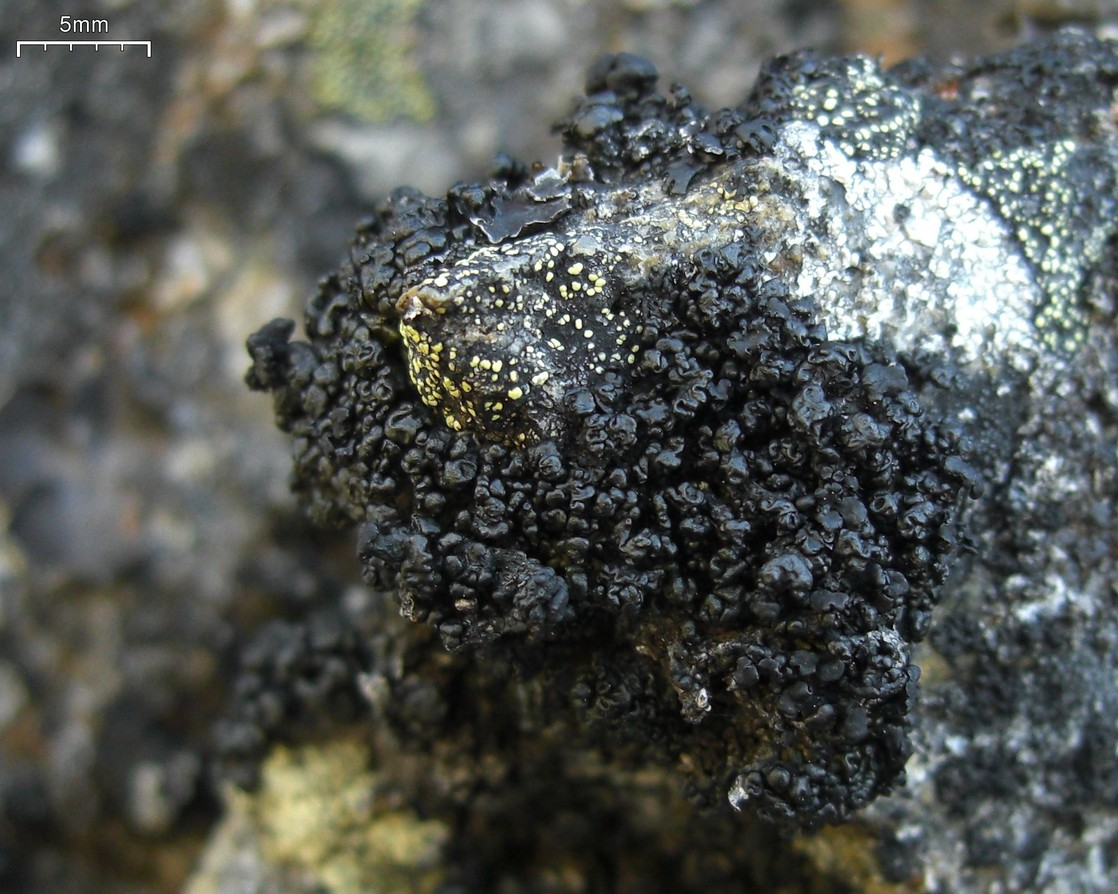
- in Wells Gray Provincial Park, British Columbia

Conservation status
- Vulnerable (NatureServe)

Scientific classification
- Kingdom: Fungi
- Division: Ascomycota
- Class: Lecanoromycetes
- Order: Lecanorales
- Family: Lecanoraceae
- Genus: Pulvinora
- Species: P. pringlei

Binomial name
- Pulvinora pringlei (Tuck.) Davydov, Yakovch., Hollinger, Bungartz & Printzen (2021)

Synonyms
- Lecidea pringlei Tuck. (1883); Lecanora pringlei (Tuck.) I.M.Lamb (1939)

= Pulvinora pringlei =

Species of lichen-forming fungus

Pulvinora pringlei (also known by its former name Lecanora pringlei) is a species of saxicolous (rock-dwelling) crustose lichen in the family Lecanoraceae. It has a distinctive cushion-forming thallus (lichen body) and black apothecia (fruiting bodies) that become strongly domed as they mature. The species is known from North America.

== Taxonomy ==
The species was first described in 1883 by Edward Tuckerman as Lecidea pringlei. It was later transferred to Lecanora as Lecanora pringlei by Elke Mackenzie.

Work on the "Lecanora pringlei group" led to its removal from Lecanora in the broad sense. In 2021, the genus Pulvinora was established for this lineage, and the species was recombined as Pulvinora pringlei. A later study using a three-locus phylogeny (mtSSU, nuITS, and nuLSU) supported this placement and showed that Lecanora cavicola and L. subcavicola form a strongly supported sister clade to P. pringlei and the Eurasian P. stereothallina, supporting an expanded circumscription of Pulvinora.

== Description ==
Pulvinora pringlei forms small cushions made of short, branched, stalk-like outgrowths whose tips end in convex, scale-like units (squamules). Its apothecia are black and strongly convex; they retain a thalline rim but have the algal layer displaced beneath the spore-producing tissues.

The apothecia are typically solitary, and the colorless ascospores measure about 7.5–10.0 × 3.0–4.5 μm. Chemically, the species contains atranorin together with alectorialic and psoromic acids, and it may also contain norstictic acid.

== Habitat and distribution ==
This is a rock-dwelling lichen known from North America.
