= Japewiella dollypartoniana =

Scientific classification
- Kingdom: Fungi
- Division: Ascomycota
- Class: Lecanoromycetes
- Order: Lecanorales
- Family: Lecanoraceae
- Genus: Japewiella
- Species: J. dollypartoniana

Binomial name
- Japewiella dollypartoniana J.L.Allen & Lendemer (2015)

Species of lichen

Japewiella dollypartoniana is a species of crustose lichen in the family Lecanoraceae. It is widely distributed in the Appalachian Mountains of eastern North America, and has also been reported from Ontario, Canada. The lichen grows on tree branches and sapling and shrub stems at middle to high elevations.

== Taxonomy ==
The lichen was formally described as a new species in 2015 by Jessica Allen and James Lendemer. The type specimen was found in the Joyce Kilmer-Slickrock Wilderness area of Nantahala National Forest in North Carolina. Here it was found growing on an exposed rock in a heath bald community dominated by ericaceous shrubs such as Rhododendron, Vaccinium, and Kalmia, at an altitude of 5,160 ft (1,570 m).

The specific epithet honors Dolly Parton, described by the authors as "one of the most famous country singers of all time and a native of the southern Appalachians".

== Description ==
Japewiella dollypartoniana is a crustose lichen with a more or less circular greenish-gray to brown thallus measuring up to 2–6 cm (0.8–2.4 in), although sometimes neighbouring thalli coalesce to form larger aggregates. The thallus features soralia that break through the surface, comprising discrete spherical soredia that are in the size range 10–50 μm. Apothecia have been rarely documented in this species, known only from a few populations on Haoe Mountain. Secondary chemicals found in the lichen are norstictic and connorstictic acids.

The species Lambiella fuscosora is another sorediate crustose lichen that produces norstictic acid. In 2017, it was reported as new to North America based on sterile material from Eagle Hill in Maine (United States) and Ontario (Canada). Re-examination of the specimens showed that they were in fact Japewiella dollypartoniana, extending the range of this lichen to Canada.
