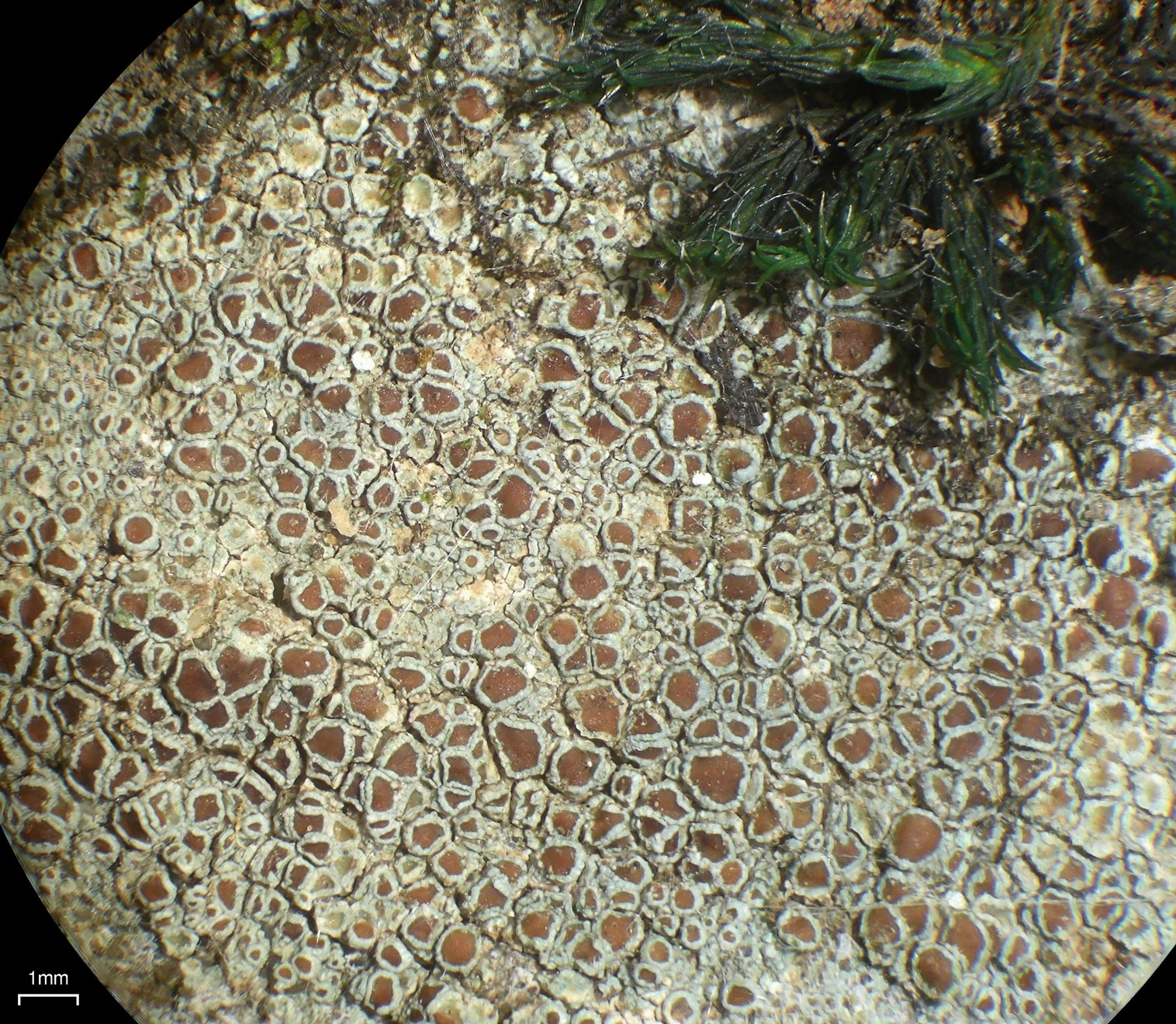

Scientific classification
- Domain: Eukaryota
- Kingdom: Fungi
- Division: Ascomycota
- Class: Lecanoromycetes
- Order: Lecanorales
- Family: Lecanoraceae
- Genus: Lecanora
- Species: L. subimmergens

Binomial name
- Lecanora subimmergens Vain. (1921)

= Lecanora subimmergens =

Species of lichen

Lecanora subimmergens is a species of saxicolous (rock-dwelling) crustose lichen in the family Lecanoraceae. It is widely distributed, occurring in Asia, America, and Australasia.

== Taxonomy ==
It was described as new to science by the Finnish naturalist Edvard August Vainio in 1921. In his protologue, Vainio described the lichen as having a moderately thickened, smooth, areolate to cracked thallus composed of small, pale greyish-white, opaque areoles. He noted that the thallus had a yellowish reaction (lutescent) with potassium hydroxide solution (the K test), subsequently turning brownish. Vainio described the apothecia (fruiting bodies) as small, measuring 0.5–0.8 mm in diameter, initially immersed in the substrate but eventually slightly emergent, with a plane to occasionally slightly convex disc. The disc was reddish, smooth, slightly shiny, and had a thin, smooth margin, which was entire or rarely slightly flexuous. Internally, the hypothecium appeared pale, and the hymenium was approximately 70 μm thick, displaying a persistent blue reaction with iodine. Spores were described as colourless, simple, ellipsoid, measuring roughly 7 by 6 μm, with rounded ends. Paraphyses were closely coherent, thin, with reddish-brown epithecium. Vainio distinguished this species from related taxa by its smooth thallus and mostly immersed apothecia. The type specimen was collected from rock in Kōzuke Province, Japan.

== Habitat and distribution ==
Lecanora subimmergens is a saxicolous lichen with a nearly cosmopolitan distribution. It occurs in Asia, America, and Australasia.

== See also ==
- List of Lecanora species
