= Palicella lueckingii =

Scientific classification
- Domain: Eukaryota
- Kingdom: Fungi
- Division: Ascomycota
- Class: Lecanoromycetes
- Order: Lecanorales
- Family: Lecanoraceae
- Genus: Palicella
- Species: P. lueckingii

Binomial name
- Palicella lueckingii Rodr.Flakus (2018)

Species of lichen

Palicella lueckingii is a species of corticolous (bark-dwelling) lecideoid lichen in the family Lecanoraceae. Found in Chile, it was formally described as a new species in 2018 by Pamela Rodriguez-Flakus. The type specimen was collected from the Malalcahuelo National Reserve, where it was found growing on the bark of Araucaria araucana in Valdivian temperate rain forest. It is only known to occur at the type locality. The species epithet honours German lichenologist Robert Lücking, "who has made an outstanding contribution to the knowledge of Neotropical lichens".

Characteristic features of Palicella lueckingii include its thick thallus, apothecia lacking pruina, and small ascospores (measuring 10.5–15.5 by 5–6 μm). Lichen products that occur in this species are atranorin, pannarin, and thiophanic acid.
