= Xanthosyne =

Scientific classification
- Kingdom: Fungi
- Division: Ascomycota
- Class: Lecanoromycetes
- Order: Lecanorales
- Family: Lecanoraceae
- Genus: Xanthosyne; Lendemer, R.C.Harris, Brodo & McMullin (2024)

Type species
- Xanthosyne granularis R.C.Harris (2024)

Species
- X. granularis X. sharnoffiorum X. varians

Single-species fungal genus

Xanthosyne is fungal genus in the family Lecanoraceae. The genus was established in 2024 to accommodate a group of crustose lichens that had previously been classified under various names, most notably as Lecidea varians, which was originally described in 1814. These lichens form thin crusts on tree bark and are characterised by their variable appearance, ranging from pale grey to yellow-green, with small black fruiting bodies and diverse chemical compositions. The genus is most commonly found in the humid temperate forests of eastern North America, though it also occurs in parts of California and southern Europe.

== Taxonomy ==
Genus Xanthosyne was established in 2024 to accommodate the morphologically and chemically variable species long known as Lecidea varians. Earlier workers had shunted that species among several lecideoid genera, but molecular phylogenetics analyses, coupled with a broad survey of secondary metabolites and thallus structure, showed that it stands alone on its own branch within the family. Those results led Irwin Brodo and colleagues to coin the name Xanthosyne with X. varians as the type and, in a narrow sense, its sole member.

The basionym Lecidea varians was described by Erik Acharius in 1814, and became a textbook example of the difficulties involved in classifying lecideoid lichens. Through the twentieth century it was shuffled through Pyrrhospora, Lecidella and, most recently, Traponora, yet none of those placements survived scrutiny once multi-gene phylogenies became available. Irwin Brodo and co-workers demonstrated that the species forms an isolated lineage in the Lecanoraceae, distant from any established genus; they therefore erected Xanthosyne to provide a stable classification. While their revision recognised several segregates and subspecies on molecular grounds, many floras still treat the group as a single, variable species, leaving the genus monotypic in practice.

Despite the current one-species concept, the authors recovered at least eight well-supported clades within X. varians, each tied to a distinctive cocktail of lichen products such as atranorin, thuringione, arthothelin or thiophanic acid. Because the chemical patterns only partly track morphology or geography, they retained the units at subspecific rather than specific rank, pending broader sampling across the genus's range.

== Description ==
Xanthosyne varians forms an effuse, thin to moderately thick crust on the bark of hardwoods and, less frequently, conifers. The thallus ranges from pale grey to yellow-green, sometimes becoming patchily leprose or granular, a reflection of its diverse chemotypes. Apothecia are lecideine: round, black to dark brown discs with a persistent proper margin, typically 0.2–0.8 mm across. The hymenium often bears greenish pigments, and the asci contain eight colourless, ellipsoid spores measuring 9–12 μm by 4–6 μm. Secondary chemistry is variable: individual thalli may contain xanthones, depsidones or other lichen products, a feature that first alerted chemists to its atypical status.

Microscopically the species shows the paraplectenchymatous exciple and amyloid ascal apparatus typical of Lecanoraceae, yet its combination of slightly thickened paraphyses, persistent carbonised margin and complex chemistry sets it apart from outwardly similar genera. The photobiont is a unicellular green alga of the genus Trebouxia, producing a cortex-free (ecorticate) thallus that adheres closely to the substrate.

== Habitat and distribution ==
Xanthosyne is most frequent in the humid, temperate forests of eastern North America, where it is among the commonest crustose lichens on smooth bark of Acer, Fraxinus and Liquidambar species. Populations extend south-westward into the interior United States and along the Atlantic seaboard, while disjunct occurrences reach coastal California and montane sites in southern Europe, demonstrating a broad ecological amplitude. Within its core range it can carpet entire twigs and trunk bases, tolerating periodic flooding and moderate air pollution.

The lichen prefers shaded to semi-shaded conditions and moderate moisture, thriving in riparian corridors and old-growth hardwood stands but declining on exposed, sun-bleached bark.

== Species ==
- Xanthosyne granularis R.C.Harris (2024)
- Xanthosyne sharnoffiorum Brodo, R.C.Harris, Lendemer & McMullin (2024)
- Xanthosyne varians (Ach.) R.C.Harris, Lendemer, Brodo & McMullin (2024)
