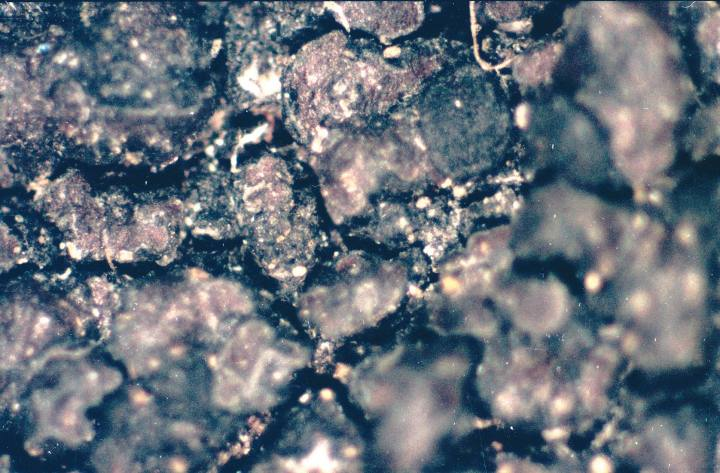

Scientific classification
- Kingdom: Fungi
- Division: Ascomycota
- Class: Lecanoromycetes
- Order: Lecanorales
- Family: Lecanoraceae
- Genus: Miriquidica
- Species: M. deusta

Binomial name
- Miriquidica deusta (Stenh.) Hertel & Rambold

Synonyms
- Lecanora deusta (Stenh.); Lecidea deusta (Stenh.) Nyl. Lecidea deustata Zahlbr. Lecidea fuscoatra var. deusta Stenh. Semilecanora deusta (Stenh.) Motyka; Miriquidica garovaglii (Schaerer); Miriquidica complanata

= Miriquidica deusta =

Species of fungus

Miriquidica deusta is a species of lichen in the family Lecanoraceae. A North American native, it generally grows on siliceous rocks. It belongs to the subdivision Pezizomycotina of the division Ascomycota, within the order Lecanorales. These are found in both general and Estonian herbariums.

== Gallery ==
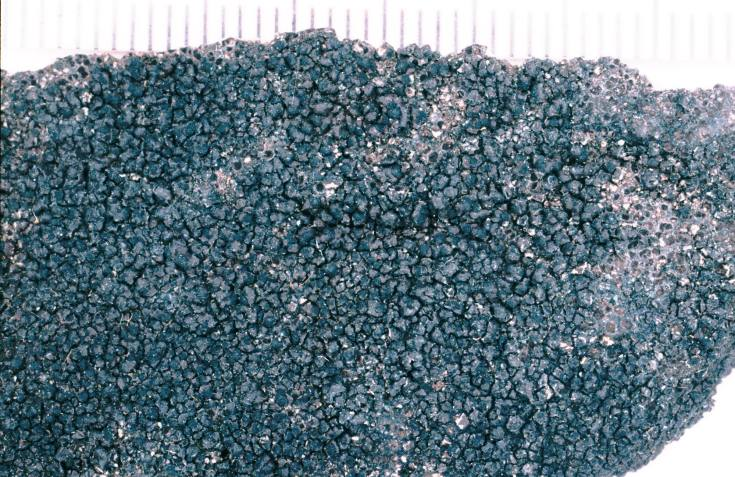
Some of the fungi from a closer view.

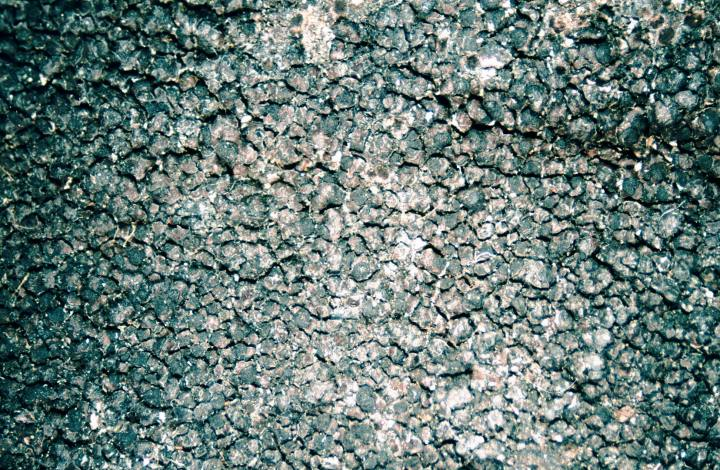
Another view of M. Deusta.

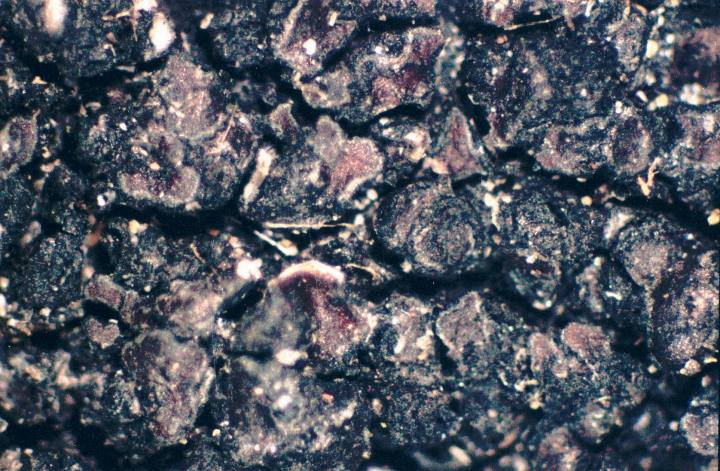
The rocks on which the fungi has grown.
