= Huea =

Scientific classification
- Kingdom: Fungi
- Division: Ascomycota
- Class: Lecanoromycetes
- Order: Lecanorales
- Family: Lecanoraceae
- Genus: Huea; C.W.Dodge & G.E.Baker (1938)

Type species
- Huea flava C.W.Dodge & G.E.Baker (1938)

Genus of lichen-forming fungi

Huea was a genus of lichen-forming fungi in the family Lecanoraceae. Huea is a now a rejected generic name for Antarctic crustose lichens, originally introduced in 1938 but later shown to have the same type species as the established genus Carbonea, leading to its formal rejection under the botanical code.

== Taxonomy ==
The genus Huea was introduced in 1938 by Carroll William Dodge and Gladys Elizabeth Baker for three species of crustose lichens from Antarctica, with Huea flava designated as the type species. In the decades that followed, several dozen additional species were transferred into the genus, although most of these are now thought to belong in other, better-defined genera. Re-examination of the original type material of H. flava showed that the type thallus is fertile and can be matched with Lecidea capsulata, a species now placed in the genus Carbonea and treated as a synonym of Carbonea vorticosa. This means that Huea is, in fact, an older name for Carbonea, a well-established genus that currently contains around 30 species.

To avoid disrupting the prevailing use of Carbonea and at the same time keep a name for the small, apparently natural group of Antarctic species traditionally called Huea, Fryday and co-authors proposed to conserve Huea with a different type species, H. cerussata. During consideration of this proposal, committee members instead favoured a cleaner solution: to reject the name Huea outright and, if necessary, introduce a new generic name for the Antarctic group. They argued that the original circumscription of Huea does not correspond to any clearly delimited modern genus, and that reusing the name in a new sense would perpetuate confusion. The proposal to conserve Huea with a new type was not supported, whereas an alternative proposal to reject the name Huea was accepted by the Nomenclature Committee for Fungi, which recommended that Huea (typified by H. flava) be treated as a rejected name under the botanical code.

The genus name honours Father Auguste-Marie Hue (1840–1917), a French lichenologist and clergyman.

== Species ==
- Huea albidocaerulescens (Müll. Arg.) C.W.Dodge (1971)
- Huea albidofusca (Nyl.) C.W.Dodge (1971)
- Huea aspicilioidea (Zahlbr.) C.W.Dodge (1971)
- Huea austroshetlandica (Zahlbr.) C.W.Dodge (1973)
- Huea cerussata (Hue) C.W.Dodge & G.E.Baker (1938)
- Huea comorensis (Zahlbr.) C.W.Dodge (1971)
- Huea confluens (Müll. Arg.) C.W.Dodge (1971)
- Huea coralligera (Hue) C.W.Dodge & G.E.Baker (1938)
- Huea cretacea (Müll.Arg.) C.W.Dodge (1971)
- Huea diphyella (Nyl.) C.W.Dodge (1948)
- Huea flava C.W.Dodge & G.E.Baker (1938)
- Huea grisea (Vain.) I.M.Lamb (1968)
- Huea imponens (Stizenb.) C.W.Dodge (1971)
- Huea lactescens (Leight.) C.W.Dodge (1971)
- Huea leptospora (Zahlbr.) C.W.Dodge (1971)
- Huea maurula (Müll.Arg.) C.W.Dodge (1971)
- Huea obliquans (Nyl.) C.W.Dodge (1971)
- Huea polioterodes (J.Steiner) C.W.Dodge (1971)
- Huea punicae (Vain.) C.W.Dodge (1971)
- Huea sedutrix (Stizenb.) C.W.Dodge (1971)
- Huea smaragdula C.W.Dodge (1948)
- Huea sorediata Øvstedal (2001)
- Huea stuhlmannii (Müll.Arg.) C.W.Dodge (1971)
- Huea suspicax (Stizenb.) C.W.Dodge (1971)
- Huea variabilis (Müll.Arg.) C.W.Dodge (1971)
