= Bryodina =

Scientific classification
- Kingdom: Fungi
- Division: Ascomycota
- Class: Lecanoromycetes
- Order: Lecanorales
- Family: Lecanoraceae
- Genus: Bryodina; Hafellner (2001)

Type species
- Bryodina rhypariza (Nyl.) Hafellner (2001)

Species
- B. rhypariza B. selenospora

Synonyms
- Bryonora sect. Rhyparizae Poelt & Obermayer (1991)

Genus of lichen-forming fungi

Bryodina is a genus of two species of crustose lichens in the family Lecanoraceae. It was first proposed as a distinct genus by Austrian lichenologist Josef Hafellner in the early 1990s, but the name was validly published only in 2001 when Hafellner supplied a formal Latin diagnosis and typification. It is distinguished from the morphologically similar genus Bryonora by the clearly separated hypothecium and excipulum, and by the thin-walled ascospores.

== Taxonomy ==
Josef Hafellner first informally separated the moss-dwelling "Rhyparizae" species from Bryonora in the early 1990s, coining the name Bryodina, but the genus became nomenclaturally valid only in 2001 when he published a full Latin diagnosis and typified it with Bryodina rhypariza. The genus sits in the family Lecanoraceae (order Lecanorales) and is typified by Bryodina rhypariza (originally described as Lecanora rhypariza by William Nylander in 1860). A second member is the Himalayan species B. selenospora. Hafellner highlighted several anatomical distinctions from Bryonora in the strict sense: the apothecial margin is grey-brown and resembles that of some Rinodina species, the cortex around the apothecium carries coarse granules, and a cup-shaped layer of intricately woven hyphae separates the hymenial tissue from the thalline exciple. Bryodina spores are thin-walled, kidney- to sausage-shaped and usually curved, whereas those of Bryonora are thicker and more barrel-like. The generic name combines the Greek bryon ('moss')—reflecting its substrate preference—with the ending "-dina", chosen to evoke its superficial resemblance to Rinodina.

== Description ==
The lichen forms a thin, crustose thallus that spreads over siliceous rock or the cushions of moss that colonise such stone. Apothecia are lecanorine: the disc and margin are differently coloured, the latter retaining a thin rim of thallus tissue (the thalline margin). Discs range from pale to mid-brown and sit flush with, or only slightly above, the surrounding crust. Beneath the hymenium lies a distinctive "intricata" layer—an intricate tangle of hyphae that behaves like a tiny cup, isolating the fertile tissue from the thalline margin. The exciple itself displays coarse granules that are visible in thin sections.

Asci follow the Lecanora-type blueprint: eight ascospores, a strongly iodine-positive (eu-amyloid) tholus, and a broad central mass that also stains blue in iodine. Spores are initially single-celled but may develop one septum with age; they are oblong, gently kidney-shaped or stoutly bacilliform, and have thin, parallel walls—features that help separate the genus from lookalikes. No specialised asexual propagules have been reported in Bryodina, and secondary metabolite data are lacking.

== Habitat and distribution ==
Bryodina species colonise siliceous substrates in cool, rather open situations where mosses form persistent mats. The type species is widespread, though scattered, on nutrient-poor sandstone and granite outcrops in temperate parts of Europe, while B. selenospora occupies comparable habitats on Himalayan boulders. Both appear to rely on the micro-climatic buffering provided by the moss layer, and neither has yet been confirmed from calcareous or heavily shaded sites.
