= Lecanora sorediomarginata =

Scientific classification
- Kingdom: Fungi
- Division: Ascomycota
- Class: Lecanoromycetes
- Order: Lecanorales
- Family: Lecanoraceae
- Genus: Lecanora
- Species: L. sorediomarginata

Binomial name
- Lecanora sorediomarginata S.A.Rodrigues, A.Terrón & Elix (2011)

Species of lichen-forming fungus

Lecanora sorediomarginata is a species of corticolous (bark-dwelling) crustose lichen in the family Lecanoraceae. It forms a whitish-grey to greenish crust on pine bark, and reproduces mainly by powdery granules (soredia) that develop along the edges of the thallus and around the fruiting bodies. The species is recognised by a distinctive red reaction when tested with household bleach. It is known only from coastal pine forests in Portugal, where it grows on maritime and stone pines.

== Taxonomy ==
Lecanora sorediomarginata was described as a new species in 2011 from coastal Portugal by Sandrina Rodrigues, Arsenio Terrón-Alfonso and John Elix, based on collections from pine woods on sand dunes. The type was collected at Dunas de Quiaios (Figueira da Foz), where it grew on Pinus pinaster bark in a coastal pine forest. A later review of European corticolous sorediate Lecanora species included L. sorediomarginata in an nrITS-based comparison (using published Portuguese sequences) and reiterated the diagnostic combination of a very thin thallus, coalescent soralia and a C+ (red) reaction.

The species epithet sorediomarginata refers to one of the features used to recognize the species: as the fruiting bodies mature, their margins become completely sorediate (covered with powdery reproductive granules). The authors reported that its broader placement within Lecanora was uncertain using the data available, but an internal transcribed spacer rDNA analysis grouped it strongly with the chemically similar epiphytic species Lecanora lividocinerea; its relationship to the better-known species groups within the genus was not well resolved.

== Description ==
The lichen forms a crustose thallus on bark that is whitish-grey to greenish. It may appear as scattered patches among the fissured bark plates of pine, or develop into a more continuous crust up to about 8 cm across. Along the edge of the thallus, small warts develop and rupture to form soralia (patches that produce soredia, the powdery propagules used for vegetative reproduction). Early soralia are often separate, but they become denser and may merge in older parts of the thallus, giving a granular, sometimes cracked surface. The photobiont (photosynthetic partner) is a green alga of the genus Trebouxia. The soredia are about 16–40 μm in diameter and may be aggregated into agglutinated clumps (consoredia) measuring about 22–140 × 35–150 μm.

Apothecia (disc-like fruiting bodies) are uncommon. When present they are sessile (resting on the thallus surface), roughly 0.37–1.25 mm in diameter, with pale to dark brown discs and a flexuose thalline margin that becomes sorediate. Spores are hyaline and ellipsoid, usually simple but sometimes with a single septum, measuring about 4.0–8.5 × 6.5–11.5 μm. In standard lichen spot tests, the soralia are C+ (red) and KC+ (red), and are P−, and K− or sometimes weakly yellow. Chemically, the thallus contains 3,5-dichloro-2'-O-methylnorstenosporic acid as the major compound, with several related chlorinated depsides in smaller amounts; atranorin and chloroatranorin occur as minor constituents and usnic acid is present only in trace amounts. In a European identification key for sorediate, bark-dwelling Lecanora species, L. sorediomarginata is separated by its C+ (red) soralia together with its association with coastal pines.

=== Similar species ===
Lecanora sorediomarginata can be confused with the similar sorediate species Lecanora orlovii, but it differs in having an endosubstratal to very thin thallus, soredia produced from ruptured marginal warts, and apothecia whose margins become completely sorediate at maturity; it also forms consoredia.

== Habitat and distribution ==
This species is epiphytic on pine, recorded from the bark of trunks and branches of Pinus pinaster and P. pinea. It occurs mainly in coastal pine forests on sand dunes, but it has also been collected in nearby coastal mountains where pines grow in woodland settings.

As described, Lecanora sorediomarginata is known only from Portugal. It has been found along the west coast (south of Esposende) and on the south-eastern coast, occurring from sites very near the sea to localities farther inland (reported up to about 22 km from the coast). Surveys at a few northern coastal sites did not locate the lichen, although the authors noted that its presence farther north cannot be ruled out.

== See also ==
- List of Lecanora species
