= Pier Luigi Nimis =

Italian botanist and lichenologist

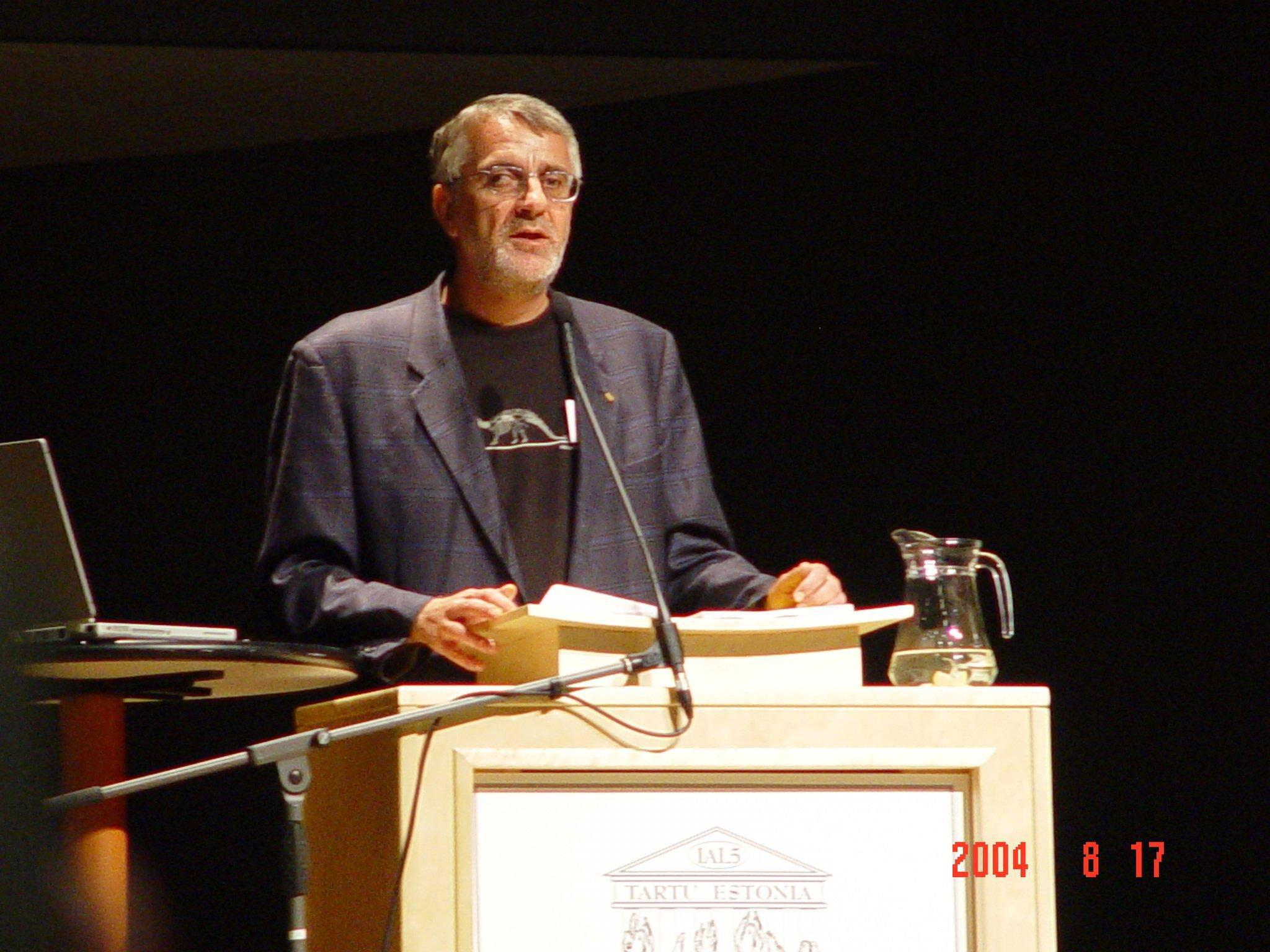
- Nimis in August 2004
- Born: 1953 (age 72–73)
- Education: University of Trieste
- Awards: Acharius Medal
- Scientific career
- Workplaces: University of Trieste
- Author abbrev. (botany): Nimis

Pier Luigi Nimis is a senior professor of botany (retired in 2023) at the University of Trieste in Italy. He specialises in lichenology and phytogeography, including the uses of lichens as indicators of pollution and devising methods for web-based identification keys.

== Early life and education ==
Pier Luigi Nimis was the first of two boys, growing up in the small town of Tarcento in Friuli (NE Italy). His father, Carlo, was an Alpine soldier who survived the Russian expedition of World War II, returned on foot, and became a prosperous baker; his mother, Matilde, was a popular teacher who taught whole generations of young people. Fascinated from a young age by insects, the young Nimis built a remarkable collection of more than 10,000 specimens from the surroundings of his home area, which, however, was swept away by the 1976 Friuli earthquake. Nimis studied at the Liceo Classico Jacopo Stellini in Udine, after which he went to the University of Trieste, where he worked on a thesis on the thorny-cushions vegetation of the high Mediterranean mountains under the mentorship of Sandro Pignatti. Post-doctoral research at the University of Western Ontario (Canada), devoted to the vegetation of the Alaska Highway, tutored by László Orlóci, let him discover the world of lichens, whose study he later pursued with his Master and friend Josef Poelt.

== Career ==
After his doctorate, Nimis became a member of staff at the University of Trieste and by 1986 he was Professor of Systematic Botany. He has since also held several administrative posts such as the chair of the School of Biological Sciences from 1988 to 1994, Director of the Department of Biology from 1996 to 2001, and Dean of the Doctoral School of Biomonitoring from 2009 until 2011.

Nimis's research was initially on phytogeography and methods for the joint mapping of plant distribution ranges with multivariate methods, mainly in the Boreal and Arctic zones. The approach developed by Nimis was inspired by the "Method of the Equiformal Progressive Areas" by Eric Hultén, i.e. the joint mapping of species with similar distribution patterns, differing in the introduction of multivariate statistics in the classification of both vegetation data and the distribution ranges of species by multivariate analysis.

Later he began to concentrate on lichens, including their identification and role as indicators of atmospheric pollution. After the nuclear accident at Chernobyl in 1986 he led programmes to map and monitor levels of radioactive caesium in macrofungi, forest plants and mosses in Italy. He extended his research to the use of lichens to monitor air pollution, proposing guidelines for their use as bioindicators and bioaccumulators, and demonstrating a correlation between lung cancer and air pollution by mapping human mortality and lichen biodiversity in the Veneto region of Italy. Nimis was also the co-leader of a NATO Advanced Research Workshop in Wales in 2000 that brought together an international group of researchers working on lichens and air pollution and led to the publication of Monitoring with Lichens – Monitoring Lichens in 2002. He also published several papers on lichens as agents of biodeterioration processes on stone, suggesting best-practices to deal with lichen growth on monuments.

In 1993, Nimis published a comprehensive catalogue of 2145 infrageneric taxa of Italian lichens. In 2016, he updated his work with 23 years of taxonomic, ecological, and molecular phylogenetic work to produce a notably thorough flora that is a critical reference for the area.

Nimis's research has also included collaborations on checklists of the lichen biodiversity of the Alps, the Mediterranean and Antarctic regions, as well as development since the 1990s of web-based identification keys that have been applied to several groups of organisms and developed into the KeyToNature mobile apps from 2015. Presently, Nimis is working on a computer-aided key to all lichens hitherto known from Italy and neighbouring countries, whose publication in paper-form is foreseen for 2027. The keys are being published online in the site of ITALIC, the information system on Italian lichens.

== Honours and awards ==
From 1987 until 1993 Nimis was president of the Italian Lichen Society, as well as one of its founders; editor-in-chief of the International Lichenological Newsletter (1997-2000), he was president of the International Association for Lichenology from 2000 until 2004. He was awarded the OPTIMA Silver Medal for the best book on the phytotaxonomy of the Mediterranean area published in the preceding three years (Sevilla, 1993), the International Ferrari-Soave Prize for Biology from the Academy of Sciences of Turin (2009), and the Acharius Medal for lifelong achievement in Lichenology (Bangkok, 2014).

== Eponymy ==
Three genera and eight species have been named to honour Nimis: Nimisia Kärnefelt & A. Thell (1993), Nimisiostella Calat., Barreno & O.E. Erikss. (1997), Nimisora Pérez-Ort., M. Svenss. & J. C. Zamora (2023); Rinodina nimisii Giralt & H. Mayrhofer (1995), Topelia nimisiana Tretiach & Vězda (1992), Sphaerellothecium nimisii Brackel & Puntillo (2023)., Sarcogyne nimisii K.Knudsen, Kocourk. & Hodková (2023), Circinaria nimisii Sohrabi, H. Mayrhofer, Obermayer & S.D. Leav. (2023), Coenogonium nimisii Malíček & Sanderson (2023), Tremella nimisiana Freire-Rallo, Diederich, Millanes & Wedin (2023), and Xanthoparmelia nimisii Barcenas-Peña, Lumbsch & Grewe (2023)

== Publications ==
Nimis is the author or co-author of several books and over 300 scientific publications.

The books include:

- Pier Luigi Nimis, Theodor J. Crovello (editors) (1991) Quantitative Approaches to Phytogeography. Kluwer Academic Publishers, Dordrecht, 280 pp. ISBN 978-94010-7426-1
- Pier Luigi Nimis, Daniela Pinna, Ornella Salvadori (1992) Licheni e conservazione dei monumenti. CLUEB, Bologna, 166 pp.
- Pier Luigi Nimis (1993) The Lichens of Italy: An Annotated Catalogue Museo Regionale di Scienze Naturali Torino, Monograph 12. 897 pp ISBN 978-88-86041-02-7
- Pier Luigi Nimis, Christoph Scheidegger, Patricia A. Wolseley (editors) (2002) doi:10.1007/978-94-010-0423-7_1 Monitoring with Lichens - Monitoring Lichens NATO Science Series: IV: (NAIV, volume 7) Springer Dordrecht/Kluwer Academic Publishers. 408 pp ISBN 978-1-4020-0429-2
- Pier Luigi Nimis, Stefano Martellos (2004) Keys to the lichens of Italy. Terricolous species. Ed. Goliardiche, Trieste, 342 pp. ISBN 88-88171-73-8
- Pier Luigi Nimis (2016) The Lichens of Italy: A Second Annotated Catalogue Edizioni Università di Trieste, 740 pp ISBN 978-88-8303-754-2

His scientific publications include:

- Nimis P.L. & Poelt J. (1987) The lichens and lichenicolous fungi of Sardinia (Italy). Studia Geobotanica 7 1–269.
- Nimis P.L. (1996) Radiocesium in plants of forest ecosystems. Studia Geobotanica 15 3–49.
- Cislaghi C. & Nimis P.L. (1997) Lichens, air pollution and lung cancer. Nature 387 463–464.
- Nimis P.L. (1998) A critical appraisal of modern generic concepts in lichenology. The Lichenologist 30 427–438.
- Nimis P.L. (2001) A tale from Bioutopia. Nature 413 21.
- Nimis P.L., Hafellner J., Roux C., Clerc P., Mayrhofer H., Martellos S., Bilovitz P.O. (2018) The Lichens of the Alps. An Annotated Catalogue. Mycokeys 31 1–634.

== See also ==
- Category:Taxa named by Pier Luigi Nimis
