= Ameliella =

Scientific classification
- Domain: Eukaryota
- Kingdom: Fungi
- Division: Ascomycota
- Class: Lecanoromycetes
- Order: Lecanorales
- Family: Lecanoraceae
- Genus: Ameliella; Fryday & Coppins (2008)

Type species
- Ameliella andreaeicola Fryday & Coppins (2008)

Species
- Ameliella andreaeicola Ameliella grisea

Genus of fungi

Ameliella is a genus of lichenized fungi in the family Lecanoraceae. Described in 2008, the genus contains two species, A. andreaeicola and A. grisea, that were collected from high elevations in the Scottish Highlands. The two species have also been found in single instances in British Columbia and Northern Norway. The generic name is derived from the Greek ameleo, meaning "neglected" or "overlooked"; it was originally intended to be Amelia, which is also the first name of the daughter of one of the authors, but this name had previously been used for another genus and was therefore ineligible for use according to the rules of mycological nomenclature. Ameliella appears to have some similarity with the lichen genus Miriquidica.

The genus name of Ameliella is in honour of Amelia Rogocka Fryday (b.1993).

The genus was circumscribed by Alan M. Fryday and Brian John Coppins in Lichenologist Vol.40 on page 388 in 2008.

== Description ==
In the genus Ameliella, the lichen thalli are small, grey-brown in color, and covered with warts or projections that resemble warts. The thalli form patches that are typically 1 to 2 centimetres (0.4 to 0.8 in) in diameter. There are usually copious apothecia (sexual reproductive structures) that cover much of the thallus.

The spores are translucent (hyaline), ranging in shape from narrowly ellipsoid to spindle-shaped to oblong to ellipsoid. The spore dimensions are 10–24 by 5–7 μm; the surface structure is simple, without a thick outer coat (epispore), or ornamentation.

== Distribution ==
Based on the collection sites of the two known species, Ameliella is restricted to locations near oceans. Other than the Scottish Highlands, A. andreaeicola is known only from single collections in British Columbia and Norway, while A. grisea has only been collected once in Norway. The Norway collection location (Skibotn area in eastern Troms County, central Northern Norway) is known for a rich lichen species diversity, considered unusual for such northern latitudes (68–69°N).
