= Sedelnikovaea =

Scientific classification
- Kingdom: Fungi
- Division: Ascomycota
- Class: Lecanoromycetes
- Order: Lecanorales
- Family: Lecanoraceae
- Genus: Sedelnikovaea; S.Y.Kondr., M.H.Jeong & Hur (2015)

Type species
- Sedelnikovaea baicalensis (Zahlbr.) S.Y.Kondr., M.H.Jeong & Hur (2015)

Species
- S. baicalensis S. marginalis S. pseudogyrophorica S. subdiscrepans

Genus of fungi

Sedelnikovaea is a genus of placodioid lichens in the family Lecanoraceae. The genus was circumscribed in 2015 by Sergey Kondratyuk, Min-Hye Jeong, and Jae-Seoun Hur to contain Sedelnikovaea baicalensis, the type species. Three additional species were transferred into the genus in 2019.

Sedelnikovaea resembles Protoparmeliopsis, and has a thallus that is placodioid (crustose at the centre and lobed at the periphery), and rosette-like. It has, however, a unique different ascus structure, and it is genetically distinct from Protoparmeliopsis. The genus name honours Russian lichenologist Nellia Vasiljevna Sedelnikova, "in recognition of her contribution to our knowledge of Asian lichen flora".

== Species ==
- Sedelnikovaea baicalensis (Zahlbr.) S.Y.Kondr., M.H.Jeong & Hur (2015)
- Sedelnikovaea marginalis (Hasse) S.Y.Kondr., L.Lőkös & Farkas (2019)
- Sedelnikovaea pseudogyrophorica (S.Y.Kondratyuk, S.-O.Oh & J.-S.Hur) S.Y. Kondr. & J.-S.Hur (2019)
- Sedelnikovaea subdiscrepans (Nyl.) S.Y.Kondr., L.Lőkös & Farkas (2019)
