= Punctonora =

Scientific classification
- Domain: Eukaryota
- Kingdom: Fungi
- Division: Ascomycota
- Class: Lecanoromycetes
- Order: Lecanorales
- Family: Lecanoraceae
- Genus: Punctonora; Aptroot (1997)

Type species
- Punctonora nigropulvinata Aptroot (1997)

Species
- P. brunneosorediata P. nigropulvinata

Genus of lichens

Punctonora is a genus of lichen-forming fungi in the family Lecanoraceae. The genus was circumscribed in 1997 by lichenologist André Aptroot, with Punctonora nigropulvinata assigned as the type species. A second species was added to the genus in 2018.
