= Parmelia meiophora =

Scientific classification
- Kingdom: Fungi
- Division: Ascomycota
- Class: Lecanoromycetes
- Order: Lecanorales
- Family: Parmeliaceae
- Genus: Parmelia
- Species: P. meiophora

Binomial name
- Parmelia meiophora Nyl. (1889)

Synonyms
- Parmelia meiophora var. isidiata J.D.Zhao (1964)

Species of lichen-forming fungus

Parmelia meiophora is a species of corticolous (bark-dwelling) foliose lichen in the family Parmeliaceae. Described from collections made in Yunnan, China in 1889, this lichen is known from high-elevation cloud forests in southwestern China, where it grows on tree bark at elevations of roughly 3,000–4,000 metres; it has also been recorded from Nepal. The species forms loosely attached, greenish-grey rosette-shaped growths 8–15 cm across, characterized by a shiny surface covered with numerous tiny projections (isidia) and very small pale pores. It is distinguished by its strongly branched root-like structures on the black undersurface and its chemistry, which produces distinctive colour reactions when tested with potassium hydroxide solution: the cortex turns weakly yellow while the interior changes from yellow to red.

== Taxonomy ==
Parmelia meiophora was introduced as a new species by William Nylander in Auguste-Marie Hue's 1889 work "Lichenes yunnanenses", based on bark-dwelling material from montane forests in Yunnan, China. The protologue cites collections made on 6 and 17 June 1887 above Dapingzi (near Songping village) and Mosoying (Lankong) at about 3,000 m elevation. Nylander associated the species with the P. perlata group and recorded its reactions: potassium hydroxide solution (the K test) tinges the cortex weakly yellow and quickly turns the medulla from yellow to red; the hymenial iodine reaction is blue, later violet. He described brown apothecia that are cup-shaped when young then flatten (6–10 mm across) and noted eight ellipsoid to roughly spherical (globose) spores per ascus. A variety proposed by Ji-Ding Zhao in 1964, Parmelia meiophora var. isidiata, is considered synonymous with the nominate variety.

== Description ==
Parmelia meiophora forms a loosely attached, firm foliose thallus on bark, coloured greenish mineral grey (often browning in the herbarium) and 8–15 cm across. Lobes are somewhat irregular, closely contiguous to overlapping, 3–5 mm wide. The upper surface is shiny and flat, becoming finely cracked with age, and carries numerous very small pale pores (pseudocyphellae) 0.2–0.3 mm long. The thallus is distinctly isidiate: the isidia are short, wart-like (bullate), about 0.1 mm thick and 0.1–0.2 mm tall, unbranched, and their tips often darken. The underside is black and densely rhizinate; the rhizines are plentiful and strongly squarrosely branched (spreading at right angles), 1–2 mm long.

Fruiting bodies are rare. Apothecia, when present, are adnate and 3–5 mm in diameter; the hymenium is 55–60 micrometres (μm) tall and ascospores measure 5–6 × 7–8 μm with an epispore about 1 μm thick. Pycnidia have not been seen. Chemically, the species contains atranorin, salazinic acid, and consalazinic acid.

== Habitat and distribution ==
Parmelia meiophora is known from south-western China, with confirmed collections from Yunnan. It grows on tree bark in mountainous cloud forests, especially where conifers and Rhododendron dominate. The species appears to be a high-elevation lichen, occurring at roughly 3,000–4,000 m. In Nepal, P. meiophora has been reported from 1,800 to 3,350 m elevation in a compilation of published records.
