= Psorinia =

Scientific classification
- Domain: Eukaryota
- Kingdom: Fungi
- Division: Ascomycota
- Class: Lecanoromycetes
- Order: Lecanorales
- Family: Lecanoraceae
- Genus: Psorinia; Gotth. Schneid.

Type species
- Psorinia conglomerata (Ach.) Gotth. Schneid.

Genus of fungi

Psorinia is a genus of fungi in the family Lecanoraceae.
