= Adelolecia =

Scientific classification
- Domain: Eukaryota
- Kingdom: Fungi
- Division: Ascomycota
- Class: Lecanoromycetes
- Order: Lecanorales
- Family: Lecanoraceae
- Genus: Adelolecia; Hertel & Hafellner (1984)

Type species
- Adelolecia pilati Hertel & Hafellner (1984)

Species
- A. kolaensis A. pilati A. rhododendrina A. sonorae

Genus of lichen

Adelolecia is a genus of crustose lichens in the family Lecanoraceae. These rock-dwelling lichens form thin crusts made up of small angular patches, typically reaching about 12 cm across with distinctive black, round fruiting bodies that sit directly on the surface. The genus includes four species found in mountainous and arctic regions, where they grow on various types of rock and are distinguished by chemical compounds (lichen products) that produce colourful diagnostic reactions when tested with laboratory solutions.

== Taxonomy ==
The genus was circumscribed by Hannes Hertel and Josef Hafellner in 1984. The genus was formerly classified in the family Ramalinaceae, but molecular phylogenetic analysis showed it to belong to the Lecanoraceae.

== Description ==
Adelolecia forms a thin crust on rock, either lying on the surface in tiny, angular islands (areoles) or growing within the upper grain of the stone itself. Colonies can reach about 12 cm across but lack a darker prothallus fringe and never produce the powdery soredia or finger-like isidia that many crustose lichens use for reproduction. The internal partner is a Trebouxia-type green alga, and the fungal medulla beneath the cortex is white and compact.

Black, round apothecia sit directly on the thallus and are slightly pinched where they meet the crust. Their discs may be shallowly cup-shaped, flat or gently domed and are edged by a prominent, long-lasting rim. Microscopy shows a dark-brown outer wall that is paler inside and made of broadly radiating hyphae; in A. pilati this wall contains yellow crystals that turn bright magenta in a drop of potassium hydroxide solution, a reaction caused by the anthraquinone compound 7-chloroemodin. The spore layer (hymenium) is colourless to bluish and stains deep blue with iodine, while the overlying gel is green to dark blue and envelopes slender paraphyses that separate in alkali. Each ascus is of the Biatora type and normally carries eight smooth, narrowly ellipsoid ascospores that remain single-celled and colourless. Asexual reproduction is rare: minute sunken pycnidia sometimes occur and release rod-shaped, colourless conidia. Chemically, some species contain atranorin or traces of xanthones in addition to the anthraquinone pigments mentioned above.

== Species ==
- Adelolecia kolaensis (Nyl.) Hertel & Rambold (1995)
- Adelolecia pilati (Hepp) Hertel & Hafellner (1984)
- Adelolecia rhododendrina (Nyl.) Printzen (2001)
- Adelolecia sonorae Hertel (2004)
