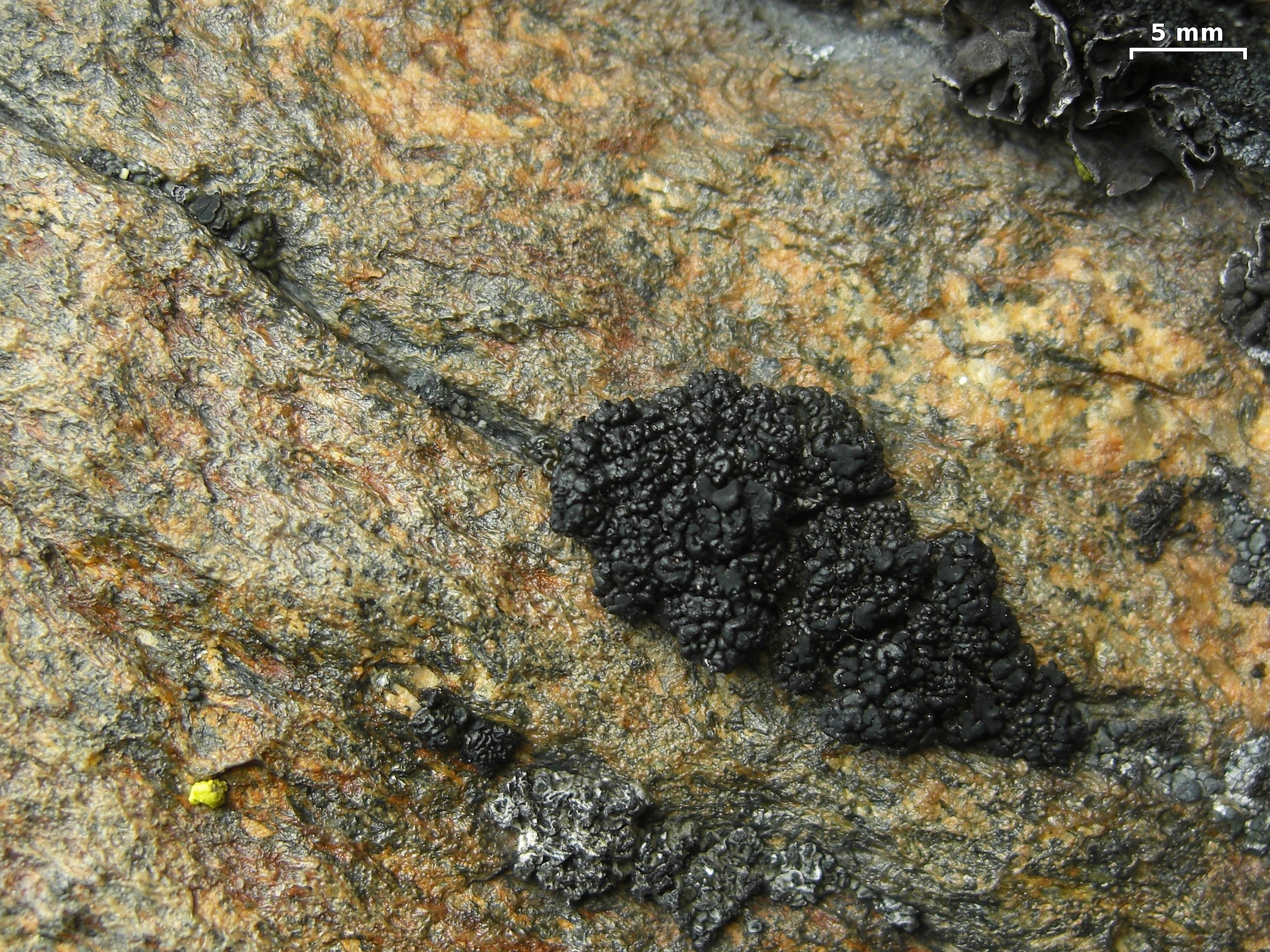
- Pulvinora pringlei in Wells Gray Provincial Park, British Columbia. Scale bar: 5 mm

Scientific classification
- Kingdom: Fungi
- Division: Ascomycota
- Class: Lecanoromycetes
- Order: Lecanorales
- Family: Lecanoraceae
- Genus: Pulvinora; Davydov, Yakovch. & Printzen (2021)

Type species
- Pulvinora stereothallina Davydov & Yakovch. (2021)

Species
- P. brandegeei P. cavicola P. pringlei P. stereothallina P. subcavicola

= Pulvinora =

Genus of lichens

Pulvinora is a genus of saxicolous (rock-dwelling) lichens in the family Lecanoraceae. The genus was established in 2021 when DNA studies showed that two species then placed in Lecanora formed a distinct evolutionary lineage. Later work broadened the genus to include three additional species formerly treated in Lecanora, bringing the total number of recognised species to five. Species of Pulvinora form small cushions or thick, warty crusts on rock, and they produce black apothecia (fruiting bodies) that start with raised rims but become strongly domed as they mature.

== Taxonomy ==
The genus Pulvinora was circumscribed in 2021 by Evgeny Davydov, Lidia Yakovchenko, and Christian Printzen after multilocus analyses showed that the North American Lecanora pringlei and a morphologically similar Altai Mountains taxon formed a well-supported lineage distinct from Lecanora in the broad sense. The authors erected the new genus Pulvinora within Lecanoraceae, designated P. stereothallina as the type species and transferred L. pringlei as P. pringlei. In that initial framework, Lecanora cavicola could not be tested with DNA sequence data, and some material identified as L. subcavicola was placed outside Pulvinora.

In 2025, Edyta Mazur and Lucyna Śliwa re-evaluated the group using DNA sequences from three loci (mtSSU, nuITS, and nuLSU). They recovered Lecanora cavicola and L. subcavicola as a strongly supported clade sister to P. pringlei and P. stereothallina, making the expanded Pulvinora clade monophyletic. On that basis, they proposed a broader circumscription of Pulvinora and made the new combinations P. cavicola and P. subcavicola. They also transferred Lecanora brandegeei to Pulvinora on morphological and chemical grounds, while noting that specimens labelled Lecanora cf. subcavicola in earlier work appear to represent a different lineage and may belong with Glaucomaria rather than Pulvinora.

== Description ==
Pulvinora species have asci similar to those found in genus Lecanora. Their apothecia are mycolecanorine, meaning they are lecanorine (and so have a thalline margin with an intact cortex), but without photobiont cells in the thalline exciple. The apothecia eventually become strongly convex with an algal layer that is pushed below the hypothecium.

With the broader circumscription of the genus, thallus form ranges from distinctly cushion-like and stalked (pseudopodetioid) to a thick crust made of warty, areolate to squamulose units that can still appear pulvinate when the units become narrowed at the base or weakly stalked. Across the expanded genus, species share similar apothecial structure (including an excluded thalline margin with an algal layer retained beneath the hypothecium) and a chemical profile in which atranorin and alectorialic acid are common major substances, with additional acids varying among species.

== Habitat and distribution ==
Species of Pulvinora grow on rock. In the expanded genus concept, P. cavicola is an alpine species on hard siliceous rocks. It was described from Norway and has been reported from multiple regions, including high-elevation sites in Bolivia. Although widespread, it has been described as rare in the field.

== Species ==
- Pulvinora brandegeei (Tuck.) Mazur & Śliwa (2025)
- Pulvinora cavicola (Creveld) Mazur & Śliwa (2025)
- Pulvinora pringlei (Tuck.) Davydov, Yakovch., Hollinger, Bungartz & Printzen (2021)
- Pulvinora stereothallina Davydov & Yakovch. (2021)
- Pulvinora subcavicola (B.D. Ryan) Mazur & Śliwa (2025)
