= Frutidella =

Scientific classification
- Kingdom: Fungi
- Division: Ascomycota
- Class: Lecanoromycetes
- Order: Lecanorales
- Family: Lecanoraceae
- Genus: Frutidella; Kalb (1994)

Type species
- Frutidella caesioatra (Schaer.) Kalb (1994)

Species
- F. caesioatra F. furfuracea F. pullata

Genus of lichen

Frutidella is a genus of lichen-forming fungi in the family Lecanoraceae. It contains three species. The genus was established in 1994 by Klaus Kalb to accommodate a species previously classified in the genus Lecidea. These lichens form thin crusts that often develop distinctive wart-like swellings packed with tiny granules, and they produce small, dome-shaped fruiting bodies with a characteristic blue-green sheen. Species of Frutidella typically grow on acidic substrates, including nutrient-poor soils in upland areas and the bark of trees.

== Taxonomy ==
The genus was circumscribed in 1994 by Klaus Kalb to contain the species formerly known as Lecidea caesioatra.

== Description ==
Frutidella grows as a thin crust (crustose thallus) that breaks into discrete, tile-like patches (areoles) or develops conspicuous wart-like swellings. These swellings are packed with tiny, grain-like outgrowths that resemble miniature isidia; as they age the grains can crumble into a powder of soredia, providing a way for the lichen to spread vegetatively. Thallus colour ranges from greenish and grey to bluish or even nearly black, and a narrow white border (prothallus) may or may not be present. The photosynthetic partner is a single-celled green alga of the chlorococcoid type.

The fruiting bodies of Frutidella are small, dome-shaped discs (biatorine apothecia). They sit directly on the thallus, sometimes half-hidden among the surface granules, and appear bluish black or dusted with a blue-grey frost (pruina) when damp. Unlike lichens that recycle thallus tissue to form a rim, these apothecia lack a thalline margin. Instead they are encircled by a true exciple—tightly packed hyphae that radiate like spokes and stay pale or yellowish, never becoming blackened. A crystalline pigment in the surface layer (epithecium) lends a bright blue-green sheen that does not react with potassium hydroxide solution. Beneath, the spore-bearing tissue (hymenium) contains slender, sparsely branched threads (paraphyses) and asci of the Lecanora type, each holding eight smooth, colourless, single-celled ascospores.

Asexual reproduction takes place in minute, flask-shaped structures (pycnidia) that have a darkened tip and release very slender, thread-like conidia. Chemical studies using thin-layer chromatography have detected the secondary metabolite compounds sphaerophorin and thiophanic acid in most specimens, with isoarthothelin or asemone present occasionally.

== Ecology ==
Species of Frutidella favour acidic substrates. In upland and montane habitats they typically form crusts on nutrient-poor, low-pH soils, where they spread across cushions of mosses. Elsewhere they are mainly corticolous, colonising the acidic bark of trees.

== Species ==
As of July 2025, Species Fungorum (in the Catalogue of Life) accepts three species of Frutidella:

- Frutidella caesioatra (Schaer.) Kalb (1994)
- Frutidella furfuracea (Anzi) M.Westb. & M.Svenss. (2017)
- Frutidella pullata (Norman) Schmull (2011)
