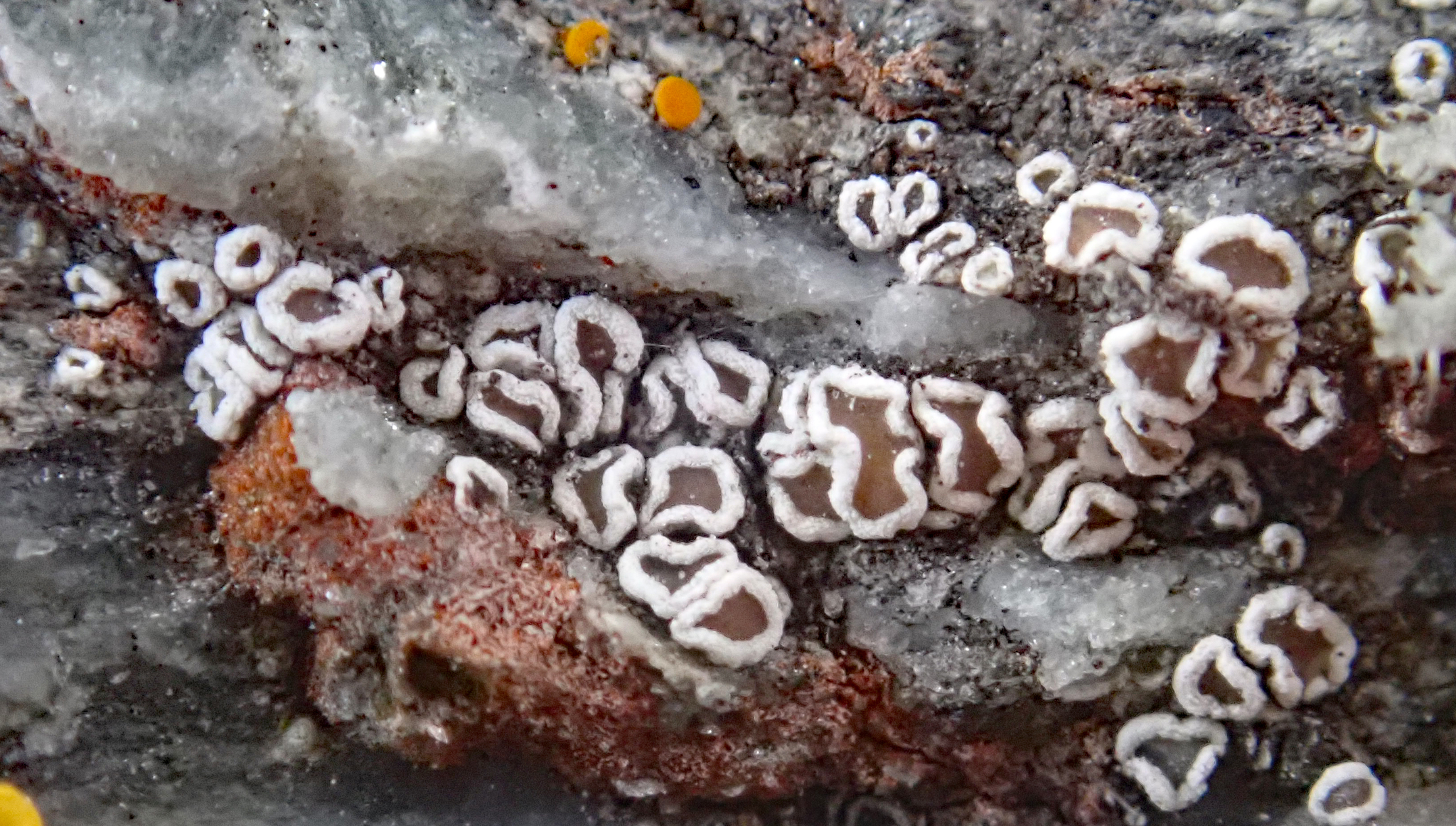
- Myriolecis dispersa

Scientific classification
- Kingdom: Fungi
- Division: Ascomycota
- Class: Lecanoromycetes
- Order: Lecanorales
- Family: Lecanoraceae
- Genus: Myriolecis; Clem. (1909)

Type species
- Myriolecis sambuci (Pers.) Clem. (1909)

Synonyms
- Arctopeltis Poelt (1983)

= Myriolecis =

Genus of lichen-forming fungi

Myriolecis is a genus of lichen-forming fungi in the family Lecanoraceae. These lichens typically form thin, crust-like patches on rocks, bark, or soil, and reproduce through small disc-shaped structures that contain spores. The genus was reinstated in recent years when DNA studies showed that these species form a distinct group separate from the closely related genus Lecanora. Phylogenetic studies place Myriolecis in the MPRPS clade of Lecanoraceae, close to Protoparmeliopsis.

== Taxonomy ==
The genus was originally circumscribed in 1909 by Frederic Clements with Myriolecis sambuci as the type species. The genus was later reinstated to accommodate the Lecanora dispersa group and Arctopeltis. Molecular phylogenetics data showed that this group of species formed a clade that is genetically distinct from Lecanora, and Myriolecis was the oldest name available to hold these species.

A seven-locus phylogeny of Lecanora sensu lato recovered Myriolecis as a strongly supported genus-level clade within the MPRPS clade of Lecanoraceae, in a close relationship to Protoparmeliopsis. The same study noted that Myriolecis contains several subclades, one of which corresponds to Polyozosia, a name that some authors have recently resurrected as an older, valid name connected to this group; the authors did not propose nomenclatural changes beyond commenting on the issue. The authors also found Lecanora utahensis to be closely related to Myriolecis in their dataset, but refrained from transferring it because its position among the subclades was unclear; unlike many Myriolecis species, it produces isousnic acid rather than xanthones.

== Description ==
Myriolecis species grow as thin, crust-like patches that are usually sunk into the surface they inhabit, whether that is rock, bark, or soil. Where the thallus (the lichen body) protrudes, it can crack into tiny island-like plates called areoles or break up into scattered granules, but it does not form the powdery eruptions known as soredia, the finger-like projections called isidia or the cyanobacterial swellings termed cephalodia. The photosynthetic partner is most often a single-celled green alga from the genus Trebouxia, although closely related algae may substitute in some species.

The sexual fruit-bodies (apothecia) sit directly on the thallus and are occasionally lifted on a very short stalk. In most species the apothecia are lecanorine, although M. persimilis has apothecia that appear more biatorine-like. Each disc starts with a conspicuous rim of thallus tissue that is white or matches the thallus colour. This margin is usually thick and persistent, often becoming conspicuously crenulate (scalloped) with age. A distinct supporting wall (true exciple) is largely absent, but the disc's surface layer (epithecium) carries brown pigments that can clump into tiny grains. Beneath this, the spore-bearing layer (hymenium) is almost colourless and stains blue when treated with iodine, confirming the Lecanora-type ascus—a slender club that typically contains eight colourless, one-celled ascospores with smooth, sometimes thickened walls. Minute, flask-shaped pycnidia embedded in the thallus produce asexual spores: tiny rods that may be straight, curved or sickle-shaped. Many species produce xanthones, and some also contain additional substances such as gyrophoric acid (for example in M. salina) or pannarin (for example in M. dispersa) as minor components; other taxa have no secondary metabolites detectable by thin-layer chromatography (for example M. sambuci).

== Species ==
- Myriolecis actophila (Wedd.) M.Bertrand & Cl.Roux (2016)
- Myriolecis agardhiana (Ach.) Śliwa, Zhao Xin & Lumbsch (2015)
- Myriolecis altunica R.Mamut & A.Abbas (2019)
- Myriolecis antiqua (J.R.Laundon) Śliwa, Zhao Xin & Lumbsch (2015)
- Myriolecis bandolensis (B.de Lesd.) M.Bertrand, Cl.Roux & Nimis (2016)
- Myriolecis behringii (Nyl.) Hafellner (2016)
- Myriolecis caesioalutacea (H.Magn.) R.Mamut (2019)
- Myriolecis carlottiana (Lewis & Śliwa) Śliwa, Zhao Xin & Lumbsch (2015)
- Myriolecis congesta (Clauzade & Vězda) M.Bertrand & Cec.Roux (2016)
- Myriolecis crenulata (Hook.) Śliwa, Zhao Xin & Lumbsch (2015)
- Myriolecis dispersa (Pers.) Śliwa, Zhao Xin & Lumbsch (2015)
- Myriolecis eurycarpa (Poelt, Leuckert & Cl.Roux) Hafellner & Türk (2016)
- Myriolecis expectans (Darb.) Śliwa, Zhao Xin & Lumbsch (2015)
- Myriolecis flowersiana (H.Magn.) Śliwa, Zhao Xin & Lumbsch (2015)
- Myriolecis fugiens (Nyl.) Śliwa, Zhao Xin & Lumbsch (2015)
- Myriolecis invadens (H.Magn.) Śliwa, Zhao Xin & Lumbsch (2015)
- Myriolecis juniperina (Śliwa) Śliwa, Zhao Xin & Lumbsch (2015)
- Myriolecis latzelii (Zahlbr.) Cl.Roux (2016)
- Myriolecis liguriensis (B.de Lesd.) Cl.Roux (2016)
- Myriolecis massei M.Bertrand & J.-Y.Monnat (2018)
- Myriolecis mons-nivis (Darb.) Śliwa, Zhao Xin & Lumbsch (2015)
- Myriolecis oyensis (M.Bertrand & Cl.Roux) M.Bertrand & Cl.Roux (2016)
- Myriolecis percrenata (H.Magn.) Śliwa, Zhao Xin & Lumbsch (2015)
- Myriolecis perpruinosa (Fröberg) Śliwa, Zhao Xin & Lumbsch (2015)
- Myriolecis persimilis (Th.Fr.) Śliwa, Zhao Xin & Lumbsch (2015)
- Myriolecis poeltiana (Clauzade & Cl.Roux) Śliwa, Zhao Xin & Lumbsch (2015)
- Myriolecis prominens (Clauzade & Vězda) Cl.Roux & Nimis (2016)
- Myriolecis prophetae-eliae (Sipman) Sipman & Cl.Roux (2016)
- Myriolecis salina (H.Magn.) Śliwa, Zhao Xin & Lumbsch (2015)
- Myriolecis schofieldii (Brodo) Śliwa, Zhao Xin & Lumbsch (2015)
- Myriolecis sverdrupiana (Øvstedal) Śliwa, Zhao Xin & Lumbsch (2015)
- Myriolecis torrida (Vain.) Śliwa, Zhao Xin & Lumbsch (2015)
- Myriolecis wetmorei (Śliwa) Śliwa, Zhao Xin & Lumbsch (2015)
- Myriolecis zosterae (Ach.) Śliwa, Zhao Xin & Lumbsch (2015)
