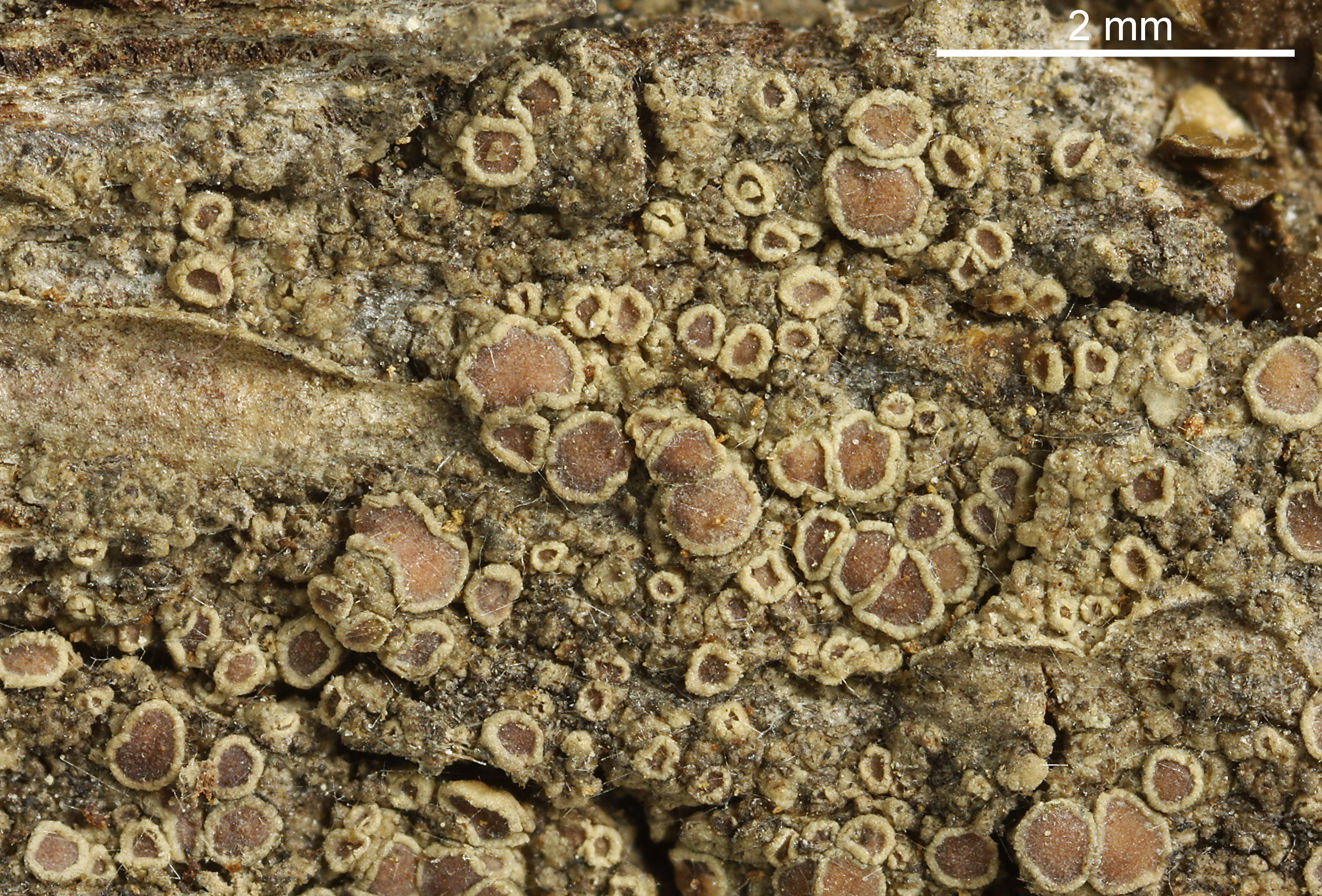
- Lecanoropsis saligna

Scientific classification
- Kingdom: Fungi
- Division: Ascomycota
- Class: Lecanoromycetes
- Order: Lecanorales
- Family: Lecanoraceae
- Genus: Lecanoropsis; M.Choisy ex Ivanovich (2025)

Type species
- Lecanoropsis saligna (Schrad.) Ivanovich & Printzen (2025)

Species
- See text

= Lecanoropsis =

Genus of lichen-forming fungi

Lecanoropsis is a genus of crustose lichens in the family Lecanoraceae. Species in this genus grow mainly on bark and wood, where the body of the lichen is often largely embedded in the substrate rather than forming a conspicuous surface crust. Chemically, they are characterised by usnic acid or the related compound isousnic acid. The genus was validated in 2025 following a molecular study that confirmed it as a distinct lineage, with six species described as new to science in the same revision.

== Taxonomy ==
The name was originally introduced by Maurice Choisy in 1949, but his generic circumscription did not designate a type species and the name is therefore treated as invalidly published. A later typification by Josef Hafellner fixed the type as Lecanoropsis saligna. A seven-locus phylogeny of Lecanora (in the loose sense) recovered Lecanoropsis as a strongly supported lineage within the MPRPS clade of Lecanoraceae.

In a 2025 revision, Ivanovich and co-authors re-examined the position of the Lecanora saligna group within Lecanora in the loose sense, a large assemblage of crustose lichens comprising around 1,000 recognised species and traditionally divided into several morphology-based groups. They focused on 23 species assigned to the L. saligna group, which are mainly corticolous (bark-dwelling) or lignicolous (wood-dwelling) and usually contain isousnic acid, usnic acid, or both as major secondary metabolites. Their study combined detailed morphological work with a molecular analysis based on seven DNA loci, including four newly developed mitochondrial primer pairs, and recovered well-supported species boundaries within the group. The authors emphasized that adding the newer mitochondrial loci improved phylogenetic resolution in this part of Lecanoraceae, and that earlier two-locus analyses had left the saligna lineage weakly supported. Compared with earlier analyses, the expanded dataset confirmed the monophyly of a "core" saligna clade; species in this clade were formally segregated into Lecanoropsis, thereby applying Choisy's generic name to a molecularly defined lineage. The revision also described six species as new to science.

A popular account from Great Basin National Park discussed Lecanora prolificans, a species described from BioBlitz material. In a seven-locus phylogeny, L. prolificans clustered outside Lecanoropsis with Lecanora mughicola and L. laxa in a separate clade between Lecanoropsis and Straminella.

The same seven-locus phylogeny recovered a separate, well-supported clade of saligna-like taxa outside Lecanoropsis, including Lecanora mughicola and L. prolificans; these species produce usnic and isousnic acid but lack macroconidia. The authors also rejected the previously suggested transfer of Rhizoplaca mcleanii to Lecanoropsis and recommended retaining it in Rhizoplaca.

== Description ==
Lecanoropsis comprises mainly bark- and wood-dwelling crustose lichens with a thallus that is often largely immersed in the substrate and only weakly developed on the surface; most species are esorediate. The apothecia are typically lecanorine in form, although in Lecanoropsis anopta mature apothecia can become more or less biatorine in appearance. The thalline margin is corticate and lacks large crystals that remain insoluble in potassium hydroxide solution (K). Conidia vary among species, and some taxa produce conspicuous macroconidia.

Chemically, species typically contain dibenzofuran derivatives such as usnic acid and isousnic acid, while atranorin and psoromic acid are absent.

== Species ==
As of November 2025, 23 species are included in Lecanoropsis by the Catalogue of Life, although some saligna-like taxa (for example Lecanora prolificans) have been recovered outside the genus in multi-locus phylogenies.

- Lecanoropsis albellula (Nyl.) Ivanovich (2025)
- Lecanoropsis anopta (Nyl.) Ivanovich & Printzen (2025)
- Lecanoropsis anoptizodes (Nyl.) Palice & Ivanovich (2025)
- Lecanoropsis austrocascadensis Hollinger & Ivanovich (2025)
- Lecanoropsis calabrica (M.Brand & van den Boom) Ivanovich & Printzen (2025)
- Lecanoropsis coniferarum (Printzen) Ivanovich & Printzen (2025)
- Lecanoropsis coppinsii (M.Brand & van den Boom) Ivanovich & Printzen (2025)
- Lecanoropsis coracina Ivanovich, Otte & Sheehy (2025)
- Lecanoropsis crassithallina (van den Boom) Ivanovich & Printzen (2025)
- Lecanoropsis iapyx Ivanovich & Hollinger (2025)
- Lecanoropsis latens (Printzen) Ivanovich & Printzen (2025)
- Lecanoropsis micans Ivanovich, Hollinger & Printzen (2025)
- Lecanoropsis omissa Palice, Ivanovich & Printzen (2025)
- Lecanoropsis pseudosarcopidoides (M.Brand & van den Boom) Ivanovich & Printzen (2025)
- Lecanoropsis prolificans Ivanovich, Hollinger & Printzen (2025)
- Lecanoropsis quercicola (Coppins & P.James) Ivanovich (2025)
- Lecanoropsis saligna (Schrad.) Ivanovich & Printzen (2025)
- Lecanoropsis sarcopidoides (A.Massal.) Ivanovich & Printzen (2025)
- Lecanoropsis subcinctula (Nyl.) Ivanovich & Printzen (2025)
- Lecanoropsis subintricata (Nyl.) Ivanovich & Printzen (2025)
- Lecanoropsis subravida (Nyl.) Ivanovich & Printzen (2025)
- Lecanoropsis subsaligna (M.Brand & van den Boom) Ivanovich & Printzen (2025)
