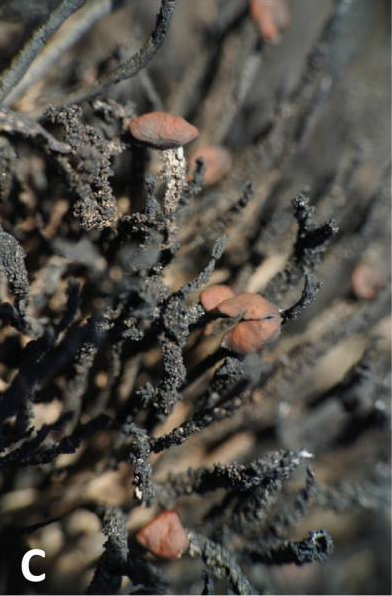
- Himantormia lugubris

Scientific classification
- Domain: Eukaryota
- Kingdom: Fungi
- Division: Ascomycota
- Class: Lecanoromycetes
- Order: Lecanorales
- Family: Parmeliaceae
- Genus: Himantormia; I.M.Lamb (1964)

Type species
- Himantormia lugubris (Hue) I.M.Lamb (1964)

Species
- H. deusta H. lugubris

Synonyms
- Nimisia Kärnefelt & A.Thell (1993)

= Himantormia =

Genus of lichen

Himantormia is a genus of lichen-forming fungi in the family Parmeliaceae. It consists of two species found in the southernmost parts of South America and Antarctica. Both species are characterised by a paraplectenchymatous cortex composed of large, dark pigmented cells, a pachydermatous medulla, and the absence of lichenin in their cell walls. While morphologically similar in some aspects, the species can be distinguished by their lobe shapes, cortex cell sizes, medulla structure, and distinct secondary metabolite compositions, with H. deusta producing fumarprotocetraric acid as its major compound and H. lugubris containing alectorialic acid as its primary metabolite.

== Taxonomy ==
Himantormia was first circumscribed by the British lichenologist Elke Mackenzie (formerly Lamb) in 1964 in the British Antarctic Survey Scientific Reports, with H. lugubris designated as the type species. The genus was initially monospecific, containing only H. lugubris, but was later expanded to include a second species when Nimisia deusta was transferred to Himantormia as H. deusta in 2007.

The genus is characterised by its Patagonian-Antarctic distribution pattern and several morphological features. Both species have a paraplectenchymatous cortex composed of large, dark pigmented cells with sizeable lumina. They also share anatomical features such as a pachydermatous medulla and the absence of lichenin in their cell walls.

Molecular phylogenetics analysis using nuclear internal transcribed spacer (ITS) ribosomal DNA sequences has confirmed the close relationship between the two species, with bootstrap analysis showing maximum statistical support for a common clade of H. deusta and H. lugubris. This relationship is further supported by their similar spore morphology, with both species producing bacilliform (rod-shaped) conidia.

== Description ==
Himantormia lichens are characterised by their distinctive growth forms and internal structure. The two species in the genus form different shapes: H. deusta produces strap-like growths up to 1 cm tall with slight channels, while H. lugubris forms larger growths up to 4 cm tall that range from awl-shaped to strap-like structures.

Like other lichens, Himantormia species have a complex internal anatomy. Their outer protective layer (cortex) is made up of specialised cells that differ in size between species – H. deusta has larger cortical cells (10–15 μm) compared to H. lugubris (4–7 μm). Below this lies the medulla, a tissue layer made of fungal threads called hyphae. In H. deusta, this layer is densely packed, while H. lugubris shows a more loose structure with some dense patches. The fungal threads themselves also vary in thickness between species, with H. deusta having slightly thicker hyphae.

Both species reproduce through small, rod-shaped asexual spores called conidia. These spores are similar in both species, though H. deusta's spores are slightly thicker in their middle section. The species also differ in where they house their symbiotic algae – in H. deusta, the algal cells are found beneath reproductive structures (pycnidia and apothecia), while in H. lugubris they occur in light-coloured patches below the cortex. The species can also be distinguished by their unique chemical compositions. H. deusta produces several secondary metabolites (lichen products) including fumarprotocetraric acid as its main compound, while H. lugubris primarily contains alectorialic acid along with other compounds in smaller amounts.

Both species reproduce mainly through apothecia (fruiting bodies), which typically form on the surface of the lichen. While these are usually found along the flat surfaces in both species, H. lugubris occasionally produces them at branch tips as well.

== Habitat and distribution ==
The two Himantormia species are found in southern South America and Antarctica. H. deusta occurs in Tierra del Fuego near Cape Horn, Chile (approximately 56°30'S, 60°W) and the Falkland Islands. It grows on granite rocks, specifically on steeply inclined faces in subalpine areas. H. lugubris has a more southerly Antarctic distribution. The type specimen was collected in Antarctica from rocks at an elevation of 120 metres at Petermann Island. The species was documented from a collection made during a 1909 expedition.

== Species ==
- Himantormia deusta (Hook.f.) A.Thell & Søchting (2007)
- Himantormia lugubris (Hue) I.M.Lamb (1964)
