= Frances Ellen Baker =

American mathematician

Frances Ellen Baker (1902–1995) was an American mathematician who became a professor of mathematics and chair of the mathematics department at Vassar College.

== Early life and education ==
Baker's father was Richard Philip Baker, a British-born mathematician, mathematical model maker, and college administrator. Her mother, Katherine Riedelbauch Baker, was a music teacher and chamber musician. Baker was born on December 19, 1902, in Anna, Illinois, and was home-schooled until high school, where she attended a public school in Iowa City, Iowa. She became valedictorian of her school, graduating in 1919.

At the University of Iowa, where her father had become a mathematics professor, she studied classics and mathematics, graduating magna cum laude and Phi Beta Kappa in 1923. She continued on as a graduate student, working with her father in mathematics and completing a master's degree in 1925.

After completing her master's degree, Baker became head of the mathematics and physics department at Tabor College in Iowa in 1925, but the college closed in 1927. After briefly teaching at Jefferson City Junior College in Missouri, she earned a teaching certificate from the University of Iowa in 1928, and took courses at the University of Chicago beginning in 1929. She entered the university as a full-time student in 1931, and completed her Ph.D. in 1934. Her dissertation, A Contribution to the Waring Problem for Cubic Functions, concerned a variation of Waring's problem in number theory, on representing integers as sums of the values of a cubic polynomial; it was supervised by Leonard Eugene Dickson. Both Dickson and Richard Baker, in turn, had been students of the same doctoral advisor, E. H. Moore.

== Later life and career ==
Baker's career at Vassar College began in early 1935, when she took a position as instructor there. In late 1935 she moved to Mount Holyoke College as an assistant professor.

In 1942, Baker returned to Vassar, where her sister, mycologist Gladys Elizabeth Baker, had joined the faculty in 1940. Baker was re-hired at Vassar as an associate professor of mathematics; she was promoted to full professor in 1951, and chaired the mathematics department for two terms, from 1948 to 1950 and 1951 to 1952. She retired as a professor emerita in 1968. In her work as a mathematics professor, she was "particularly involved with honor students", both individually and as faculty mentor of student honor societies. She also gave public lectures about her father's models.

In her retirement, Baker rejoined her sister in Sun City, Arizona. She died on April 4, 1995, in Peoria, Arizona.

== Legacy ==
A doctoral hood worn by Baker is in the collection of the National Museum of American History, with photographs of Baker.
