= Myrionora =

Scientific classification
- Kingdom: Fungi
- Division: Ascomycota
- Class: Lecanoromycetes
- Order: Lecanorales
- Family: Lecanoraceae
- Genus: Myrionora; R.C.Harris

Type species
- Myrionora albidula (Willey) R.C. Harris

Genus of fungi

Myrionora is a genus of fungi in the family Lecanoraceae.
