= Sagema =

Scientific classification
- Kingdom: Fungi
- Division: Ascomycota
- Class: Lecanoromycetes
- Order: Lecanorales
- Family: Lecanoraceae
- Genus: Sagema; Poelt & Grube (1993)
- Species: S. potentillae

Binomial name
- Sagema potentillae Poelt & Grube (1993)

Single-species genus of lichen

Sagema is a fungal genus in the family Lecanoraceae. It is a monotypic genus, containing the single species Sagema potentillae, a crustose lichen found in Nepal. The lichen forms a thin, whitish crust with small dark reddish-brown fruiting discs surrounded by pale rims. It is set apart from related lichens by its unusually thick-walled ascospores, each measuring about 30–40 micrometres long.

== Taxonomy ==
The genus Sagema and its only species, S. potentillae, were formally described by Martin Grube and Josef Poelt in 1993. The type collection was made in the Langtang area of the Central Himalaya (Nepal) at 4000 m elevation, on dead twigs of Potentilla arbuscula (a shrubby cinquefoil). The holotype is deposited at GZU (Graz), with isotypes at M (Munich) and UPS (Uppsala). The generic name Sagema is an acronym honouring the collectors Sabine and Georg Miehe; the species epithet potentillae refers to the host plant.

Although the authors noted its superficial similarity to members of the Lecanora subfusca group, they segregated it as a new genus because of distinctive microscopic features. They assigned it, provisionally, to Lecanoraceae; modern catalogues continue to list Sagema in that family.

== Description ==
The lichen body (thallus) is a thin, crust‑like film that is best developed around the fruiting discs. It is whitish to dirty grey‑white and lacks a distinct outer skin (ecorticate). The algal partner consists of small, rounded green cells (the photosynthetic component of the lichen).

The reproductive discs (apothecia, the tiny spore‑producing cups) are often grouped, 0.3–0.6 mm across, and sit directly on the thallus with a slightly constricted base. The disc is dark red‑brown and usually matt. A pale, whitish to ochre rim made from thallus tissue (the thalline margin) surrounds the disc. When wetted, the projecting tips of the spore sacs can appear as minute clear points under a dissecting microscope. Around the rim there is a ring‑like band of tiny pores (pseudocyphella), essentially minute ventilation gaps between layers of the rim.

Under the microscope, the apothecial rim has a firm outer layer built from vertical, strongly gelatinised fungal threads; a water‑repellent, cottony core (medulla) descends to the substrate. The spore‑bearing layer (hymenium) is about 120–140 micrometre (μm) tall with a pale‑brown top (epihymenium). The supporting threads (paraphyses) are linked by side‑connections (anastomoses). The spore sacs (asci) are functionally unitunicate (a single functional wall) with a beak‑like apex; iodine stains show a derived Lecanora‑type apex (the tholus forms an extended, laterally spreading cap). The eight ascospores per ascus are broadly to narrowly ellipsoid, relatively large (about 30–40 × 15–21 μm), and have an unusually thick, multi‑layered wall 2–4 μm thick—a key character that sets the genus apart. Routine sspot tests on the thallus rim are negative or only faintly yellowish (K−, C−, KC−/pale yellow, PD−). Thin-layer chromatography detects isousnic acid together with an unidentified triterpenoid.

== Habitat and distribution ==
Sagema potentillae was described from the Langtang area of the Central Himalaya (Nepal), at 4000 m elevation. It grew on thin, dead twigs of Potentilla arbuscula (shrubby cinquefoil) and was noted together with species from two genera of foliose lichenss, Cetraria and Nephroma.
