= Japewiella =

Scientific classification
- Kingdom: Fungi
- Division: Ascomycota
- Class: Lecanoromycetes
- Order: Lecanorales
- Family: Lecanoraceae
- Genus: Japewiella; Printzen (2000)

Type species
- Japewiella carrollii (Coppins & P.James) Printzen (2000)

Species
- J. carrollii J. djagensis J. dollypartoniana J. pacifica J. pruinosula J. tavaresiana J. variabilis

Genus of fungi

Japewiella is a genus of lichen in the family Lecanoraceae. It was circumscribed in 2000 by German botanist and lichenologist Christian Printzen as a segregate of the genus Japewia. The genus name of Japewia was in honour of Peter Wilfrid James (1930 - 2014), who was an English botanist (Mycology and Lichenology). The genus was circumscribed by Christian Printzen in Bryologist vol.102 on page 715 in 1999.

The type, Japewiella carrollii, is an oceanic species that occurs in maritime regions of Europe and Macaronesia.

== Description ==
Japewiella species are crust lichens that grow on bark. They are characterized by their biatorine apothecia, thick-walled, simple ascospores, eight-spored asci with a conspicuous masse axiale (similar to asci found in members of genus Lecidella). They have a well-developed excipulum (a saucer-shaped rim around the hymenium) comprising branched and anastomosing, gelatinized hyphae.

== Species ==
- Japewiella carrollii (Coppins & P.James) Printzen (2000) – Temperate Eurasia
- Japewiella djagensis (Zahlbr.) Printzen (2000) – East Asia
- Japewiella dollypartoniana J.L.Allen & Lendemer (2015) – Appalachian Mountains of eastern North America
- Japewiella pacifica Printzen (2000) – North America
- Japewiella pruinosula (Müll.Arg.) Kantvilas (2011) – Australia
- Japewiella tavaresiana (H.Magn.) Printzen (2000) – Eurasia, Europe
- Japewiella variabilis Elix & McCarthy (2018) – Australia
