= Cladidium =

Scientific classification
- Domain: Eukaryota
- Kingdom: Fungi
- Division: Ascomycota
- Class: Lecanoromycetes
- Order: Lecanorales
- Family: Lecanoraceae
- Genus: Cladidium; Hafellner (1984)

Type species
- Cladidium thamnitis (Tuck.) Hafellner (1984)

Species
- C. bolanderi C. thamnitis

Genus of lichens

Cladidium is a genus of two species of lichen in the family Lecanoraceae. Cladidium was circumscribed by Josef Hafellner in 1984 with C. thamnitis assigned as the type species. C. bolanderi was added to the genus in 1989.
