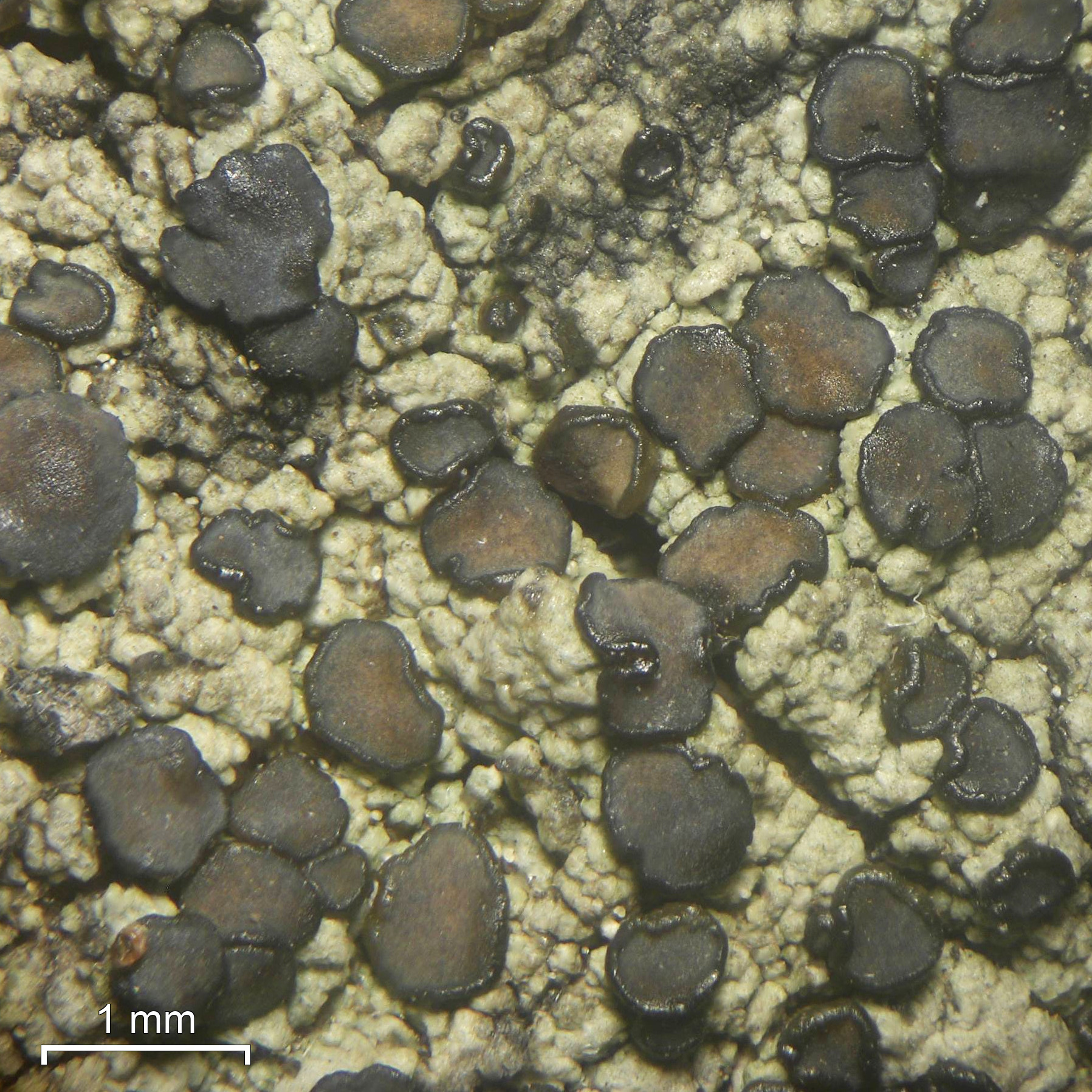
- Palicella schizochromatica

Scientific classification
- Domain: Eukaryota
- Kingdom: Fungi
- Division: Ascomycota
- Class: Lecanoromycetes
- Order: Lecanorales
- Family: Lecanoraceae
- Genus: Palicella; Rodr.Flakus & Printzen (2014)

Type species
- Palicella glaucopa (Hook.f. & Taylor) Rodr.Flakus & Printzen (2014)

Species
- P. anakeestiicola P. filamentosa P. glaucopa P. lueckingii P. schizochromatica P. xantholeuca

= Palicella =

Genus of lichens

Palicella is a genus of crustose lichens in the family Lecanoraceae. It contains six species.

== Taxonomy ==
The genus was circumscribed in 2014 by lichenologists Pamela Rodriguez-De Flakus and Christian Printzen to accommodate the type species, Palicella glaucopa (formerly placed in the genus Lecidea), and two closely related species, P. filamentosa and P. schizochromatica. Molecular analyses of these lichens revealed a monophyletic clade that is sister to representatives from two Lecanoraceae genera, Lecanora symmicta and Pyrrhospora quernea. Two additional species were transferred to Palicella from Lecanora in 2019.

== Description ==
Palicella species have biatorine apothecia, which are often darkened (by the pigment known as Cinereorufa-green), an exciple (a saucer-shaped rim around the hymenium) consisting of radiating, narrow hyphae with elongated lumina, and a hymenium with branched and sparsely anastomosed paraphyses. Other microscopic characteristics include an ascus with a broad axial body surrounded by a distinct darker staining layer, and ascospores with a narrow ellipsoid shape.

== Species ==
As of March 2023, Species Fungorum (as listed in the Catalogue of Life) accepts six species in Palicella:

- Palicella anakeestiicola (Lendemer & E.Tripp) S.Y.Kondr., L.Lőkös & Farkas (2019)
- Palicella filamentosa (Stirt.) Rodr.Flakus & Printzen (2014)
- Palicella glaucopa (Hook.f. & Taylor) Rodr.Flakus & Printzen (2014)
- Palicella lueckingii Rodr.Flakus (2018)
- Palicella schizochromatica (Pérez-Ort., T.Sprib. & Printzen) Rodr.Flakus & Printzen (2014)
- Palicella xantholeuca (Müll.Arg.) Fryday & Orange (2019)
