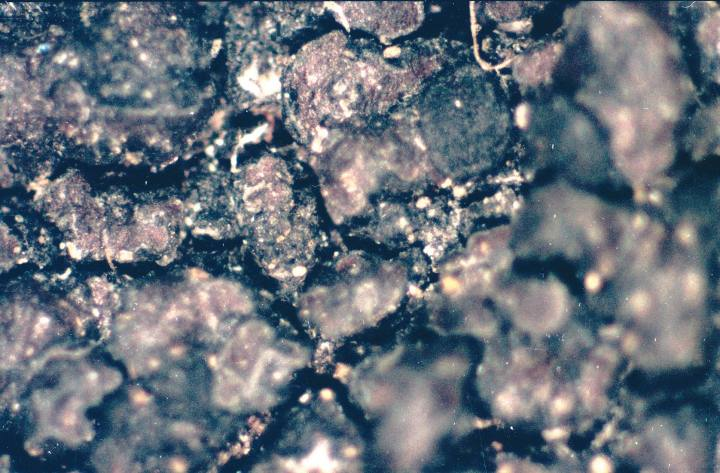
- Miriquidica deusta

Scientific classification
- Kingdom: Fungi
- Division: Ascomycota
- Class: Lecanoromycetes
- Order: Lecanorales
- Family: Lecanoraceae
- Genus: Miriquidica; Hertel & Rambold (1987)

Type species
- Miriquidica complanata (Körb.) Hertel & Rambold (1987)

= Miriquidica =

Genus of lichen-forming fungi

Miriquidica is a genus of lichen in the family Lecanoraceae. The genus was circumscribed in 1987 by the lichenologists Hannes Hertel and Gerhard Rambold, with Miriquidica complanata assigned as the type species. According to Dictionary of the Fungi (10th edition, 2008), the widespread genus contains 23 species, found predominantly in arctic-alpine regions.

== Species ==
- Miriquidica aeneovirens (Müll.Arg.) Hafellner (2018)
- Miriquidica atrofulva (Sommerf.) A.J.Schwab & Rambold (1990)
- Miriquidica complanata (Körb.) Hertel & Rambold (1987)
- Miriquidica deusta (Stenh.) Hertel & Rambold (1987)
- Miriquidica effigurata Fryday & Coppins (2008) – New Zealand
- Miriquidica garovaglii (Schaer.) Hertel & Rambold (1987)
- Miriquidica griseoatra (Hoffm.) Hertel & Rambold (1987)
- Miriquidica gyrizans Fryday (2020) – Alaska
- Miriquidica intrudens (H.Magn.) Hertel & Rambold (1987)
- Miriquidica invadens Hafellner, Obermayer & Tretiach (2014)
- Miriquidica leucophaea (Flörke ex Rabenh.) Hertel & Rambold (1987)
- Miriquidica lulensis (Hellb.) Hertel & Rambold (1987)
- Miriquidica majae Tønsberg (2019) – Northern Europe
- Miriquidica nigroleprosa (Vain.) Hertel & Rambold (1987)
- Miriquidica paanaensis (Räsänen & Laurila) M.P.Andreev (2004)
- Miriquidica pycnocarpa (Körb.) M.P.Andreev (2004)
- Miriquidica scotopholis (Tuck.) B.D.Ryan & Timdal (2004)
- Miriquidica squamulosa Fryday (2008) – New Zealand
- Miriquidica stellata Fryday (2008) – New Zealand
- Miriquidica subplumbea (Anzi) Cl.Roux (2011)
- Miriquidica verrucariicola (B.D.Ryan) K.Knudsen & Kocourk. (2015)
- Miriquidica yunnanensis Lu L.Zhang & X.Zhao (2013) – China
