= Bryonora =

Scientific classification
- Domain: Eukaryota
- Kingdom: Fungi
- Division: Ascomycota
- Class: Lecanoromycetes
- Order: Lecanorales
- Family: Lecanoraceae
- Genus: Bryonora; Poelt (1983)

Type species
- Bryonora castanea (Hepp) Poelt (1983)

Species
- B. castanea B. castaneoides B. curvescens B. granulata B. microlepis B. peltata

Genus of lichens

Bryonora is a genus of lichen-forming fungi in the family Lecanoraceae. These lichens typically grow on soil, mosses, plant debris, or rocks in arctic or alpine environments. The genus was circumscribed in 1983 by lichenologist Josef Poelt, with Bryonora castanea assigned as the type species.

== Taxonomy ==
Phylogenetic studies have confirmed Bryonora's placement within the Lecanoraceae. The genus Bryodina, previously considered separate, is now treated as a synonym of Bryonora based on molecular evidence.

As of 2022, the genus comprises 15 accepted species. Recent taxonomic changes include the description of a new species, Bryonora microlepis, and the transfer of Lecanora castaneoides to Bryonora as B. castaneoides.

== Description ==
Bryonora species exhibit various thallus types, including crustose (forming a crust-like layer), squamulose (composed of small, scale-like structures), and subfruticose (somewhat shrub-like). The reproductive structures, called apothecia, can vary in appearance among species, with some having a distinct rim (margin) around the spore-producing surface (disc).

Some Bryonora species contain lichen substances such as norstictic acid or stictic acid, which can be detected through chemical tests and are useful for identification.

Key features distinguishing Bryonora from other genera in the Lecanoraceae include its ecology, thallus structure, and details of its reproductive structures.

== Habitat and distribution ==
Bryonora species are primarily found in arctic and alpine regions. They have been reported from various locations including Norway, Sweden, Svalbard, and high-elevation areas in Asia. These lichens often grow on soil, dead mosses, plant debris, or rocks, and some species show preferences for particular substrates or environmental conditions.

== Species ==
- Bryonora castanea (Hepp) Poelt (1983)
- Bryonora castaneoides (H.Magn.) Arup, M.Svensson & M.Westb. (2022)
- Bryonora curvescens (Mudd) Poelt (1983)
- Bryonora granulata Fryday (2012) – Falkland Islands
- Bryonora microlepis Haugan & Timdal (2022) – Norway
- Bryonora peltata Øvstedal (2001) – Antarctica
