= Auguste-Marie Hue =

French lichenologist

Father Auguste-Marie Hue (15 August 1840 – 22 June 1917) was a French lichenologist.

== Biography ==
Hue was born on 15 August 1840, in Saint-Saëns, Seine-Maritime. He was ordained as a priest in 1865. From 1890 to 1915 he was a chaplain at the Petites Sœurs des Pauvres in Levallois-Perret. He studied the lichens collected by the scientific expedition to Tunisia, the reports of which were published by Narcisse Théophile Patouillard (1854–1926). He also studied the lichens brought back by the French Antarctic Expeditions (1903–1905 and 1908–1910), commanded by Jean-Baptiste Charcot (1867–1936). Father Auguste Barthélemy Langlois (1832–1900) sent him specimens collected in Louisiana. Together with François Jules Harmand he published the exsiccata Lichenes in Lotharingia A. J. Harmand. Hue has been credited for having introduced the lichen term fastigiate cortex in a 1906 publication. Hue died on 22 June 1917, in Levallois-Perret.

In 1938, Carroll William Dodge and Gladys Elizabeth Baker published Huea, which is a genus of lichenized fungi in the family Lecanoraceae and named in Hue's honour. Hueidea a monotypic genus of fungi was published by Kantvilas & P.M.McCarthy in 2003.

== Selected publications ==
- Hue, A.M. (1892). Lichens Exotici a Professore W. Nylander Descripti vel Recogniti. Paris: G. Masson. pp. 1–378.
- Hue, A.M. (1898). "Lichenes extra-europaei a pluribus collectoribus ad Museum Parisiense missi". Nouvelles Archives du Muséum d'Histoire Naturelle. 3. 10: 213–219.
- Hue, A.M. (1909). "Lichenum generis Crocyniae Mass". Mémoires de la Société Nationale des Sciences Naturelles et Mathématiques de Cherbourg. 37: 223–254.
- Hue, A.M. (1910). "Lichenes. Morphologice et Anatomice. [4]". Nouvelles Archives du Muséum d'Histoire Naturelle. 5. 2 (1): 1–120.
- Hue, A.M. (1915). Ouvrage publié sous les auspices du Ministère de l'instruction publique sous la direction de L. Joubin. Deuxième Expédition Antarctique française (1908-1910), commandée par le dr Jean Charcot. Sciences naturelles: documents scientifiques Lichens (in French). Paris: Masson et cie. pp. 1–202.

== See also ==
- Category:Taxa named by Auguste-Marie Hue
