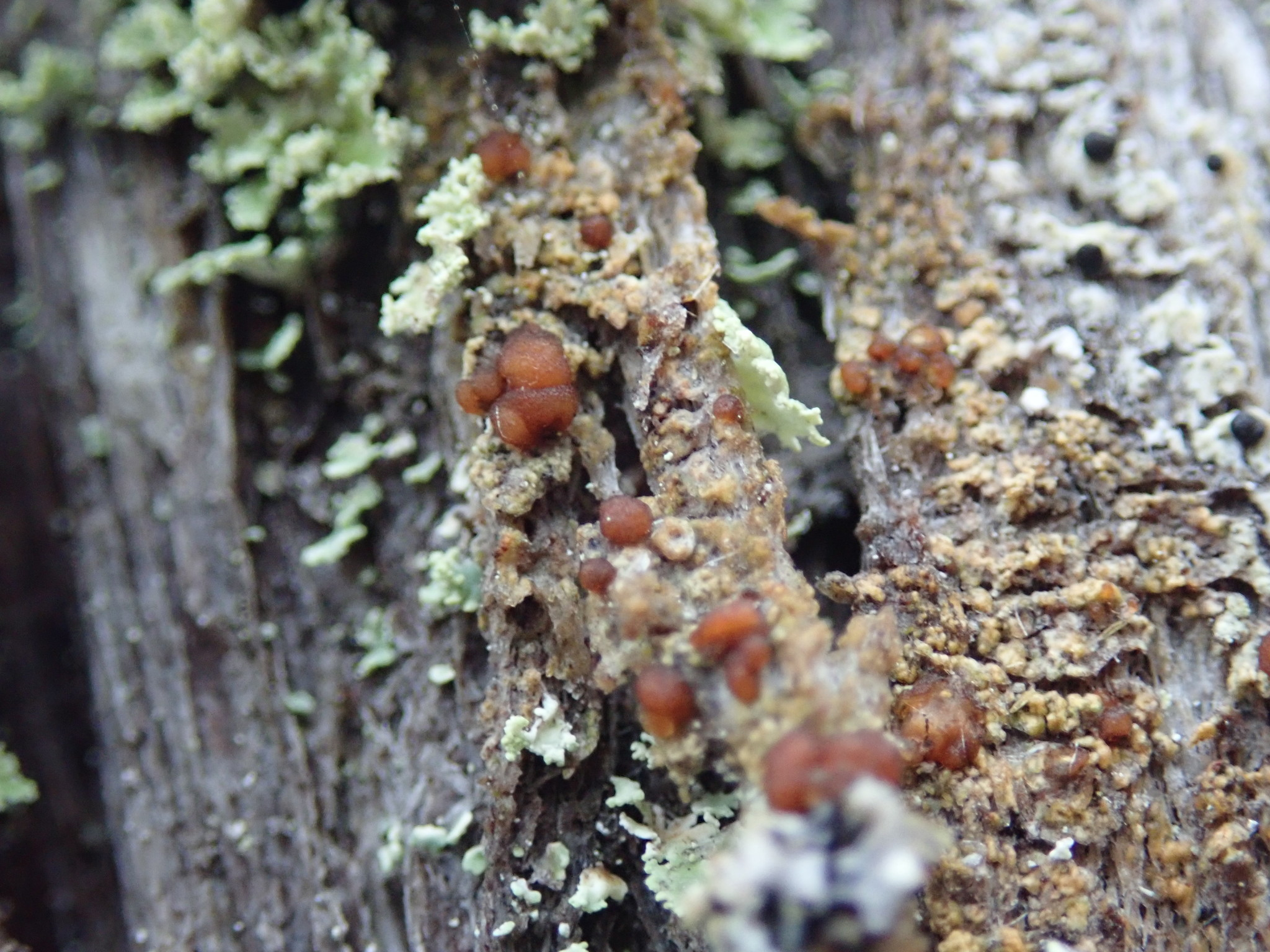
- Japewia tornoensis

Scientific classification
- Domain: Eukaryota
- Kingdom: Fungi
- Division: Ascomycota
- Class: Lecanoromycetes
- Order: Lecanorales
- Family: Lecanoraceae
- Genus: Japewia; Tønsberg (1990)

Type species
- Japewia tornoënsis (Nyl.) Tønsberg (1990)

Species
- J. aliphatica J. gyrophorica J. subaurifera J. tavaresiana J. tornoënsis

= Japewia =

Genus of lichen-forming fungi

Japewia is a genus of lichen-forming fungi in the family Lecanoraceae. The genus was circumscribed in 1990 by the Norwegian lichenologist Tor Tønsberg, who assigned J. tornoënsis as the type species. The new genus is named in honour of Peter Wilfred James, a notable lichenologist, with Japewia being derived from the first letters of his initials (Ja) and his surname (Pe) followed by a typical Latin suffix (-wia).

== Description ==
Japewia species incorporate green algae from the order Chlorococcales into their structure. The main body of the lichen, the thallus, is crust-like and firmly attached to the surface it grows on. The apothecia (fruiting bodies) are typically attached to the thallus and can either have a distinct margin or lack one. These apothecia are biatorine (simple and cup-shaped) and chestnut-coloured.

The paraphyses (sterile filamentous cells in the apothecia) and the exciple (the outer layer surrounding the apothecia) have hyphae (fungal filaments) that are coated with a gelatinous sheath. These hyphae are dark on the outside, branched, and interconnected. When treated with potassium hydroxide soluition (K), the gelatinous sheath dissolves. The tips of the paraphyses form an epihymenium, which is a layer above the hymenium (the spore-producing surface) and is red-brown or brown in colour.

The asci (spore-producing cells) have an amyloid tholus, meaning they react to iodine and stain blue. Each ascus typically contains eight ascospores.

== Species ==
- Japewia aliphatica Malíček, Palice, Tønsberg & Vondrák (2020)
- Japewia gyrophorica Palice, Malíček & Vondrák (2023)
- Japewia subaurifera Muhr & Tønsberg (1990)
- Japewia tavaresiana (H.Magn.) Coppins & A.M.Coppins (2007)
- Japewia tornoensis (Nyl.) Tønsberg (1990)
