= Gladys Elizabeth Baker =

American mycologist (1908–2007)

- Born: July 22, 1908; Iowa City, Iowa, U.S.
- Died: July 7, 2007 (aged 98); Peoria, Arizona, U.S.
- Known for: Pioneering Medical Mycology, Myxomycetes
- Scientific career
- Fields: Mycology, botany, zoology, history, embryology
- Author abbrev. (botany): G.E.Baker

Gladys Elizabeth Baker (July 22, 1908 – July 7, 2007) was an American mycologist, teacher, and botanical illustrator, known for her extensive work in biological and mycological education, and the morphological study of myxomycete fructifications (Baker 1933). She further contributed studies to the Island Ecosystems Integrated Research Program of the U. S. International Biological Program (Stoner et al., 1975).

== Early life and education ==
Baker was born on July 22, 1908, in Iowa City, Iowa, to Richard Phillip Baker of England and Katherine Riedelbauch. Gladys' mother was of German descent and taught music at Lamar College in Missouri, living in a boardinghouse. Here she met Gladys' father teaching secondary school and music while preparing for the bar exam. In 1901, Katherine and Richard both left Lamar College for Anna Illinois Academy, later marrying on February 22, 1902, in Glasford, Illinois (Green et al., 2009). Richard Baker constructed a business making and marketing three-dimensional mathematical models. In 1905, Richard began teaching mathematics at the University of Iowa while pursuing both a physics and mathematics doctorate at the University of Chicago. Katherine cared for their two daughters, Gladys and Frances, kept a garden of flowers, and maintained the artistically and musically enriched living environment of the Baker household. Gladys referred to her sheltered, yet intellectually stimulating childhood with the constant presence of "music, books, and interesting conversations with the family and visitors, all combining to make it a perfect environment in which to grow".

In 1926, Baker graduated with honors from Iowa City High School, and subsequently toured around Europe with her older sister, Frances. Frances received her doctorate from the University of Chicago, later teaching mathematics at Mount Holyoke College and Vassar College. Baker majored in history and botany, and minored in zoology for her undergraduate studies at the University of Iowa in 1930 (Green et al., 2009). She continued in academics for a master's degree in mycology and minor in embryology at the University of Iowa under the guidance of mycologist G.W. Martin. In 1931, Baker spent a summer at the Friday Harbor Marine Lab of the University of Washington, researching invertebrate zoology and marine phytoplankton.

== Career ==
After graduating and having her master's thesis work on the morphological study of myxomycete fructifications published in 1933 by the University of Iowa Studies in Natural History, T.H. McBride employed her as a staff biological artist. Baker then drew illustrations for T.H. McBride's and G.W. Martin's 1934 publication, the worldwide monograph of "The Myxomycetes" presently published by Macmillan Company of New York City. Shortly after in 1933, Baker went on to earn a doctorate in mycology at Washington University in St. Louis under the direction and guidance of Carroll W. Dodge (Green et al., 2009). Awarded the Jessie R. Barr Fellowship, Baker studied general mycology, as well as medical mycology for two years, spending her postdoctoral year in the Botany Department at Washington University. During this year, she studied unique specimens of lichens and the interactions with their parasites obtained during a controversial Antarctic expedition. Baker also conducted a significant monographic study of the genus Helicogloea from 1933 to 1935. In the middle of her monographic research in 1934, she was elected a member of Sigma Xi at Washington University, and continually cherished her father's Sigma Xi pin. Resigning from her post doctorate position in order to teach, Baker started teaching in the Biology Department at Hunter College in New York in 1936. During her four years there, she rekindled her passion for music.

Throughout her time at Vassar College beginning in 1940, Baker served as chair of the Plant Science Department for thirteen years, directing three graduate students as well. She later began teaching the first course ever in medical mycology, and became a charter member of the Medical Mycological Society of the Americas and a fellow of the American Association for the Advancement of Science in 1938 ("Martin-Baker Award" 2013). In 1945, she studied the emerging medically and commercially important genus of Aspergillus, gearing her research toward medical fungi (Baker 1945). Following her departure from Vassar, Baker traveled to the University of Hawaii, at Manoa, and taught at the institution from 1961 to 1973, as well as conducted many fungal isolation projects (Baker 1968). She oversaw the work of thirteen graduate students for advanced degrees in general and medical mycology (Baker 1977). Her students have described Baker as "an effective and enthusiastic teacher," a mycologist and scientist with the "highest integrity," and a "warm and caring friend" ("Martin-Baker Award", 2013). Fellow scientists and peer mycologists continue to admire the relics of her memorable work, including the twenty-one illustrated plates for MacBride and Martin, The Myxomycetes (1934), the nuclear behavior and monographic studies of the genus Penicillium and Helicogloea (Baker 1944), The Antarctic Lichens (1938) with C.W. Dodge, and the cytology and ecology of microfungi. They also remember her as "a lady of many interests and talents, all executed with a style consistent with the English traditions of her father."

Baker retired in Sun City, Arizona after her time at the University of Hawaii, at Manoa in 1973, surrounded by a culture-enriched environment. Music, distinguished novels, southwestern Indian culture, Chinese art treasures, and gardens filled her home in combination with her early childhood influences and present pursuits. Baker continued to write using her old typewriter, eventually authoring an autobiography (Dunn et al., 2009).

== Death ==
Baker died on July 7, 2007, aged 98 at her home in Peoria, Arizona.

== Musical life ==
Baker had cultivated a passion for music early in life, influenced by her musical parents and the choral household she grew up in. Her parents, Katherine and Richard, together established and performed with Iowa City's first chamber music ensemble (Green et al., 2009). In 1936, while teaching in the Biology Department at Hunter College in New York, she belonged to the New York Oratorio Society, a choir performing music in the Oratorio style that continues to present annual performances of Handel's Messiah at Carnegie Hall.

== Notable publications ==
- Baker, G.E. (1933). A comparative morphological study of the myxomycete fructification. Univ. Iowa Studies, Studies *Nat History. 14:35
- Baker, G.E. (1944). Heterokaryosis in Penicillium notatum. Bull Torrey Bot Club. 71:367–373.
- Baker, G.E. (1944). Nuclear behavior in relation to culture methods for Penicillium notatum. Westling Science. 99:436.
- Baker, G.E. (1945). Conidium formation in species of Aspergilli. Mycologia. 37:582–600.
- Baker, G.E. (1968). Antimycotic activity of fungi isolated from Hawaiian soils. Mycologia. 60:559–570.
- Baker, G.E. (1968). Fungi from the central Pacific region. Mycologia. 60:196–201.

== Legacy ==
- Mount Baker in Antarctica is named for her

== Sources ==
- Baker, G.E. (1933). A comparative morphological study of the myxomycete fructification. Univ. Iowa Studies, Studies Nat History. 14:35
- Baker, G. E. (1944). Heterokaryosis in Penicillium notatum. Bulletin of the Torrey Botanical Club, 71(4), 367–373. Retrieved from https://www.jstor.org/stable/2481310
- Baker, G. E. (1945). Conidium formation in species of aspergilli. Mycologia, 37(5), 582–600. Retrieved from https://www.jstor.org/stable/3754695
- Baker, G. E. (1968). Fungi from the central Pacific region. Mycologia, 60(1), 196–201. Retrieved from https://www.jstor.org/stable/3757325
- Baker, G. E. (1977). The prospect for mycology in the central Pacific. Harold L. Lyon Arboretum, University of Hawaii.
- Martin-Baker Award. (2013). Retrieved November 8, 2013, from https://web.archive.org/web/20131202233116/http://msafungi.org/msa-awards/martin-baker-award/
- Stoner, M. F., Stoner, D. K., & Baker, G. E. (1975). Ecology of fungi in wildland soils along the Mauna Loa transect. Island Ecosystems IRP, US International Biological Program.
- Green, J., & LaDuke, J. (2009). Supplementary Material for Pioneering Women in American Mathematics: The Pre-1940 PhDs. American Mathematical Society.
