= Traponora =

Scientific classification
- Domain: Eukaryota
- Kingdom: Fungi
- Division: Ascomycota
- Class: Lecanoromycetes
- Order: Lecanorales
- Family: Lecanoraceae
- Genus: Traponora; Aptroot (1997)

Type species
- Traponora asterella Aptroot (1997)

Species
- T. asterella T. flavothallina T. fusca T. globosa T. macrospora T. pallida T. varians

Genus of lichens

Traponora is a genus of lichen-forming fungi in the family Lecanoraceae. The genus was circumscribed in 2009 by Dutch lichenologist André Aptroot, with the Papua New Guinean Traponora asterella assigned as the type, and at that time, only species. Four newly described species were added to the genus in a 2009 publication, a species formerly in Pyrrhospora was transferred to the genus in 2017, and a new species from Australia added in 2018. Traponora lichens are predominantly from Australasia, with all species but one known to occur in Papua New Guinea.

== Description ==
Traponora species are small, inconspicuous lichens that grow on trees, and are often overlooked because of their diminutive size—with a thallus typically less than 2 cm (0.8 in). Traponora produces small, lecideoid apothecia, meaning they lack algae and an amphithecium, and are typically black with a carbonaceous exciple (rim) and blackish disc. The apothecia often have a ragged margin, like those of genus Trapelia, for which the genus are named. The asci are of the Lecanora-type, and the ascospores are simple and thick walled. Although the genus has been tentatively assigned to the family Lecanoraceae owing to similarities in ascus structure, its true phylogenetic affiliations are not yet known with certainty.

== Species ==
As of November 2021, Species Fungorum accepts seven species of Traponora.

- Traponora asterella Aptroot (1997) – pantropical
- Traponora flavothallina Kalb & Aptroot (2018) – Australia
- Traponora fusca Aptroot (2010) – Taiwan; Philippines
- Traponora globosa Aptroot (2010) – Papua New Guinea
- Traponora macrospora Aptroot (2010) – Papua New Guinea
- Traponora pallida Aptroot (2010) – Papua New Guinea
- Traponora varians (Ach.) J.Kalb & Kalb (2017) – Thailand
