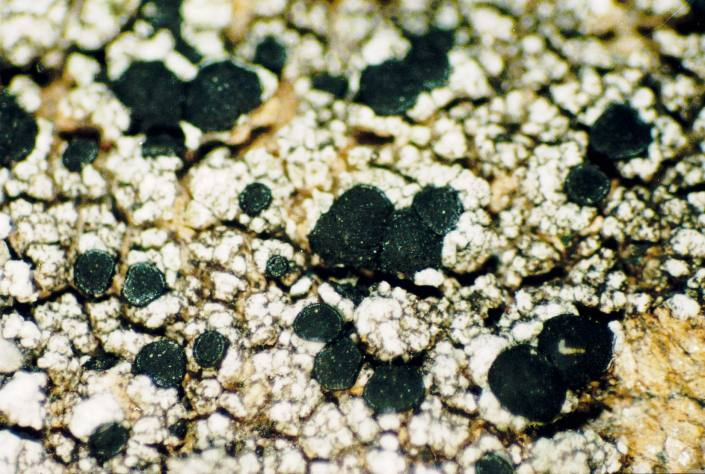
- Lecidella carpathica

Scientific classification
- Kingdom: Fungi
- Division: Ascomycota
- Class: Lecanoromycetes
- Order: Lecanorales
- Family: Lecanoraceae; Körb. (1855)

Type genus
- Lecanora Ach. (1809)

Synonyms
- Scoliciosporaceae Hafellner (1984); Carbonicolaceae Bendiksby & Timdal (2013)

= Lecanoraceae =

Family of lichen-forming fungi

The Lecanoraceae are a family of lichenized fungi in the order Lecanorales. Species of this family have a widespread distribution.

== Taxonomy ==
Lecanoraceae was circumscribed by German lichenologist Gustav Wilhelm Körber in 1855.

== Genera ==
According to a 2024 estimate, Lecanoraceae contains about 715 species distributed amongst 26 genera.

- Adelolecia Hertel & Hafellner (1984) – 4 spp.
- Ameliella Fryday & Coppins (2008) – 2 spp.
- Bryodina Hafellner (2001) – 2 spp.
- Bryonora Poelt (1983) – 11 spp.
- Cladidium Hafellner (1984) – 2 spp.
- Claurouxia D.Hawksw. (1988) – 1 sp.
- Clauzadeana Cl.Roux (1984) – 1 sp.
- Edrudia W.P.Jord. (1980) – 1 sp.
- Flavonora Mazur, Malíček & Śliwa (2025) – 4 spp.
- Frutidella Kalb (1994) – 3 sp.
- Glaucomaria M.Choisy (1929) – 8 spp.
- Huea C.W.Dodge & G.E.Baker (1938) – 25 spp.
- Japewia Tønsberg (1990) – 3 spp.
- Japewiella Printzen (2000) – 7 spp.
- Lecanora Ach. (1809) – 550 spp.
- Lecanoropsis M.Choisy ex Ivanovich (2025) – 23 spp.
- Lecidella Körb. (1855) – 80 spp.
- Miriquidica Hertel & Rambold (1987) – 25 spp.
- Myriolecis Clements (1909) – 34 spp.
- Myrionora R.C.Harris (1988) – 2 spp.
- Nimisora Pérez-Ort., M.Svenss. & J.C.Zamora (2023) – Europe
- Palicella Rodr.Flakus & Printzen (2014) – 3 spp.
- Polyozosia A.Massal. (1855) – 42 spp.
- Protoparmeliopsis Choisy (1929) – 39 spp.
- Psorinia Gotth.Schneid. (1980) – 2 spp.
- Pulvinora Davydov, Yakovch. & Printzen (2021) – 2 spp.
- Punctonora Aptroot (1997) – 1 sp.
- Pyrrhospora Körb. (1855) – 8 spp.
- Rhizoplaca Zopf (1905) – 11 spp.
- Sagema Poelt & Grube (1993) – 1 sp.
- Sedelnikovaea S.Y.Kondr., M.H.Jeong & Hur (2015) –4 spp.
- Straminella M.Choisy (1929) – 6 spp.
- Traponora Aptroot (1997) – 5 spp.
- Tylothallia P.James & R.Kilias (1981) – 3 spp.
- Vainionora Kalb (1991) – 10 spp.
- Xanthosyne Lendemer, R.C.Harris, Brodo & McMullin (2024) – 3 spp.
- Zeora Fr. (1825) – 17 spp.
