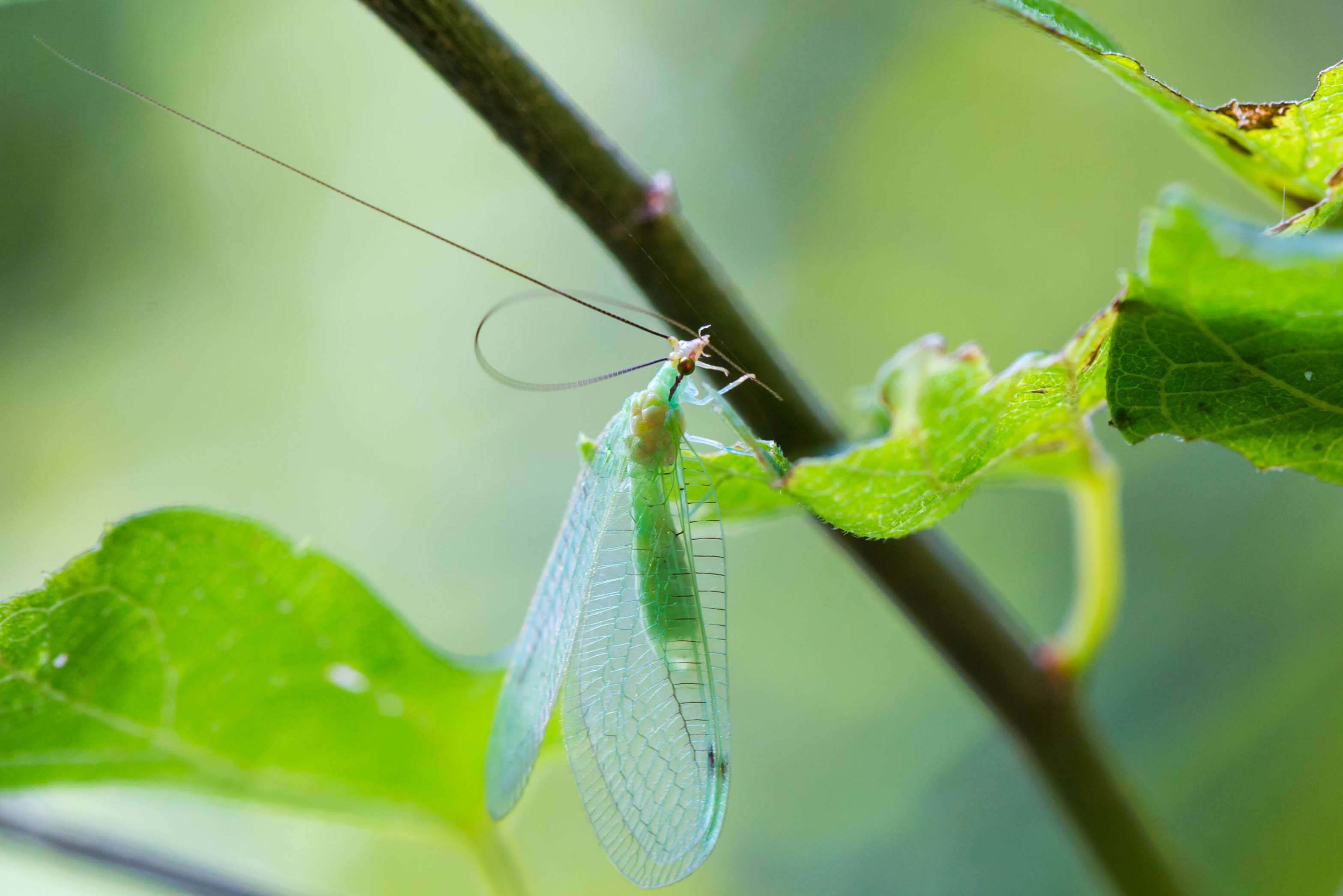
- L. pavida in Tennessee

Scientific classification
- Kingdom: Animalia
- Phylum: Arthropoda
- Clade: Pancrustacea
- Class: Insecta
- Order: Neuroptera
- Family: Chrysopidae
- Tribe: Leucochrysini
- Genus: Leucochrysa
- Species: L. pavida

Binomial name
- Leucochrysa pavida (Hagen, 1861)

= Leucochrysa pavida =

Species of lacewing

Leucochrysa pavida is a species of green lacewing in the family Chrysopidae. They are commonly found in the Americas, with specific accounts in South Carolina, USA and Cordova, Mexico.Leucochrysa pavida is observed commonly in its larval stage, with its adult stage being slightly more difficult to differentiate from other Leucochrysa. They consume soft-bodied arthropods and reproduce sexually.

== Description ==
=== Adults ===
Leucochrysa pavida is described as being predominantly light green. However, the head is cream to yellow, and the wings are pale, almost completely clear. They also have two lateral black stripes on the thorax. While Leucochrysa tend to look similar, Leucochrysa pavida are unique in that they are larger than their relatives and have a green, unmarked frons and vertex.

=== Larvae ===
The larvae of Leucochrysa pavida are often lichen-clad. This means they use lichen and other tree litter, including pollen and moss, to camouflage themselves from predators. This disguise is also used to hunt. It leaves them with an appearance akin to a piece of old bark. Without the lichen, the larvae of Leucochrysa pavida appear white with black spots covered in spines. Their mandibles range from bright to dark red. The larvae of other species, including Eublemmistis chlorozonea, also use lichen in their larval stage as a form of camouflage.

== Habitat ==
Adult Leucochrysa pavida are typically found on the leaves of trees that shed annually. Their larvae are found on the bark of trees or among forest litter, with moderate to high lichen cover, as they use the lichen to hide and hunt. The lichen type they are most commonly found using is Lecanora strobalina and Myelochroa aurulenta. Although the larva use the lichen, they are often found on bark near lichen, not on it. Their eggs are often laid in the leaves/bark of trees that host these lichen species. In the Eastern United States, Leucochrysa pavida are found more commonly than their relatives.

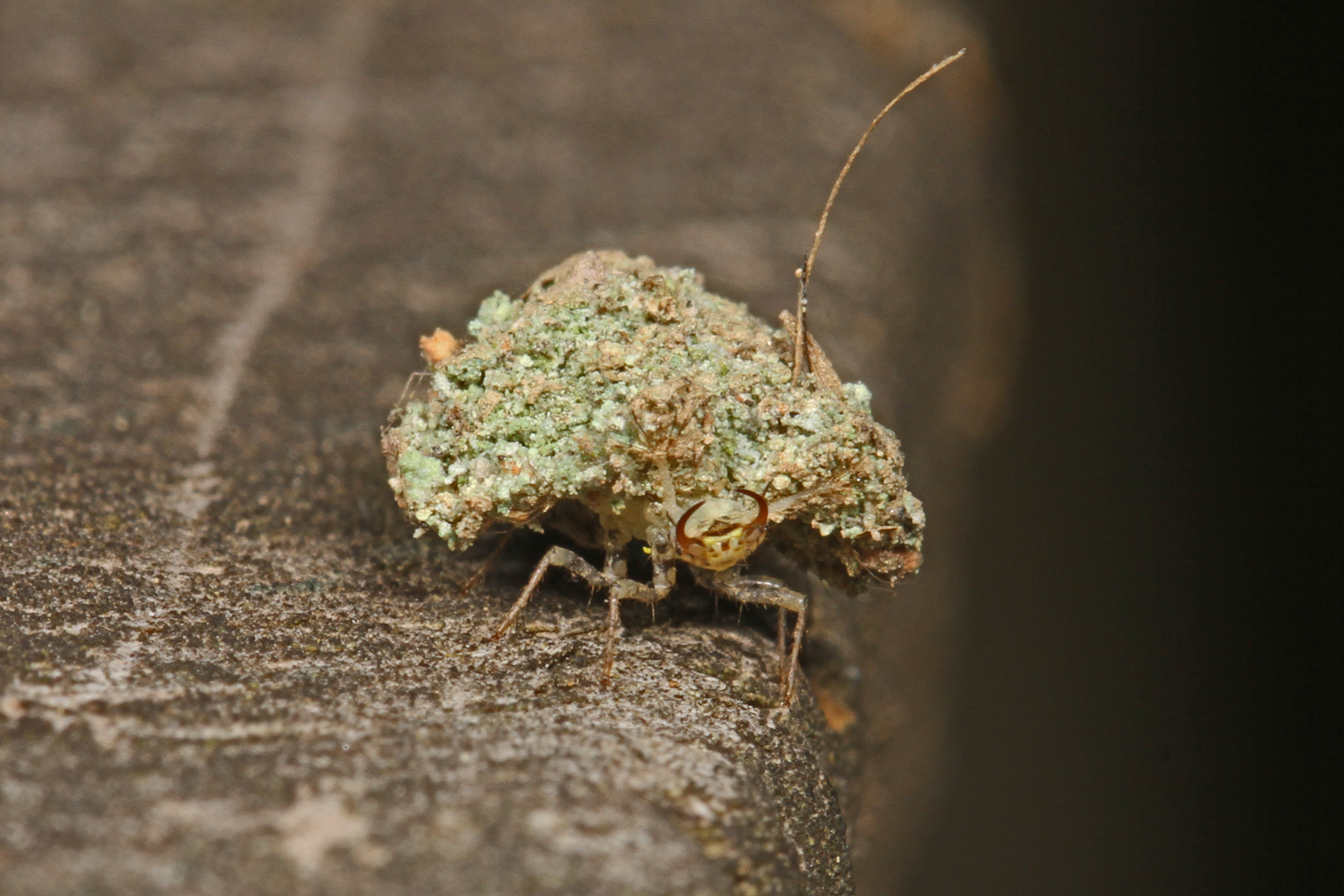
L. pavida larva in Virginia

== Feeding ==
=== Adults ===
The adult Leucochrysa consume a variety of foods, including nectar, aphids, and other small insects like mites.

=== Larvae ===
The Leucochrysa pavida larvae eat aphids, mites, and other small soft arthropods.

== Reproduction ==
Mature Leucochrysa pavida sexually reproduce, and the females lay eggs. From hatching to adulthood, Leucochrysa can take anywhere from 47-80 days to develop, and fluctuations in temperature affect development, with development taking longer in colder environments.
