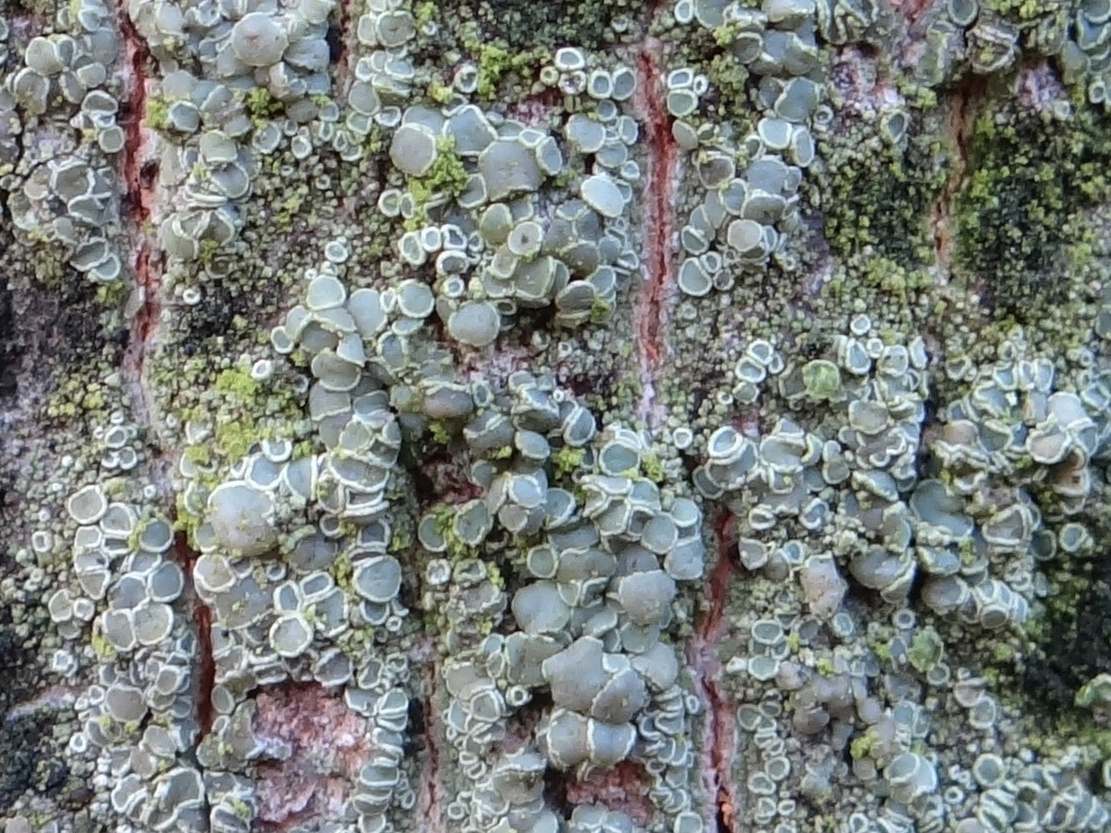
- Straminella conizaeoides

Scientific classification
- Kingdom: Fungi
- Division: Ascomycota
- Class: Lecanoromycetes
- Order: Lecanorales
- Family: Lecanoraceae
- Genus: Straminella; M.Choisy (1929)

Type species
- Straminella varia (Hoffm.) S.Y.Kondr., Lőkös & Farkas (2019)

Species
- S. burgaziae S. conizaeoides S. densa S. printzenii S. varia

= Straminella =

Genus of lichen-forming fungi

Straminella is a genus of lichen-forming fungi in the family Lecanoraceae. Species in this genus typically form yellow-green to beige crusts on bark or wood and are characterised by pale to brownish fruiting bodies. The genus contains usnic acid as its main secondary metabolite, with most species also producing psoromic acid. It has a scattered distribution across North America, North Africa, Europe, East Asia, and Australia.

== Taxonomy ==
Straminella was proposed by the French lichenologist Maurice Choisy in 1929 as a new genus with Lecanora varia as its type species, characterised by a yellow thallus and a suite of reproductive traits (including claviform asci and filiform, curved conidia). In a 1969 study of Lecanora, Gerhard Eigler accepted Straminella and applied it to several usnic acid, yellow-green taxa, including L. conizaeoides, L. expallens, L. polytropa, L. saligna, L. subintricata, and L. symmicta. Josef Hafellner also listed Straminella as a genus in 1984, although some later classifications retained these species within a broad Lecanora concept.

Modern molecular phylogenetics revived the genus for what many authors had been calling the Lecanora varia group, and supported Straminella as a distinct, monophyletic lineage within the Rhizoplaca–Protoparmeliopsis sensu lato assemblage (the "MPRPS" clade) of Lecanoraceae. In these analyses, Straminella occupies an intermediate position between the Rhizoplaca–Lecanora polytropa complex and the Protoparmeliopsis group, a placement recovered in both single-gene trees (for example ITS and mitochondrial mtSSU) and multi-locus datasets that include nuclear ribosomal ITS, mitochondrial SSU rDNA, and the protein-coding genes RPB1 and RPB2.

A 2025 revision refined the genus concept and revisited some earlier circumscriptions within the group. It treated Straminella bullata and S. maheui as belonging to a separate, fruticose lineage and recommended retaining the name Rhizoplaca maheui for that taxon, excluding it from Straminella pending further study. The same work argued that earlier broad uses of Straminella for many usnic acid, yellow-green Lecanora species combined unrelated lineages that molecular data place in other genera, including clades treated as Zeora and Lecanoropsis.

== Description ==
Straminella species form mainly crustose, yellow-green to beige thalli that are usually esorediate, although S. conizaeoides may form soredia. The apothecia are lecanorine and often numerous, with discs ranging from pale yellow to brownish or greenish tones and becoming darkened in S. varia and S. printzenii; the asci are Lecanora-type and produce simple, hyaline spores, and the conidia are slender and curved.

Usnic acid is the main secondary metabolite; most species also contain psoromic acid and 20-O-demethylpsoromic acid, while S. conizaeoides produces fumarprotocetraric acid instead.

== Habitat and distribution ==
Species are most often found on bark or wood. S. conizaeoides tolerates a broad range of low-pH substrates, and S. printzenii is lichenicolous (reported from Umbilicaria and Psorinia). The genus is currently known from North America, North Africa, Europe, East Asia and Australia.

== Species ==
- Straminella burgaziae (I.Martínez & Aragón) S.Y.Kondr., Lőkös & Farkas (2019)
- Straminella conizaeoides (Nyl. ex Cromb.) S.Y.Kondr., Lőkös & Farkas (2019)
- Straminella densa (Śliwa & Wetmore) S.Y.Kondr., Lőkös & Farkas (2019)
- Straminella printzenii (Pérez-Ort., M.Vivas & Hafellner) Pérez-Ort. & Ivanovich-Hichins (2025)
- Straminella varia (Hoffm.) S.Y.Kondr., Lőkös & Farkas (2019)

The 2026 study by Ivanovich-Hichins and colleagues mentioned additional Lecanora species that have been suggested for the varia-group but were not placed in Straminella due to a lack of molecular data.
