= List of Leucochrysa species =

This is a list of 182 species in Leucochrysa, a genus of green lacewings in the family Chrysopidae.

== Leucochrysa species ==
- Leucochrysa adamsi Penny, 2001^{i c g}
- Leucochrysa affinis de Freitas & Penny, 2001^{c g}
- Leucochrysa aleura (Banks, 1944)^{i c g}
- Leucochrysa alloneura (Banks, 1946)^{i c g}
- Leucochrysa alternata Navás, 1913^{i c g}
- Leucochrysa amazonica Navás, 1913^{i c g}
- Leucochrysa americana Banks, 1897^{i c g}
- Leucochrysa amistadensis Penny, 2001^{i c g}
- Leucochrysa anae de Freitas, 2007^{c g}
- Leucochrysa anchietai (Navás, 1922)^{i c g}
- Leucochrysa angrandi (Navás, 1911)^{c g}
- Leucochrysa antennalis (Navás, 1932)^{i c g}
- Leucochrysa antica Navás, 1913^{i c g}
- Leucochrysa apicalis Banks, 1915^{i c g}
- Leucochrysa apicata (Navás, 1926)^{i c g}
- Leucochrysa arizonica (Banks, 1906)^{i c g}
- Leucochrysa askanes (Banks, 1946)^{i c g}
- Leucochrysa azevedoi Navás, 1913^{i c g}
- Leucochrysa barrei Freitas and Penny, 2001^{i c g}
- Leucochrysa bedoci Navás, 1924^{i c g}
- Leucochrysa benoisti Navás, 1933^{i c g}
- Leucochrysa benoistina Navás, 1934^{i c g}
- Leucochrysa bolivari Banks, 1944^{c g}
- Leucochrysa boliviana (Banks, 1915)^{i c g}
- Leucochrysa boxi Navás, 1930^{i c g}
- Leucochrysa brasilica (Navás, 1913)^{i c g}
- Leucochrysa bruneola de Freitas & Penny, 2001^{c g}
- Leucochrysa callota Banks, 1915^{i c g}
- Leucochrysa camposi (Navás, 1913)^{i c g}
- Leucochrysa catarinae de Freitas & Penny, 2001^{c g}
- Leucochrysa caucella Banks, 1910^{i c g}
- Leucochrysa centralis Navás, 1913^{i c g}
- Leucochrysa cerverai (Navás, 1922)^{i c g}
- Leucochrysa championi Navás, 1914^{i c g}
- Leucochrysa christophei Banks, 1938^{i c g}
- Leucochrysa cidae de Freitas, 2007^{c g}
- Leucochrysa clara (McLachlan, 1867)^{i c g}
- Leucochrysa clepsydra Banks, 1918^{i c g}
- Leucochrysa clystera Banks, 1918^{i c g}
- Leucochrysa colombia (Banks, 1910)^{i c g}
- Leucochrysa compar (Navás, 1921)^{i c g}
- Leucochrysa confusa Freitas and Penny, 2001^{i c g}
- Leucochrysa cornesta (Banks, 1944)^{i c g}
- Leucochrysa cornuta Freitas and Penny, 2001^{i c g}
- Leucochrysa cortesi Navás, 1913^{i c g}
- Leucochrysa cruentata (Schneider, 1851)^{i c g}
- Leucochrysa deminuta LaCroix, 1926^{i c g}
- Leucochrysa diasi (Navás, 1922)^{i c g}
- Leucochrysa digitiformis C. Tauber and Albuquerque in C. Tauber et al., 2008^{i c g}
- Leucochrysa dimidia (Navás, 1925)^{i c g}
- Leucochrysa diversa (Walker, 1853)^{i c g}
- Leucochrysa dolichocera (Navás, 1913)^{i c g}
- Leucochrysa duarte Banks, 1946^{i c g}
- Leucochrysa egregia Navás, 1913^{i c g}
- Leucochrysa ehrhardti Navás, 1929^{i c g}
- Leucochrysa erminea Banks, 1946^{i}
- Leucochrysa eubule (Banks, 1944)^{i c g}
- Leucochrysa euterpe (Banks, 1944)^{i c g}
- Leucochrysa explorata (Hagen, 1861)^{i c g}
- Leucochrysa firmini (Navás, 1924)^{i c g}
- Leucochrysa floridana Banks, 1897^{i c g}
- Leucochrysa forciformis Freitas and Penny, 2001^{i c g}
- Leucochrysa forcipata Penny, 1998^{i c g}
- Leucochrysa furcata Freitas and Penny, 2001^{i c g}
- Leucochrysa fuscinervis Navás, 1914^{i c g}
- Leucochrysa garridoi (Alayo, 1968)^{i c g}
- Leucochrysa gemina (Navás, 1929)^{i c g}
- Leucochrysa geminata Navás, 1913^{i c g}
- Leucochrysa gloriosa (Banks, 1910)^{i c g}
- Leucochrysa gossei (Kimmins, 1940)^{i c g}
- Leucochrysa grisoli (Navás, 1912)^{i c g}
- Leucochrysa guataparensis Freitas and Penny, 2001^{i c g}
- Leucochrysa heriocles (Banks, 1944)^{i c g}
- Leucochrysa horni (Navás, 1932)^{i c g}
- Leucochrysa hybrida (Rambur, 1842)^{i c g}
- Leucochrysa icterica Freitas and Penny, 2001^{i c g}
- Leucochrysa ignatii Navás, 1923^{i c g}
- Leucochrysa incognita Freitas and Penny, 2001^{i c g}
- Leucochrysa indiga (Navás, 1928)^{i c g}
- Leucochrysa inquinata Gerstaecker, 1888^{i c g}
- Leucochrysa insularis (Walker, 1853)^{i c g b}
- Leucochrysa interata Freitas and Penny, 2001^{i c g}
- Leucochrysa intermedia (Schneider, 1851)^{i c g}
- Leucochrysa israeli (Alayo, 1968)^{i c g}
- Leucochrysa kotzbaueri (Navás, 1926)^{i c g}
- Leucochrysa laertes (Banks, 1946)^{i c g}
- Leucochrysa lafoni (Navás, 1911)^{i c g}
- Leucochrysa lancala (Banks, 1944)^{i c g}
- Leucochrysa lateralis Navás, 1913^{i c g}
- Leucochrysa lenora Banks, 1944^{i c g}
- Leucochrysa lestagei Navás, 1922^{i c g}
- Leucochrysa lineata Freitas and Penny, 2001^{i c g}
- Leucochrysa longicornis (Gray in Cuvier, 1832)^{i c g}
- Leucochrysa longistigma (Navás, 1930)^{i c g}
- Leucochrysa loretana Navás, 1935^{i c g}
- Leucochrysa maculosa Freitas and Penny, 2001^{i c g}
- Leucochrysa magnifica (Banks, 1920)^{i c g}
- Leucochrysa mainerina (Navás, 1929)^{i c g}
- Leucochrysa marginalis Banks, 1915^{i c g}
- Leucochrysa maronica Navás, 1915^{i c g}
- Leucochrysa marquezi Navás, 1913^{i c g}
- Leucochrysa melanocera Navás, 1916^{i c g}
- Leucochrysa meridana (Navás, 1927)^{i c g}
- Leucochrysa meteorica Gerstaecker, 1894^{i c g}
- Leucochrysa mexicana Banks, 1900^{i c g}
- Leucochrysa michelini Freitas and Penny, 2001^{i c g}
- Leucochrysa minima Banks, 1918^{i c g}
- Leucochrysa montanola Banks, 1910^{i c g}
- Leucochrysa morenoi (Navás, 1934)^{i c g}
- Leucochrysa morrisoni (Navás, 1914)^{i c g}
- Leucochrysa mortoni LaCroix, 1926^{i c g}
- Leucochrysa nativa (Navás, 1911)^{i c g}
- Leucochrysa navasi (Kimmins, 1940)^{i c g}
- Leucochrysa negata (Navás, 1913)^{i c g}
- Leucochrysa nesites Navás, 1913^{i c g}
- Leucochrysa neuralis Banks, 1910^{i c g}
- Leucochrysa nictheroyana (Navás, 1926)^{i c g}
- Leucochrysa nigrilabris (Banks, 1915)^{i c g}
- Leucochrysa nigrovaria (Walker, 1853)^{i c g}
- Leucochrysa notha Navás, 1913^{i c g}
- Leucochrysa notulata (Navás, 1924)^{i c g}
- Leucochrysa ocampina (Banks, 1941)^{i c g}
- Leucochrysa orthones (Banks, 1946)^{i c g}
- Leucochrysa pacifica (Navás, 1929)^{i c g}
- Leucochrysa pallescens (Banks, 1946)^{i c g}
- Leucochrysa panamana (Banks, 1944)^{i c g}
- Leucochrysa parallela Freitas and Penny, 2001^{i c g}
- Leucochrysa paraquaria (Navás, 1929)^{i c g}
- Leucochrysa pavida (Hagen, 1861)^{i c g b}
- Leucochrysa phaeocephala Navás, 1929^{c g}
- Leucochrysa platyptera Gerstaecker, 1888^{i c g}
- Leucochrysa postica Navás, 1913^{i c g}
- Leucochrysa pretiosa (Banks, 1910)^{i c g}
- Leucochrysa prisca Engel & Grimaldi, 2007^{c g}
- Leucochrysa punctata Banks, 1903^{i c g}
- Leucochrysa radiosa Gerstaecker, 1888^{i c g}
- Leucochrysa ramosa (Navás, 1917)^{i c g}
- Leucochrysa ramosi (Navás, 1916)^{i c g}
- Leucochrysa ratcliffei Penny, 2001^{i c g}
- Leucochrysa reedi Navás, 1919^{i c g}
- Leucochrysa retusa Freitas and Penny, 2001^{i c g}
- Leucochrysa risi Esben-Petersen, 1933^{i}
- Leucochrysa riveti (Navás, 1913)^{i c g}
- Leucochrysa robusta Freitas and Penny, 2001^{i c g}
- Leucochrysa rochana (Navás, 1922)^{i c g}
- Leucochrysa rodriguezi Navás, 1913^{i c g}
- Leucochrysa rufescens (Navás, 1931)^{i c g}
- Leucochrysa salleana (Navás, 1911)^{i c g}
- Leucochrysa santini Freitas and Penny, 2001^{i c g}
- Leucochrysa scomparini Freitas and Penny, 2001^{i c g}
- Leucochrysa scurra LaCroix, 1926^{i c g}
- Leucochrysa senior (Navás, 1935)^{i c g}
- Leucochrysa serrei (Navás, 1924)^{i c g}
- Leucochrysa serrula Adams, 1979^{c g}
- Leucochrysa squamisetosa Freitas and Penny, 2001^{i c g}
- Leucochrysa stichocera Navás, 1908^{i c g}
- Leucochrysa submacula Banks, 1915^{i c g}
- Leucochrysa sulcata (Navás, 1921)^{i c g}
- Leucochrysa superior Navás, 1913^{i c g}
- Leucochrysa surinamensis (Banks, 1944)^{i c g}
- Leucochrysa tabacina Freitas and Penny, 2001^{i c g}
- Leucochrysa tarini (Navás, 1924)^{i c g}
- Leucochrysa tavaresi Navás, 1916^{i c g}
- Leucochrysa tenuis Freitas and Penny, 2001^{i c g}
- Leucochrysa theodori (Navás, 1932)^{i c g}
- Leucochrysa theodorina (Navás, 1935)^{i c g}
- Leucochrysa urucumis de Freitas, 2007^{c g}
- Leucochrysa varia (Schneider, 1851)^{i c g}
- Leucochrysa variata (Navás, 1913)^{c g}
- Leucochrysa vegana (Navás, 1925)^{c}
- Leucochrysa vieirana Navás, 1913^{c g}
- Leucochrysa vieriana Navás, 1913^{i g}
- Leucochrysa vignisi Freitas and Penny, 2001^{i c g}
- Leucochrysa vigoi Navás, 1913^{i c g}
- Leucochrysa vinesi (Navás, 1924)^{i c g}
- Leucochrysa virginiae Penny, 1998^{i c g}
- Leucochrysa vittata Freitas and Penny, 2001^{i c g}
- Leucochrysa vulnerata (Navás, 1914)^{i c g}
- Leucochrysa walkerina Navás, 1913^{i}
- Leucochrysa ypirangana (Navás, 1932)^{i c g}
- Leucochrysa zapotina Navás, 1913^{i c g}
- Leucochrysa zayasi (Alayo, 1968)^{i c g}

Data sources: i = ITIS, c = Catalogue of Life, g = GBIF, b = Bugguide.net
