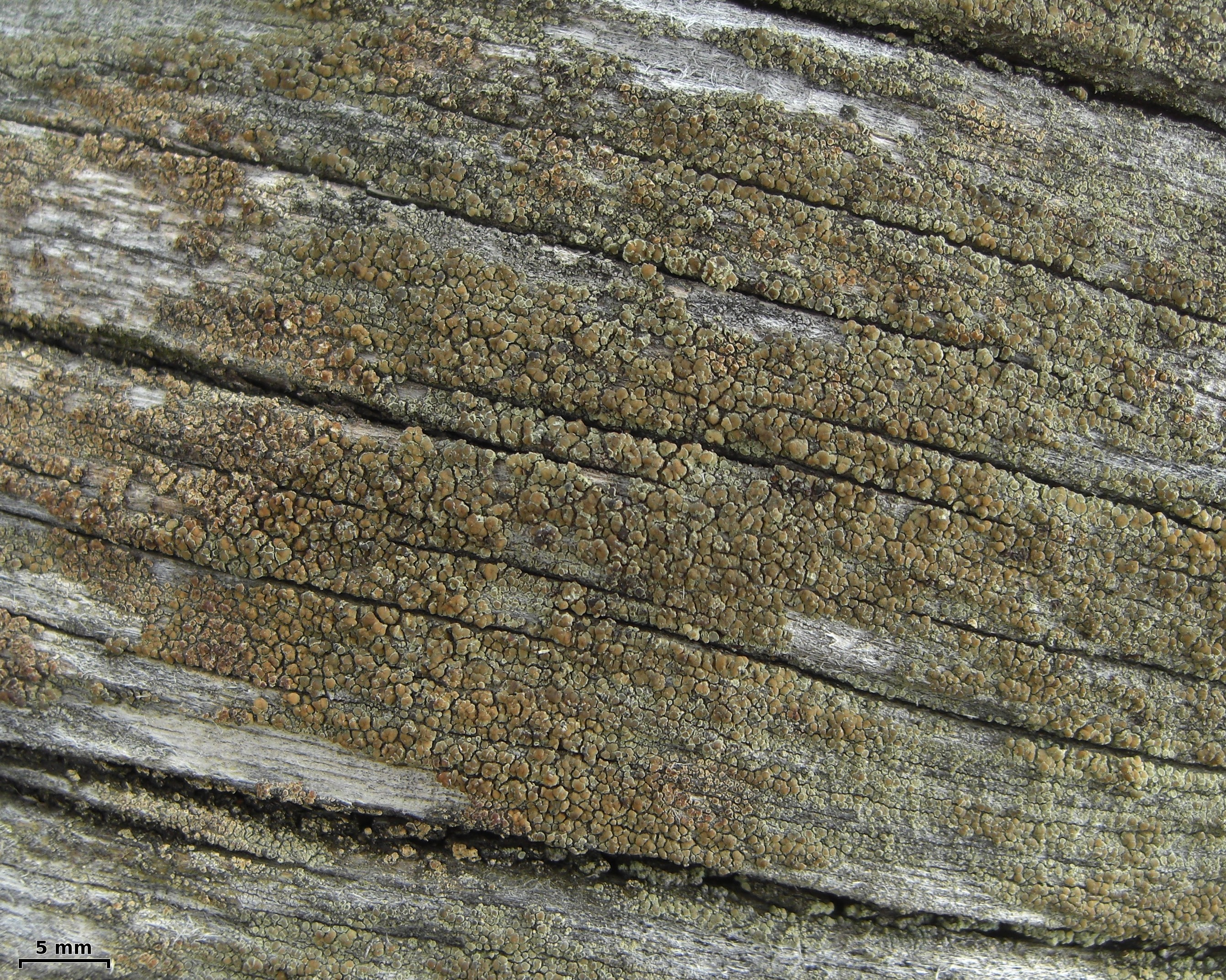

Conservation status
- Secure (NatureServe)

Scientific classification
- Kingdom: Fungi
- Division: Ascomycota
- Class: Lecanoromycetes
- Order: Lecanorales
- Family: Lecanoraceae
- Genus: Lecanora
- Species: L. albellula

Binomial name
- Lecanora albellula (Nyl.) Th.Fr. (1871)

Synonyms
- List: Lecidea albellula Nyl. (1866); Biatora albellula (Nyl.) Boistel (1903); Lecidorina albellula (Nyl.) Motyka (1996); Lecanora albella f. glaucella Flot. (1850); Lecanora hagenii var. glaucella (Flot.) Körb. (1855); Lecanora aitema var. glaucella (Flot.) Hepp (1857); Lecanora piniperda var. glaucella (Flot.) Körb. (1859); Lecanora aitema f. glaucella (Flot.) Anzi (1860); Lecanora varia var. glaucella (Flot.) Rabenh. (1867); Lecanora effusa f. glaucella (Flot.) Stein (1879); Lecanora piniperda f. glaucella (Flot.) Arnold (1881); Lecanora subintricata var. glaucella (Flot.) Vain. (1881); Lecanora glaucella (Flot.) Nyl. (1891); Lecanora piniperda subsp. glaucella (Flot.) Cromb. (1894); Lecidora glaucella (Flot.) Motyka (1996); Lecanora piniperda Körb. (1859); Lecanora albella var. piniperda (Körb.) Boistel (1896); Lecanora symmicta var. piniperda (Körb.) Boistel (1903); Lecanora albellula var. macroconidiata M.Brand & van den Boom (2008)

= Lecanora albellula =

Species of lichen

Lecanora albellula is a species of crustose lichen in the family Lecanoraceae. It grows tightly attached to the bark and wood of trees in both coniferous and mixed forests. First described in 1866 by the Finnish lichenologist William Nylander from material collected in Russian Lapland, it is widely distributed across Asia, Europe, and North America. The species is easily recognised by its pale, finely granular thallus—which can appear somewhat wart-like—and its small, round, light brick-coloured apothecia. Its name, referring to its whitish appearance, is based on traditional morphological observations used to distinguish it from similar species.

Research has refined the understanding of L. albellula through both modern genetic studies and detailed chemical analyses. These studies have clarified its placement within a well-defined clade of related lichens and revealed that some North American specimens previously identified as this species actually represent a closely related taxon, provisionally known as "Lecanora sp. D". Lecanora albellula produces characteristic secondary metabolites, notably isousnic acid, which, together with its distinctive anatomical and reproductive features, aids in distinguishing it from its congeners. Its occurrence on various tree barks and wood, particularly in temperate to subalpine regions, highlights its specific ecological requirements and the ongoing need for careful taxonomic verification.

== Taxonomy ==
Lecanora albellula was first described by the Finnish lichenologist William Nylander in 1866, based on specimens collected near Kantalahti in Russian Lapland. Nylander's original description highlighted its whitish, minutely granular thallus over a thin greyish-black hypothallus, and its small (0.5 mm wide), pale brick-coloured fruiting bodies (apothecia). He initially placed it in the genus Lecidea, though he noted it might better belong in Lecanora due to the structure of its young apothecia, which showed a thalline margin characteristic of Lecanora species. This taxonomic insight proved prescient, as the species is now firmly established within the genus Lecanora. The specific epithet albellula refers to its whitish appearance. The species has a complex taxonomic history, particularly regarding its relationship with Lecanora piniperda Körb., a name that was long used for this species but was later found to be illegitimate under botanical nomenclature rules.

Molecular phylogenetic studies have shown that L. albellula belongs to a "core clade" within the broader Lecanora saligna group, closely related to L. subsaligna and L. saligna. This core clade is characterised by the production of isousnic acid as a major metabolite and the presence of crescent-shaped macroconidia. Molecular evidence indicates that North American specimens previously identified as L. albellula actually represent a different species, provisionally named "Lecanora sp. D".

The species belongs to the diverse lichen genus Lecanora and is part of a group characterised by a corticate amphithecium (the outer layer of the fruiting body). Within the broader Lecanora genus, L. albellula belongs to a subgroup that contains both usnic and isousnic acids, distinguishing it from the Lecanora subfusca group that contains different chemical compounds. This chemical composition, along with anatomical features, helps define its taxonomic position.

Morphologically and anatomically, L. albellula shows close relationships to several other Lecanora species, particularly L. saligna and L. subintricata. However, it can be distinguished from these relatives by its specific combination of characteristics, including spore size, hymenium height, and chemical composition. The species demonstrates some anatomical variability, which led to historical confusion about its taxonomic placement. For instance, the variable structure of its apothecial margin prompted some researchers, like Józef Motyka, to propose placing it in a separate genus (Lecidorina), though this classification was not widely accepted.

The traditional Lecanora saligna group, which includes L. albellula, has been found to be paraphyletic based on molecular evidence, with the L. varia group nested within it. While the exact phylogenetic relationships within this complex remain incompletely resolved, the presence of specific morphological and chemical characters helps define natural groupings within the broader assemblage.

Recent studies have proposed segregating L. albellula into Lecanoropsis (a genus proposed by Maurice Choisy in 1949, with Lecanoropsis saligna as the type species), reflecting its distinct morphological and reproductive features. Additionally, L. albellula var. macroconidiata is distinguished by larger, 1–3-septate macroconidia measuring 12.5–14 by 1.8–2.3 μm, based on a historical collection from Middlesex.

The German-language common name for the species, Kiefern-Kuchenflechte, translates to "pine cake lichen".

== Description ==
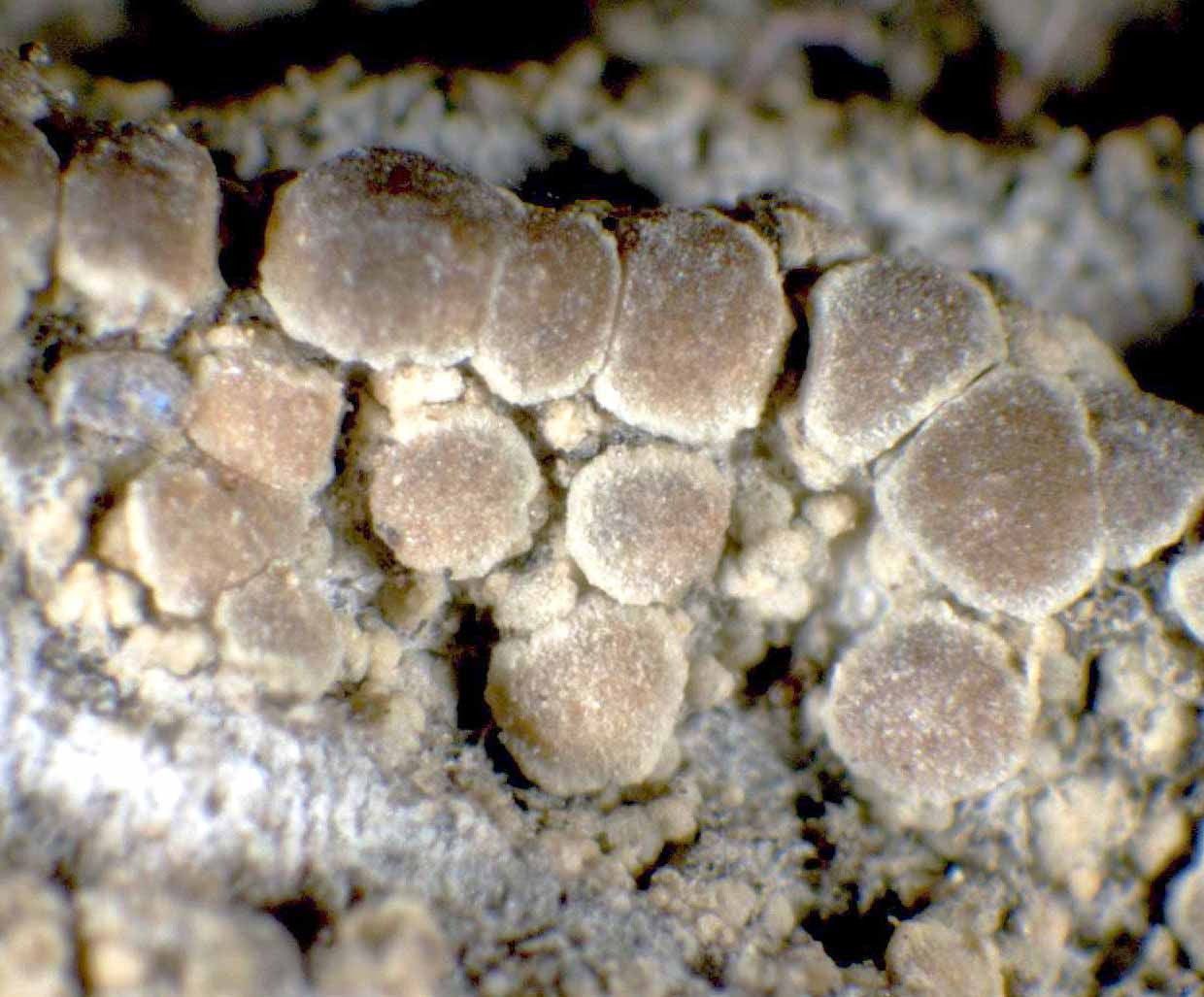
Close-up of Lecanora albellula apothecia, showing the pale, finely pruinose discs and the rounded, warty thallus areoles characteristic of the species

Lecanora albellula is a crustose lichen, meaning it grows tightly against its surface like a crust. Its main body (thallus) consists of small, scattered warty bumps or forms a continuous warty-cracked surface. These rounded wart-like areoles measure 0.05–0.15 mm across, range from moderately to strongly convex, and vary in colour from yellowish-green to ochre or greyish-beige. Sometimes, a greyish-white foundation layer (hypothallus) can be seen around individual thalli. The thallus can reach up to 4 cm in width and ranges from 50 to 600 μm in thickness. The surface is matt or slightly shiny. The photobiont (algal) cells within the thallus are chlorococcoid and measure 8–20 μm in diameter. The thallus of L. albellula is often inconspicuous, consisting of scattered granules or being immersed in bark, making it difficult to distinguish in the field.

The reproductive structures (apothecia) are round to irregular in shape and usually appear in dense clusters, though they occasionally grow alone or in small groups. They attach to the surface with a constricted base and measure 0.35–0.40 mm across on average, reaching up to 0.6–0.9 mm. The disc of each apothecium is light ochre to reddish-brown in colour, with a matt appearance and a fine whitish pruina. The disc is flat to moderately convex, rarely strongly convex. Each apothecium has a rim (margin) that is initially slightly raised but becomes level with the disc or disappears in older specimens. This margin is yellowish-beige to ochre (matching the colour of the thallus warts when present) and has a matt appearance, often with an irregular or knobby texture. The thalline margin (outer layer of the apothecium) has a cortex that is best developed in its lower part, measuring 10–30 μm thick.

Examined microscopically, the spores (ascospores) are colourless and simple (without internal divisions), measuring 8.7–10.8 μm long and 4.1–4.8 μm wide. The hymenium (spore-producing layer) is hyaline with occasional orange-brown granules and measures 35–55 μm in height. The paraphyses (sterile filaments between the spore-producing cells) are simple to sometimes branched or anastomosing, measuring 1.5–2 μm wide, with tips occasionally widening to 4–5 μm.

Unlike some closely related species, Lecanora albellula produces four distinct types of conidia, which are microscopic asexual spores involved in reproduction. These include crescent-shaped macroconidia (often present), 7–10 (sometimes up to 14) × 1–2 μm, 1–3-septate, curved; microconidia (frequent), 5.5–10 × 0.8–1.3 μm, slender and slightly curved; mesoconidia (rare), 3–5 × 1.5–2 μm, ellipsoidal; and leptoconidia (rare), 20–25 × 0.7–1 μm, curved.

Lecanora albellula demonstrates some variability in its anatomical structure, particularly in the organisation of the tissue layers in its apothecia. In older specimens, the margin may become less distinct, giving the apothecia a biatorine (lecideine) appearance, though they retain their underlying lecanorine structure when examined microscopically. These morphological features help distinguish European specimens of L. albellula from the superficially similar North American taxon now known as "Lecanora sp. D", which tends to have slightly larger apothecial discs, a higher hymenium, and somewhat different amphithecial cortex development.

=== Similar species ===
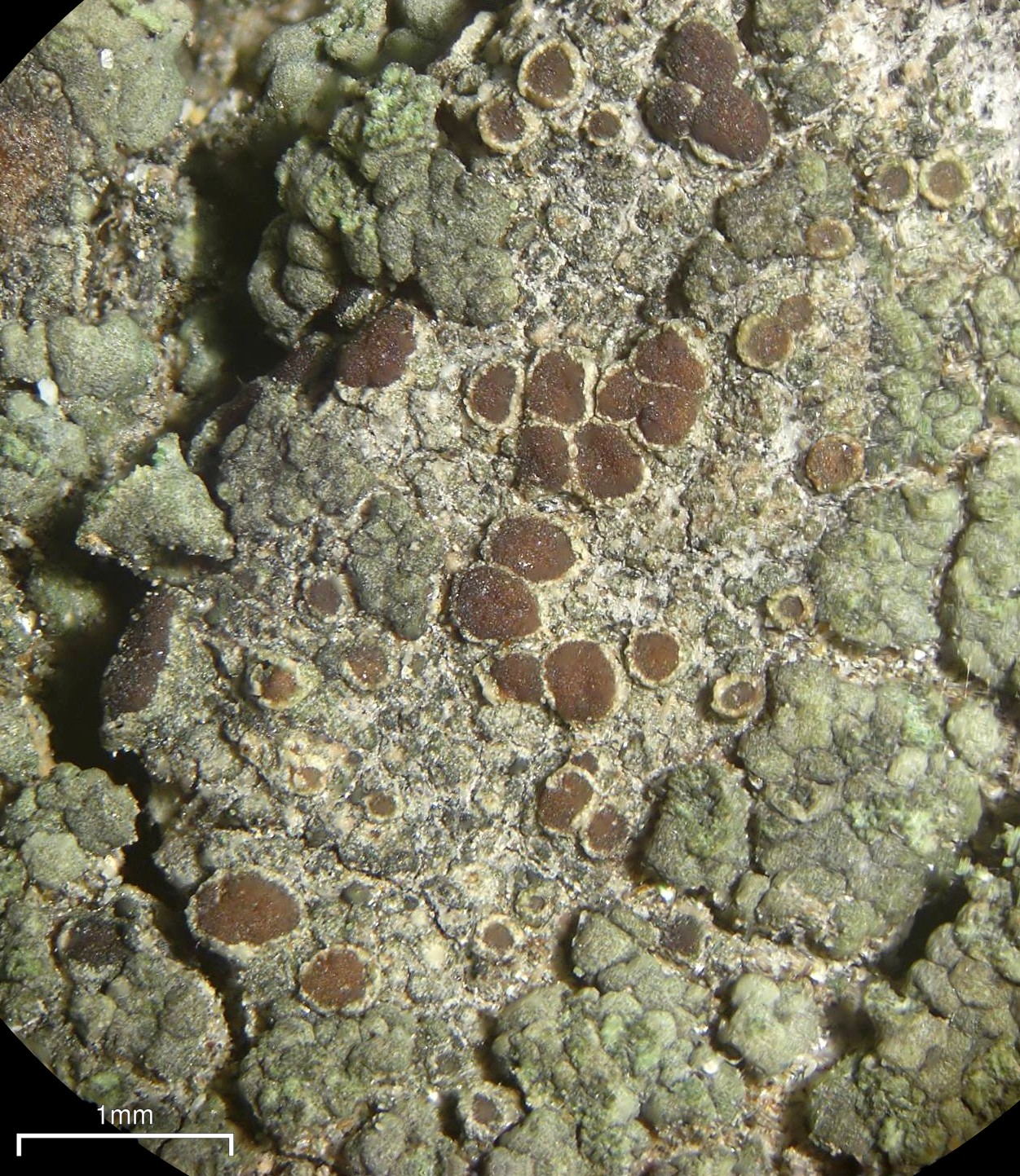
Close-up of Lecanora saligna apothecia and thallus, showing the brown discs with a thin, pale margin and the rough, greenish thallus surface characteristic of the species, aiding in distinguishing it from L. albellula.

Within the Lecanora saligna group, Lecanora sarcopidoides is often mistaken with L. albellula due to their similar morphology and overlapping distribution. However, L. sarcopidoides can be distinguished by its more prominently pruinose apothecia, which often appear eroded or irregularly notched at the edges, whereas L. albellula typically has weakly pruinose to non-pruinose apothecia with a smoother, more uniform margin. Chemically, L. sarcopidoides contains pseudoplacodiolic acid, while L. albellula primarily produces isousnic acid. This distinction is critical, as historical herbarium specimens labeled as L. albellula were frequently found to belong to L. sarcopidoides upon re-examination using thin-layer chromatography. The two species also differ in conidial morphology: L. albellula produces four distinct types of conidia, including crescent-shaped macroconidia, whereas L. sarcopidoides lacks macroconidia entirely. Recent surveys suggest that L. sarcopidoides may be more common in certain habitats, particularly on deadwood of Picea abies in Bavarian forests, raising the possibility that some records of L. albellula in Europe were misidentifications.

Several European species in the Lecanora varia group resemble L. albellula but can be distinguished by their morphological, chemical, and ecological characteristics. Lecanora burgaziae, described from central Spain, is similar in appearance but has a greenish, often endosubstratal thallus, apothecial discs lacking pruina, and contains psoromic acid in addition to usnic acid. Lecanora densa, another lookalike, differs with its beige to orange-brown, pruinose apothecial discs and a warted-areolate thallus, while Lecanora varia has a prominent, two-layered apothecial margin and contains only psoromic acid. Additionally, Lecanora coniferarum can be confused with L. albellula, but it has a basally thickened amphithecial cortex, reddish-brown apothecial discs, and a narrower spore width. Lecanora coppinsii, a related species found in Scotland, differs from L. albellula by its smaller ascospores (6–8.5 by 2.5–3.5 μm), shorter microconidia (4.5–5.5 by ~1 μm), lack of macroconidia, and a less well-developed thalline margin.

=== Chemistry ===
Chemical spot tests for L. albellula show no reaction with C, KC, or Pd reagents, while K produces a weak yellow reaction. The thallus contains isousnic acid as the primary metabolite, with usnic acid occasionally present in minor amounts. Traces of 7-O-methylnorascomatic acid occur rarely, and only in the apothecia. In acetone extracts, isousnic acid appears as weakly gelatinous with broadened, clustered granules to spiny globules, which appear weakly yellowish under normal light and do not fluoresce under UV light. When treated with iron(III) chloride, the extract produces a red-brown reaction.

== Habitat and distribution ==
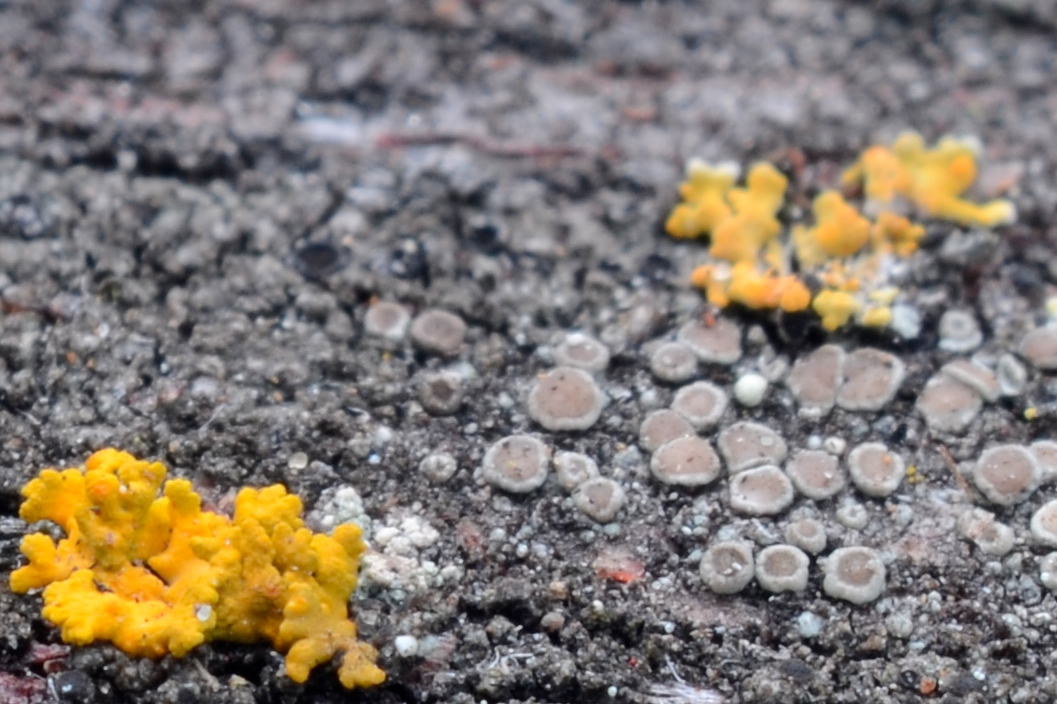
Apothecia of Lecanora albellula (centre) growing on bark, alongside a yellow-orange fruticose lichen and a smaller whitish crustose lichen

Lecanora albellula is found in coniferous and mixed coniferous forests, where it grows primarily on bark and wood. In the Sonoran Desert region of North America, it occurs at elevations between 1,950 and 3,500 m (6,400 and 11,480 ft). Within this region, the species shows different habitat preferences in different areas. In California and Baja California, it grows on Abies concolor (white fir), conifer logs, and dead pine trees (snags). In the eastern part of its range (Arizona, Colorado, and Utah), it can be found on a wider variety of coniferous trees, including Abies concolor, Abies lasiocarpa (subalpine fir), Picea engelmannii (Engelmann spruce), various species of Pinus (pine trees), and Pseudotsuga menziesii (Douglas fir). Its North American range extends north to Alaska.

While molecular studies have revealed that many specimens previously identified as L. albellula from North America represent a different species (provisionally known as "Lecanora sp. D"), true L. albellula does occur in North America alongside this similar species. The lichen shows a strong preference for temperate to subalpine climatic conditions in both continents. In Europe, it is particularly well-documented in mixed montane forests of Picea and Fagus above 900 m (3,000 ft) elevation, where it grows on both bark and wood. Historical herbarium studies have suggested that records of L. albellula in Europe—particularly in Germany—may have been partially misidentified, with some specimens actually belonging to L. sarcopidoides. Thin-layer chromatography has revealed that a number of German specimens labeled as L. albellula contained pseudoplacodiolic acid instead of isousnic acid, indicating they were incorrectly classified.

The species has a broad distribution across Europe, ranging from northern Scandinavia to northern Spain, with specimens also documented in Cyprus. It grows on the bark of various tree species including Acer, Corylus, Fagus, Larix, Picea, Pinus, Salix and Sambucus, as well as on decorticated trunks and occasionally on wood and timber. In northern European production forests—particularly in Sweden—L. albellula is commonly found on Scots pine monoculture stands. It is among the dominant species at forest edges in the Khentii Mountains and the Altai Mountains of both Mongolia and Kazakhstan. Recent surveys indicate that L. sarcopidoides is more widespread than previously thought, particularly on deadwood of Picea abies in Bavarian forests, suggesting that some past reports of L. albellula from Germany may need reassessment. These findings highlight the need for further verification of historical collections to clarify the true distribution of L. albellula.

The consistent association with coniferous substrates and its occurrence at higher elevations suggests that L. albellula has specific ecological requirements, particularly regarding altitude, substrate chemistry, and forest habitat type. This habitat specificity may be related to its need for particular moisture levels, light conditions, or bark chemistry found in these environments.

== See also ==
- List of Lecanora species
