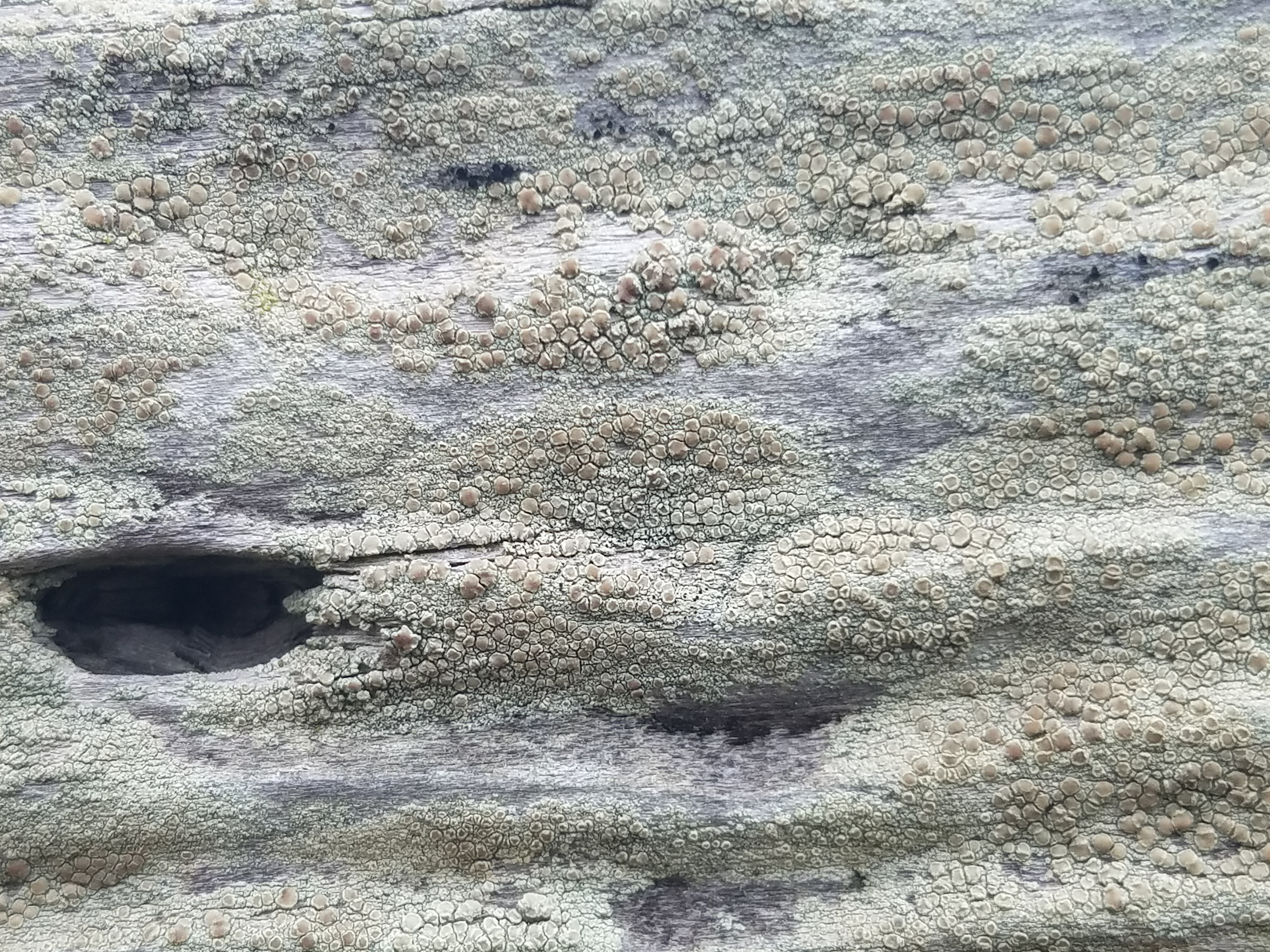
- Zeora confusa

Scientific classification
- Kingdom: Fungi
- Division: Ascomycota
- Class: Lecanoromycetes
- Order: Lecanorales
- Family: Lecanoraceae
- Genus: Zeora; Fr. (1825)

Type species
- Zeora orosthea (Ach.) Flot. (1850)

Species
- See text

= Zeora =

Genus of lichen-forming fungi

Zeora is a genus of crustose lichens in the family Lecanoraceae. Species in Zeora usually form yellowish to yellow-green crusts that may look powdery or granular, most often on bark and wood, though some also grow on rock. Many specimens are sterile, so they are often encountered as spreading patches without obvious fruiting bodies. The genus is almost cosmopolitan, and DNA-based studies have supported reviving Zeora for a distinct group of species once placed in Lecanora that also share similar secondary metabolites (lichen products), commonly including usnic acid and zeorin.

== Taxonomy ==
The name Zeora was introduced by the Swedish mycologist Elias Magnus Fries in 1825, and it was among the earliest generic segregates recognized from the broad, traditional concept of Lecanora. In the protologue he characterised it by apothecia with an exposed, waxy disc that is at first covered by the thallus but later surrounded by a powdery thalline margin that gradually fades away, and by a thallus spreading outward from the centre as a wholly leprose (powdery) crust, reported from dry, shaded microhabitats such as sheltered rock faces and shaded bark crevices (often on north-facing surfaces). Over the 19th and early 20th centuries, the name was applied in various ways: for example, Julius von Flotow used Zeora broadly for crustose lichens with lecanorine apothecia (fruiting bodies with a thallus-derived rim), while later authors discussed "zeorine" margins (a dark proper exciple visible within a thalline rim), a feature that is not characteristic of the species now placed in Zeora. The type species is Lecanora orosthea (now Zeora orosthea), designated by Josef Hafellner in 1984.

In a seven-locus phylogeny of Lecanora (in the loose sense, or sensu lato), Ivanovich‑Hichins and colleagues recovered Zeora as a supported genus-level clade and proposed resurrecting Zeora for the L. symmicta group, supported by a combination of phylogenetic, morphological, and chemical evidence.

A later phylogenomic analysis based on 1003 orthologous genes also placed Zeora close to (and sister to) one of the Lecanora subfusca clades, within a "core" assemblage of Lecanora sensu stricto and allied lineages. That study showed that different genes placed Zeora in different positions on the evolutionary tree, pointing to a complex evolutionary history, even though the genus is morphologically and chemically distinctive and readily identifiable.

== Description ==
Species of Zeora form thin to thick crusts on their substrates. The thallus surface is typically yellowish to yellow‑green and often granular, farinose (mealy), or sorediate (powdery, with propagules for vegetative reproduction). Fruiting bodies (apothecia) may be absent in some species; when present they are usually flat to convex, sometimes pruinose (with a whitish coating), and may darken with age. The apothecial margin can be lecanorine or biatorine and commonly becomes excluded (i.e., the rim is reduced or disappears as the disc expands).

Microscopically, Zeora lacks large amphithecial oxalate crystals; instead, small crystals and granules are often potassium hydroxide (KOH)-soluble (with Z. strobilina noted as an exception in granule solubility behaviour). Asci are of the Lecanora-type and typically eight-spored, though Z. strobilinoides can have more spores per ascus. The ascospores are hyaline and usually simple, occasionally with a single septum. Conidia are threadlike (filiform) and often curved.

Chemically, Zeora usually produces usnic acid and zeorin as major secondary metabolites. Atranorin is generally absent (reported as an exception for Z. sulphurea), and a variety of other compounds may occur in some species, sometimes only in trace amounts. In comparisons made by the authors, Zeora differs from Straminella in having a more granular/farinose or sorediate thallus and margins that often become excluded; Straminella typically has a more consistently developed (corticate) amphithecial margin and different secondary chemistry (notably psoromic acid patterns).

== Habitat, distribution, and ecology ==
Most Zeora species occur on bark or wood (corticolous or lignicolous), although saxicolous species on siliceous rocks also occur. The genus is described as nearly cosmopolitan, with representatives on most continents but not Antarctica.

Zeora is lichenized with chlorococcoid green algae as the photobiont. Some species are frequently encountered in sterile condition (without apothecia), consistent with the common presence of sorediate or mealy thalli that can spread vegetatively.

== Species ==
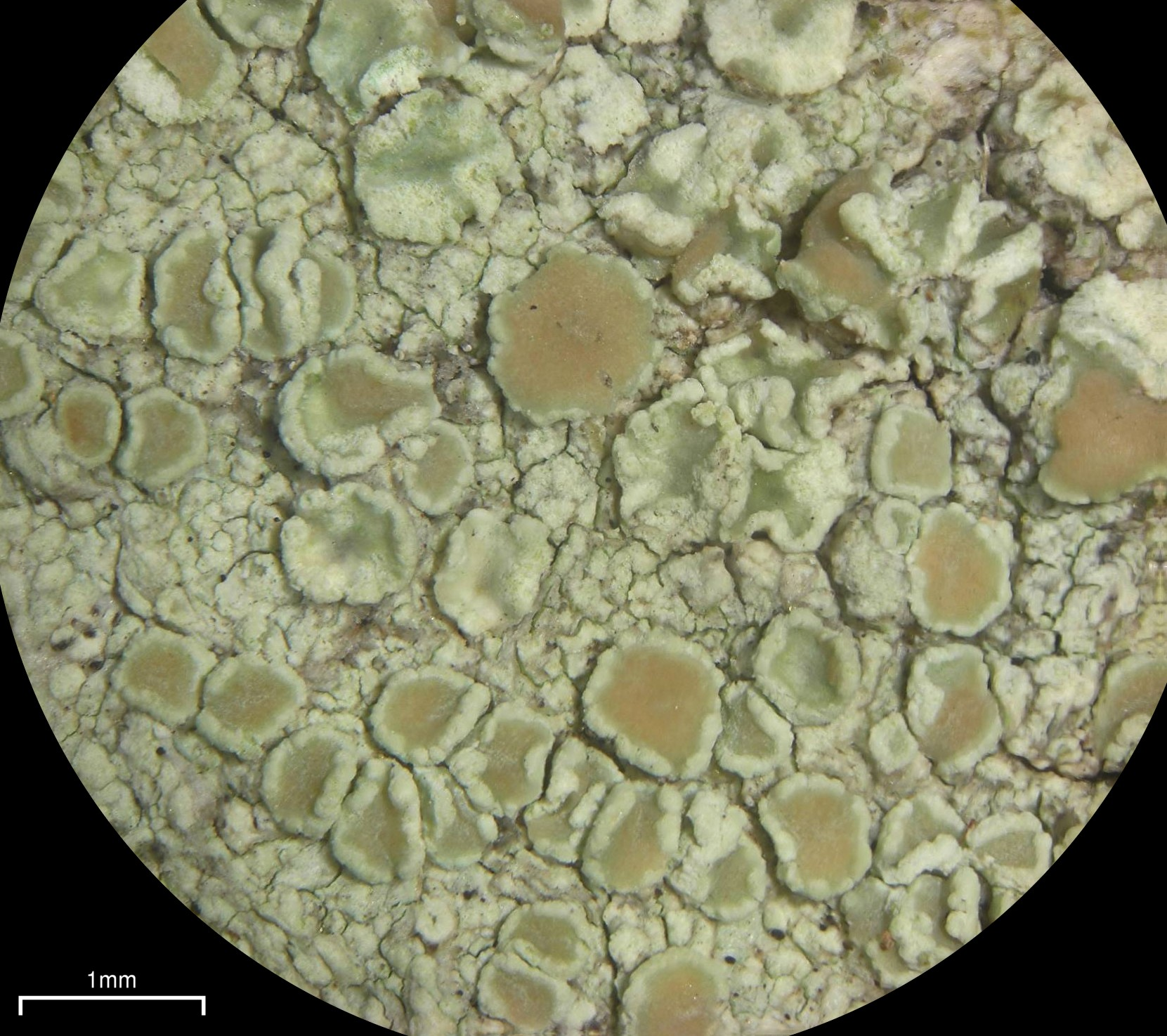
Zeora strobilina

The 2025 resurrection transferred the following species into Zeora (including the type species Z. orosthea):

- Zeora aitema (Ach.) Weber & Ivanovich (2025)
- Zeora atrosulphurea (Wahlenb.) Weber & Ivanovich (2025)
- Zeora austrocalifornica (Lendemer & K.Knudsen) L.M.Weber & Ivanovich (2025)
- Zeora compallens (Herk & Aptroot) L.M.Weber & Ivanovich (2025)
- Zeora confusa (Almb.) L.M.Weber & Ivanovich (2025)
- Zeora expallens (Ach.) L.M.Weber & Ivanovich (2025)
- Zeora flavoleprosa (Tønsberg) L.M.Weber & Ivanovich (2025)
- Zeora helmutii (Pérez-Ort. & Kantvilas) Pérez-Ort., L.M.Weber & Ivanovich (2025)
- Zeora orosthea (Ach.) Flot. (1850)
- Zeora parasymmicta (B.G.Lee & Hur) L.M.Weber & Ivanovich (2025)
- Zeora pulverulenta (Müll.Arg.) L.M.Weber & Ivanovich (2025)
- Zeora stanislai (Guzow-Krzem., Łubek, Malíček & Kukwa) L.M.Weber & Ivanovich (2025)
- Zeora straminea (Stenh.) L.M.Weber & Ivanovich (2025)
- Zeora strobilina (Spreng.) L.M.Weber & Ivanovich (2025)
- Zeora strobilinoides (Giralt & Gómez-Bolea) L.M.Weber & Ivanovich (2025)
- Zeora sulphurea (Hoffm.) Flot. (1850)
- Zeora symmicta (Ach.) L.M.Weber & Ivanovich (2025)

The authors noted that Z. symmicta may represent a species complex, and they suggested that future work could use molecular data to refine its circumscription.

They also listed several additional Lecanora species as likely members of Zeora pending DNA data (and therefore not formally transferred in that work), including Lecanora americana, L. brucei, L. confusoides, L. conizella, L. cupressi, L. fluoroxylina, L. orae-frigidae, L. perconfusa, L. sabinae, L. simeonensis, L. subaureoides, L. substrobilina, L. subtecta, and L. terpenoidea.
