= Straminella printzenii =

Scientific classification
- Kingdom: Fungi
- Division: Ascomycota
- Class: Lecanoromycetes
- Order: Lecanorales
- Family: Lecanoraceae
- Genus: Straminella
- Species: S. printzenii

Binomial name
- Straminella printzenii (Pérez-Ort., M.Vivas & Hafellner) Pérez-Ort. & Ivanovich-Hichins (2025)

Synonyms
- Lecanora printzenii Pérez-Ort., M.Vivas & Hafellner (2011)

Species of lichen-forming fungus

Straminella printzenii is a species of crustose lichen in the family Lecanoraceae. It was described from Spain in 2011 and is a lichenicolous species that grows on other lichens, especially Umbilicaria. Recent phylogenetic work resurrected the genus Straminella for the former Lecanora varia group and transferred this species to it.

== Taxonomy ==
The species was first described in 2011 as Lecanora printzenii by Sergio Pérez-Ortega, Mercedes Vivas Rebuelta, and Josef Hafellner. The epithet honours lichenologist Christian Printzen of Frankfurt, Germany, in recognition of his work on the taxonomy of yellow Lecanora species.

Straminella printzenii belongs to the Lecanora varia species group (now treated as Straminella), whose taxonomy has been revised in several studies. DNA sequencing and molecular phylogenetic analyses show that it is closely related to other members of this group, such as S. varia, S. burgaziae, and S. densa. The type specimen was collected in August 2007 in the Parque natural de las Lagunas Glaciares de Neila (Castilla and León, Spain). Paratype material was distributed in the seventh fascicle of the exsiccata series "Lichenicolous Biota" (no. 176), on an unspecified species of Umbilicaria.

In 2025, a seven-locus phylogenetic study of Lecanora sensu lato resurrected Straminella for the former Lecanora varia group and made the new combination Straminella printzenii for this species.

== Description ==
Straminella printzenii is characterised by its yellowish-green thallus composed of convex, irregularly rounded areoles, and its numerous apothecia, which can be either regular in shape or compressed and irregular. Young apothecia are sessile with thick margins that transition from greenish to black, and they feature a narrow yet distinct whitish band on the inner side. Initially rounded, the apothecia become flexuose as they mature, and they become constricted at the base and cup-shaped. Older apothecia are flat, narrowly attached, and have a much thinner margin. The apothecial discs transition from yellowish-green to melanized and can range from bare to somewhat pruinose. This melanization of both the apothecial margin and the disc helps to differentiate it from its close relatives. The photobiont partner is a green alga in the genus Trebouxia, with cells up to 20 μm in diameter. Microscopically, the asci are Lecanora-type with simple, colourless ascospores, and the conidia are slender and curved.

The lichen produces usnic acid and psoromic acid as the main secondary metabolites.

In the genus Straminella, the thallus is typically greenish yellow to beige and usually lacks soredia, and the apothecia are often abundant. In S. printzenii, the apothecial disc and parts of the margin often become strongly darkened (blackish) in older apothecia.

== Similar species ==
Straminella printzenii belongs to the Straminella (Lecanora varia) species group and is closely related to other members of the group such as S. varia, S. burgaziae, and S. densa. However, it is distinguished from these relatives by its lichenicolous habit, a partly melanized excipulum, the blackish disc, and its distinct ITS sequence. Other lichenicolous species of Lecanora, such as L. lasalliae on Lasallia pustulata and L. gyrophorina on Umbilicaria hyperborea, are outside the Straminella (Lecanora varia) group and differ in host range, anatomy and chemistry.

== Habitat and distribution ==
Straminella printzenii is a lichenicolous lichen found mainly on species of Umbilicaria; a Polish collection was made on Psorinia conglomerata. It can cause significant damage to the areas of the host where it grows.

The species has been recorded from mountainous regions across Europe including Sierra de Francia (Spain), the Alps (Austria), the Carpathians (Poland), and most recently Montenegro on the Balkan Peninsula. That record extends the known distribution of S. printzenii, which is expected to be wider.
