= Zeora compallens =

Scientific classification
- Kingdom: Fungi
- Division: Ascomycota
- Class: Lecanoromycetes
- Order: Lecanorales
- Family: Lecanoraceae
- Genus: Zeora
- Species: Z. compallens

Binomial name
- Zeora compallens (Herk & Aptroot) L.M.Weber & Ivanovich-Hichins (2025)

Synonyms
- Lecanora compallens Herk & Aptroot (1999)

Species of lichen

Zeora compallens is a species of corticolous (bark-dwelling) crustose lichen in the family Lecanoraceae. It is usually found on the bark of roadside and other open-grown trees, where it often develops as a sterile, powdery crust. The species can be recognised in the field by its grey-green, warty surface and the yellowish to pale green soredia that spread across much of the thallus. It has been recorded from western and central Europe and is also known from parts of eastern Europe and western Asia.

== Taxonomy ==
It was formally described as a new species in 1999 by lichenologists Kok van Herk and André Aptroot. The type specimen was collected by the first author from Drouwenerveen (Drenthe), where it was found growing on the bark of Quercus robur. The species epithet compallens is derived from the Latin com ("together with") and (ex)pallens, alluding to the typical occurrence of the morphologically similar Zeora expallens at the same location.

In a later molecular re-assessment of Lecanora (in the loose sense, or sensu lato) using a multi-locus dataset, Ivanovich-Hichins and co-authors recovered several well-supported clades that they treated at genus rank, including a resurrected Zeora corresponding to the Lecanora symmicta group. Within that framework, Lecanora compallens was recombined as Zeora compallens.

== Description ==
The thallus of Zeora compallens is typically 1 to 3 cm (0.4 to 1.2 in) (sometimes up to 5 cm) with a whitish grey margin. It is covered with dull greyish-green warts measuring 0.1–0.2 mm in diameter. Soralia start out as point-like openings (0.1–0.3 mm in diameter) that eventually rise up and coalesce into irregular patches that ultimately cover most of the thallus, except for a 1-mm wide margin. The soredia are granular, and form a dense, yellowish to slightly mint green mass about 15–30 μm in diameter and forming a layer of up to 0.4 mm thick. No apothecia have been documented for the species, which is consistent with several species in Zeora that are known mainly or only from sterile material.

Zeorin and usnic acid are lichen products found in Zeora compallens. The expected results of chemical spot tests are C−, PD−, K−, UV− in the thallus, and C−, PD−, K+ (yellowish to yellowish brown), and UV− in the soredia. The combination of usnic acid and zeorin matches the typical chemistry reported for Zeora in its current circumscription.

== Habitat and distribution ==
Zeora compallens usually grows on the west-facing side of wayside trees, on both acidic bark and neutral bark. It is often found on pedunculate oak, but has also been recorded on ash, poplar, willow, Sorbus, linden, elm, and elder. Other lichens that commonly co-occur include Buellia griseovirens, Lecanora chlarotera, Pyrrhospora quernea, and Zeora expallens; the latter species, however, usually occurs on the sheltered east side of trees. Zeora compallens has been verified to occur in Belgium, Germany, Luxembourg, the Netherlands, Great Britain, Poland, Belarus, Russia, and Turkey.
