= Lecanorine lichen =

Type of fruiting part of lichen

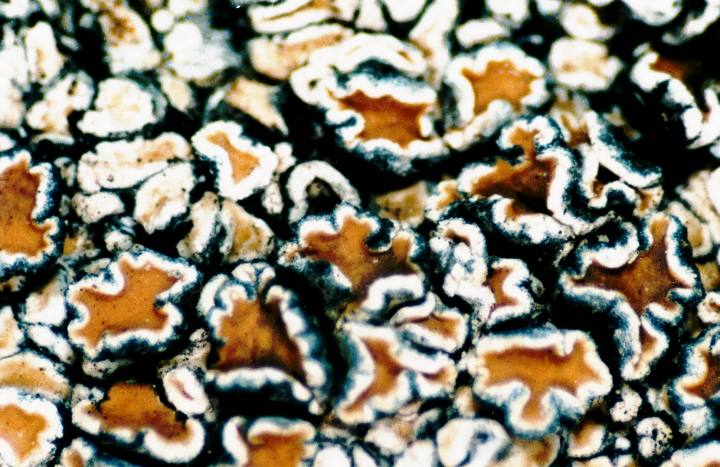
The scrunched up apothecia discs of Lecanora muralis have rims that are made of tissue similar to the underlying body, so are said to be lecanorine.

A lichen has lecanorine fruiting body parts if they are shaped like a plate with a ring around them, and that ring is made of tissue similar to the main non-fruiting body part of the lichen. The name comes from the name of the lichen genus Lecanora, whose members have such apothecia. If a lichen has lecanorine apothecia, the lichen itself is sometimes described as being lecanorine.
