= Zeora helmutii =

Scientific classification
- Kingdom: Fungi
- Division: Ascomycota
- Class: Lecanoromycetes
- Order: Lecanorales
- Family: Lecanoraceae
- Genus: Zeora
- Species: Z. helmutii

Binomial name
- Zeora helmutii (Pérez-Ort. & Kantvilas) Pérez-Ort., L.M.Weber & Ivanovich-Hichins

Synonyms
- Lecanora helmutii Pérez-Ort. & Kantvilas (2018)

Species of lichen

Zeora helmutii is a rare species of corticolous (bark-dwelling) crustose lichen in the family Lecanoraceae. It is known only from the type collection in Tasmania, where it grows on the bark of Banksia marginata in coastal swampy woodland. The species was described in 2018 as Lecanora helmutii, and was later transferred to Zeora when that genus was resurrected for the former Lecanora symmicta group.

Characteristics of the lichen, including biatorine apothecia (with a proper margin only, lacking a thalline margin), Lecanora-type asci and simple, translucent ascospores, place it in Zeora—a genus that corresponds to the former Lecanora symmicta species group. It contains usnic acid and zeorin as lichen products; all standard chemical spot tests on the thallus are negative.

== Taxonomy ==
The species was described in 2018 by Sergio Pérez-Ortega and Gintaras Kantvilas as Lecanora helmutii, based on material from Tasmania. The type specimen was collected from the eastern side of Stanley Highway, where it was found growing on the bark of Banksia marginata in a coastal swampy woodland dominated by Melaleuca. It is only known from the type collection. The epithet honours Austrian lichenologist Helmut Mayrhofer. In a later molecular reassessment of Lecanora sensu lato, the species was recombined as Zeora helmutii when Zeora was resurrected for the former Lecanora symmicta group.

== Ecology ==
Other associated lichens at the type locality include Austroparmelina pseudorelicina, Bactropsora paludicola, Menegazzia subpertusa, Pannaria elixii, and Parmotrema perlatum.
