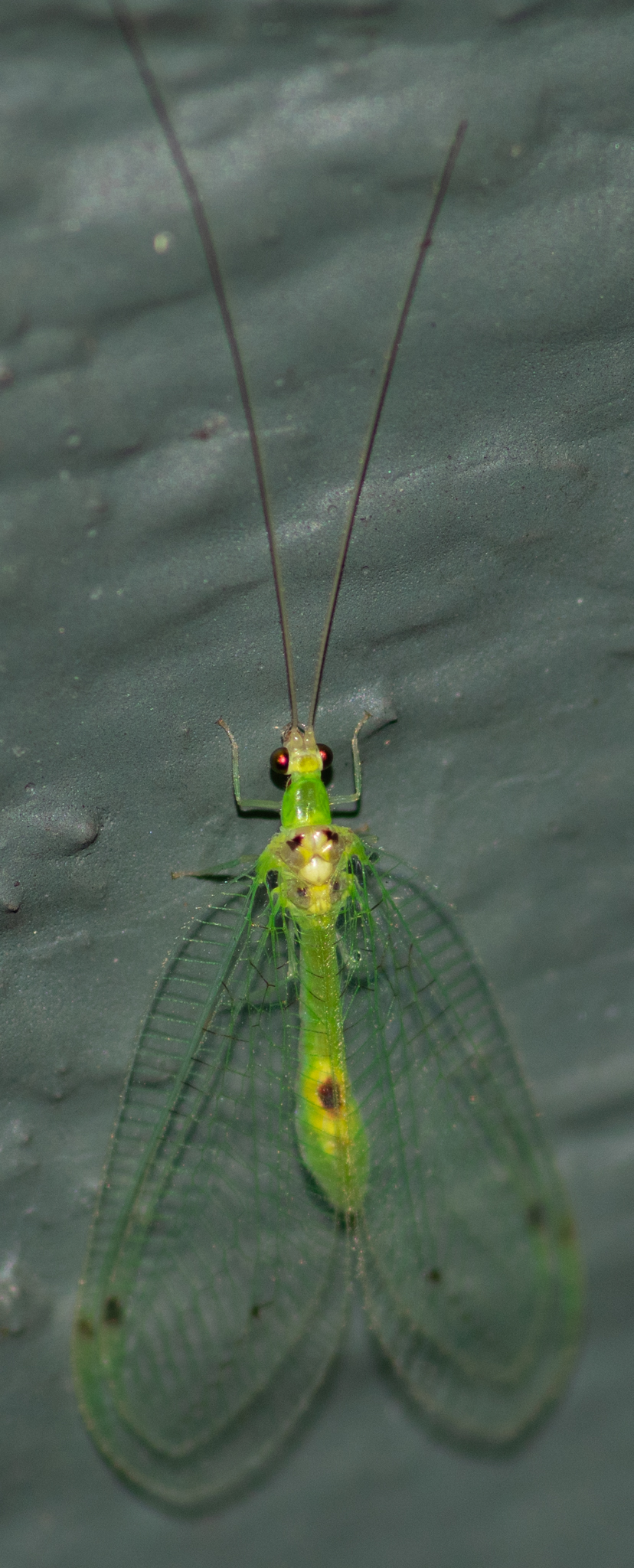

Scientific classification
- Domain: Eukaryota
- Kingdom: Animalia
- Phylum: Arthropoda
- Class: Insecta
- Order: Neuroptera
- Family: Chrysopidae
- Genus: Leucochrysa
- Species: L. insularis

Binomial name
- Leucochrysa insularis (Walker, 1853)

= Leucochrysa insularis =

Species of lacewing

Leucochrysa insularis is a species of green lacewing in the family Chrysopidae. It is found in the Caribbean Sea, Central America, and North America.
