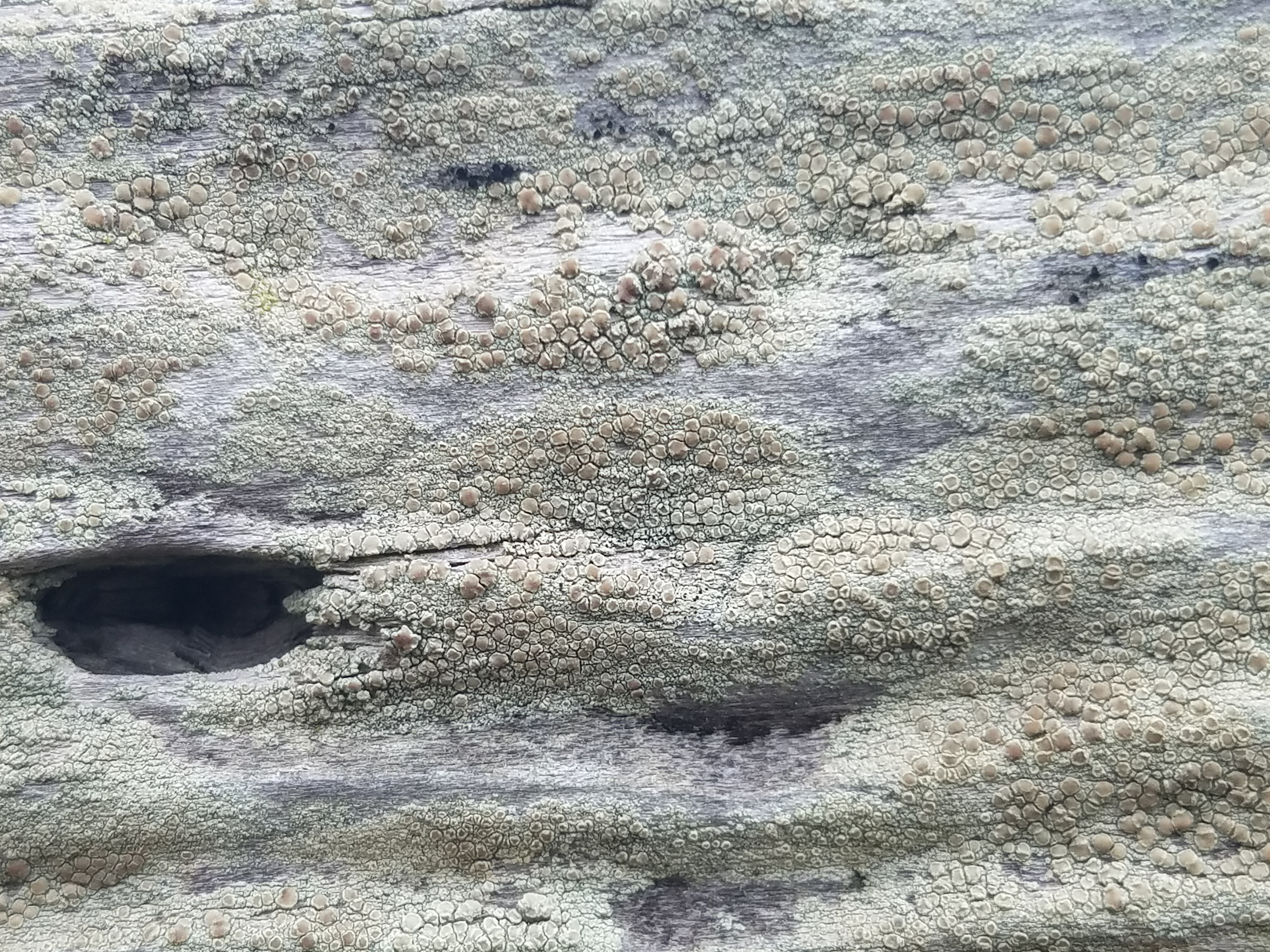

Scientific classification
- Kingdom: Fungi
- Division: Ascomycota
- Class: Lecanoromycetes
- Order: Lecanorales
- Family: Lecanoraceae
- Genus: Zeora
- Species: Z. confusa

Binomial name
- Zeora confusa (Almb.) L.M.Weber & Ivanovich-Hichins (2025)

Synonyms
- Lecanora confusa Almb. (1955)

= Zeora confusa =

Species of lichen-forming fungus

Zeora confusa is a species of corticolous (bark-dwelling) crustose lichen in the family Lecanoraceae. It was described from Sweden in 1955 as Lecanora confusa. A later molecular study of Lecanora supported resurrecting the genus Zeora for the former Lecanora symmicta group, and the species was transferred accordingly. It grows on the bark of trees and shrubs, particularly in coastal areas of Europe and North America. First identified in Sweden in 1955, this small, greenish-grey lichen forms smooth patches and is recognized by its pale yellowish-green reproductive structures (apothecia). Once thought extinct in the Netherlands, it was rediscovered in 2000 growing primarily on poplar trees.

== Taxonomy ==
It was described as new to science in 1955 by the Swedish lichenologist Ove Almborn. The type specimen was collected by Almborn himself on 26 August 1950, in Hallands Väderö, located in Torekov parish, Skåne, Sweden. The specimen was found growing on alder in an area called Kapellhamnskärret. This specimen is preserved as a lectotype in the Lund University Botanical Museum (LD) herbarium, having been formally designated as the lectotype by Arup and Ekman in 1991.

It belongs to a group of yellow-green, usnic acid-containing lichens that were long treated informally within Lecanora (the Lecanora symmicta species group) but are now placed in Zeora.

== Description ==
Zeora confusa has a granular to areolate thallus that forms small, smooth, green to yellow-grey patches. Its apothecia, usually abundant, measure 0.4–0.7 mm, and have a pale yellowish-green, flat to convex disc. Asci (spore-bearing sacs) are club-shaped (clavate) and measure 32–45 by 11–15 μm. Its ascospores have a narrow ellipsoidal shape and typically measure 10–14 by 4–5 μm. The lichen contains several lichen products: usnic acid, zeorin, thiophanic acid, arthothelin, and some other xanthone compounds. An additional, unidentified xanthone has been reported for Z. confusa.

== Habitat and distribution ==
Zeora confusa is widespread in Northern and Western Europe, with a range extending to southern Scandinavia. It also occurs in North America (including Alaska) and in Macaronesia. It grows on the bark of twigs and branches of deciduous shrubs and trees, and occasionally on timber, especially in coastal areas. Once considered extinct in the Netherlands, Z. confusa was rediscovered in 2000 at 24 localities in Zeeland province, predominantly growing on the trunks of poplar trees along roads, dikes, and forest edges. Although historically associated with twigs, these new findings were all on tree trunks in well-lit conditions. In 2024, it was reported from Paramushir in the Russian Far East, its first record from Russia.
