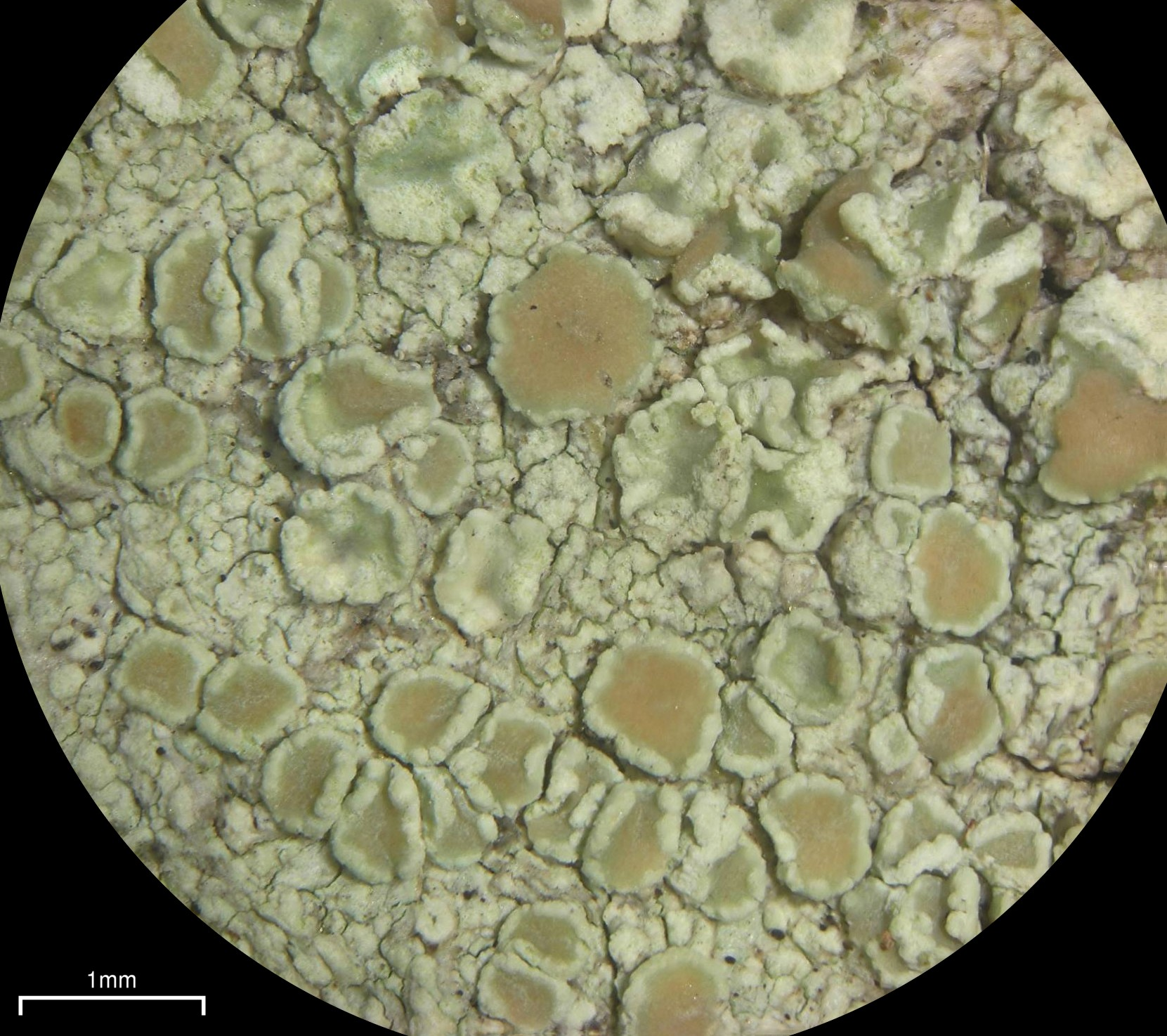

Conservation status
- Secure (NatureServe)

Scientific classification
- Kingdom: Fungi
- Division: Ascomycota
- Class: Lecanoromycetes
- Order: Lecanorales
- Family: Lecanoraceae
- Genus: Zeora
- Species: Z. strobilina

Binomial name
- Zeora strobilina (Spreng.) L.M.Weber & Ivanovich (2025)

Synonyms
- Parmelia strobilina Spreng. (1827); Lecanora varia var. strobilina (Spreng.) Th.Fr. (1871); Lecanora symmicta f. strobilina (Spreng.) H.Olivier (1884); Lecanora varia f. strobilina (Spreng.) Flagey (1884); Lecanora conizaea var. strobilina (Spreng.) Flagey (1895); Lecanora strobilina (Spreng.) Kieff. (1895); Lecanora conizaea f. strobilina (Spreng.) H.Olivier (1897)

= Zeora strobilina =

Species of lichen-forming fungus

Zeora strobilina, also known as the mealy rim lichen, is a species of crustose lichen in the family Lecanoraceae. It was originally described as Parmelia strobilina by German botanist Kurt Polycarp Joachim Sprengel in 1827. The species was long treated in Lecanora, but was later transferred to Zeora when that genus was resurrected for the former Lecanora symmicta group in 2025. It is distributed across North America and the Mediterranean region, and has also become established in South America and the Galápagos. It can be distinguished from other closely related species, including Z. confusa, by the presence of the polyphenolic compound decarboxysquamatic acid in thin-layer chromatography.
