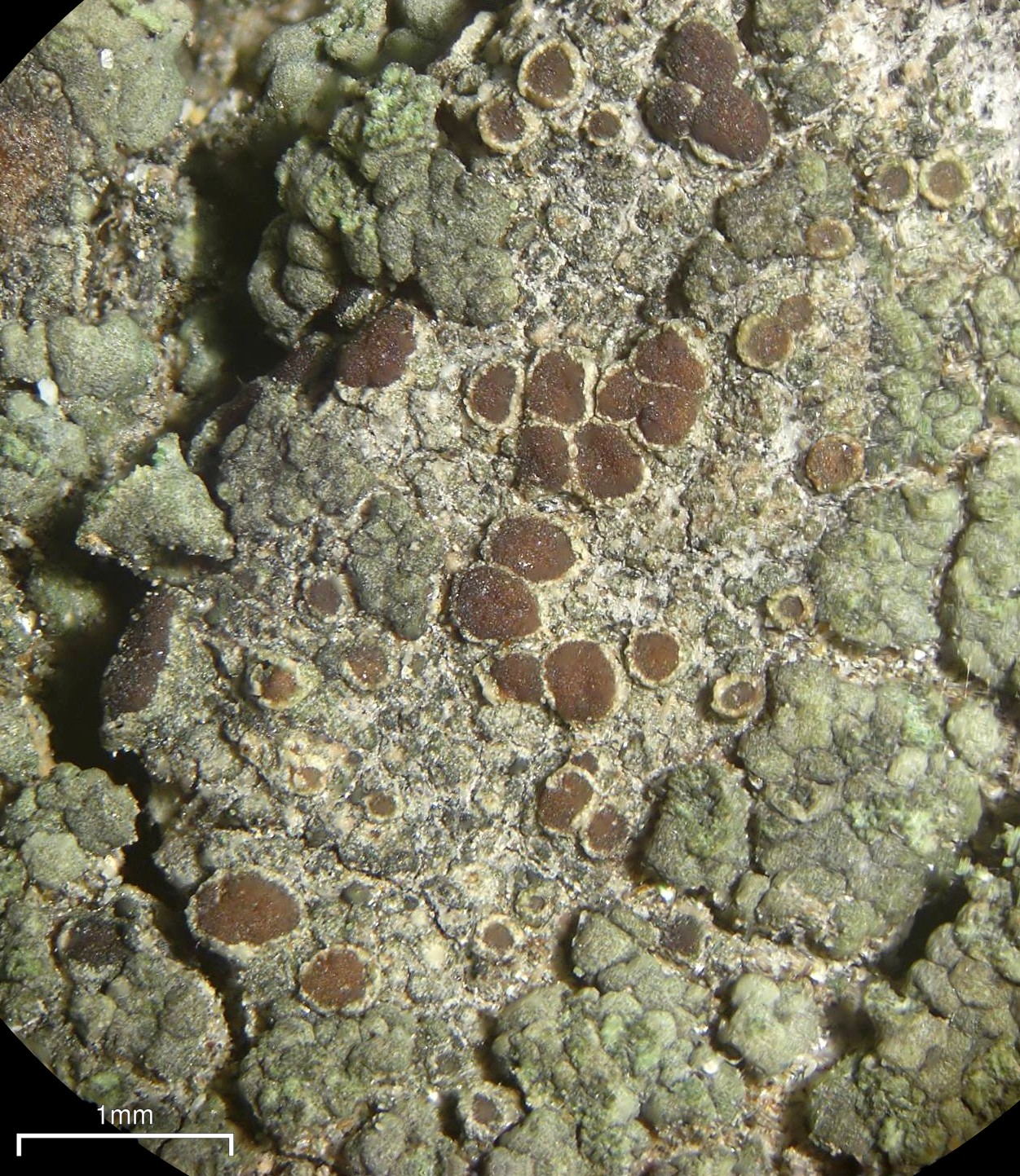

Conservation status
- Secure (NatureServe)

Scientific classification
- Kingdom: Fungi
- Division: Ascomycota
- Class: Lecanoromycetes
- Order: Lecanorales
- Family: Lecanoraceae
- Genus: Lecanora
- Species: L. saligna

Binomial name
- Lecanora saligna (Schrad.) Zahlbr. (1928)

Synonyms
- Lichen salignus Schrad. (1794); Lichen effusus Pers. (1796) [1795]; Verrucaria effusa Hoffm.(1796) [1795]; Parmelia effusa (Hoffm.) Ach. (1803); Parmelia sarcopis Wahlenb. ex Ach. (1803); Patellaria effusa (Hoffm.) DC. (1805); Lecanora effusa (Hoffm.) Ach. (1810); Lichen sarcopis (Wahlenb. ex Ach.) Wahlenb. (1812); Lecanora sarcopis (Wahlenb. ex Ach.) Ach. (1813); Rinodina effusa (Hoffm.) Gray (1821); Courtoisia effusa (Hoffm.) L.Marchand (1830); Lecanora varia var. sarcopis (Wahlenb. ex Ach.) Mudd (1861); Zeora effusa (Hoffm.) Anzi (1864); Lecanora effusa var. sarcopis (Wahlenb. ex Ach.) Th.Fr. (1871); Lecanoropsis saligna (Schrad.) M.Choisy (1949); Lecanoropsis sarcopis (Wahlenb. ex Ach.) M.Choisy (1949); Lecanora saligna var. sarcopis (Wahlenb. ex Ach.) Tomin (1956)

= Lecanora saligna =

Species of lichen

Lecanora saligna is a species of crustose lichen in the family Lecanoraceae.

== See also ==
- List of Lecanora species
