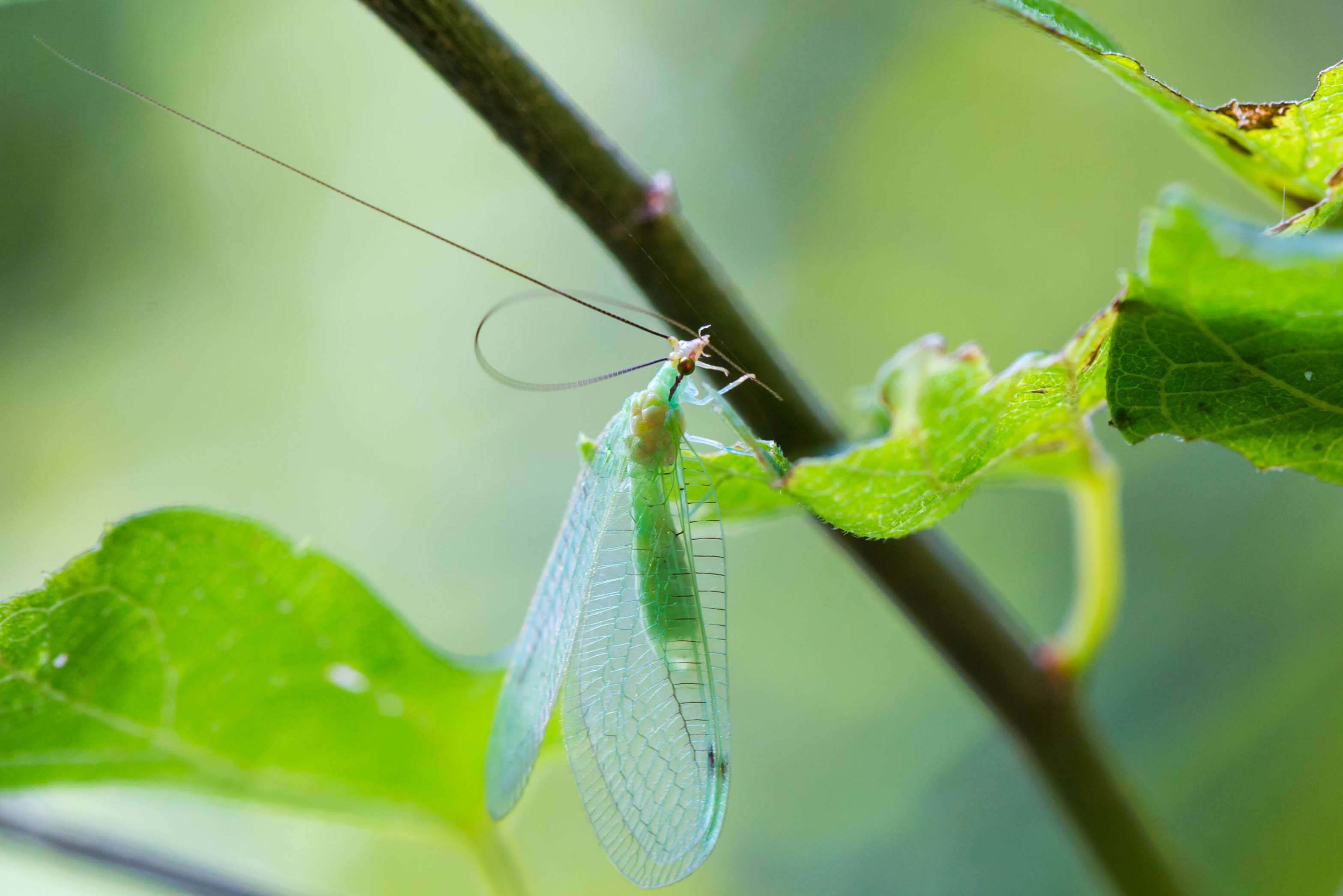
- Leucochrysa (Nodita) pavida in Tennessee

Scientific classification
- Domain: Eukaryota
- Kingdom: Animalia
- Phylum: Arthropoda
- Class: Insecta
- Order: Neuroptera
- Family: Chrysopidae
- Subfamily: Chrysopinae
- Tribe: Leucochrysini; Adams, 1978

= Leucochrysini =

Tribe of lacewings

Leucochrysini is a tribe of green lacewings in the family Chrysopidae. There are 7 genera and 213 described species in Leucochrysini.

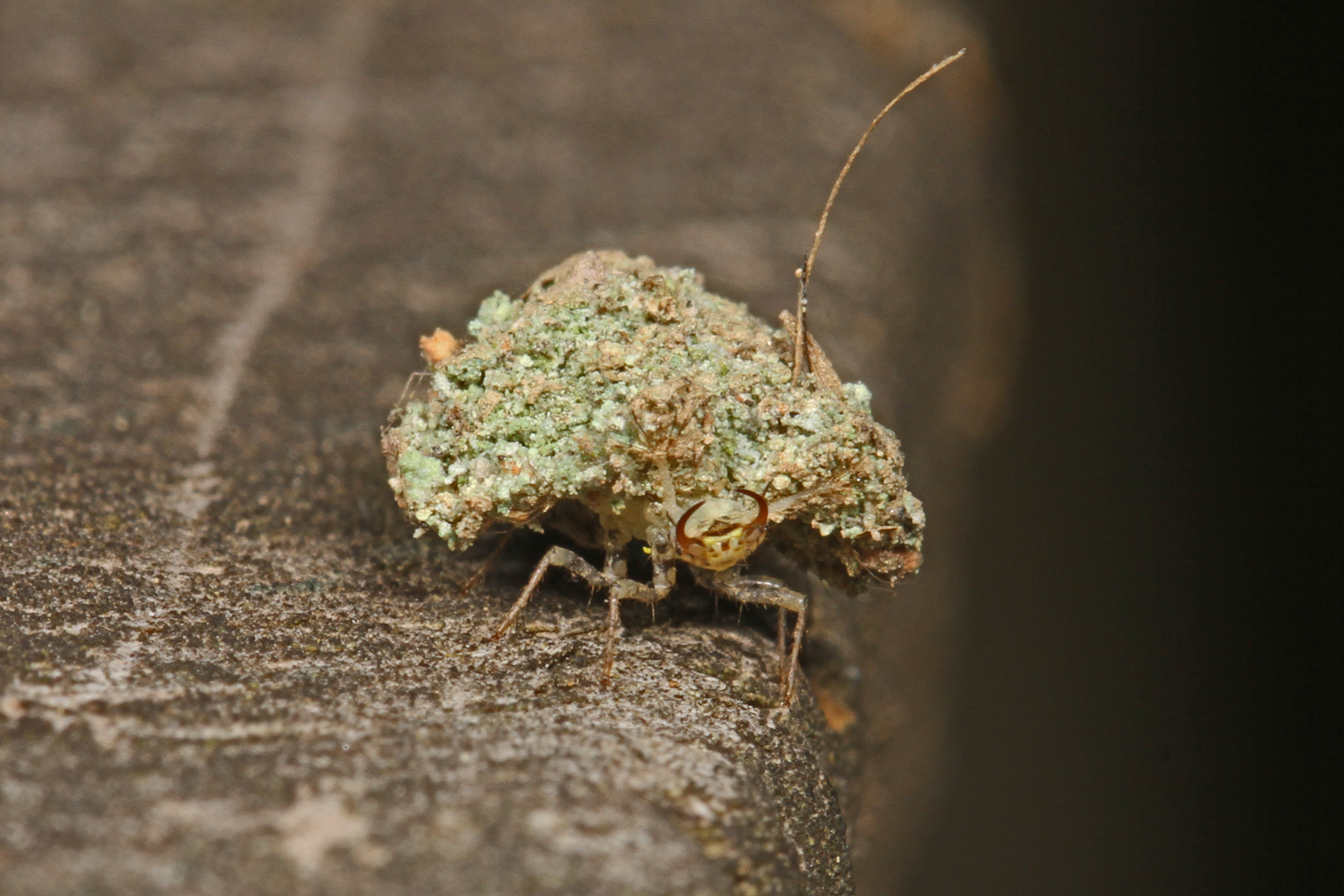
Leucochrysa (Nodita) pavida larva in Virginia

== Genera ==
These seven genera belong to the tribe Leucochrysini:

- Berchmansus Navás, 1913^{i c g} — 2 species
- Cacarulla Navás, 1910^{i c g} — 1 species
- Gonzaga Navás, 1913^{i c g} — 8 species
- Leucochrysa McLachlan, 1868^{i c g b} — 196 species
- Neula Navás, 1917^{i c g} — 1 species
- Nuvol Navás, 1916^{i c g} — 1 species
- Santocellus C. Tauber and Albuquerque in C. Tauber et al., 2008^{i c g} — 4 species

Data sources: i = ITIS, c = Catalogue of Life, g = GBIF, b = Bugguide.net
