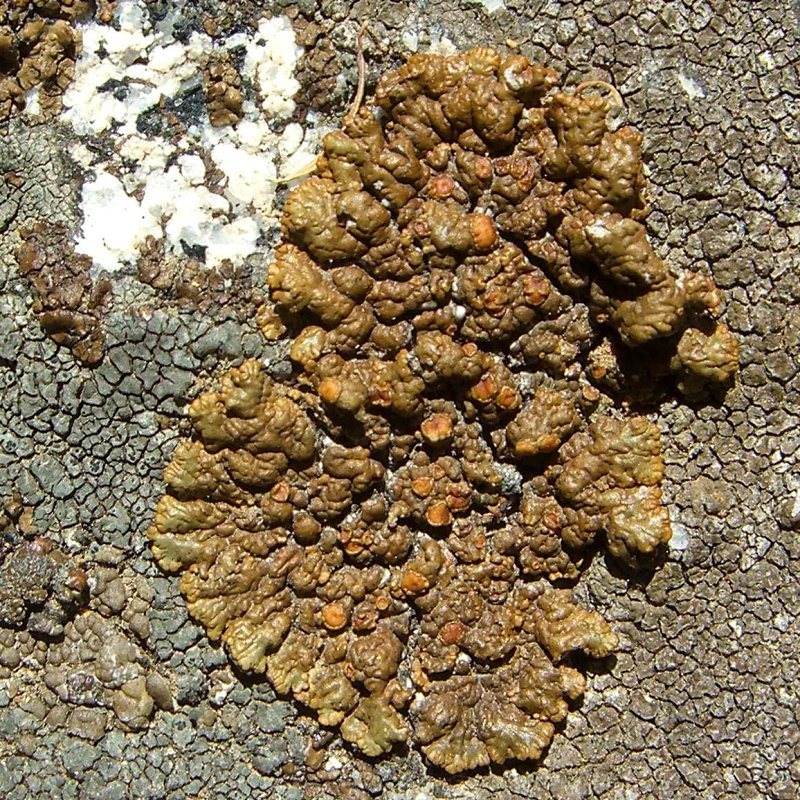

Scientific classification
- Domain: Eukaryota
- Kingdom: Fungi
- Division: Ascomycota
- Class: Lecanoromycetes
- Order: Lecanorales
- Family: Lecanoraceae
- Genus: Lecanora
- Species: L. mellea

Binomial name
- Lecanora mellea W.A.Weber (1975)

= Lecanora mellea =

Species of lichen

Lecanora mellea is a species of crustose lichen in the family Lecanoraceae. Found in North America, it was described as new to science in 1975.

== See also ==
- List of Lecanora species
