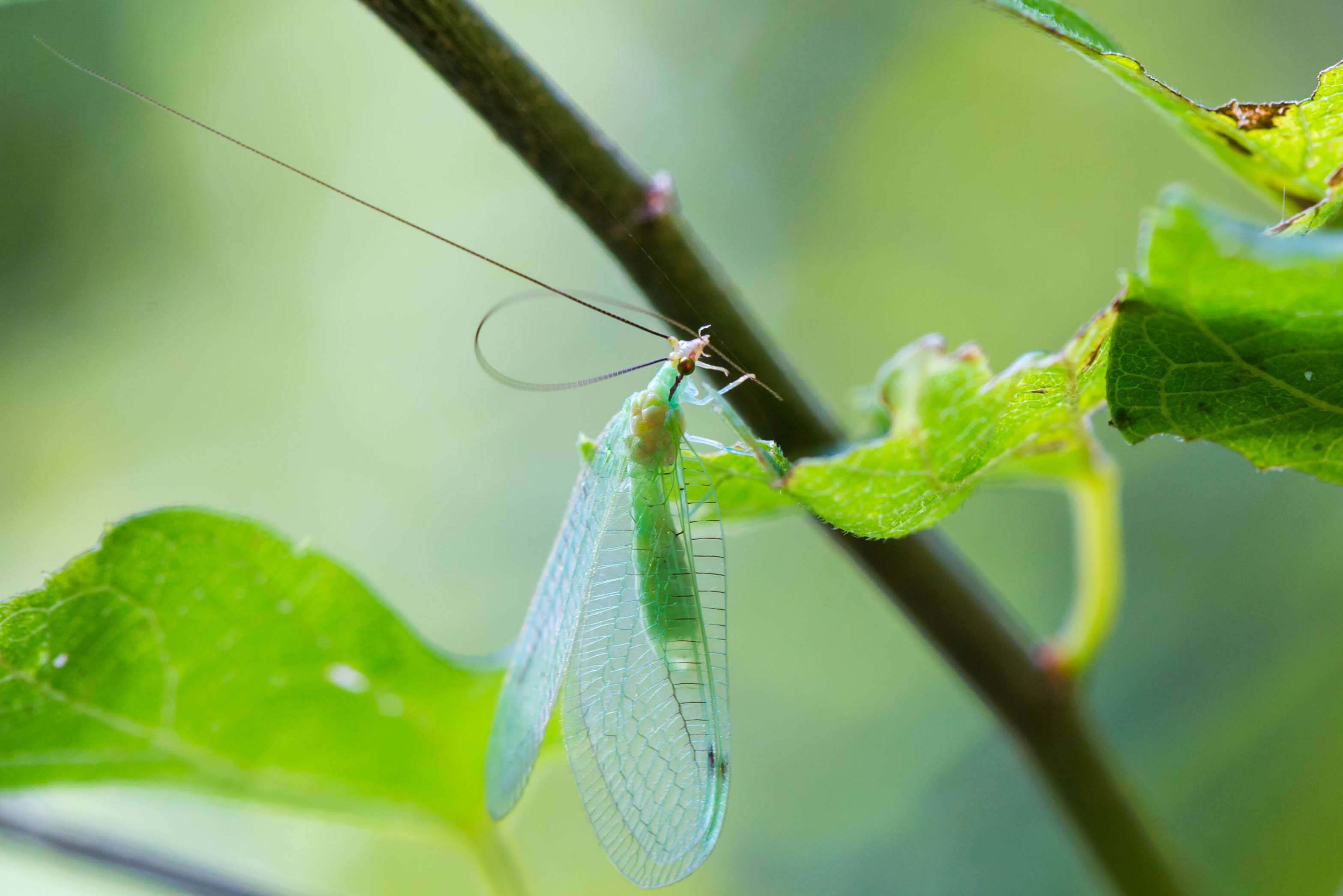
- L. pavida in Tennessee

Scientific classification
- Domain: Eukaryota
- Kingdom: Animalia
- Phylum: Arthropoda
- Class: Insecta
- Order: Neuroptera
- Family: Chrysopidae
- Subfamily: Chrysopinae
- Tribe: Leucochrysini
- Genus: Leucochrysa; McLachlan, 1868

Subgenera
- Leucochrysa (Leucochrysa) McLachlan, 1868; Leucochrysa (Nodita) Navás, 1916

Diversity
- 196 described species

Synonyms
- Lachlanita Navás, 1929

= Leucochrysa =

Genus of lacewings

Leucochrysa is a genus of green lacewings in the family Chrysopidae. As of 2013, there are 196 described species in Leucochrysa, found in the Americas.

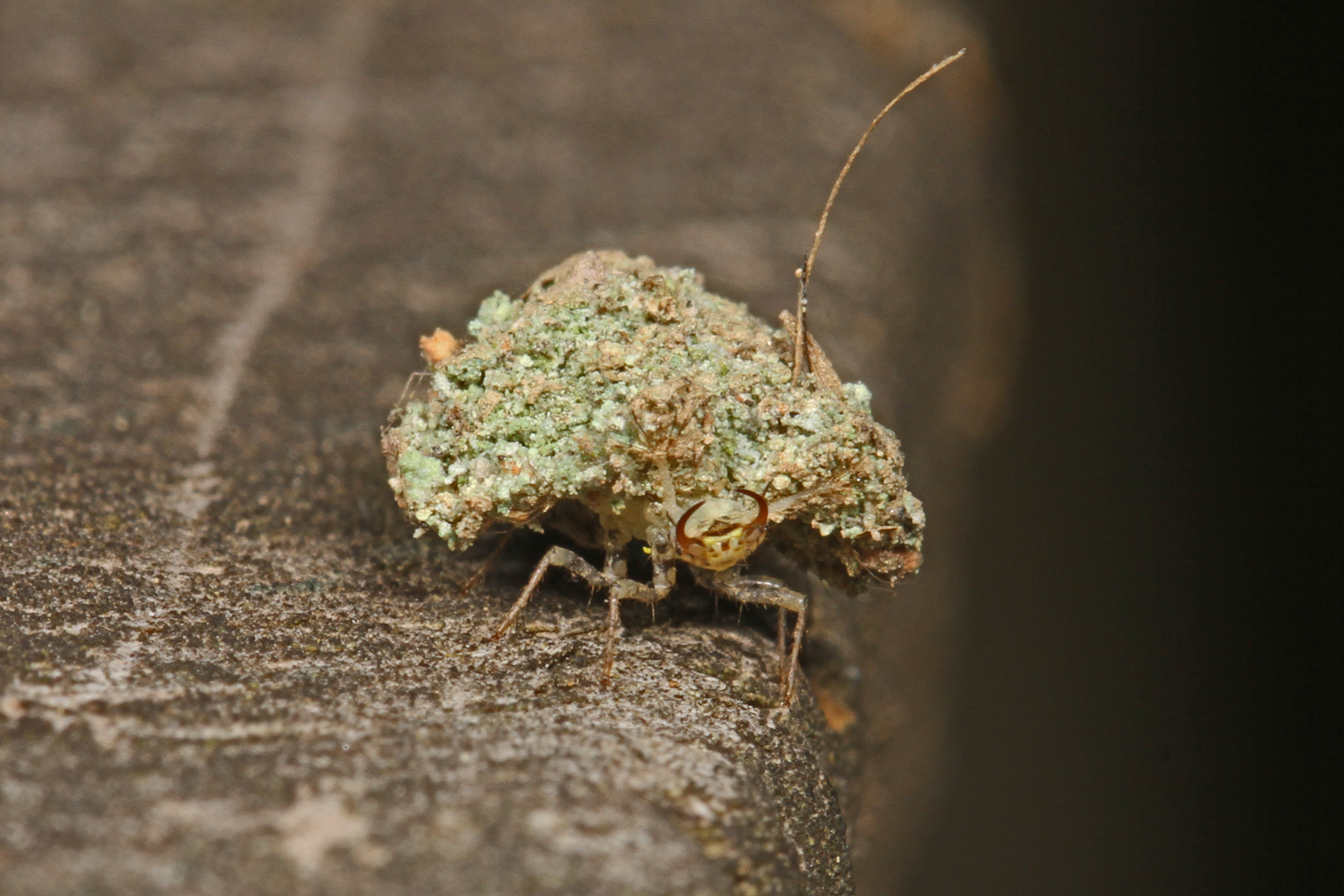
L. pavida larva in Virginia

== See also ==
- List of Leucochrysa species
