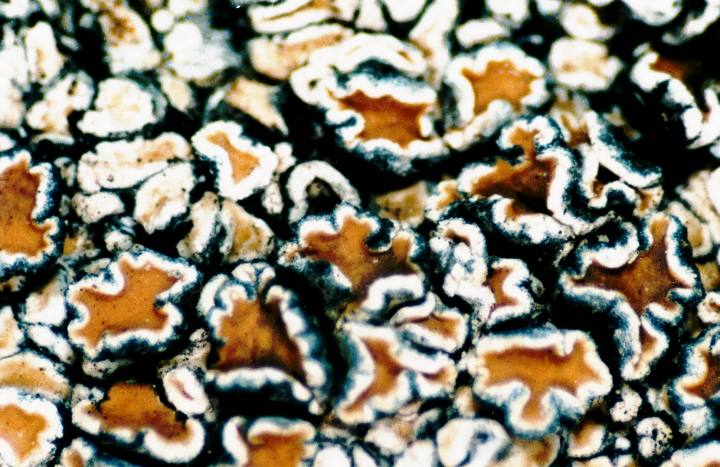
- Lecanora muralis

Scientific classification
- Kingdom: Fungi
- Division: Ascomycota
- Class: Lecanoromycetes
- Order: Lecanorales
- Family: Lecanoraceae
- Genus: Lecanora; Ach. (1809)

Type species
- Lecanora subfusca (L.) Ach. (1810)

Diversity
- about 500 species

= Lecanora =

Genus of lichen-forming fungi

Lecanora is a genus of lichen commonly called rim lichens. Lichens in the genus Squamarina are also called rim lichens. Members of the genus have roughly circular fruiting discs (apothecia) with rims that have photosynthetic tissue similar to that of the nonfruiting part of the lichen body (thallus). Other lichens with apothecia having margins made of thallus-like tissue are called lecanorine.

It is in the family Lecanoraceae in the suborder Lecanorineae.

== Description ==
Lecanora has a crustose thallus, trebouxioid photobiont, colourless ascospores and crystals in the amphothecium.

Swiss lichenologist Rosmarie Honegger used electron microscopy in the late 1970s to investigate ascus structure in several major groups of lichen-forming fungi. She defined the Lecanora-type ascus as one characterized by several distinctive features: (1) a non-amyloid, clear ascus wall that is encased in an amyloid outer layer often described as a fuzzy coat; (2) an amyloid dome filled with granular inclusions set within a clear matrix; (3) a clear central layer inside the dome; and (4) a method of opening, or dehiscence, that is rostrate (resembling the shape of a bird's beak – the ascus has a pointed or protruding tip from which the spores are released).

== Species ==
A 2008 estimate placed over 550 species in the genus. As of July 2022, Index Fungorum lists 245 species in the genus.

- Lecanora campestris (Schaer.) Hue 1888
- Lecanora conizaeoides Nyl. ex Cromb. 1885
- Lecanora gangaleoides, Nyl. 1872
- Lecanora grantii, H. Magn. 1932
- Lecanora helicopis, (Wahlenb. ex Ach.) Ach. 1814
- Lecanora mellea, W.A.Weber (1975)
- Lecanora muralis, (Schreb.) Rabenh. (1845)
- Lecanora poliophaea, (Wahlenb.) Ach. 1810
- Lecanora straminea, Wahlenb. ex Ach.
- Lecanora usneicola, Etayo, 2006

== Gallery ==
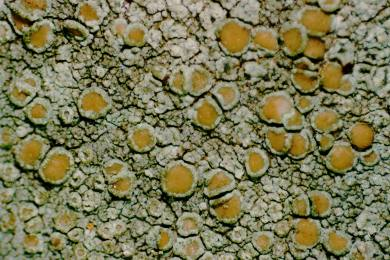
Lecanora strobilina

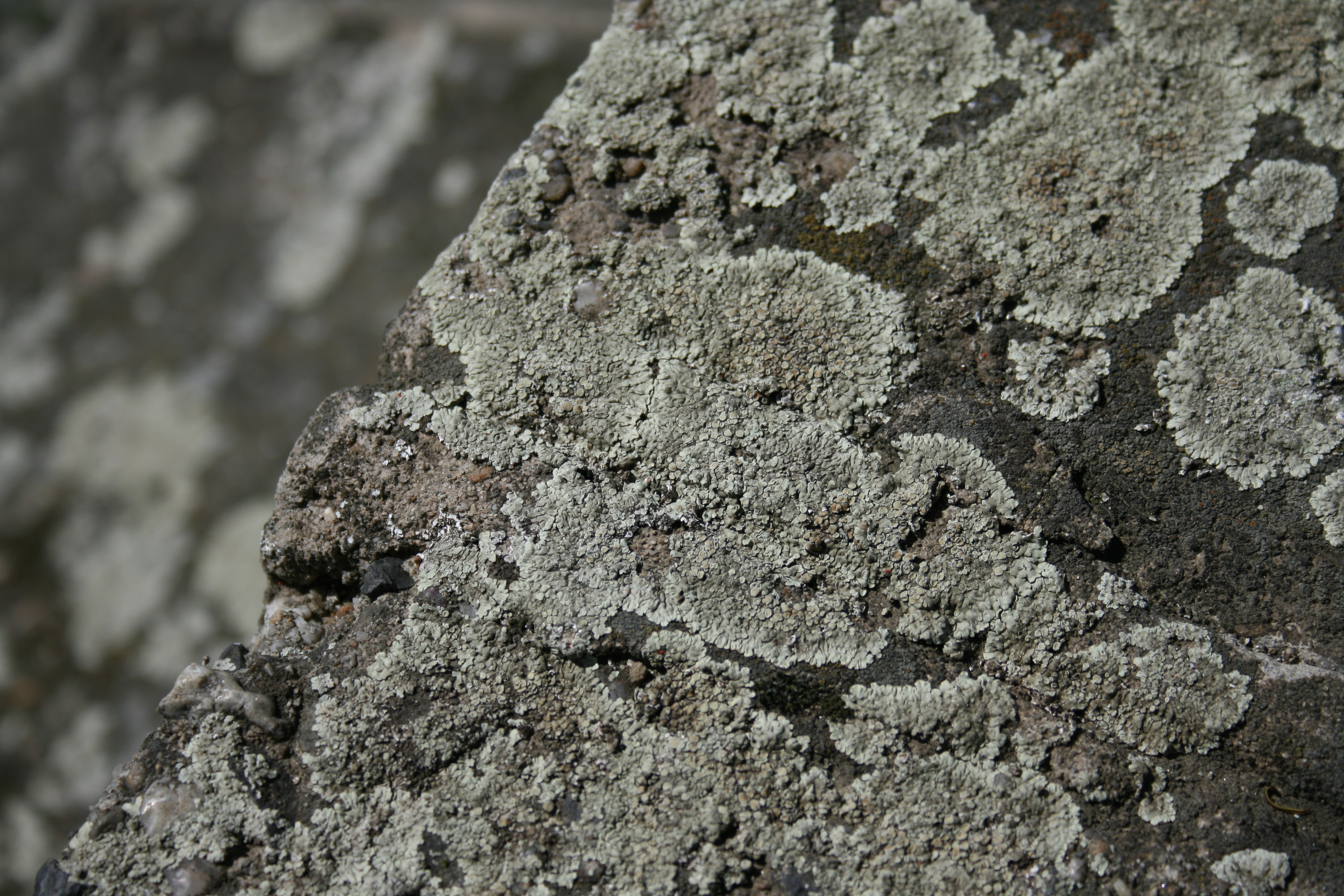
Lecanora cf. muralis lichen on the banks of the Bega canal in Timișoara

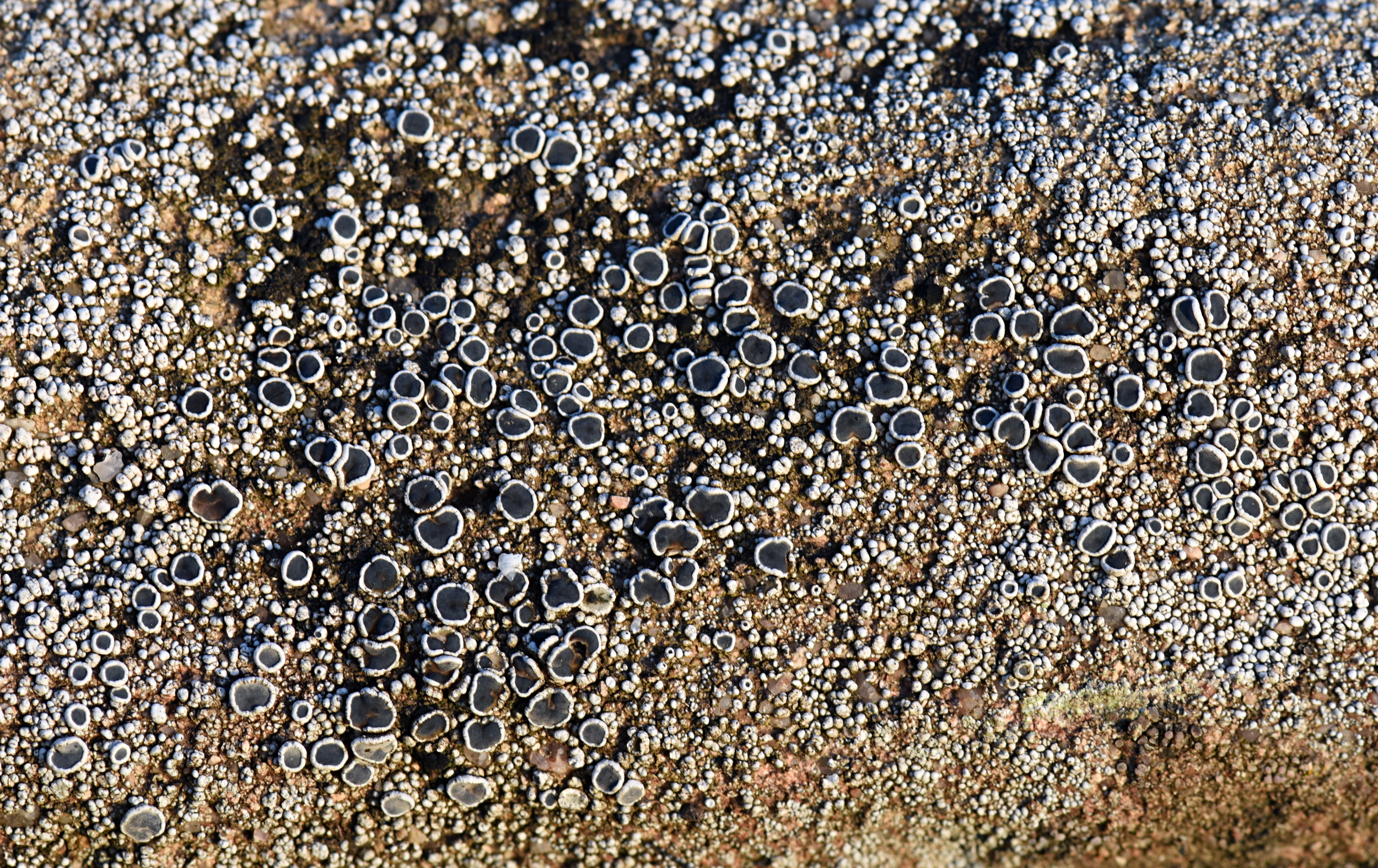
Lecanora from coastal California
