= Lecanora microloba =

Scientific classification
- Kingdom: Fungi
- Division: Ascomycota
- Class: Lecanoromycetes
- Order: Lecanorales
- Family: Lecanoraceae
- Genus: Lecanora
- Species: L. microloba

Binomial name
- Lecanora microloba Śliwa & Flakus (2010)
- Holotype: High Tatra Mountains, Poland

Species of lichen

Lecanora microloba is a species of crustose and areolate lichen in the family Lecanoraceae, formally described in 2010. This lichen is characterized by its distinctive flat areoles that either remain isolated or form small rosette-like structures, with minute lobed margins that give the species its name. Currently known only from two localities in the Polish Tatra Mountains and more recently reported from Ukraine, it grows specifically on mylonitized granite rock intrusions in the highest vegetation belt of the Carpathians. The lichen contains several chemical compounds including gyrophoric acid, usnic acid, and zeorin, which produce characteristic colour reactions in chemical spot tests. In its natural habitat, L. microloba grows alongside several other lichen species and serves as a host for the parasitic lichenicolous fungus Muellerella erratica.

== Taxonomy ==
It was formally described as a new species in 2010 by the Polish lichenologists Lucyna Śliwa and Adam Flakus. The type specimen was found by Flakus in the Hińczowy Żleb gully in the High Tatra Mountains (Western Carpathians) at an altitude of 2,200 m (7,200 ft). Here, in vegetation characteristic of the subnival belt (i.e., just below the snow line and above the tree line), the lichen was found growing on granite rock that was mylonitized. The specific epithet microloba refers to the minute lobe-like areoles in the thallus margins.

== Description ==
Lecanora microloba has well-developed, flat areoles (small, island-like segments) that either remain isolated and scattered or form small rosette-like structures measuring 1–3(–5) mm in diameter. The marginal areoles have a scalloped or minutely lobed appearance, with tiny lobules approximately 0.05–0.15 mm long and 0.05–0.1 mm wide that rise slightly from the substrate. The surface of the lichen is smooth with a protective outer layer (cortex), varying in colour from grey-green to yellow-green. Its photosynthetic partner (photobiont) is a chlorococcoid green alga with cells up to 15 μm in diameter.

The apothecia (fruiting bodies) of L. microloba appear either singly on the areoles or more commonly clustered in the centre of the rosette formations. These structures are broadly attached or slightly narrowed at the base, flat, becoming only slightly convex with age, and measure 0.3–0.6(–0.8) mm across. The disc-like centre of each apothecium is smooth with a yellowish grey to yellowish green colour and lacks a powdery coating (pruina). The margin is faintly prominent or level with the disc, smooth, unbroken, and usually the same colour as the thallus, rarely matching the disc colour. Internally, the thalline exciple (outer layer of the apothecium) eventually becomes reduced to clusters of algae on both sides of the apothecial section.

The microscopic features include a prosoplectenchymatous parathecium (inner wall) that is distinct and well-defined, measuring 35–60 μm wide, often obscured by granules. The spore-producing layer (hymenium) is colourless and 50–70 μm high, while the hypothecium below it is also colourless and 60–90 μm high. The paraphyses (sterile filaments) are thick, septate, and simple to sparsely branched with slightly expanded tips. The spore-containing sacs (asci) are club-shaped, containing eight colourless, non-septate, ellipsoid spores measuring approximately 11.2 by 5.8 μm. Chemically, L. microloba contains gyrophoric acid, usnic acid, and zeorin as major compounds, giving it distinctive colour reactions with chemical spot tests: C+ (rose), KC+ (rose) (indicating gyrophoric acid), while it reacts negatively to P tests.

== Habitat, distribution, and ecology ==
Lecanora microloba is known from two localities in the Polish Tatra Mountains, where it grows specifically on mylonitized granite rock intrusions in the highest climatic vegetation belt of the Carpathians. These small tectonic zones within the crystalline part of the Tatra Mountains are recognised as biodiversity hotspots within the Carpathian range. Based on examination of herbarium specimens of related species (L. polytropa and L. intricata) housed at the KRAM herbarium, researchers believe this species may be restricted to this particular geological habitat, suggesting it could potentially be discovered in other regions that feature similar rock formations. In 2023, L. microloba was reported from Ukraine.

In its natural habitat, L. microloba is found growing alongside several other lichen species, including Aspicilia simoënsis, Bellemerea alpina, B. subsorediza, Lecanora polytropa, Lecidea auriculata, Porpidia macrocarpa, Rhizocarpon geographicum, and Thelidium papulare. Lecanora microloba serves as a host for the lichenicolous fungus species Muellerella erratica, which grows parasitically on its thallus. Lichenicolous fungi are specialised organisms that live exclusively on lichens and often display high host-specificity.

== See also ==
- List of Lecanora species
