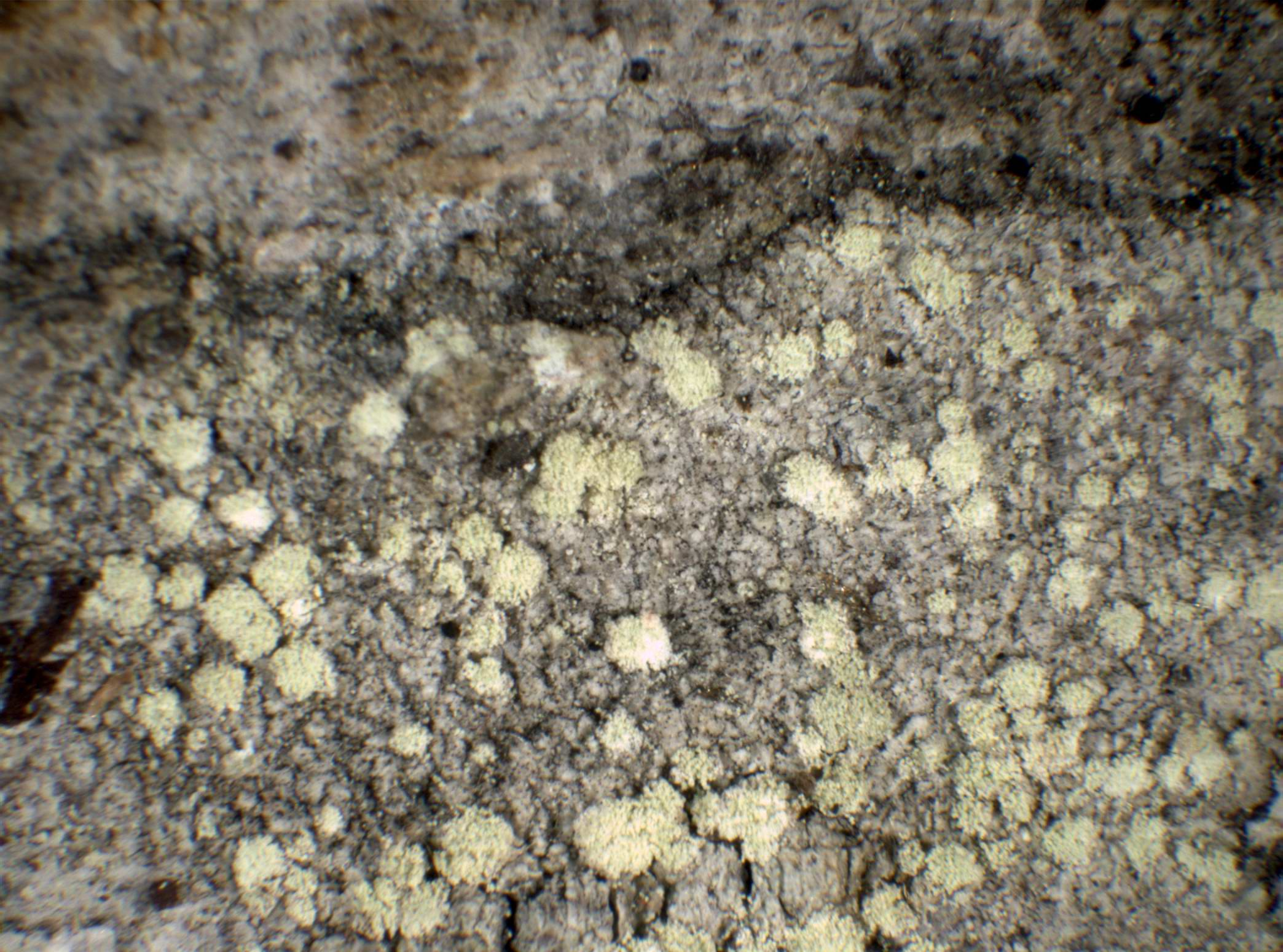

Scientific classification
- Kingdom: Fungi
- Division: Ascomycota
- Class: Lecanoromycetes
- Order: Lecanorales
- Family: Lecanoraceae
- Genus: Lecanora
- Species: L. jamesii

Binomial name
- Lecanora jamesii J.R.Laundon (1963)

= Lecanora jamesii =

Species of lichen-forming fungus

Lecanora jamesii is a species of lichen-forming fungus in the family Lecanoraceae. It is a grey, crust-forming lichen distinguished by its scattered, pale citron-yellow powdery patches (soralia) and an unusual chemical compound, 2-O-methylsulphurellin. Fruiting bodies (apothecia) are rarely produced. The species grows on the bark of deciduous trees in humid habitats, and has been recorded from western Europe, the Pacific coast of North America, and parts of western Asia.

== Taxonomy ==
Lecanora jamesii was described as a new species by Jack Laundon in 1963, based on material collected from the bark of willow in Pembrokeshire, Wales. In earlier British collections it had been misidentified as Lecanora impudens (as characterised by Peter James in 1960), but Laundon showed that the two are distinct in both appearance and ecology.

A later taxonomic revision placed Lecanora jamesii among the usnic acid-containing members of the Lecanora subfusca group, and emphasized that it differs from related taxa by its combination of a relatively dark thallus, distinct yellowish soralia, and a characteristic chemistry that includes 2-O-methylsulphurellin.

Laundon also re-examined the type material of L. impudens and concluded that it matches specimens treated in Britain as Lecanora allophana f. sorediata, meaning that published British records under the name L. impudens were based on a misapplication. L. jamesii does not appear to have any close British look-alikes when fertile. Its small, greenish-toned fruiting bodies (apothecia) suggest a relationship to the L. expallens and L. varia groups, but it differs in its grey thallus and its very distinctive soralia. In the 2022 British and Irish revision of the family, the species was treated as a member of the Lecanora polytropa group.

== Description ==
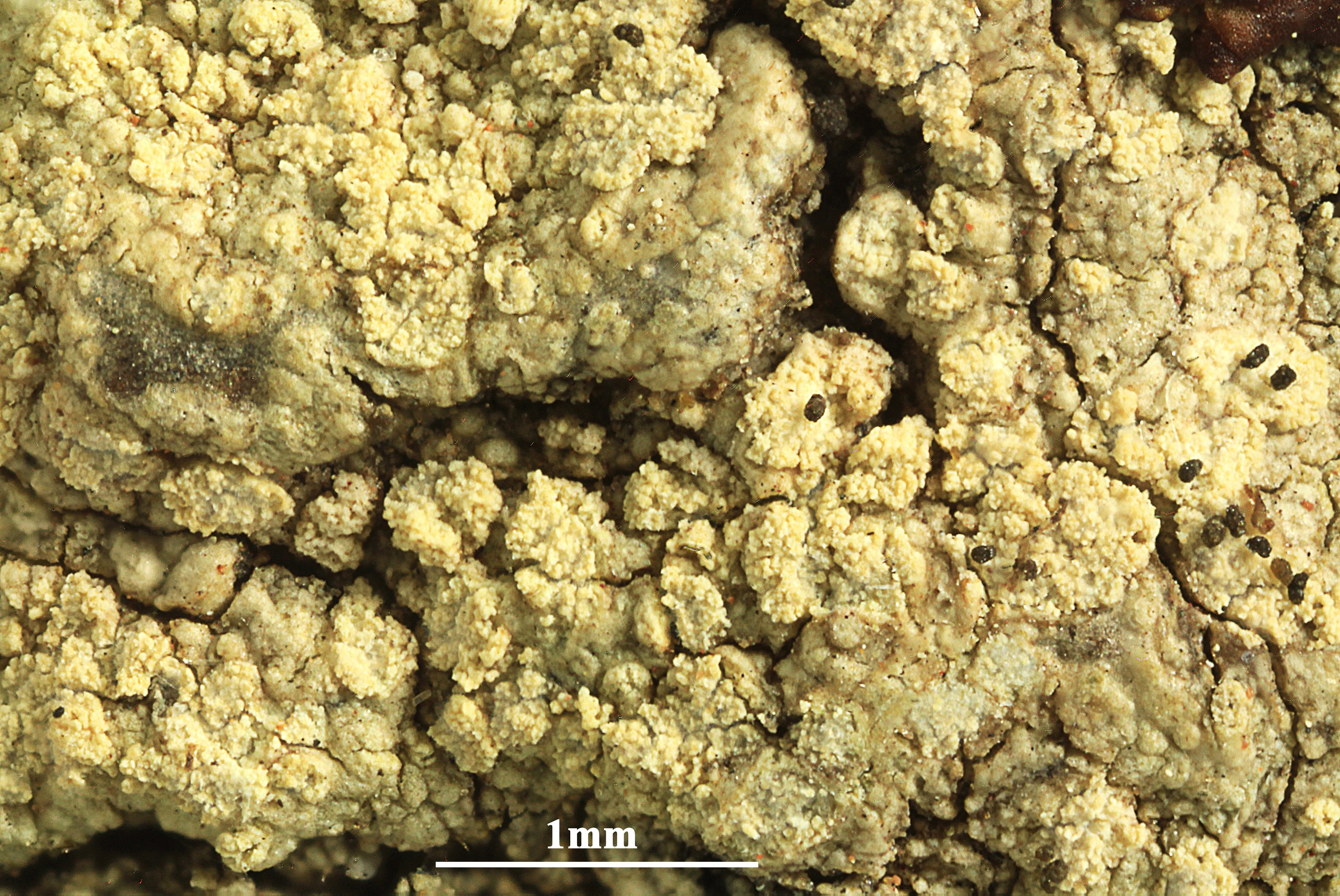
Closeup of the sorediate thallus

The lichen body (thallus) forms a thin, continuous crust that is pale grey to grey and smooth to slightly granular. A black basal layer (hypothallus) may or may not be present. The species reproduces vegetatively by soredia (powdery granules), which are floury (farinose), pale citron yellow when fresh (paler in dried herbarium material), and grouped into discrete clusters (soralia) up to about 1 mm across; these are scattered over the thallus rather than forming a confluent sorediate mass. A later revision described the thallus as smooth to granular and the rounded soralia as 0.2–1.4 mm in diameter. The thallus contains discrete clusters of large oxalate crystals, which become visible as translucent spots when the surface is moistened and can help in recognising sterile material.

Fruiting bodies (apothecia) are uncommon and small, reaching about 1 mm across and typically 0.3–0.9 mm in diameter. They are initially rounded but may later become irregular; the thallus-derived rim (thalline margin) is at first distinct but later disappears. The disc is level with the margin when mature and usually pale green to brownish green, only rarely becoming almost black. Under the microscope, the asci each contain eight simple, colourless spores that are broadly oval (ellipsoid) and measure 8.5–14.5 × 5.5–8.0 μm. Standard spot tests on the thallus and soredia are negative, or at most faintly yellow with potassium hydroxide solution. The species is also chemically distinctive in containing 2-O-methylsulphurellin, reported as unique to this species.

== Similar species ==
Among the few sorediate members of Lecanora sensu stricto (in the strict sense) that contain usnic acid, Lecanora jamesii is distinguished partly by its chemistry, particularly the presence of 2-O-methylsulphurellin. It differs from L. elatinoides, another sorediate usnic acid-containing species, in its chemical profile, while L. brodoana and L. mobergiana differ in having an uppermost spore-bearing layer (epihymenium) that lacks granular inclusions. Other similar species include L. floridula and L. transvaalensis, but these also differ from L. jamesii in a combination of anatomical features and chemistry. In a later identification key to European sorediate corticolous species of Lecanora, L. jamesii was distinguished from the superficially similar L. thysanophora by its lack of a webby (arachnoid) prothallus, its well-defined soralia, and the presence of 2-O-methylsulphurellin. Poorly developed thalli can resemble Lecanora barkmaniana, especially on Salix, but that species has deeper yellow soralia and a much stronger yellow reaction in K spot tests. Fertile material may also recall L. farinaria, which has darker apothecial discs and different chemistry. In damp woodland habitats the species may also be confused with Biatora britannica, which has greener soralia and a Pd+ (orange) reaction; rock-dwelling material can resemble Coccotrema citrinescens, whose soralia give a vivid K+ (yellow) reaction.

== Habitat and distribution ==
In Britain and Ireland, Lecanora jamesii grows mainly on the bark of deciduous trees and only rarely on wood. Laundon considered it an Atlantic species, intolerant of nitrogen enrichment (nitrophobous) and confined to upland and western districts ("Highland Britain" in the older usage), where it favours smooth bark in very humid situations such as over water or around boggy ground. His records came from Wales (including Pembrokeshire, Merioneth, and Caernarfon), north-west England (Cumbria), western Scotland (including the Sunart–Morvern area), the Inner Hebrides, and a number of Irish localities, especially in the west and south-west.

The species has since proved to be more widespread. On the Pacific coast of North America, it was reported from coastal lowlands up to about 240 m elevation in British Columbia, Washington, Oregon, and California, mostly on Alnus rubra but also on Lithocarpus densiflorus, Salix, and Thuja plicata; there too it showed clear oceanic affinities while tending to avoid deeply shaded sites. In Brazil, it was recorded from Tocantins. In Europe, later authors confirmed it from oceanic parts of western Europe and from humid parts of the Austrian Alps, listing specimens from Austria, France, and Great Britain. It has also been recorded from Iran and from Turkey, where it was found in beech forest on the smooth bark of Fagus orientalis on Kazdağı Mountain at 1,300 m elevation.

The lichenicolous fungus species Pyrenidium actinellum has also been recorded several times from this species.

== See also ==
- List of Lecanora species
