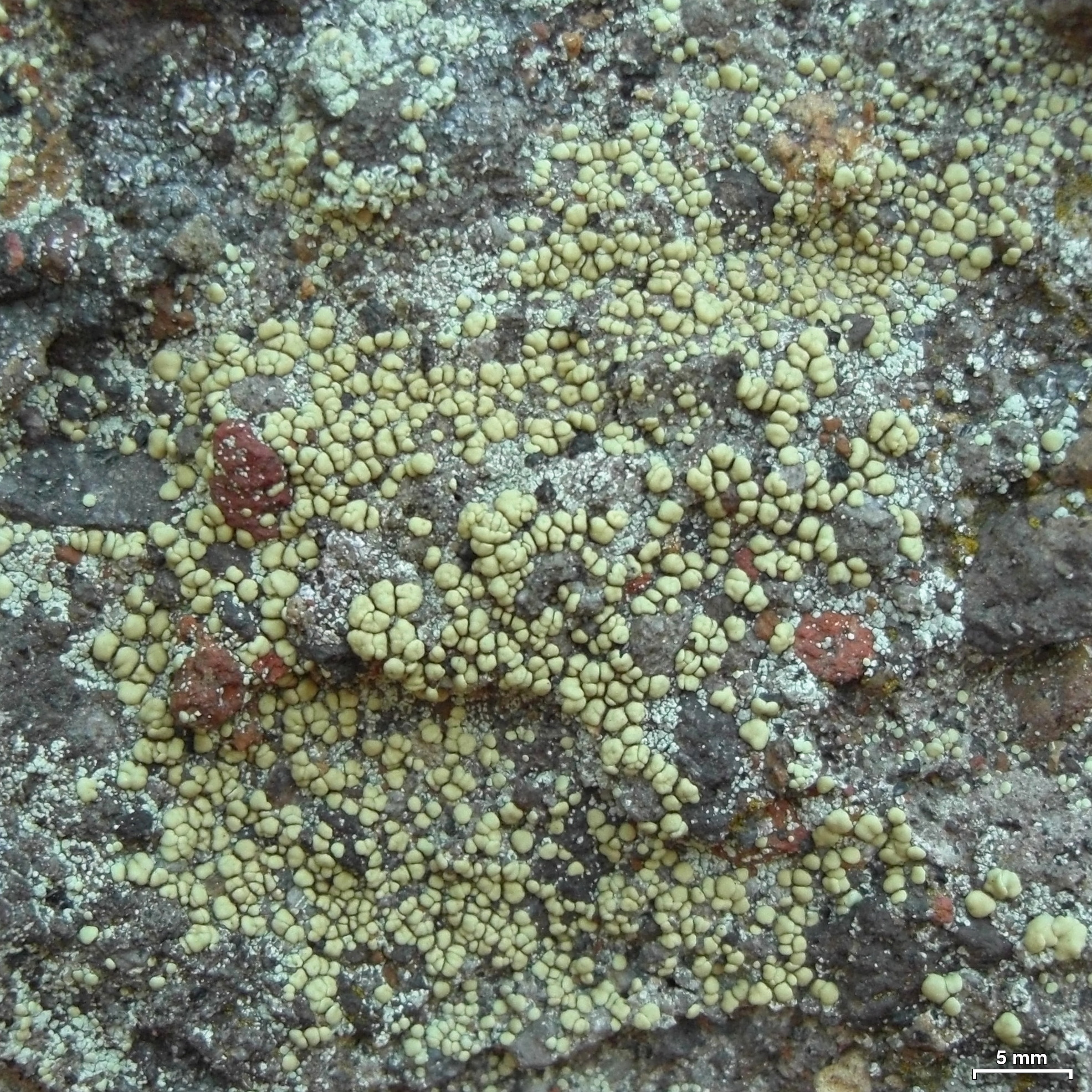

Conservation status
- Secure (NatureServe)

Scientific classification
- Kingdom: Fungi
- Division: Ascomycota
- Class: Lecanoromycetes
- Order: Lecanorales
- Family: Lecanoraceae
- Genus: Lecanora
- Species: L. polytropa

Binomial name
- Lecanora polytropa (Ehrh.) Rabenh. (1845)

Synonyms
- Verrucaria polytropa Ehrh. (1796)

= Lecanora polytropa =

Species of lichen

Lecanora polytropa, the granite-speck rim lichen, is a species of saxicolous (rock-dwelling), crustose lichen in the family Lecanoraceae. A small, inconspicuous species that grows in the cracks of rock surfaces, it has a cosmopolitan distribution and has been recorded on all continents, including Antarctica.

== Taxonomy ==
It was originally described by German botanist Jakob Friedrich Ehrhart in 1796 as a species of Verrucaria. He wrote of the lichen "flavo-virens scutellis undique conspersa plano-convexis e dilute carneo flavescentibus. In saxis montosis" ('with yellow-green shields scattered everywhere, flat-convex, becoming yellowish from pale flesh-colored. On mountain rocks.') Gottlob Ludwig Rabenhorst transferred the taxon to the genus Lecanora in 1845.

A vernacular name for the species is the "granite-speck rim lichen".

Recent genetic research has revealed that Lecanora polytropa likely represents one of the largest species complexes known among lichen-forming fungi. A 2022 study by Zhang and colleagues using DNA sequencing and phylogenomic analysis found that what has traditionally been considered a single species actually comprises up to 75 distinct candidate species. The researchers sampled over 300 specimens from populations worldwide and used multiple genetic markers, including the fungal DNA barcode (internal transcribed spacer region). Their results suggest that L. polytropa, in the broad sense, harbours extensive cryptic diversity, with most candidate species having limited geographic distributions. This finding highlights the need for a thorough taxonomic revision of the L. polytropa complex using integrative approaches combining genetic, morphological, and ecological data to fully characterise its true biodiversity.

== Description ==
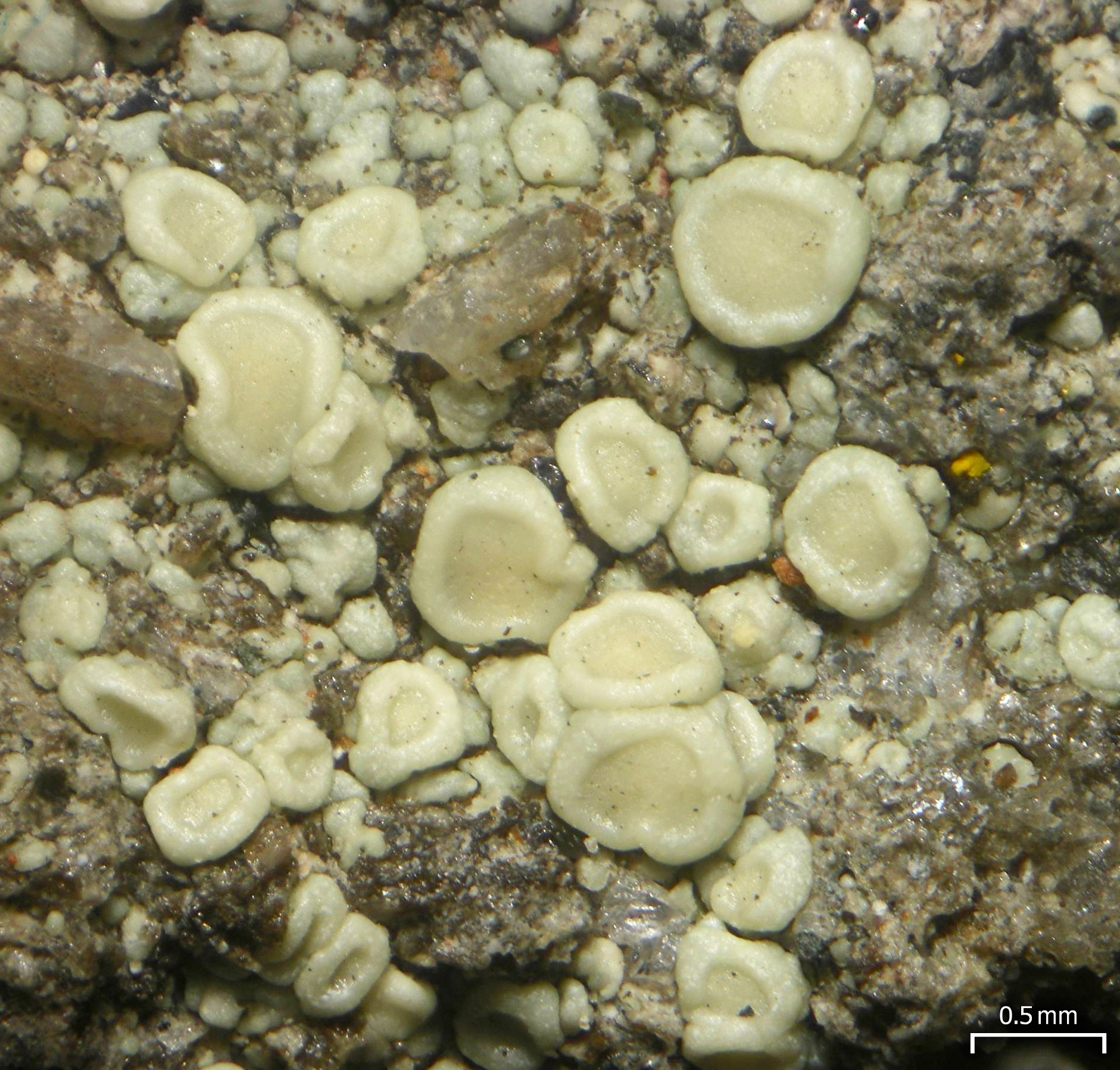
Closeup of apothecia on rock surface; scale bar is 0.5 mm

Lecanora polytropa has a scanty thallus, which sometimes resembles tiny pale yellowish areoles. The tiny, flat apothecia typically measure 0.3–0.9 mm in diameter and may be scattered or clustered together. They have a waxy texture and are yellow to pale orange, lacking pruina. The margins of the apothecia are smooth, not prominent, and tend to be lighter in colour than the central disc. Ascospores are ellipsoid and measure 8–15 by 5–7 μm.

== Habitat and distribution ==
Lecanora polytropa grows on siliceous rock, particularly granite. It prefers locations with full sun exposure. It is common on exposed granite boulders and outcrops throughout its range, although it may readily be missed due to its small size. The lichen has a cosmopolitan distribution, and is known from all continents. It is found in the maritime and continental Antarctic, including the Antarctic Peninsula, Queen Mary Land, and Victoria Land.

In a study of the community structure of saxicolous lichens found on rock faces within a 4 kilometres (2.5 miles) radius of the Mount Tokachi volcano in Japan, researchers found that Lecanora polytropa thrived in the volcanic environment (close to the active fumarole) that was intolerable for many other species. Its tiny thalli can insert into the small depressions and cracks on the rock, helping it gain a foothold and begin surface colonisation even when faced with the weathering associated with high winds and storms. Lecanora polytropa is also involved in the succession of lichens that appear on gravestones, and tends to maintain its presence long after its initial colonisation. Lecanora polytropa was one of three lichens found growing at an altitude of 7,400 m (24,300 ft) in Makalu (Nepal)–the highest recorded elevation for lichen.

== Species interactions ==
Lecanora polytropa is a known host to the lichenicolous fungus species Carbonea aggregantula, Carbonea supersparsa, Carbonea vitellinaria, Cercidospora epipolytropa, Endococcus propinquus, Lichenoconium lecanorae, Muellerella erratica, Muellerella lichenicola, Muellerella pygmaea var. athallina and Stigmidium squamariae. Two additional species of Arthonia infecting this lichen, A. epipolytropa and A. subclemens, were described in 2023.

== Similar species ==
Lecanora polytropa may be confused with L. fuscobrunnea, which has larger apothecia (up to 1.6 mm wide) that are partially blackened to completely black, and may have a rudimentary stipe. In L. polytropa, the apothecia are always sessile and not blackened.

== See also ==
- List of Lecanora species
