= Carbonea austroshetlandica =

Scientific classification
- Domain: Eukaryota
- Kingdom: Fungi
- Division: Ascomycota
- Class: Lecanoromycetes
- Order: Lecanorales
- Family: Lecanoraceae
- Genus: Carbonea
- Species: C. austroshetlandica

Binomial name
- Carbonea austroshetlandica Alstrup & Olech 2018

Species of lichen

Carbonea austroshetlandica is a species of lichenicolous fungus belonging to the family Lecanoraceae. It was discovered in the South Shetland Islands where it grows on Carbonea assentiens but has since been reported from King George Island where it uses Rhizocarpon geographicum as a host.

== Description ==
Carbonea austroshetlandica has dispersed to aggregated ascomata, which are up to 0.3 mm in diameter, abruptly becoming convex with excluded margin. Hypothecium and exciple are dark brown and the epihymenium is greenish. The hymenium is hyaline, 35–48 μm high and stains blue with KI solution. Paraphyses are branched and anastomosing, slightly enlarged at the apex. Asci are broadly ellipsoid, 28–32 × 15–16 μm. Ascospores hyaline, ellipsoid, simple, 9–10 × 3.5–4.5 μm.

== Ecology ==
Carbonea austroshetlandica is a parasite or saprobe, unlike the similar Carbonea aggregantula which has a symbiotic relationship with its host.
