= Institute of Botany (disambiguation) =

The Institute of Botany is a research institute affiliated with the Chinese Academy of Sciences.

Institute of Botany may also refer to:

- Jiangsu Institute of Botany, in Nanjing, Jiangsu, China
- Kunming Institute of Botany, in Kunming, Yunnan China
- Władysław Szafer Institute of Botany, in Kraków, Poland

== See also ==
- National Institute of Agricultural Botany, England, United Kingdom
