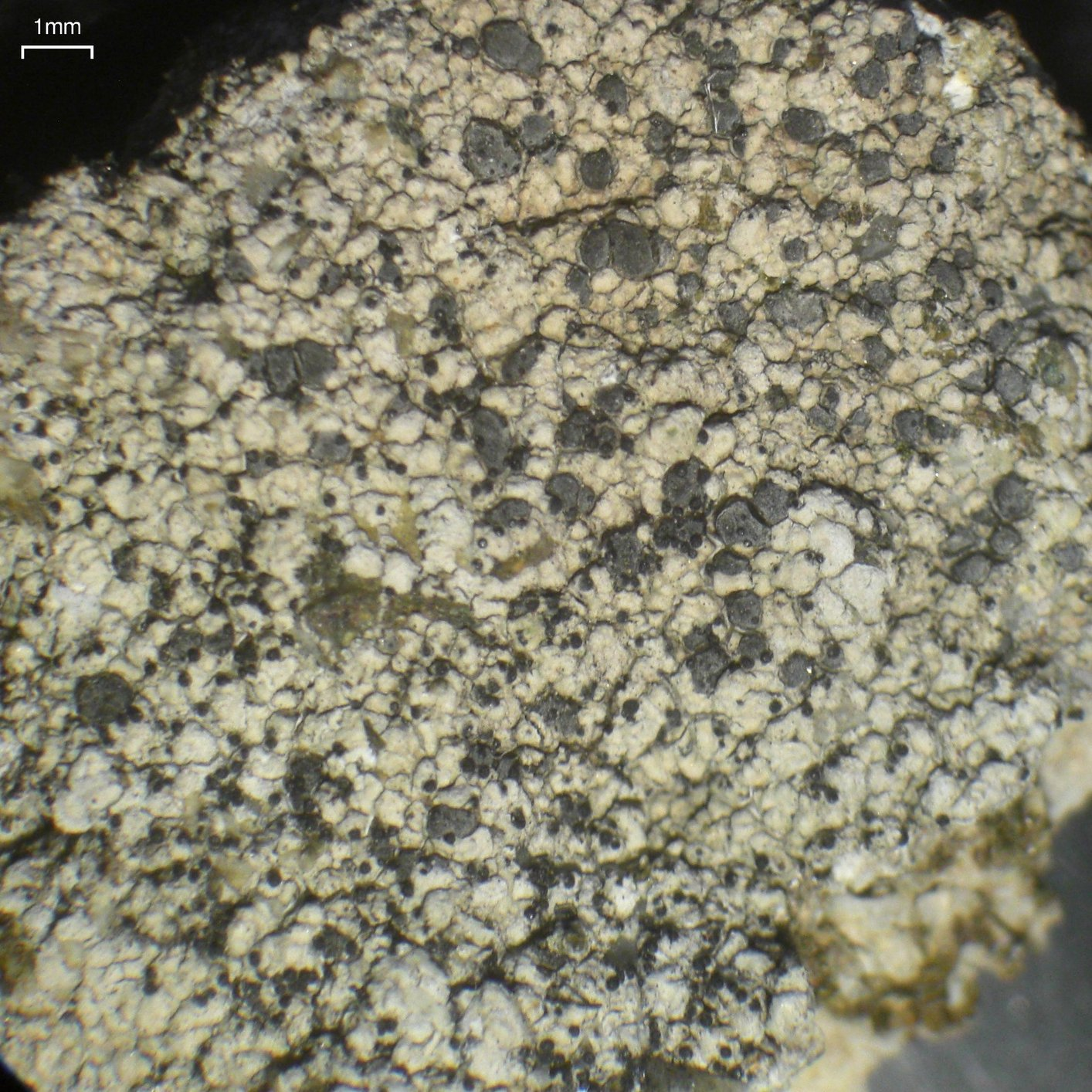
- Muellerella pygmaea var. athallina

Scientific classification
- Domain: Eukaryota
- Kingdom: Fungi
- Division: Ascomycota
- Class: Eurotiomycetes
- Order: Verrucariales
- Family: Verrucariaceae
- Genus: Muellerella; Hepp ex Müll.Arg. (1862)

Type species
- Muellerella polyspora Hepp ex Müll.Arg. (1862)

= Muellerella =

Genus of lichen

Muellerella is a genus of lichenicolous lichens in the family Verrucariaceae. The genus has a widespread distribution, especially in northern temperate areas, and contains species that live on other lichens, or on liverworts.

Molecular phylogenetic analysis published in 2019 indicates that the genus, as currently circumscribed, is polyphyletic. M. atricola and M. lichenicola form one monophyletic lineage in the genus, but the rest of the species tested fell into two distinct monophyletic lineages. The authors suggest the placement of the genus within the subclass Chaetothyriomycetidae, but acknowledge that more genetic analysis is required to determine the correct placement of the type species, Muellerella polyspora.

== Species ==
- Muellerella antarctica Etayo (2008)
- Muellerella erratica (A.Massal.) Hafellner & Volk. John (2006)
- Muellerella frullaniae Döbbeler & Triebel (1985)
- Muellerella hospitans Stizenb. (1863)
- Muellerella lecanactidis Diederich & van den Boom (2003)
- Muellerella lichenicola (Sommerf.) D.Hawksw. (1979)
- Muellerella polyspora Hepp ex Müll.Arg. (1862)
- Muellerella pygmaea (Körb.) D.Hawksw. (1979)
- Muellerella rubescens Döbbeler & Triebel (1985)
- Muellerella stictinae (H.Olivier) Vouaux (1913)
- Muellerella thalamita (Nyl. ex Cromb.) D.Hawksw., F.Berger & LaGreca (2014)
- Muellerella ventosicola (Mudd) D.Hawksw. (2003)
- Muellerella vesicularia (Linds.) D.Hawksw. (1985)
