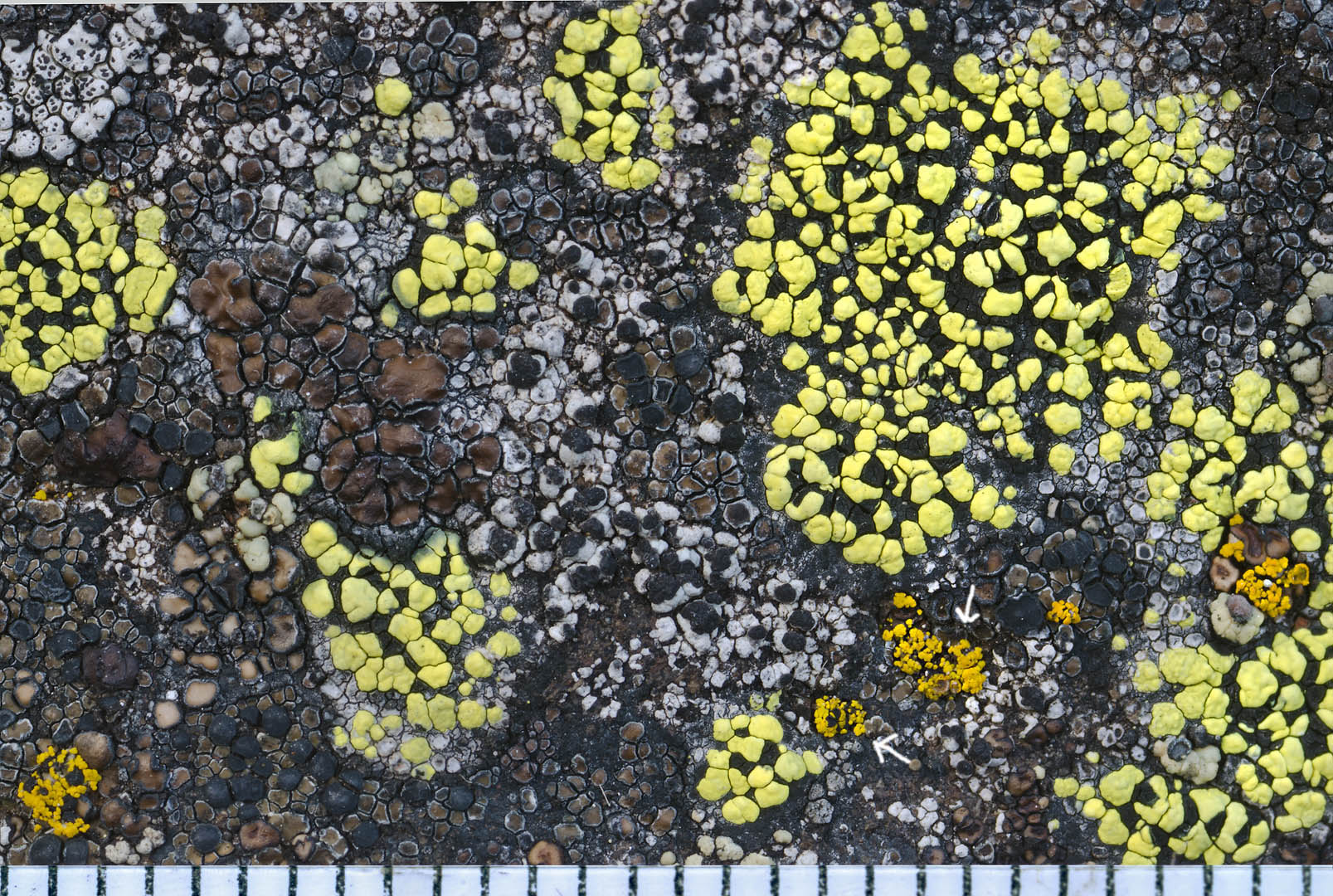
- Carbonea vitellinaria

Scientific classification
- Domain: Eukaryota
- Kingdom: Fungi
- Division: Ascomycota
- Class: Lecanoromycetes
- Order: Lecanorales
- Family: Lecanoraceae
- Genus: Carbonea (Hertel) Hertel (1983)

Type species
- Carbonea atronivea (Arnold) Hertel (1983)

Synonyms
- Lecidea subgen. Carbonea Hertel (1967)

= Carbonea =

Genus of fungi

Carbonea is a genus of fungi in the family Lecanoraceae. Most of the species grow on lichens. The genus is widespread, and contains 20 species. Carbonea was originally circumscribed as a subgenus of Lecidea in 1967 before it was promoted to generic status in 1983.

== Species ==
- Carbonea agellata (Darb.) Fryday (2012)
- Carbonea aggregantula (Müll.Arg.) Diederich & Triebel (2003)
- Carbonea antarctica (C.W.Dodge & G.E.Baker) D.Hawksw. & Iturr. (2006)
- Carbonea assentiens (Nyl.) Hertel (1984)
- Carbonea assimilis (Hampe ex Körb.) Hafellner & Hertel (1987)
- Carbonea atronivea (Arnold) Hertel (1983)
- Carbonea austroshetlandica Alstrup & Olech 2018
- Carbonea gallowayi Hertel (2007)
- Carbonea hypopurpurea Fryday (2012) – Falkland Islands
- Carbonea intrudens (H.Magn.) Hafellner (2006)
- Carbonea invadens (H.Magn.) M.P.Andreev (2004)
- Carbonea latypizodes (Nyl.) Knoph & Rambold (2001)
- Carbonea montevidensis (Müll.Arg.) Rambold & Knoph (1989)
- Carbonea neuropogonis Etayo (2008)
- Carbonea nivaria (Arnold) Rambold (2010)
- Carbonea phaeostoma (Nyl.) Hertel (1984)
- Carbonea subdeclinans (Müll.Arg.) Hertel ex Fryday (2012)
- Carbonea supersparsa (Nyl.) Hertel (1983)
- Carbonea tephromelae M.Svensson & M.Westb. (2021) – Sweden
- Carbonea viriduloatra (B.de Lesd.) Hafellner (2018)
- Carbonea vitellinaria (Nyl.) Hertel (1983)
- Carbonea vorticosa (Flörke) Hertel (1983)
