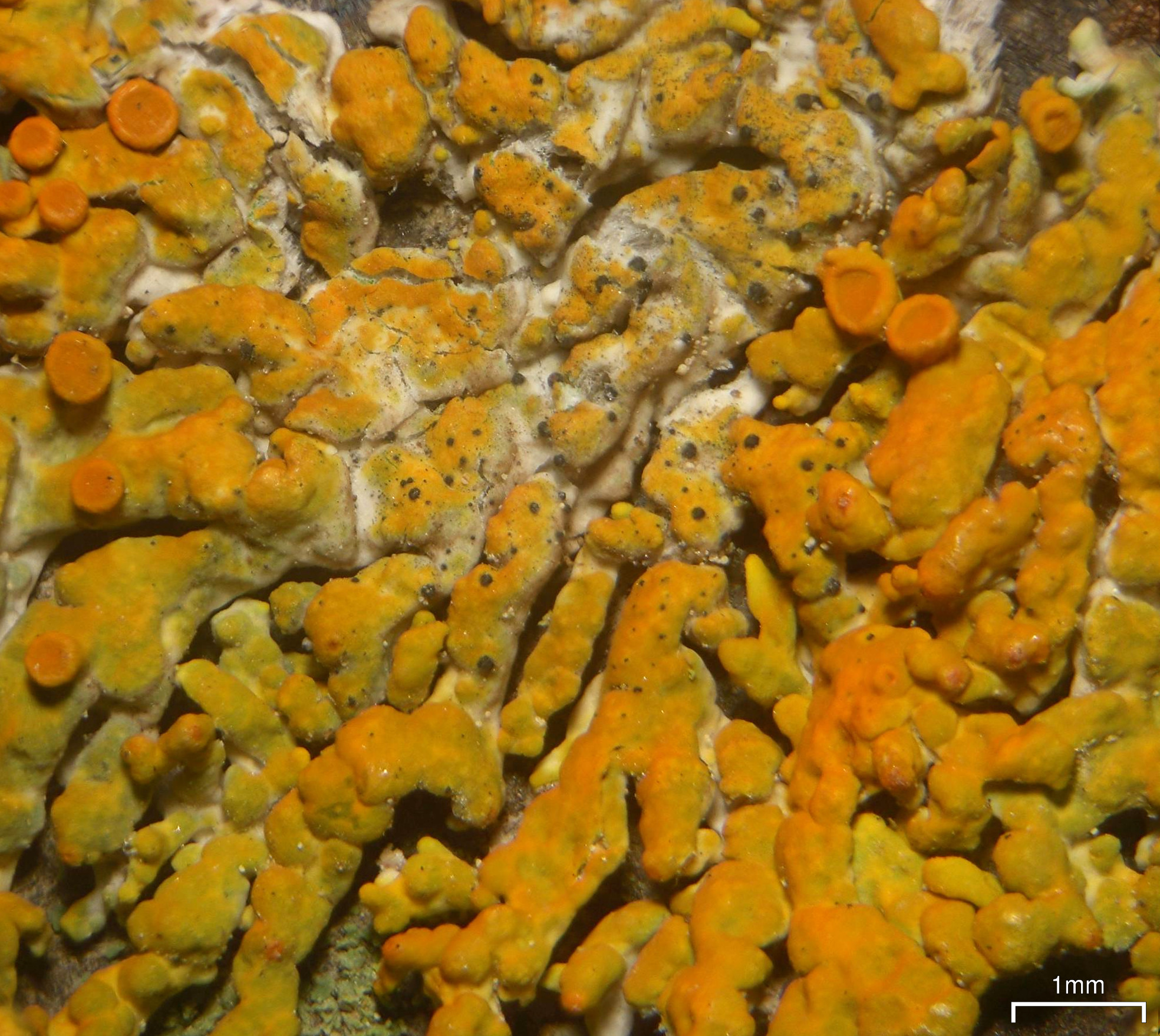
- Muellerella lichenicola growing on Caloplaca

Scientific classification
- Kingdom: Fungi
- Division: Ascomycota
- Class: Eurotiomycetes
- Order: Verrucariales
- Family: Verrucariaceae
- Genus: Muellerella
- Species: M. lichenicola

Binomial name
- Muellerella lichenicola (Sommerf.) D.Hawksw. (1979)

Synonyms
- List: Arthopyrenia cookei (Linds.) Arnold (1874); Delphinella cookei (Linds.) E.Müll. (1962); Endococcus atricola (Linds.) H.Olivier; Microthelia atricola Linds. (1869); Microthelia cookei Linds. (1869); Muellerella atricola (Linds.) Sacc. & D.Sacc. (1905); Mycosphaerella cookei (Linds.) Sacc. & D.Sacc. (1905); Polycarpella cookei (Linds.) Theiss. & Syd. (1918); Sphaeria lichenicola Sommerf. (1826); Tichothecium erraticum subsp. microphorum (Nyl.) A.L.Sm. (1910); Tichothecium lichenicola (Sommerf.) R.Sant. (1960); Verrucaria microphora Nyl. (1863)

= Muellerella lichenicola =

Species of fungus

Muellerella lichenicola is a species of lichenicolous fungus in the family Verrucariaceae. It was first formally described as a new species in 1826 by Søren Christian Sommerfelt, as Sphaeria lichenicola. David Leslie Hawksworth transferred it to the genus Muellerella in 1979.

It has been reported growing on Caloplaca aurantia, Caloplaca saxicola and Physcia aipolia in Sicily, and on an unidentified crustose lichen in Iceland. In Mongolia, it has been reported growing on the thallus of a Biatora-lichen at 2,800 m (9,200 ft) elevation in the Bulgan district and on Aspicilia at 1,850 m (6,070 ft) elevation in the Altai district. In Victoria Land, Antarctica, it has been reported from multiple hosts, including members of the Teloschistaceae and Physciaceae.
