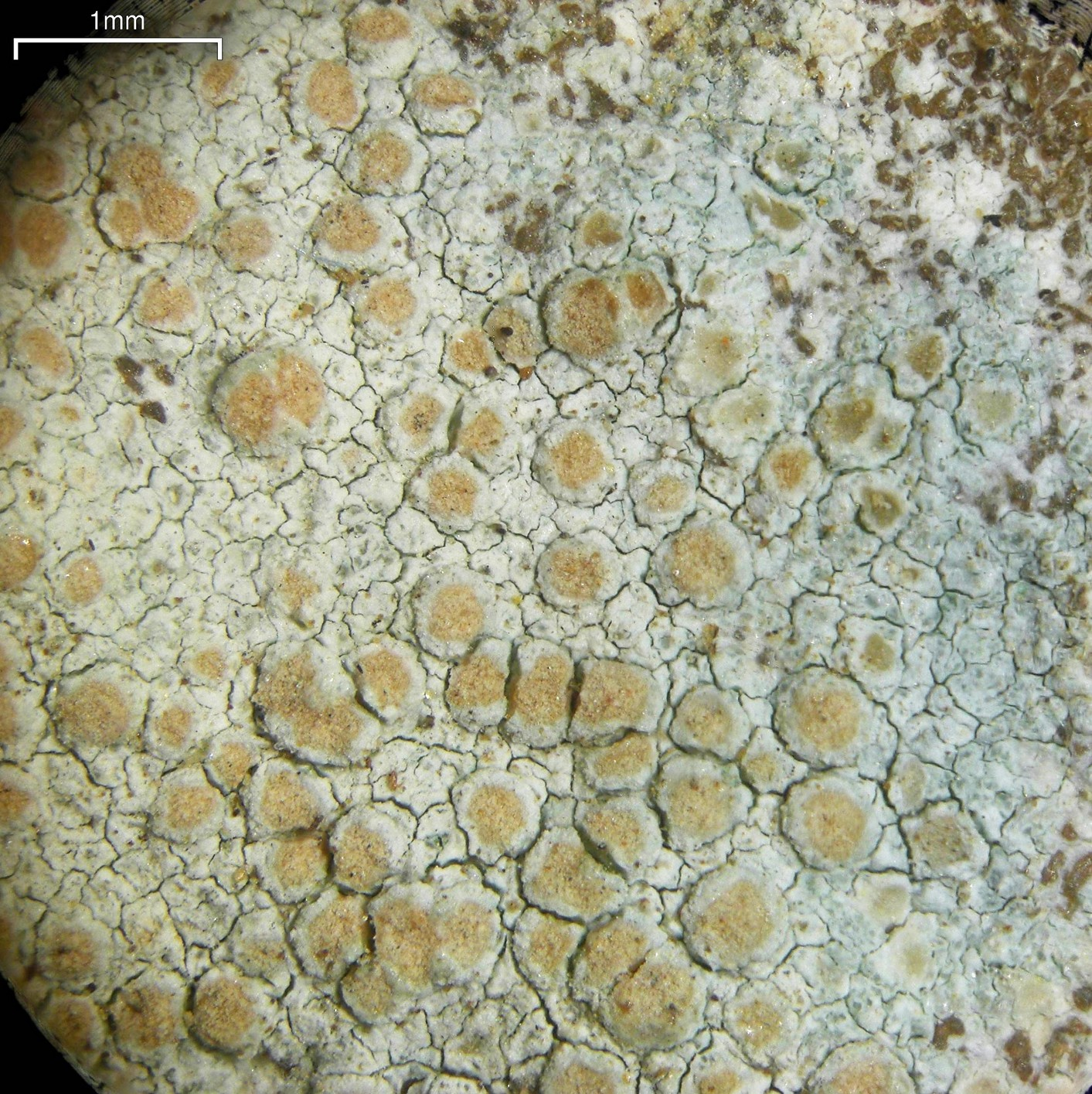

Conservation status
- Secure (NatureServe)

Scientific classification
- Kingdom: Fungi
- Division: Ascomycota
- Class: Lecanoromycetes
- Order: Lecanorales
- Family: Lecanoraceae
- Genus: Lecanora
- Species: L. cenisia

Binomial name
- Lecanora cenisia Ach. (1810)

Synonyms
- Parmelia cenisia (Ach.) Fr. (1831); Urceolaria cenisia (Ach.) Link (1833); Zeora cenisia (Ach.) Flot. (1849); Patellaria cenisia (Ach.) Trevis. (1852)

= Lecanora cenisia =

Species of crustose lichen

Lecanora cenisia is a species of crustose lichen in the family Lecanoraceae, first described by the Swedish lichenologist Erik Acharius in 1810 and named after Mont Cenis where it was discovered. The lichen forms a cream-white to pale grey granular thallus with distinctive red-brown to black (fruiting bodies) (apothecia) that feature persistent thalline margins containing conspicuous crystal clusters. It produces secondary metabolites including atranorin, chloroatranorin, and roccellic acid, which yield characteristic chemical reactions in spot tests. In the United Kingdom, it occurs locally on silica-rich rocks in shaded or sheltered crevices throughout Britain's upland areas and offshore islands, and serves as a host for the lichenicolous fungus Carbonea supersparsa.

== Taxonomy ==
Lecanora cenisia was first scientifically described by the Swedish lichenologist Erik Acharius in 1810. In his original Latin description, Acharius noted the species inhabits rocks on Mont Cenis ('Habitat ad rupes in monte Cenisio), which is alluded to in its specific epithet cenisia. At the end of the protologue, Acharius acknowledged it as a beautiful species (pulchra haec species) with a distinctive appearance compared to related taxa. He credited Cl. Molinero with discovering it, though he expressed uncertainty about where and under what name it had been previously published.

== Description ==
Lecanora cenisia forms a more or less continuous, granular crustose lichen thallus (the main body) or, alternatively, discrete warted areoles (small, cushion‑like sections) that may occur singly or in clusters. The thallus ranges from cream‑white to pale or yellowish grey, drying to blue‑grey or pale grey, with areoles that are broadly flat and edged by smooth to scalloped (crenate) margins. A white or bluish prothallus (the fibrous fungal growth margin) may be visible around the thallus, and no soredia (powdery vegetative propagules) are produced.

The apothecium (sexual fruiting body) is 1–2.5 mm in diameter, sessile on the thallus and often narrowed at the base so that it appears slightly raised. Each apothecium bears a persistent thalline margin—an outer rim of thallus‑derived tissue—that is entire to finely scalloped or gently wavy, and contains conspicuous clusters of crystals in its medulla. The disc varies in colour from red‑brown to black, yellowish brown, grey or green‑black, occasionally with a pale frost‑like (pruinose) coating.

Microscopically, the epithecium (the layer immediately above the hymenium) is brown to olive‑brown with coarse granules that dissolve and turn green in potassium hydroxide solution (K+) and give a purple‑red reaction in nitric acid (N+). The hymenium (spore‑bearing layer) is 60–90 micrometres (μm) tall, and the paraphyses (sterile filaments among the asci) are 1.5–2 μm across with slightly swollen, olive‑tinted tips. Each ascus measures about 45–50 by 7–9 μm and contains broadly ellipsoid ascospores that are typically 9–15 by 6–8.5 μm.

Chemical spot tests on the thallus are C–, K+ (yellow or yellow → red) and Pd+ (yellow or yellow → orange‑red), while showing no fluorescence under ultraviolet light (UV–). These reactions correspond to the presence of secondary metabolites such as atranorin, chloroatranorin, roccellic acid, and occasionally gangaleoidin, with variable traces of norstictic acid.

== Habitat and distribution ==
In the United Kingdom, Lecanora cenisia is a locally occurring species found on coarse, silica‑rich rocks—particularly in shaded or sheltered crevices—at both inland and coastal sites. It is recorded from the Channel and Scilly Islands and appears in scattered populations throughout Britain's upland areas.

Lecanora cenisiais a known host of the lichenicolous fungus species Carbonea supersparsa.

== See also ==
- List of Lecanora species
