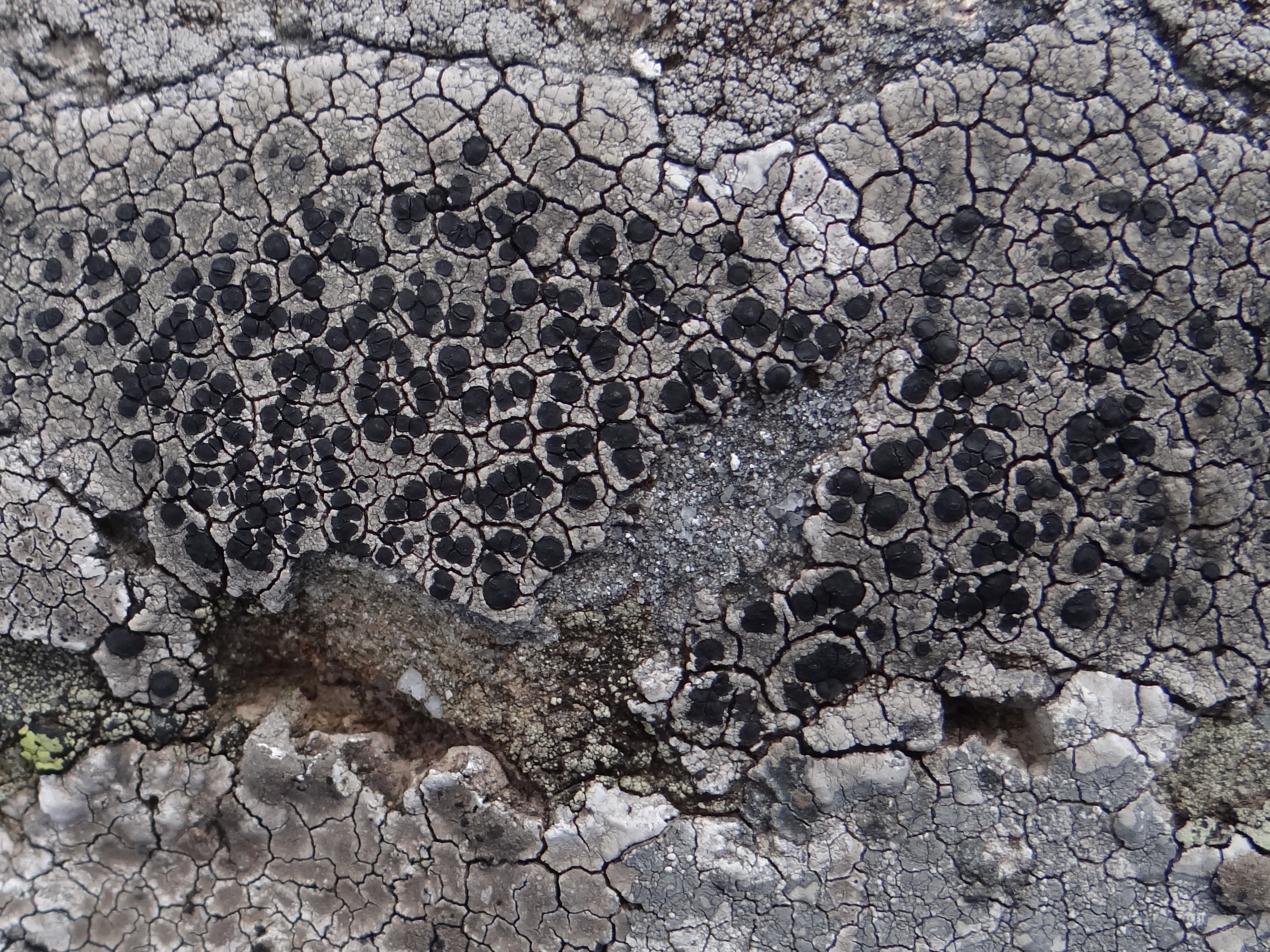

Scientific classification
- Domain: Eukaryota
- Kingdom: Fungi
- Division: Ascomycota
- Class: Lecanoromycetes
- Order: Lecideales
- Family: Lecideaceae
- Genus: Lecidea
- Species: L. lapicida

Binomial name
- Lecidea lapicida (Ach.) Ach. (1803)

Synonyms
- List: Lecidea austrogeorgica Müll.Arg.; Lecidea confluens var. ochromela Ach.; Lecidea contenebricans Nyl.; Lecidea contigua var. declinans (Nyl.) Boistel; Lecidea contigua var. declinascens (Nyl.) Boistel; Lecidea contigua var. lapicida (Ach.) Nyl.; Lecidea contigua var. ochromela Ach.) Mudd; Lecidea contigua var. ochromeliza (Nyl.) Boistel; Lecidea contigua var. variegata (Fr.); Lecidea contiguella Nyl.; Lecidea cyanescens Lynge; Lecidea darbishirei Zahlbr.; Lecidea declinans (Nyl.) Nyl.; Lecidea declinans f. ochromela (Ach.) Müll.Arg.; Lecidea declinascens Nyl.; Lecidea declinascens f. ochromeliza Nyl.; Lecidea dendroclinis Nyl.; Lecidea hoelii Lynge; Lecidea lapicida f. ochromela (Ach.) Vain.; Lecidea lapicida f. ochromeliza (Nyl.) Harm.; Lecidea lapicida f. oxydata Rabenh.; Lecidea lapicida subsp. lithophiloides Nyl.; Lecidea lapicida subsp. ochromela; Lecidea lapicida var. declinans Nyl.; Lecidea lapicida var. lithophiloides (Müll.Arg.) Cl.Roux; Lecidea lapicida var. maungahukae Hertel; Lecidea lapicida var. ochromela (Ach.) Nyl.; Lecidea lapicida var. theiodes (Sommerf.) Cl.Roux, 2014; Lecidea lapillicola Darb.; Lecidea lithophiloides Müll.Arg.; Lecidea metamorpha Anzi; Lecidea ochromela (Ach.) Anzi; Lecidea pantherina subsp. peralbida Th.Fr.; Lecidea pantherina var. achariana Vain.; Lecidea pantherina var. subauriculata Malme; Lecidea parasema var. lapicida (Ach.) Branth & Rostr.; Lecidea peralbida (Th.Fr.) H.Olivier; Lecidea polycarpa Flörke; Lecidea polycarpa var. declinans (Nyl.) Leight.; Lecidea pruinosula Magnusson; Lecidea rupicida Vain.; Lecidea scotoplaca Magnusson; Lecidea subinvoluta Müll.Arg.; Lecidea subkochiana Crombie; Lecidea subplanata Vain.; Lecidea subterluescens subsp. ochromeliza (Nyl.) Dalla Torre & Sarnth.; Lecidea swartzioidea var. lithophilioides (Müll.Arg.) Clauzade & Cl.Roux; Lecidea swartzioidea var. lithophiloides (Müll.Arg.) Clauzade & Cl.Roux; Lecidea theiodes Sommerf.; Lecidea variegata Fries; Lecidea vestrogothica H.Magn.; Lecidella lapicida (Ach.) Körb.; Lecidella lapicida f. oxydata (Rabenh.) Körb.; Lichen lapicida Ach.; Lichen peltatus subsp. lapicida (Ach.) Lam.; Patellaria lapicida (Ach.) Duby

= Lecidea lapicida =

Species of lichen

Lecidea lapicida is a species of lichen in the family Lecideaceae. It has a worldwide distribution but it is rare in the tropics.

Lecidea lapicida is a known host species to the lichenicolous fungus species Muellerella erratica, Muellerella pygmaea and Rhizocarpon furax.

== See also ==
- List of Lecidea species
