= Carbonea aggregantula =

Scientific classification
- Domain: Eukaryota
- Kingdom: Fungi
- Division: Ascomycota
- Class: Lecanoromycetes
- Order: Lecanorales
- Family: Lecanoraceae
- Genus: Carbonea
- Species: C. aggregantula

Binomial name
- Carbonea aggregantula (Müll.Arg.) Diederich & Triebel (2003)

Synonyms
- Lecidea aggregantula Müll.Arg. (1874); Nesolechia aggregantula (Müll.Arg.) Rehm (1890); Carbonea aggregantula (Müll.Arg.) Diederich & Triebel (1993)

Species of fungus

Carbonea aggregantula is a species of lichenicolous (lichen-dwelling) fungus belonging to the family Lecanoraceae.

It is a lichenicolous fungus, meaning that it grows on other lichens, but it does not cause obvious symptoms of infection, unlike the similar Carbonea austroshetlandica.

== Distribution ==
Carbonea aggregantula is widely distributed. Although it has not been reported often, its distribution includes multiple continents. Carbonea aggregantula has been reported from some of the subantarctic islands, including King George Island, Penguin Island and Livingston Island.

== Host species ==
Carbonea aggregantula has a wide range of host species which are still being discovered. Known hosts are:

- Candelariella sp.
- Lecanora alpigena
- Lecanora impudens
- Lecanora leproplaca
- Lecanora leucococca
- Lecanora polytropa
- Lecanora subaurea
- Lecanora subgranulata
- Protoparmeliopsis muralis
- Rhizoplaca aspidophora (synonym of Lecanora aspidophora)
