= Carbonea assentiens =

Scientific classification
- Domain: Eukaryota
- Kingdom: Fungi
- Division: Ascomycota
- Class: Lecanoromycetes
- Order: Lecanorales
- Family: Lecanoraceae
- Genus: Carbonea
- Species: C. assentiens

Binomial name
- Carbonea assentiens (Nyl.) Hertel (1984)

Synonyms
- Lecidea assentiens Nyl. (1873); Lecidea aubertii B.de Lesd. (1931)

Species of lichen

Carbonea assentiens is a species of lichen belonging to the family Lecanoraceae. It is found in Antarctica and in the islands of the subantarctic.

It is parasitized by the lichenicolous fungi species Carbonea austroshetlandica and Muellerella pygmaea.
