= Muellerella lecanactidis =

Scientific classification
- Kingdom: Fungi
- Division: Ascomycota
- Class: Eurotiomycetes
- Order: Verrucariales
- Family: Verrucariaceae
- Genus: Muellerella
- Species: M. lecanactidis

Binomial name
- Muellerella lecanactidis Diederich & van den Boom (2003)

Species of lichen

Muellerella lecanactidis is a species of lichenicolous (lichen-dwelling) fungus in the family Verrucariaceae. It was formally described as a new species in 2003 by Paul Diederich and Pieter van den Boom, from specimens collected in California. The authors thought that the type specimen was parasitising a lichen from genus Lecanactis, hence the species epithet, but it was later discovered that the host was actually Sigridea californica.
