= Muellerella thalamita =

Scientific classification
- Domain: Eukaryota
- Kingdom: Fungi
- Division: Ascomycota
- Class: Eurotiomycetes
- Order: Verrucariales
- Family: Verrucariaceae
- Genus: Muellerella
- Species: M. thalamita

Binomial name
- Muellerella thalamita (Nyl. ex Cromb.) D.Hawksw., F.Berger & LaGreca (2014)

Synonyms
- Endococcus thalamita Nyl. (1877)

Species of fungus

Muellerella thalamita is a species of lichenicolous fungus in the family Verrucariaceae. It grows on the apothecia of Orcularia insperata, Baculifera micromera and Hafellia disciformis, which are lichens that grow on bark.
