= Rhizocarpon furax =

Scientific classification
- Kingdom: Fungi
- Division: Ascomycota
- Class: Lecanoromycetes
- Order: Rhizocarpales
- Family: Rhizocarpaceae
- Genus: Rhizocarpon
- Species: R. furax

Binomial name
- Rhizocarpon furax Poelt & V.Wirth, 1970

Species of lichen

Rhizocarpon furax is a species of lichen in the family Rhizocarpaceae. It is found in Europe, where it has a scattered distribution.

Rhizocarpon furax is a lichenicolous fungi, meaning that it grows on the thallus of other lichens. It was originally reported from Lecidea swartzioidea but has since been reported growing on Lecidea lapicida and Tremolecia atrata.

== See also ==
- List of Lecidea species
