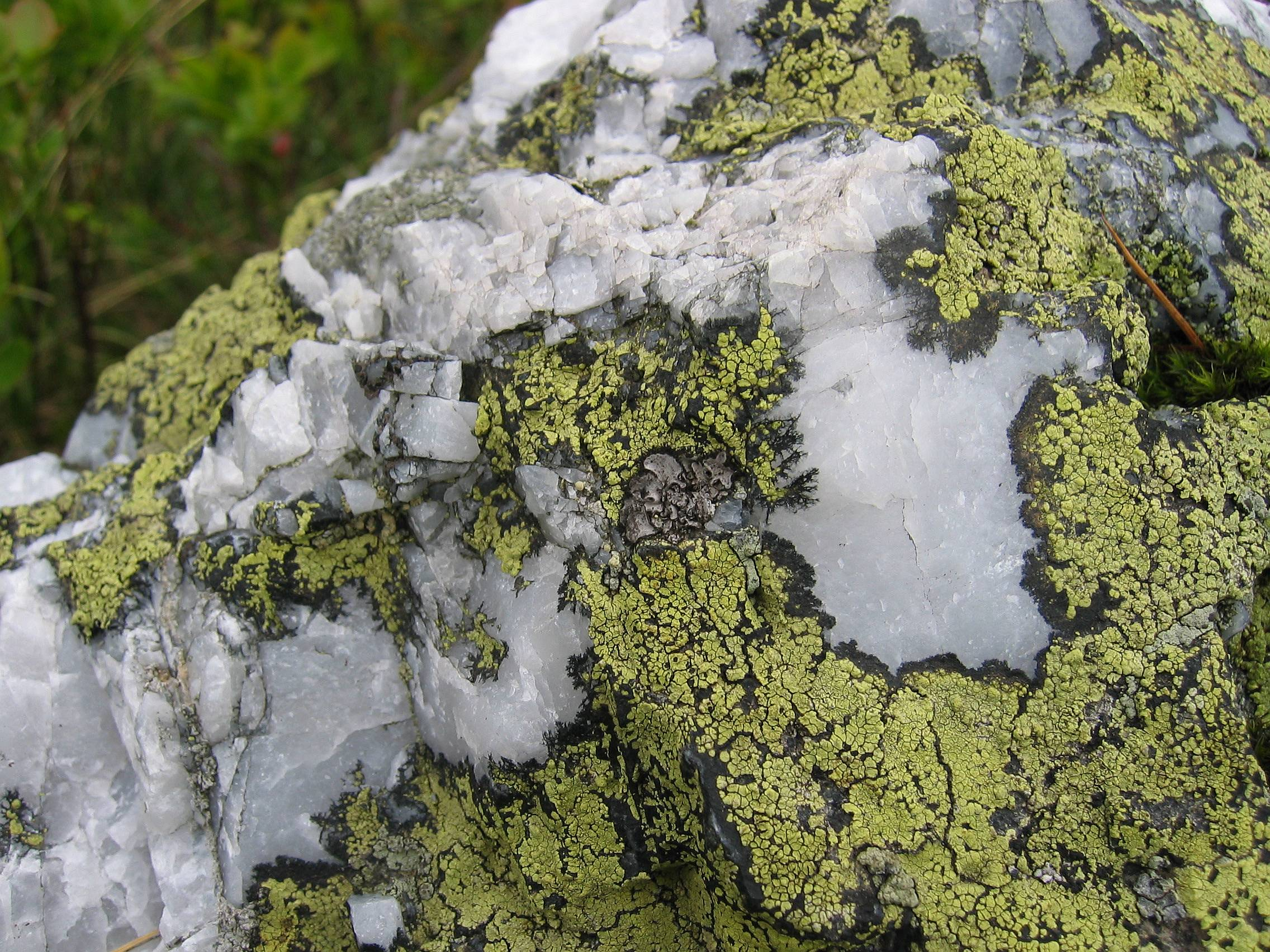

Conservation status
- Secure (NatureServe)

Scientific classification
- Kingdom: Fungi
- Division: Ascomycota
- Class: Lecanoromycetes
- Order: Rhizocarpales
- Family: Rhizocarpaceae
- Genus: Rhizocarpon
- Species: R. geographicum

Binomial name
- Rhizocarpon geographicum (L.) DC. (1805)

= Rhizocarpon geographicum =

Species of lichen-forming fungus

Rhizocarpon geographicum (the map lichen or yellow map lichen) is a species of lichen, which grows on rocks in mountainous areas of low air pollution. Each lichen is a flat patch bordered by a black line of fungal hyphae. These patches grow adjacent to each other, leading to the appearance of a map or a patchwork field.

When circular, or roughly circular, the diameter of this lichen species has been widely used to help determining the relative age of deposits, e.g. moraine systems, thus revealing evidence of glacial advances. The process is termed lichenometry.

== Taxonomy ==
Rhizocarpon geographicum was first described by Carl Linnaeus in 1753 as Lichen geographicus, which he characterised as forming yellow patches divided by black lines so that the rock surface resembled a map. In 1805 Augustin Pyramus de Candolle, in a work co-authored with Jean-Baptiste Lamarck, transferred the species to their new genus Rhizocarpon, describing a very thin black crust on the rock that bears distinct yellow-green "scales" (écailles), corresponding to what are now regarded as the areoles of the thallus, together with flat, matte-black apothecia edged by a slight rim. They treated forms such as Lichen atrovirens and Verrucaria geographica as age variants of the same species, which they named Rhizocarpe géographique (Rhizocarpon geographicum).

It is the type species of Rhizocarpon, a genus of crustose rock-dwelling lichens in the family Rhizocarpaceae, which also includes Catolechia, Epilichen and Poeltinula. Because no original material referable to Lichen geographicus survives in the Linnaean Herbarium, modern authors have stabilised the name using Dillenian material: an illustration in Johann Jacob Dillenius's Historia Muscorum that Linnaeus cited has been designated as the lectotype, and a corresponding specimen in the Oxford herbarium serves as an epitype that fixes the current application of the name.

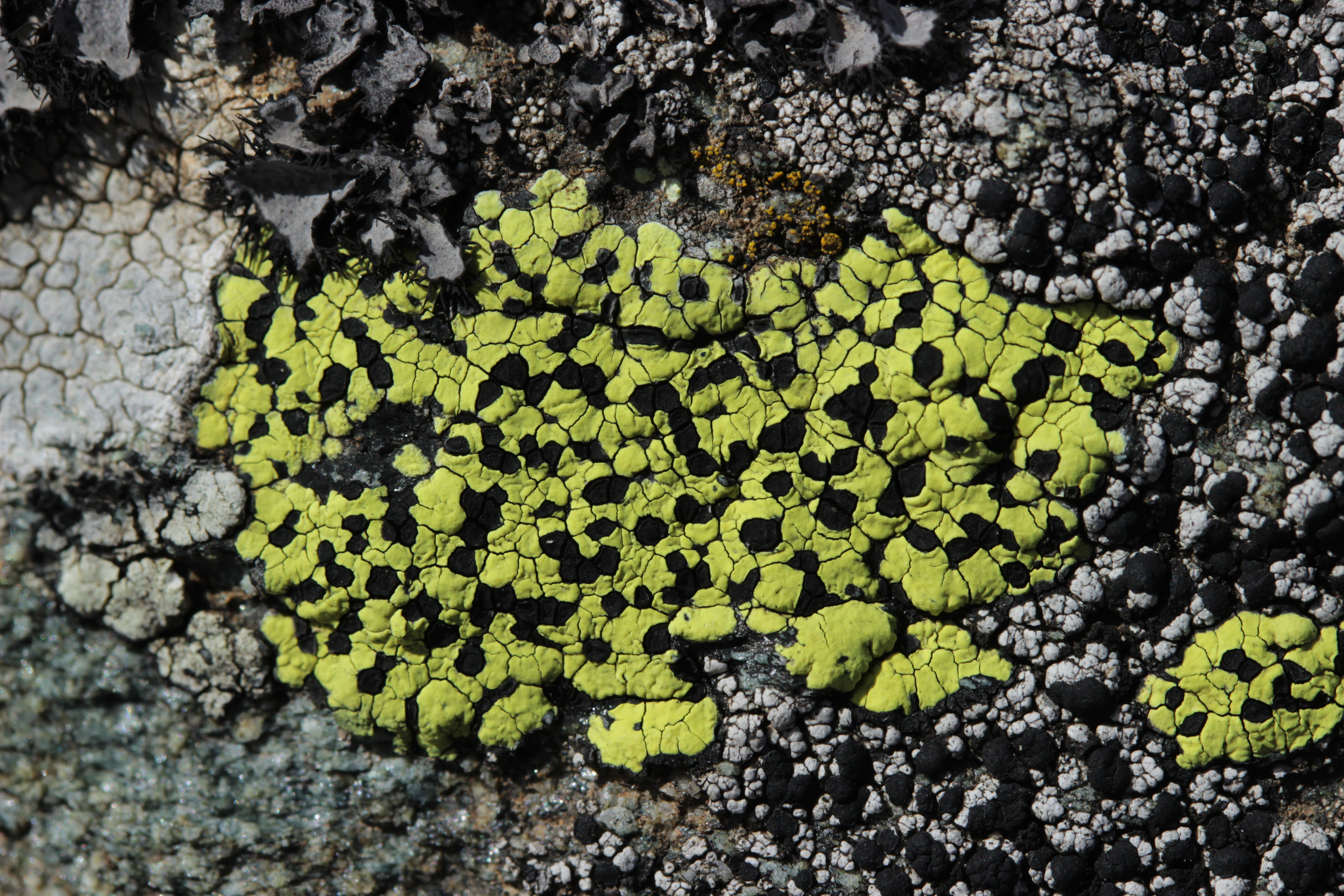
In Zermatt, Switzerland

Study of this epitype shows the character combination that now defines the species. The lichen forms a yellow-green crust with a black prothallus, and its medulla reacts blue-green with iodine. The apothecia have colourless asci and brown, muriform ascospores divided into eight cells and measuring about 32 × 12 μm. Microchemical tests and later thin-layer chromatography have shown that the type material contains rhizocarpic and psoromic acids, together with a minor amount of 2'-O-demethylpsoromic acid. These features are used to separate R. geographicum from other yellow members of the genus that may look similar in the field.

The species gives its name to the R. geographicum species complex, a complex of yellow-green Rhizocarpon species characterised by the presence of rhizocarpic acid, a medulla that reacts blue-violet with iodine, an epithecium lacking dark granules, and muriform ascospores. About 26 species are recognised in this group, and no fewer than 95 infraspecific names have been published under R. geographicum alone, reflecting long-recognised variation within the complex and the difficulty of defining species limits. Recent work combining type studies, broader morphological sampling and DNA sequence data has shown that the yellow species of Rhizocarpon are polyphyletic (not descendant from a single ancestor) and that several characters traditionally used in keys—such as certain K and Pd spot test reactions and the presence of collar-like areoles around the apothecia—are inconsistent or misleading. As a result, the R. geographicum complex and the traditional subdivision of the genus into yellow and non-yellow groups are being re-evaluated in the light of modern phylogenetic analyses.

== Description ==
The thallus of Rhizocarpon geographicum can form extensive patches up to about 15 cm across. It is usually sharply delimited by a well-developed black prothallus, within which the surface is broken into small angular areoles. These areoles are typically 0.2–1.8 mm across (occasionally to 2.5 mm), and range in colour from pale to vivid yellow-green; in some montane populations they may show a slight orange tint. The areoles are usually tightly packed, though they can be more sparsely scattered on the black ground layer, and their surface is flat to gently convex, more rarely slightly concave, and generally smooth. The internal white medulla gives a blue staining reaction with iodine, indicating the presence of amyloid polysaccharides.

The sexual structures are small black apothecia, usually less than 1.5 mm in diameter, which sit on the areoles and are round to somewhat angular. Their discs are flat to slightly convex, lack any surface pruina, and are surrounded by a thick to only weakly developed margin. In section, the outer rim of the exciple is dark brown while the inner part is paler and typically turns purple-red with potassium hydroxide solution; the uppermost tissue (epithecium) is red-brown, brown or olive-green. The ascospores are dark brown, muriform, and relatively large (about 20–50 × 10–20 μm), with numerous internal cells visible in optical section. The medulla usually gives a Pd+ (yellow) reaction, indicating the presence of rhizocarpic acid together with either psoromic or barbatic acids. Some chemotypes instead lack these reactions or contain other minor substances such as bourgeanic or low amounts of gyrophoric acid.

== Distribution ==
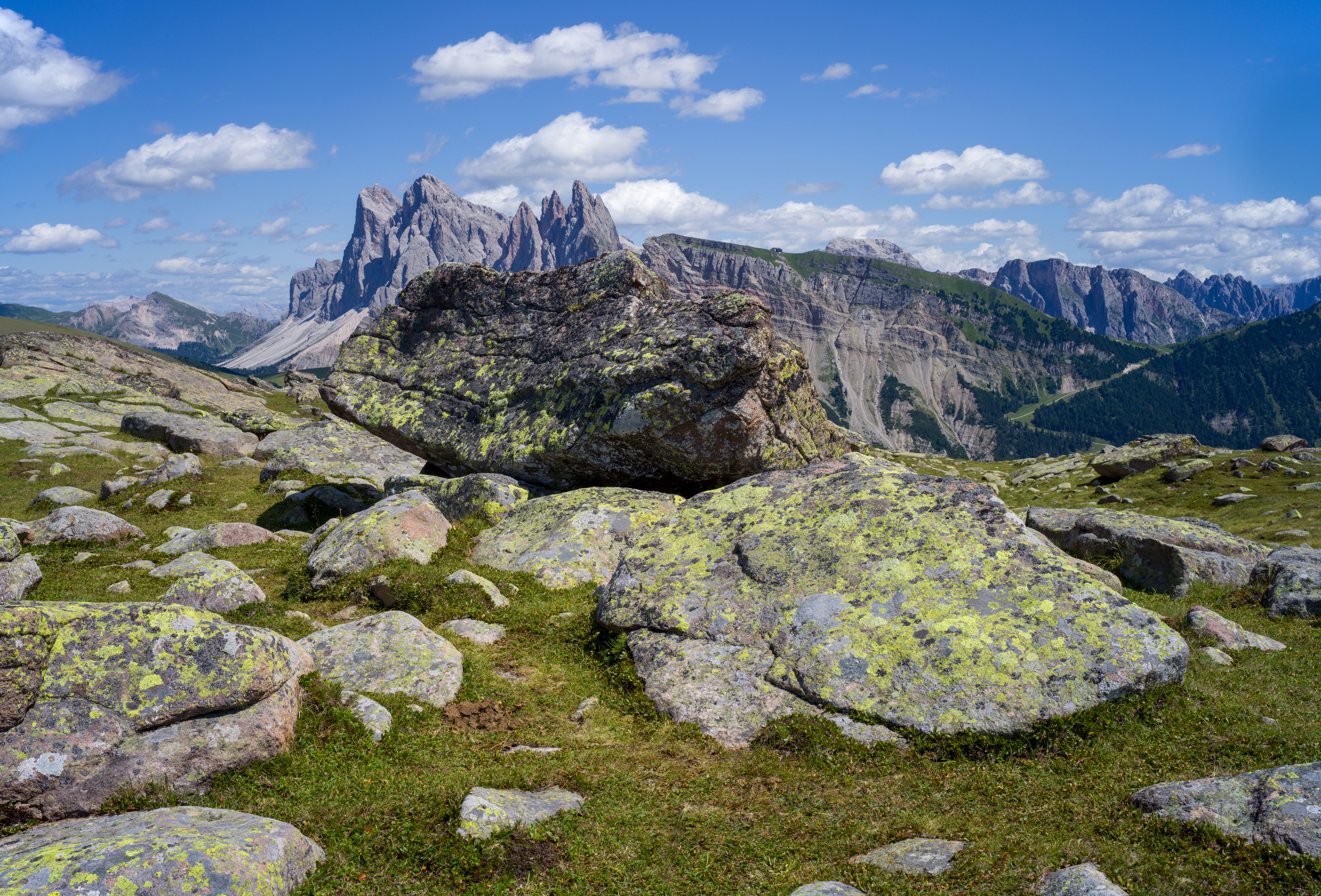
Rhizocarpon geographicum is a prominent member of the saxicolous lichen community growing on these rocks in the Puez-Geisler Nature Park in South Tyrol, Italy.

This lichen species is broadly distributed and may be found in most cold areas with exposed rock surfaces. The North American range includes the Sierra Nevada and northern boreal forests of Canada, Greenland, Iceland, Fennoscandia and Siberia. In the tropics it only occurs at high altitudes such as the Andes of Peru and Colombia. Further south the map lichen is found broadly across Patagonia, in the Falkland Islands, the sub Antarctic islands and the Antarctic Peninsula.

In Britain it can be found commonly growing on hard siliceous rocks, especially in upland regions. Its range covers virtually all of Scotland, much of North West England, and other upland areas in much of the rest of England, Wales and Ireland too.

In Spain it is found primarily in siliceous mountain ranges, although occasionally it can be found near sea level, even in southern Spain, where it is known from Cabo de Gata.

== Ecology ==
Rhizocarpon geographicum is a known host to the lichenicolous fungus species Muellerella pygmaea.

== Life span ==
One specimen of Rhizocarpon geographicum on East Baffin Island has an estimated age of 9500 years. Thalli of Rhizocarpon geographicum in the central Brooks Range of northern Alaska have been given a maximum possible age of 10,000–11,500 years.

== Outer space ==
In an experiment, this lichen species was placed in a capsule and launched into space. The capsule was opened, exposing the lichen to space conditions for 10 days before being brought back down to Earth, where it showed minimal changes or damage.

== See also ==
- Extremophile
- List of lichens named by Carl Linnaeus
