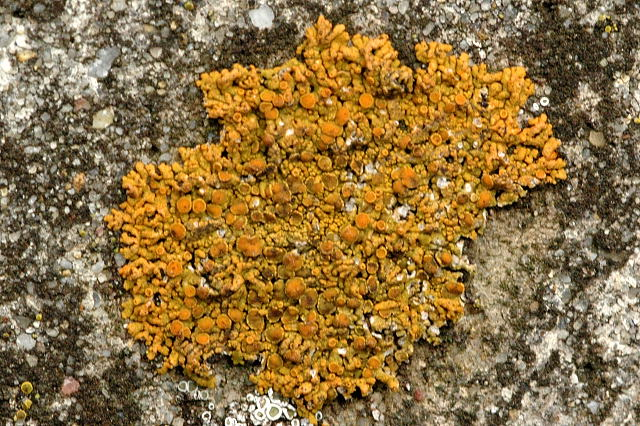

Conservation status
- Secure (NatureServe)

Scientific classification
- Domain: Eukaryota
- Kingdom: Fungi
- Division: Ascomycota
- Class: Lecanoromycetes
- Order: Teloschistales
- Family: Teloschistaceae
- Genus: Caloplaca
- Species: C. saxicola

Binomial name
- Caloplaca saxicola (Hoffm.) Nordin

Synonyms
- Psora saxicola Hoffm.

= Caloplaca saxicola =

Species of lichen

Caloplaca saxicola is a small bright orange crustose lichen that grows on rock all over the world. It is commonly called rock firedot lichen, jewel lichen or rock jewel lichen.

It has short, inflated looking elongate 1–2 mm and .3-.1 mm wide lobes that have an abrupt margin at the edge, and no prothallus. It lacks isidia or soredia. Apothecia may be immersed in the thallus or adnate to it, with rims of thallus-like tissue (lecanorine) with orange, flat, .4–1 mm wide epruinose discs. Aptohecia develop near the lobe tips. C. ignea and C. impolita are similar but bigger, and have apothecia that form near the thallus center.

In California, it is one of the most common saxicolous lichens. This lichen occurs over a portion of northern North America. A specific example occurrence is within the northern reaches of the Canadian Boreal forests, where Black Spruce is a dominant tree.

== See also ==
- List of Caloplaca species
