= Muellerella antarctica =

Scientific classification
- Domain: Eukaryota
- Kingdom: Fungi
- Division: Ascomycota
- Class: Eurotiomycetes
- Order: Verrucariales
- Family: Verrucariaceae
- Genus: Muellerella
- Species: M. antarctica

Binomial name
- Muellerella antarctica Etayo (2008)

Species of fungus

Muellerella antarctica is a species of lichenicolous fungus in the family Verrucariaceae. It was discovered in 2008 on Isla Navarino in Chile where it parasitised Hypogymnia antarctica.
