= Carbonea supersparsa =

Scientific classification
- Domain: Eukaryota
- Kingdom: Fungi
- Division: Ascomycota
- Class: Lecanoromycetes
- Order: Lecanorales
- Family: Lecanoraceae
- Genus: Carbonea
- Species: C. supersparsa

Binomial name
- Carbonea supersparsa (Nyl.) Hertel (1983)

Synonyms
- Lecidea supersparsa Nyl. (1865); Nesolechia supersparsa (Nyl.) Rehm (1890)

Species of fungus

Carbonea supersparsa is a species of lichenicolous fungus belonging to the family Lecanoraceae. It is widespread in the Northern Hemisphere. In Iceland it has been reported growing on Lecanora cenisia near Egilsstaðir and Lecanora polytropa near Seyðisfjörður.
