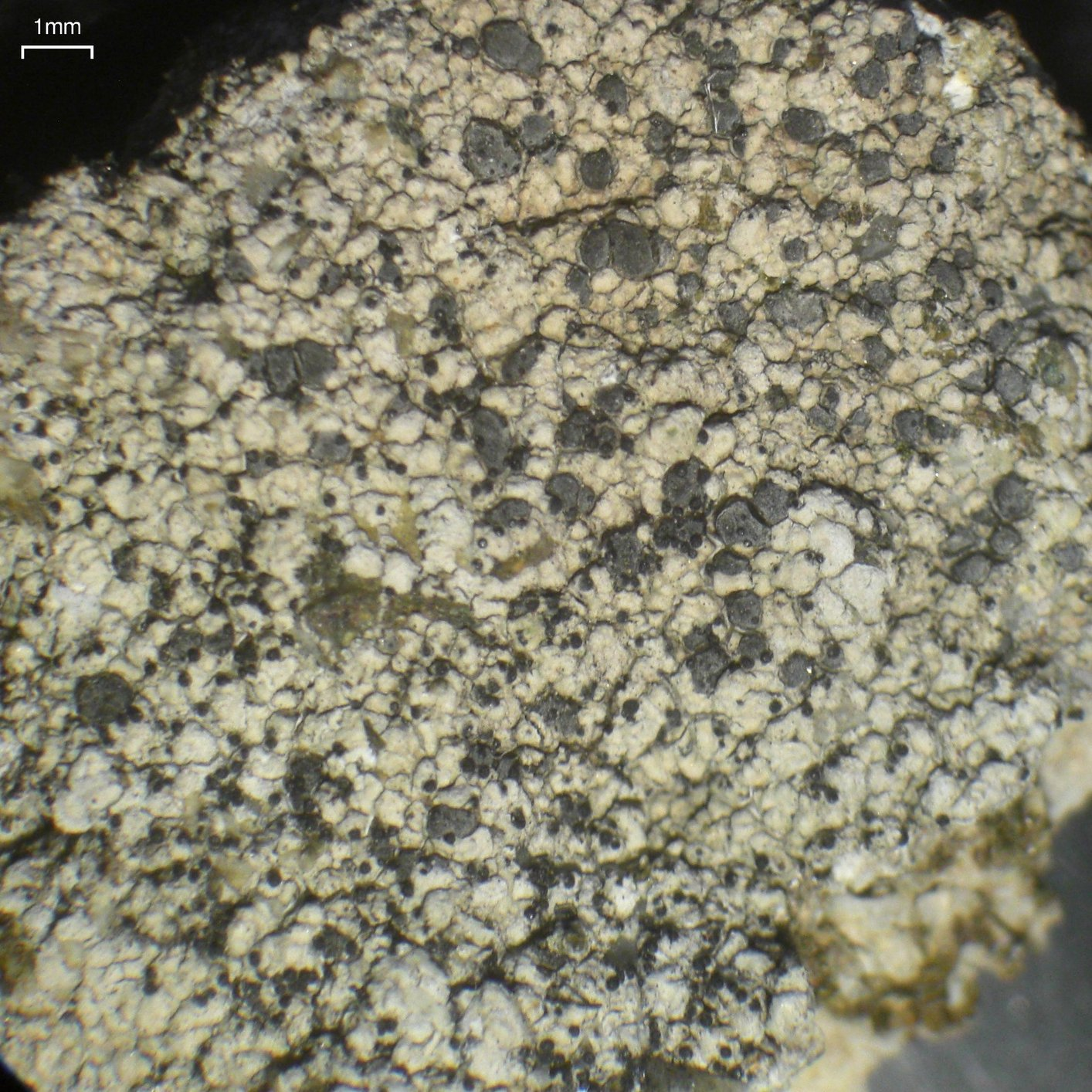

Scientific classification
- Kingdom: Fungi
- Division: Ascomycota
- Class: Eurotiomycetes
- Order: Verrucariales
- Family: Verrucariaceae
- Genus: Muellerella
- Species: M. pygmaea

Binomial name
- Muellerella pygmaea (Körb.) D.Hawksw. (1979)

Synonyms
- Mycoporum pygmaeum (Körb.) Jatta; Tichothecium pygmaeum var. ecatonosporum Anzi & G. Winter; Microthelia ecatonospora Anzi; Microthelia pygmaea Körb.; Tichothecium pygmaeum (Körb.) Körb.; Sychnogonia pygmaea (Körb.) Trevis.; Endococcus pygmaeus (Körb.) Th. Fr.; Tichothecium sporastatiae Anzi; Pyrenula pygmaea (Körb.) Tuck.

= Muellerella pygmaea =

Species of fungus

Muellerella pygmaea is a species of lichenicolous fungus in the family Verrucariaceae. It has a cosmopolitan distribution in Arctic-alpine areas and grows on the thallus and apothecia of a number of hosts.

Host species for Muellerella pygmaea include:

- Acarospora sp.
- Acarospora smaragdula
- Aspicilia calcarea
- Candelariella aurella
- Carbonea assentiens
- Lecanora alpigena
- Lecanora muralis
- Lecanora polytropa
- Lecidea grisella
- Lecidea lapicida
- Lecidea obluridata
- Tephromela atra
- Rhizocarpon geographicum
- Rhizocarpon superficiale
- Rusavskia elegans
