= Carbonea hypopurpurea =

Scientific classification
- Kingdom: Fungi
- Division: Ascomycota
- Class: Lecanoromycetes
- Order: Lecanorales
- Family: Lecanoraceae
- Genus: Carbonea
- Species: C. hypopurpurea

Binomial name
- Carbonea hypopurpurea Fryday (2012)

Species of lichen

Carbonea hypopurpurea is a species of saxicolous (rock-dwelling) crustose lichen in the family Lecanoraceae. Found on the Falkland Islands, it was described as a new species in 2012 by Alan Fryday. It is characterised by a K+ (purple) hypothecium and a thallus containing confluentic and 2'-O-methylperlatolic acids.
