= Lucyna Śliwa =

Polish lichenologist and mycologist (born 1964)

Lucyna Elżbieta Śliwa
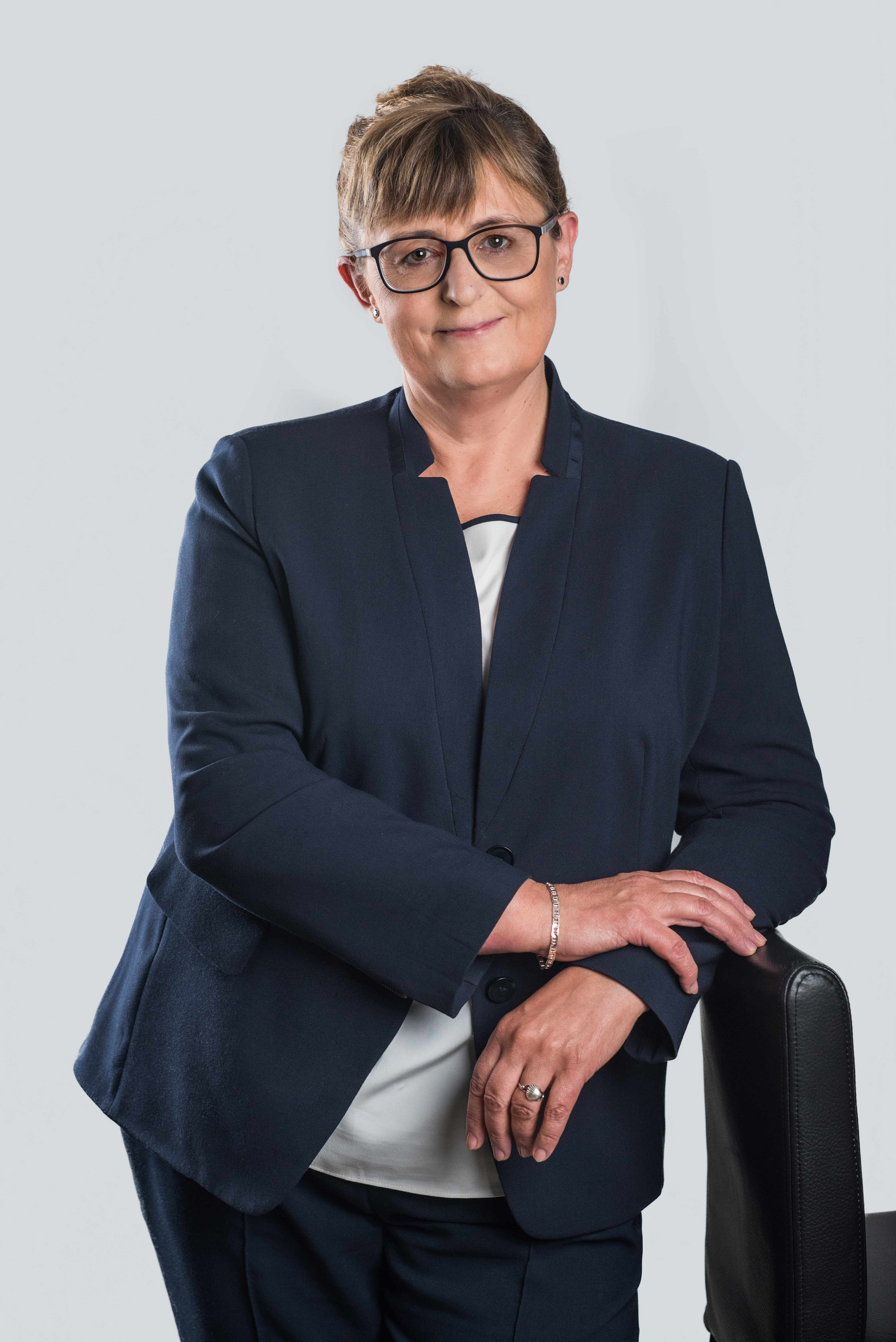
- Born: 20 February 1964 (age 62); Rzeszów, Poland
- Education: Jagiellonian University
- Awards: Golden Cross of Merit
- Scientific career
- Fields: Mycology, lichenology
- Workplaces: Władysław Szafer Institute of Botany
- Author abbrev. (botany): Śliwa

Lucyna Elżbieta Śliwa (born 20 February 1964) is a Polish lichenologist and mycologist known for her extensive work on the taxonomy and biogeography of the lichen genus Lecanora. She is currently the head of the Władysław Szafer Institute of Botany at the Polish Academy of Sciences, where she has made significant contributions to the understanding of lichen biodiversity and the impact of anthropogenic factors on lichen biota, particularly in the Polish Carpathian Mountains.

== Early life and education ==
Śliwa was born on 20 February 1964 in Rzeszów, Poland. In 1982, she moved to Kraków to pursue her higher education at the Jagiellonian University. She graduated with a master's degree in biology from the Faculty of Biology in 1987.

== Research ==
Śliwa began her scientific career as a technical assistant at the Institute of Botany, Jagiellonian University, from 1986 to 1988. Her early research focused on the lichens of Rzeszów and the impact of urban environments on lichen populations. In 1991, she published her first paper on the application of transplantation methods in studying the influence of urban environments on lichen vitality. After receiving a Kosciuszko Foundation scholarship, Śliwa completed an internship at the University of Minnesota in 1991, collaborating with the renowned lichenologist Clifford M. Wetmore. This experience significantly influenced her subsequent research trajectory.

Śliwa's doctoral research, supervised by Maria Olech, focused on investigating anthropogenic changes in the lichen biota of the Beskid Sądecki mountain range. She received her doctoral title in biological sciences in 1996. From 2001, Śliwa's research increasingly focused on the taxonomy and biogeography of the genus Lecanora, particularly the Lecanora varia and Lecanora dispersa groups. A post-doctoral internship at the University of Minnesota (2001–2002) allowed her to study the Lecanora dispersa complex from North and Central America.

Throughout her career, Śliwa has led or participated in numerous research projects, including:

- "Taxonomy and Ecology of the Genus Lecanora in Antarctica" (2000–2002)
- "Lichen Flora of the Greatest Sonoran Desert Region" (2000–2004)
- "Taxonomic Differentiation of the Lecanora dispersa Group in North America" (2004–2006)
- "Molecular Patterns within the Lecanora dispersa Group in Poland" (2007–2009)
- "Biological Diversity of Tropical South America: Bolivian Lichens – A Case Study" (2010–2013)

Her research has resulted in the description of several new taxa, including Lecanora varia subsp. laxa, L. varia subsp. densa, L. carlottiana, L. juniperina, and L. wetmorei. Śliwa has also proposed new nomenclatural combinations and contributed significantly to the understanding of lichen diversity and distribution in various regions, including Russia, Antarctica, Argentina, Bolivia, and Romania.

== Academic positions and achievements ==
Śliwa held the position of assistant professor at the Jagiellonian University from 2001 before moving to the W. Szafer Institute of Botany of the Polish Academy of Sciences in Kraków in 2003. She obtained her habilitation in biological sciences, specialising in lichenology and taxonomy of lichenised fungi, in 2008.

In 2014, Śliwa was conferred the title of professor by the President of Poland. Since 2019, she has served as the head of the W. Szafer Institute of Botany of the Polish Academy of Sciences, where she has been instrumental in maintaining the institute's high standing in the scientific community and leading development projects. In March 2023, following a competitive selection process, Śliwa was reappointed as director of the Institute for another four-year term, running until March 2027. This coincides with the institute's 70th anniversary, and, under her leadership, the institute, which employs 45 scientists, has undergone recent reorganisation to further its scientific goals.

== Professional memberships and roles ==
Śliwa is a member of several scientific societies, including:

- International Association for Lichenology (IAL)
- Polish Botanical Society – Lichenological Section
- American Bryological and Lichenological Society
- Polish Mycological Society

She has served on the IAL's Nominating Committee (2008–2012) and has been a long-standing member of the Lichenological Section of the Polish Botanical Society, serving on its executive committee. Śliwa is also a member of the editorial boards for several scientific journals, including Fragmenta Floristica et Geobotanica Polonica, Monographie Botanicae, Plant and Fungal Systematics, and Studia Nature.

== Awards and honours ==
Śliwa has received several awards and honours during her career. The Jagiellonian University granted her the Rector's Award for her doctoral dissertation in 1998. In 2015, she was awarded the Golden Cross of Merit (Polish: Złoty Krzyż Zasługi), a Polish state decoration for exemplary public service.

In 2024, a newly discovered lichen species, Wetmoreana sliwae, was named in her honour by colleagues in recognition of her contributions to lichenology.

== Personal life ==
Śliwa is married with two children and is a grandmother. She is known among her colleagues for her energy, passion for lichenology, and willingness to assist other researchers in the field.

== Selected publications ==
- Śliwa, Lucyna; Wetmore, Clifford M. (2000). "Notes on the Lecanora varia Group in North America". The Bryologist. 103 (3): 475–492. doi:10.1639/0007-2745(2000)103[0475:NOTLVG]2.0.CO;2.
- Krzewicka, Beata; Smykla, Jerzy; Galas, Joanna; Śliwa, Lucyna (2017). "Freshwater lichens and habitat zonation of mountain streams". Limnologica. 63: 1–10. Bibcode:2017Limng..63....1K. doi:10.1016/j.limno.2016.12.002.
- Wołowski, Konrad; Spisak, Wojciech; Chlebicki, Andrzej; Szar, Mateusz; Kozak, Jarosław; Śliwa, Lucyna (2022). "Two-phase medium – a new approach to microbiological culturing". Cryptogamie, Algologie. 43 (5). doi:10.5252/cryptogamie-algologie2022v43a5.
- Szczepańska, Katarzyna; Rodriguez-Flakus, Pamela; Urbaniak, Jacek; Śliwa, Lucyna (2019). "Neotypification of Protoparmeliopsis garovaglii and molecular evidence of its occurrence in Poland and South America". MycoKeys (57): 31–46. doi:10.3897/mycokeys.57.34501. PMC 6687669. PMID 31410084.
