= Epilichen =

Scientific classification
- Domain: Eukaryota
- Kingdom: Fungi
- Division: Ascomycota
- Class: Lecanoromycetes
- Order: Rhizocarpales
- Family: Rhizocarpaceae
- Genus: Epilichen; Clem. (1909)

Type species
- Epilichen scabrosus (Ach.) Clem. (1909)

Species
- E. glauconigellus E. scabrosus E. stellatus

Genus of lichen-forming fungi

Epilichen is a small genus of lichen-forming fungi in the family Rhizocarpaceae. These parasitic lichens live on other lichens, beginning as thin, crust-like patches that may break into small islands or scales, and in some cases produce no visible body at all except for their reproductive structures. They reproduce through black, disc-shaped fruiting bodies that contain distinctive brown spores with a "doughnut ring" appearance, and can eventually take over the space occupied by their host lichen once it dies.

== Taxonomy ==
The genus was proposed by the American ecologist Frederic Clements in 1909, with E. scabrosus assigned as the type species. Clements originally classified the genus in the family Patellariaceae.

== Description ==
Epilichen species parasitise other lichens and begin as thin, crust-like patches (crustose thalli) that may fracture into island-like areoles or develop minute scales (subsquamulose lobes). In some cases the lichen produces no visible thallus at all, emerging only as reproductive bodies on its host. A distinct prothallus (border of fungal hyphae) and a protective outer skin (cortex) are both absent, and the genus lacks the powdery or bud-like outgrowths (soralia and isidia) that many lichens use for asexual spread. The photosynthetic partner is always a green alga with rounded cells (a chlorococcoid photobiont).

Sexual reproduction occurs in black, disc-shaped apothecia that lack a thalline margin, so the only border is the true exciple, a dark, compact ring of fungal tissue. A thin brown epithecium coats the top of the hymenium, while a thick, dark-brown hypothecium lies beneath. Threads called paraphysoids weave through the hymenium, branching and re-joining to form a loose net but seldom swelling at the tips. The asci are long, club-shaped sacs; when treated with potassium iodide solution they turn blue (K/I+), a diagnostic amyloid reaction caused by the tholus (the thickened apex) and the surrounding gelatine. Each ascus releases brown ascospores divided by a single wall; a torus-shaped thickening encircles the septum, giving the spores a distinctive "doughnut ring" appearance. No asexual pycnidia have been observed in the genus. Chemically, the genus contains two pulvinic acid pigments that lend yellow tones, along with several unidentified secondary metabolites. Although Epilichen is obligately lichenicolous, it may form its own independent thallus once the host lichen's fungal partner dies, effectively inheriting the space it first exploited.

== Species ==
- Epilichen glauconigellus (Nyl.) Hafellner (1979)
- Epilichen scabrosus (Ach.) Clem. (1909)
- Epilichen stellatus Triebel (1989)
