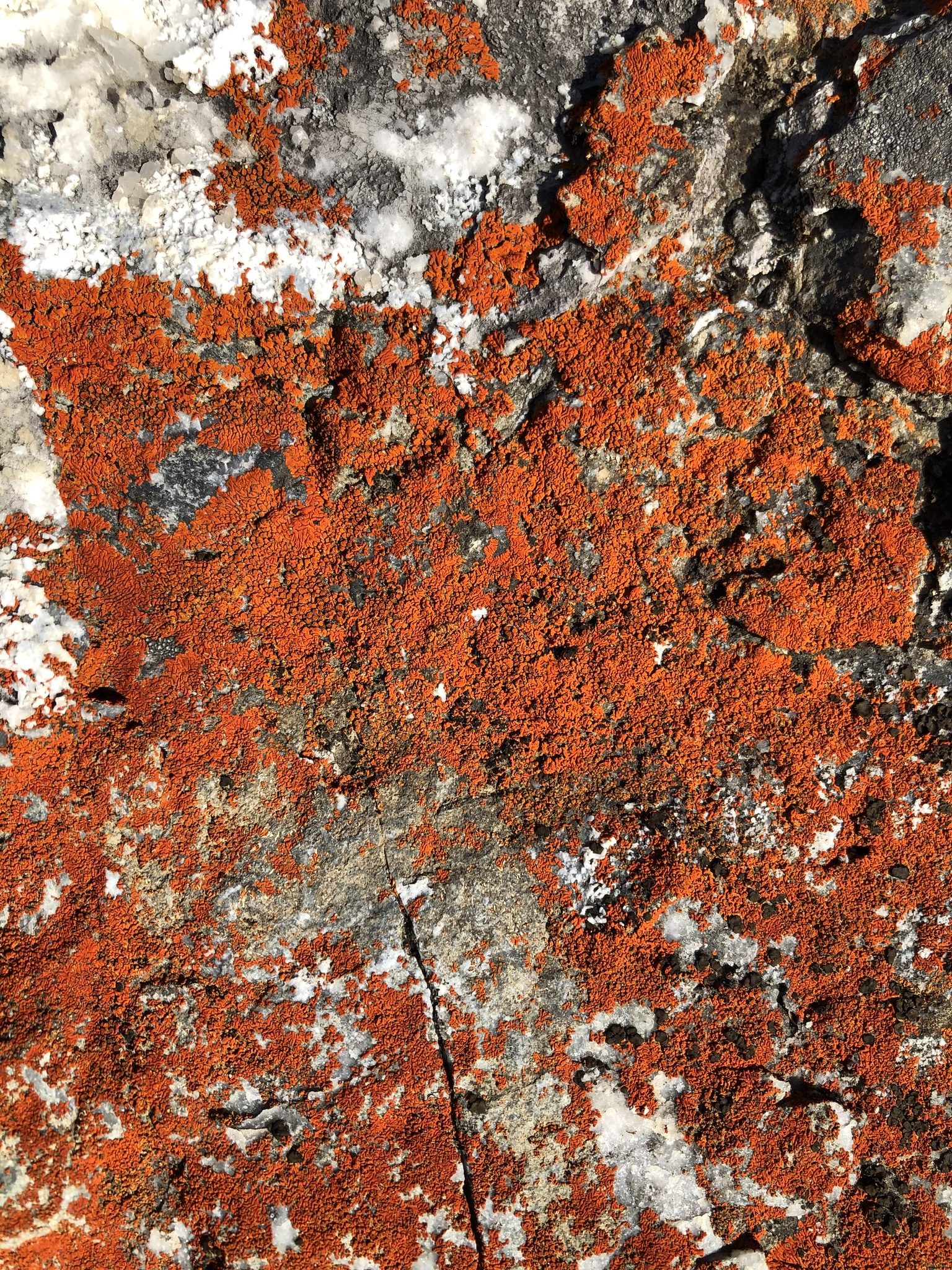

Scientific classification
- Domain: Eukaryota
- Kingdom: Fungi
- Division: Ascomycota
- Class: Lecanoromycetes
- Order: Teloschistales
- Family: Teloschistaceae
- Genus: Igneoplaca; S.Y.Kondr., Kärnefelt, Elix, A.Thell & Hur (2014)
- Species: I. ignea

Binomial name
- Igneoplaca ignea (Arup) S.Y.Kondr., Kärnefelt, Elix, A.Thell, Jung Kim, M.H.Jeong, N.N.Yu, A.S.Kondr. & Hur (2014)

Synonyms
- Caloplaca ignea Arup (1995); Polycauliona ignea (Arup) Arup (2013)

= Igneoplaca =

Lichen genus

Igneoplaca is a genus in the subfamily Xanthorioideae of the family Teloschistaceae. It contains a single species, the crustose lichen Igneoplaca ignea.

== Taxonomy ==
This species was first formally described in 1995 by Swedish lichenologist Ulf Arup, who included it in the genus Caloplaca. The type specimen was collected from Cape Punta Banda in Baja California, where it was found growing on rock pavement on a south-facing slope. The specific epithet ignea (meaning "fire-red") refers to the color of the lobes, which are often orange-red at the base with paler tips – somewhat resembling flames. In 2013, Arup transferred the taxon to the new genus Polycauliona in a molecular phylogenetic-based reorganization of the Teloschistaceae. A year later, Kondratyuk and colleagues reorganized Teloschistaceae subfamily Caloplacoideae, and circumscribed genus Igneoplaca to contain the taxon. The genus is named after its species.

== Description ==
Genus Igneoplaca is characterized by a crustose thallus, composed of red to orange lobes. Its cortical layer is paraplectenchymatous (fungal tissue with a cellular structure superficially like parenchyma of vascular plants), while its medulla is prosoplectenchymatous (fungal tissue with a structure superficially like collenchyma of vascular plants). Apothecia are lecanorine with a paraplectenchymatous true exciple. The lichen contains anthraquinones of the parietin chemosyndrome.

Igneoplaca is similar to Calogaya, but that genus does not have a prosoplectenchymatous medulla.

== Habitat and distribution ==
Igneoplaca ignea occurs in Baja Mexico and in southern California. It grows on rock in sunny areas, preferentially on acidic rock such as volcanic rock, schist, pebble, shale, and granite.
