= Poeltinula =

Scientific classification
- Kingdom: Fungi
- Division: Ascomycota
- Class: Lecanoromycetes
- Order: Rhizocarpales
- Family: Rhizocarpaceae
- Genus: Poeltinula; Hafellner (1984)

Type species
- Poeltinula cerebrina (DC.) Hafellner

Species
- P. cacuminum P. cerebrina P. cerebrinella

Synonyms
- Melanospora Mudd (1861); Encephalographomyces Cif. & Tomas. (1953)

Genus of lichen-forming fungi

Poeltinula is a small genus of lichen-forming fungi in the family Rhizocarpaceae. It comprises three species of crustose lichens that grow on limestone. The genus was established in 1984 by the lichenologist Josef Hafellner and is characterized by its inconspicuous, paint-like growth that often goes unnoticed until the distinctive black fruiting bodies appear. These lichens are recognized by their dark spores that turn bright red when treated with ammonia solution and their fruiting bodies that turn crimson when tested with potassium hydroxide solution.

== Description ==
Poeltinula species form an inconspicuous crustose thallus—a thin, paint-like growth that clings tightly to its substrate. Because the thallus is so reduced, it often goes unnoticed, and most field identifications rely on the appearance of the fruit bodies. The lichen's photosynthetic partner is a green alga with rounded cells (a chlorococcoid photobiont).

Reproduction occurs in black apothecia that can be angular, short and slit-like (lirelliform), forked, or even contorted. These discs begin as narrow cracks and may later widen; the surrounding true exciple forms a thick, inward-curving wall that appears dark reddish-brown and intensifies to crimson when a drop of potassium hydroxide solution is applied—a spot test used by lichenologists (K+ red). Beneath the disc, the hypothecium shares the same reddish-brown hue, while the transparent hymenium above it stains blue with iodine (I+ blue), showing that its carbohydrate matrix is amyloid. Fine filaments called paraphysoids thread through the hymenium; they are mostly unbranched but occasionally fuse near their slightly swollen tips, some of which carry a dark cap of pigment.

Each club-shaped ascus belongs to the "Rhizocarpon type", a structural pattern defined by a thickened, iodine-reactive apex, and contains eight ascospores. When young, the spores are clear and divided by a single cross-wall (septum); they soon darken to grey-green or violet-black and turn bright red in an ammonia solution (N+ red), a chemical reaction linked to quinone pigments in the spore wall. A gelatinous sheath (perispore) surrounds every spore, aiding dispersal by retaining moisture and helping the spores adhere to new substrates. No specialised asexual structures (pycnidia or conidia) are known for the genus, so spread appears to rely entirely on these distinctive, darkening spores released from the apothecial slits.

== Species ==
- Poeltinula cacuminum (Asta, Clauzade & Cl.Roux) Clauzade & Cl.Roux (1985)
- Poeltinula cerebrina (DC.) Hafellner (1984)
- Poeltinula cerebrinella (Nyl.) Øvstedal (2001)

The taxon once known as Poeltinula interjecta (Leight.) Hafellner (1993) is now Melaspilea interjecta.
