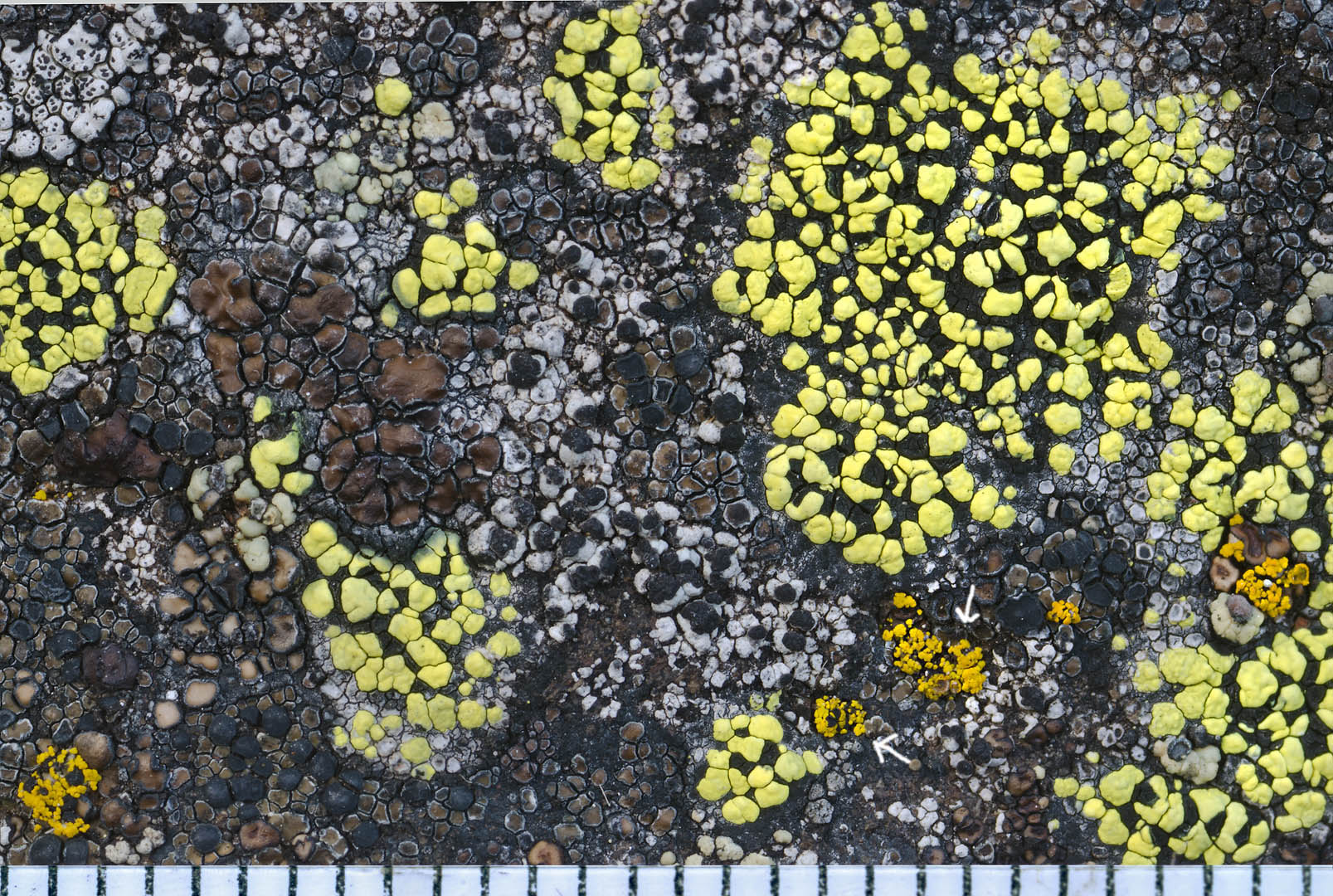

Conservation status
- Secure (NatureServe)

Scientific classification
- Kingdom: Fungi
- Division: Ascomycota
- Class: Lecanoromycetes
- Order: Lecanorales
- Family: Lecanoraceae
- Genus: Carbonea
- Species: C. vitellinaria

Binomial name
- Carbonea vitellinaria (Nyl.) Hertel (1983)

Synonyms
- Lecidea imponens Leight. (1878); Lecidea vitellinaria Nyl. (1852); Nesolechia vitellinaria (Nyl.) Rehm (1890); Lecidella vitellinaria (Nyl.) Kremp. (1861)

= Carbonea vitellinaria =

Species of fungus

Carbonea vitellinaria is a species of lichenicolous fungus belonging to the family Lecanoraceae. It has a worldwide distribution. In Iceland it has been reported growing on Candelariella vitellina near Egilsstaðir and on King George Island, Antarctica.
