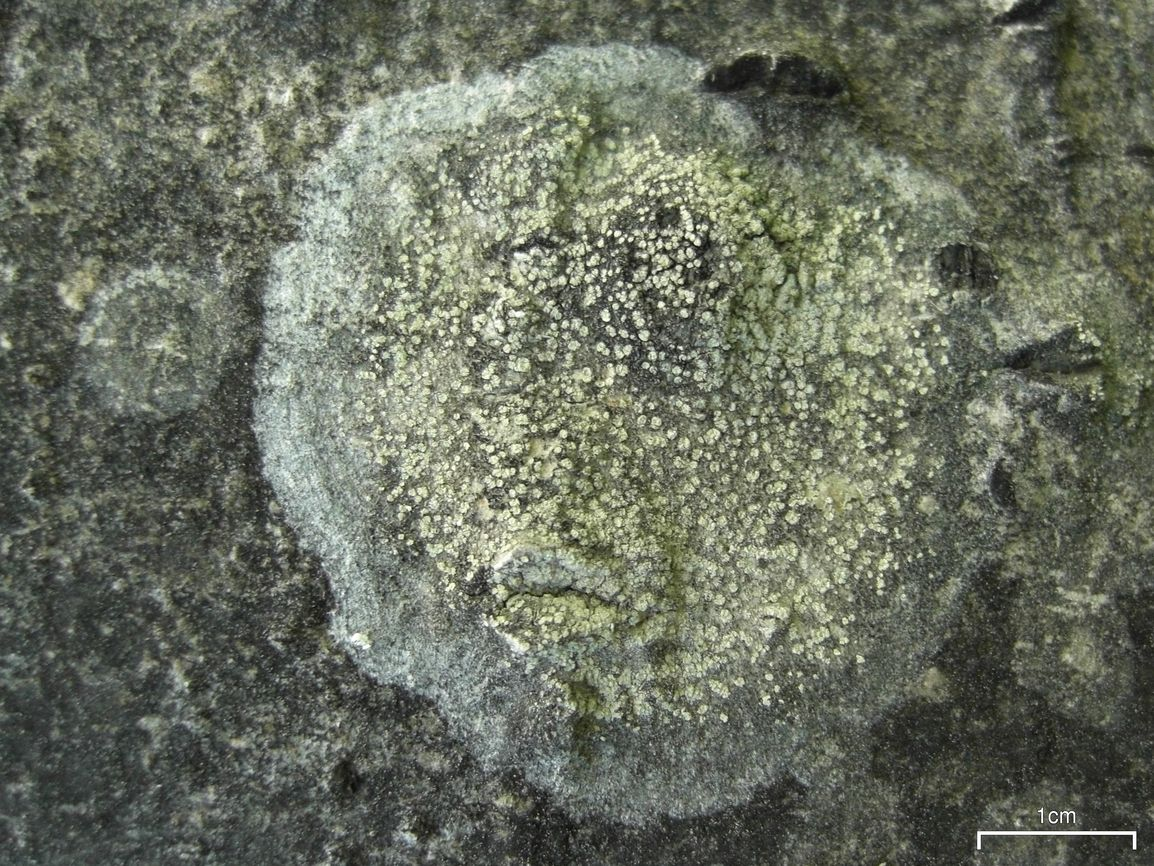

Conservation status
- Secure (NatureServe)

Scientific classification
- Kingdom: Fungi
- Division: Ascomycota
- Class: Lecanoromycetes
- Order: Lecanorales
- Family: Lecanoraceae
- Genus: Lecanora
- Species: L. impudens

Binomial name
- Lecanora impudens Degel. (1944)

Synonyms
- Pertusaria farinacea H.Magn. (1942)

= Lecanora impudens =

Species of lichen

Lecanora impudens is a species of crustose lichen in the family Lecanoraceae. It was described as new to science by Gunnar Degelius in 1944.

Lecanora impudens is a known host species to lichenicolous fungi, including Carbonea aggregantula and Dactylospora homoclinella.

== See also ==
- List of Lecanora species
