= Muellerella erratica =

Scientific classification
- Domain: Eukaryota
- Kingdom: Fungi
- Division: Ascomycota
- Class: Eurotiomycetes
- Order: Verrucariales
- Family: Verrucariaceae
- Genus: Muellerella
- Species: M. erratica

Binomial name
- Muellerella erratica (A.Massal.) Hafellner & V.John (2006)

Synonyms
- Tichothecium erraticum A.Massal. (1855)

Species of fungus

Muellerella erratica is a species of lichenicolous fungus in the family Verrucariaceae. It has been reported from numerous countries, including India. Known host species include the thallus of Lecidea lapicida and Lecanora.
