= Władysław Szafer Institute of Botany of the Polish Academy of Sciences =

Organization involved in herbarium research

Władysław Szafer Institute of Botany, Polish Academy of Sciences
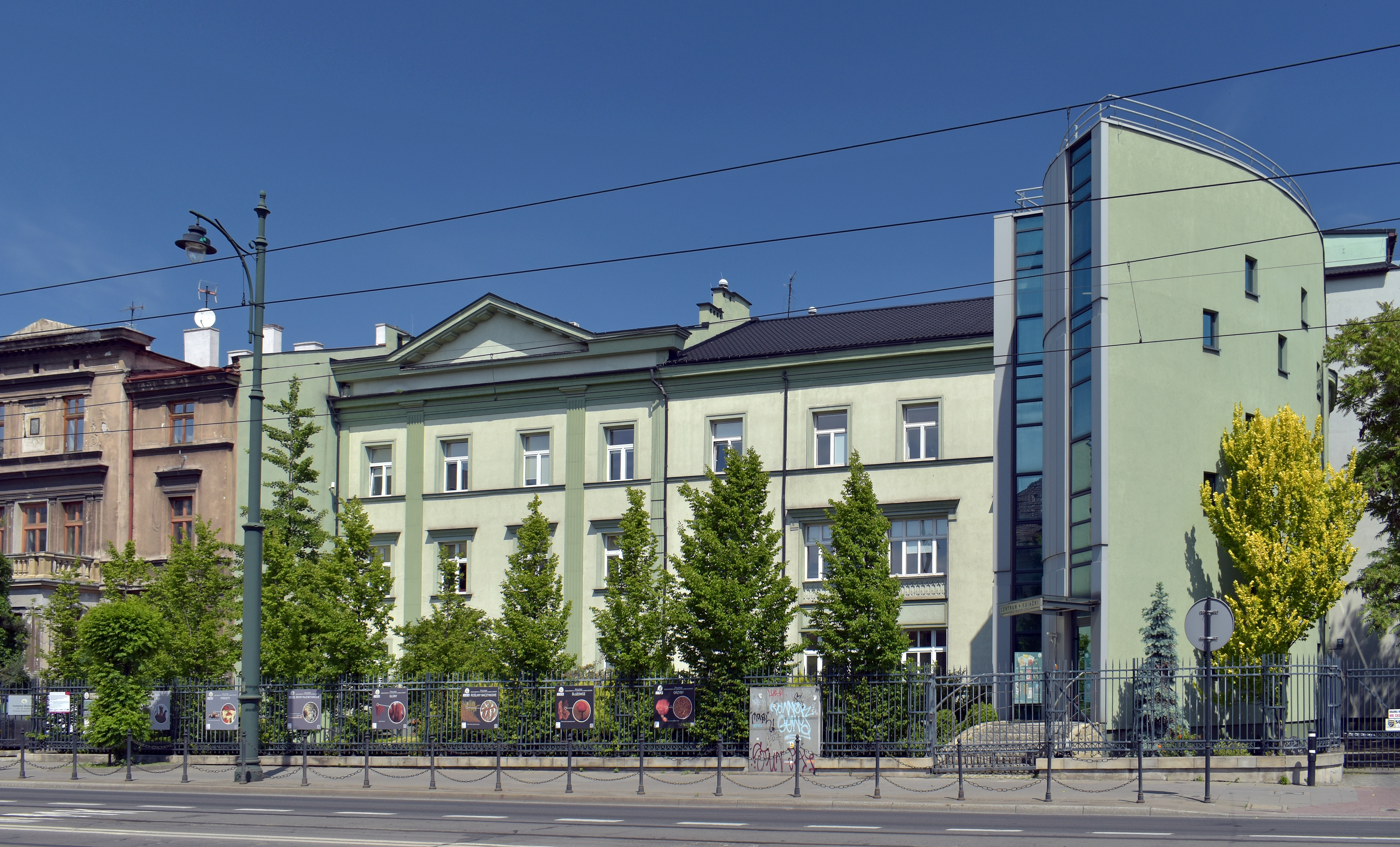
- Established: 5 October 1953
- Location: Kraków, Poland
- Coordinates: 50°06′N 20°00′E
- Key holdings: Polish Academy of Sciences
- Director: Lucyna Śliwa
- Website: www.botany.pl
- Location of Władysław Szafer Institute of Botany of the Polish Academy of Sciences

The Władysław Szafer Institute of Botany (Instytut Botaniki im. Władysława Szafera, Polish) in Kraków, Poland is a major European herbarium containing a collection of over 650,000 vascular plants, bryophytes, algae, fungi, lichens, and various plant fossils. The vascular plant specimens are primarily from Central Europe with a specialization in alpine plants. The bryophytes are Polish, Antarctic and subAntarctic, and East African. The fossil plants are largely Central European. Main publications include Acta Palaeobotanica, and the Polish Botanical Journal.

The herbarium was established in the 1950s by professor of botany and paleobotany, Władysław Szafer, at the Jagiellonian University in Kraków.
