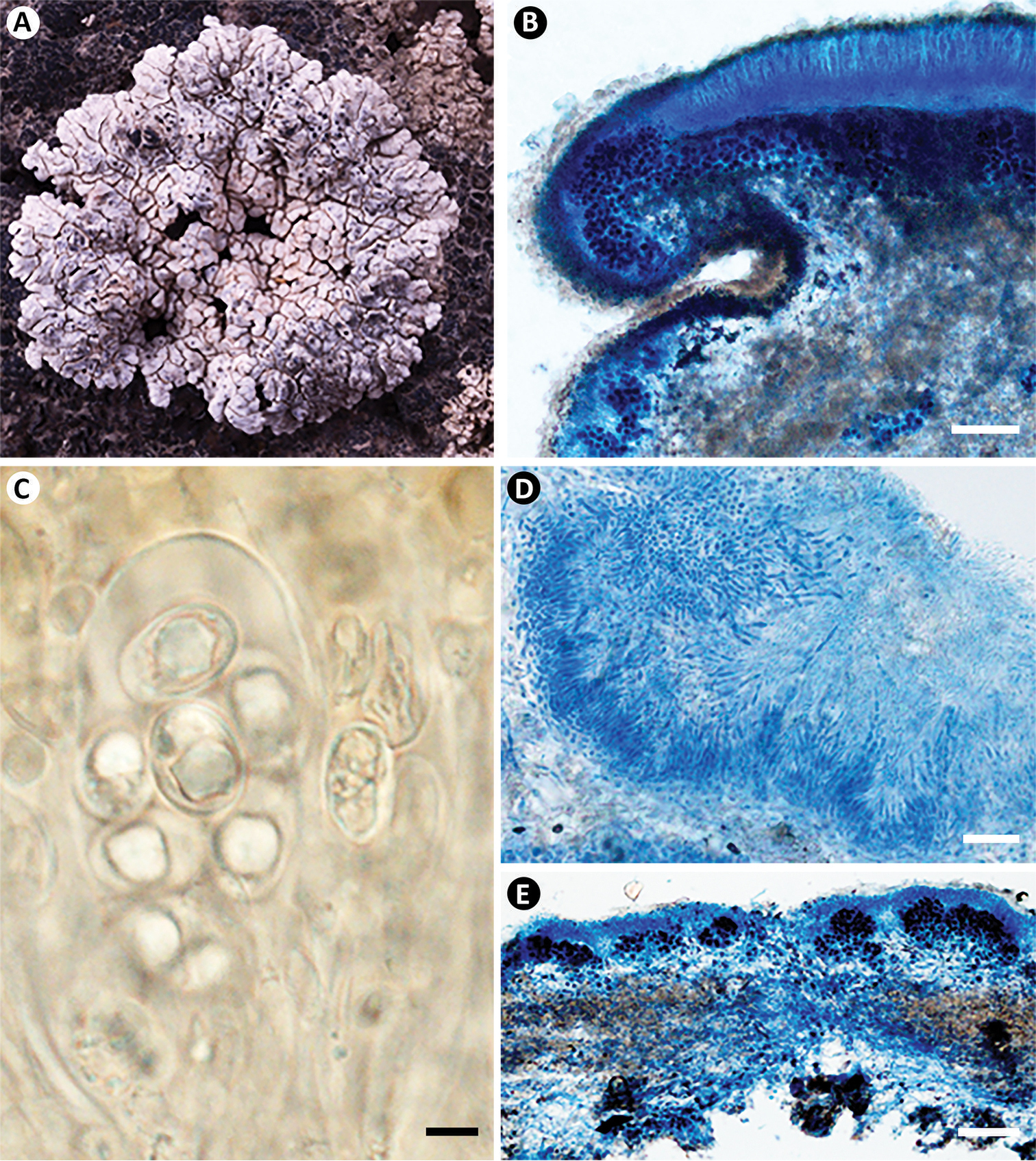

Scientific classification
- Kingdom: Fungi
- Division: Ascomycota
- Class: Lecanoromycetes
- Order: Pertusariales
- Family: Megasporaceae
- Genus: Lobothallia
- Species: L. semisterilis

Binomial name
- Lobothallia semisterilis (H.Magn.) Y.Y.Zhang (2020)

Synonyms
- Lecanora semisterilis H.Magn. (1940); Squamarina semisterilis (H.Magn.) J.C.Wei (1991)

= Lobothallia semisterilis =

Species of lichen-forming fungus

Lobothallia semisterilis is a species of terricolous (ground-dwelling) lichen in the family Megasporaceae. The species forms small rosettes up to 5 cm across on soil, with a white to grey, densely powdery upper surface and irregular elongate lobes at the margins. It grows in very dry, open habitats such as arid steppe and desert-like terrain at elevations between about 1,760 and 3,150 m, and is known only from Gansu and Qinghai provinces in north-western China.

== Taxonomy ==
Lobothallia semisterilis was originally described from Gansu Province, China, as Lecanora semisterilis by Adolf Hugo Magnusson in 1940, based on terricolous material collected by Birger Bohlin at 2,450–2,600 m elevation. It was later transferred to Squamarina as S. semisterilis by Jiang-Chun Wei in his enumeration of Chinese lichens. A re-examination of the type and newly collected material from the type region and neighbouring Qinghai, combining morphology, secondary metabolite, and multi-locus DNA data, showed that the species actually belongs in Lobothallia. In molecular analyses it forms a well-supported clade within Lobothallia, close to L. alphoplaca, L. melanaspis and L. praeradiosa, and it shares with that genus an Aspicilia-type ascus and bacilliform conidia, rather than the Porpidia-type ascus of Squamarina. On this basis Zhang and co-workers made the new combination Lobothallia semisterilis. Subsequent three-locus analyses based on additional material from Gansu confirmed that L. semisterilis forms a distinct, well-supported lineage within the core clade of Lobothallia, grouped with saxicolous species such as L. praeradiosa, L. rubra and L. stipitata.

Although Lobothallia is otherwise mainly saxicolous, L. semisterilis is unusual within the genus in being soil-dwelling and in having a distinctly pruinose, lobate thallus containing norstictic acid and lacking usnic acid. These features, together with its terricolous habit, help to distinguish it from the morphologically similar L. alphoplaca, L. melanaspis, L. praeradiosa and L. pruinosa.

== Description ==
The thallus of Lobothallia semisterilis is placodioid in form and forms rather small, ground-hugging rosettes that usually do not exceed about 5 cm in diameter. It grows directly on soil and is held to the substrate by hyphae from the medulla rather than a well-developed lower cortex. Towards the centre, the thallus breaks up into small, angular areoles that are mostly flat to gently convex and around 1 mm across. The outer zone bears narrow, somewhat uneven lobes about 1 mm wide and 2–3 mm long, which radiate from the centre and give the thallus a lobate outline. The upper surface is pale, ranging from white to grey, and is covered by a dense pruinose layer; this pruinose coating becomes especially coarse and granular towards the lobe tips. The underside is white and lacks a distinct lower cortex. In vertical section the upper cortex is colourless with a slightly browned outer rim and is topped by a thin, colourless epinecral layer. Beneath this, the algal layer is relatively deep but occurs in discrete bands separated by narrow, almost algal-free gaps, and the medulla contains numerous grey granules.

Apothecia (sexual fruiting bodies) are common, appearing as low, rounded structures that narrow slightly at the base and reach about 2 mm across. Their disc is blackish-brown, flat to faintly convex and lacks pruina, and is encircled by a thalline margin that is the same colour as the surrounding thallus. The hymenium is hyaline and about 60 μm tall, topped by a brown, granular epihymenium; the paraphyses are simple with somewhat thickened tips, and the asci are eight-spored and belong to the Aspicilia type. Ascospores are ellipsoid, colourless and typically measure 9–13 × 5–9 μm. Pycnidia are abundant and conspicuous, often mimicking very small apothecia; they are 0.1–0.4 mm wide, with dark brown to blackish ostioles, and produce slender, bacilliform conidia about 5.5–6.5 × 1 μm. In standard spot tests the upper cortex reacts K+ (red) and is C− and P−, while the medulla is K+ (red), C− and P+ (yellow), a pattern that corresponds to the presence of norstictic acid as the main secondary metabolite.

== Habitat and distribution ==
Lobothallia semisterilis grows on soil in very dry, open habitats, including arid steppe and desert-like terrain, at mid to high elevations of about 1,760–3,150 m. It grows as part of biological soil crust communities on exposed soil, often intermingled with other terricolous lichens. It is known to occur only in north-western China, where it was originally collected in Gansu Province and has since been rediscovered there and in neighbouring Qinghai Province. It is one of 22 Lobothallia species recorded from China, where the genus reaches its greatest diversity in the arid mountains of the north and north-west.
