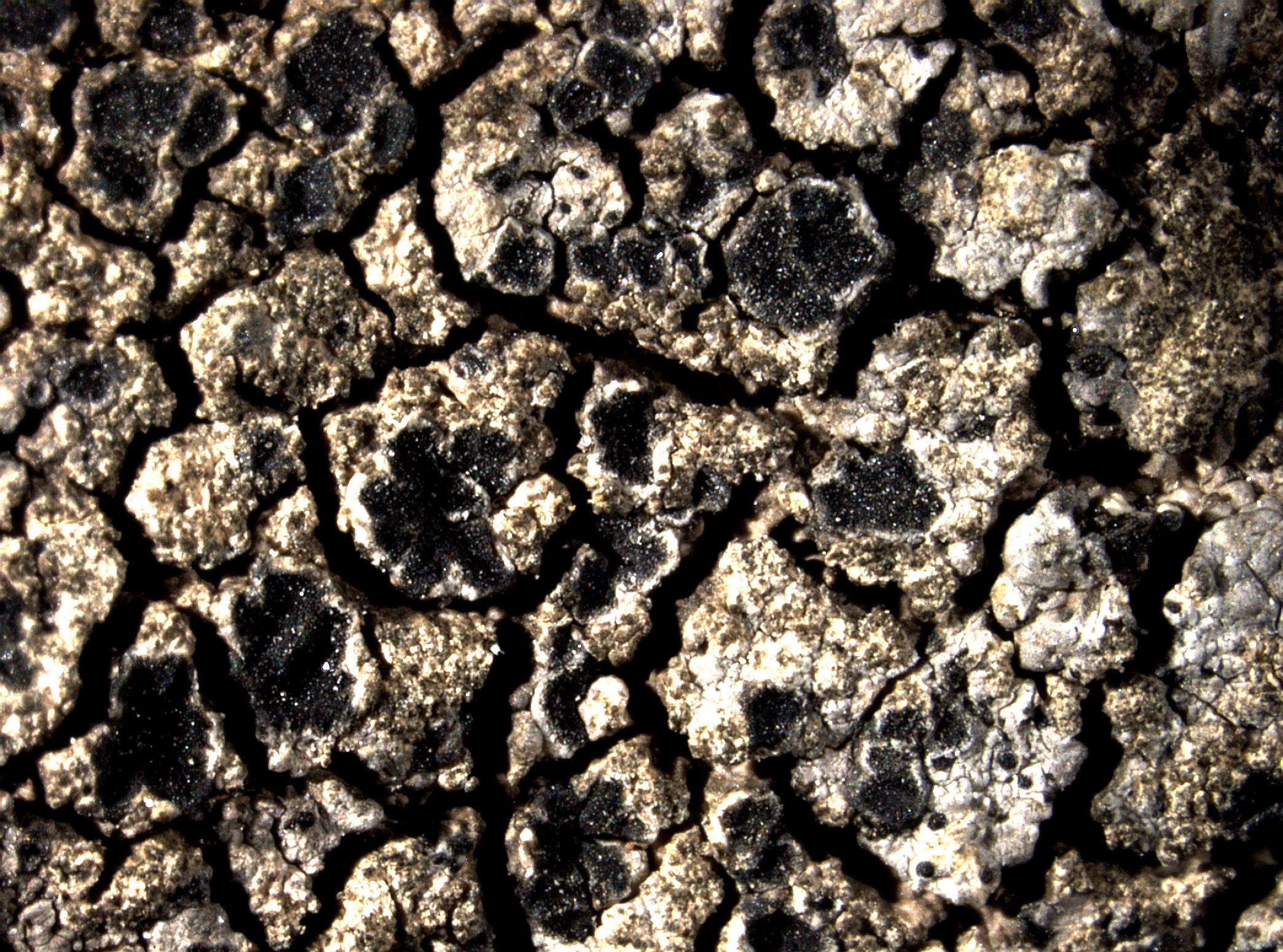
- Sagedia simoensis

Scientific classification
- Kingdom: Fungi
- Division: Ascomycota
- Class: Lecanoromycetes
- Order: Pertusariales
- Family: Megasporaceae
- Genus: Sagedia; Ach. (1809)

Type species
- Sagedia zonata Ach. (1809)

= Sagedia =

Genus of lichen-forming fungi

Sagedia is a genus of lichen-forming fungi in the family Megasporaceae. Sagedia species are crustose lichens with immersed, wart-like fruiting bodies that show a depressed disc and a distinct, often raised margin. The genus was established in 1809 by the Swedish lichenologist Erik Acharius and contains 15 recognised species. These lichens grow on rocks or bark and are characterized by a tightly adherent crust that ranges from grey to pale brown, often with faint concentric bands. The genus belongs to a group of related lichens sometimes called the aspicilioid crusts, and its exact boundaries remain debated.

== Taxonomy ==
The genus Sagedia was introduced by the Swedish lichenologist Erik Acharius in 1809, with a brief Latin diagnosis that emphasised a tightly adherent crust (a crustose thallus) and wart-like apothecia that arise from, and are partly sunk into, the thallus. He described the apothecial top as a coloured membrane bearing a disc-shaped depression, covering an internal, thallus-like "nucleus"; he summarised the thallus itself as "crustaceous, uniform".

Acharius's protologue included two species. Sagedia laevata (now Aspicilia laevata) was characterised by a contiguous, smooth crust of dirty grey-green colour and by blackish-brown warty apothecia whose discs are impressed and concave with a slightly raised, somewhat reddish rim; he recorded it "on rocks near Carlberg" in Södermanland (Sweden). The type species, Sagedia zonata, was said to have a very thin, finely cracked ash-grey to glaucous crust marked by several irregular whitish lines that give a zoned appearance at the margin; its apothecia are black, with the disc impressed into the thallus and a gently elevated, nearly entire rim. Acharius noted it "on stones at Särna, near the mountains" in Dalarna.

In modern treatments, Sagedia is placed within the Megasporaceae among the "aspicilioid" crusts—lichens with a trebouxioid green alga and lecanorine apothecia (with discs rimmed by thallus tissue) that are usually immersed in the thallus. Molecular work on Aspicilia (in the loose sense) has split that complex into segregate genera and reintroduced Sagedia (alongside Circinaria), with other lineages assigned to Lobothallia, Megaspora, and later the resurrected or newly described Aspiciliella and Teuvoa. That said, only a fraction of European material has been sequenced, and the boundary between Aspicilia sensu stricto and Sagedia remains disputed: some authors sink Sagedia (with Circinaria, Megaspora and Aspiciliella) to subgeneric rank under a broad Aspicilia, retaining Lobothallia as the only separate genus. Nimis adopts a pragmatic approach—sympathetic to the broad concept but, pending wider sampling, provisionally using the narrower segregates and leaving unresolved species in Aspicilia.

== Description ==
Sagedia forms a crust that adheres tightly to the rock or bark surface (a crustose thallus). It ranges from weakly to distinctly cracked into small polygonal areoles and can show faint concentric banding; colours are mostly grey to pale brown. A narrow marginal fringe (the prothallus) is usually inconspicuous but may appear as a grey to black, fibrous or fringed border. Some species reproduce vegetatively by producing soralia, which are small patches of powdery propagules (soredia) that form as discrete, slightly glued-together spots. The photosynthetic partner is a unicellular green alga (a chlorococcoid photobiont). The inner white layer of the lichen body (the medulla does not react with iodine (I−).

The sexual fruiting bodies are apothecia that are mostly sunk into the thallus. They have a thin thalline margin—a slight rim made from the lichen's own tissue—and a generally flat, dark brown to black disc that only rarely carries a pale, frosty bloom (pruina). The rim of fungal tissue immediately surrounding the disc (the true exciple) is usually colourless and weakly developed, lying to the sides of and beneath the fertile layer, though it may broaden upwards and match the colour of the disc surface. The very top of the disc (the epithecium) contains a distinctive green pigment often called Aspicilia green: it becomes a stronger green with the standard N spot test and may fade towards brown with K (K±). Beneath this lies a relatively tall, colourless hymenium (the spore-bearing layer), which turns green or blue with iodine (I+). The tissue under the hymenium (the hypothecium) is colourless to very pale brown, and the algal layer sits below it. The hymenium is threaded by numerous slender sterile filaments (paraphyses) that are mostly unbranched but often fuse with one another; their bead-like tips stick together to form the well-defined pigmented cap of the disc. The asci are cylindrical to club-shaped and contain eight spores; a thin outer coat turns blue with the combined K/I test, but the ascus wall and its apical dome do not.

Ascospores are single-celled (aseptate), medium to large, ellipsoid, colourless and thin-walled. Asexual reproductive structures (pycnidia) are immersed in the thallus and vary from elongated, flask-shaped bodies to almost spherical ones, occurring singly or in small clusters; their walls are usually colourless but may be brown or green in the upper part, with the same pigment seen in the epithecium. The conidiogenous cells are short and nearly cylindrical, producing colourless, single-celled conidia that are rod-shaped to cylindrical and more or less straight. No lichen secondary metabolites have been detected by thin-layer chromatography.

== Species ==
As of October 2025, Species Fungorum (in the Catalogue of Life) accept 15 species of Sagedia.

- Sagedia alpina (Bagl. & Carestia) Jatta (1900)
- Sagedia atrata Müll.Arg. (1867)
- Sagedia augustana Britzelm. (1904)
- Sagedia calcarea Deakin (1854)
- Sagedia cryptarum (Garov.) B.de Lesd. (1907)
- Sagedia decipiens A.Massal. (1856)
- Sagedia ferruginosa Eitner (1911)
- Sagedia macrospora Miyoshi (1901)
- Sagedia mastrucata (Wahlenb.) A.Nordin, Savić & Tibell (2010)
- Sagedia nunatakkorum (Poelt) S.Y.Kondr. (2016)
- Sagedia simoensis (Räsänen) A.Nordin, Savić & Tibell (2010)
- Sagedia tenebricosa (A.Massal.) Jatta (1900)
- Sagedia umbonata (Schaer.) Jatta (1900)
- Sagedia werneri M.Choisy (1931)
- Sagedia werwaestii B.de Lesd. (1906)
