= Atrostelia =

Scientific classification
- Kingdom: Fungi
- Division: Ascomycota
- Class: Lecanoromycetes
- Order: Pertusariales
- Family: Megasporaceae
- Genus: Atrostelia; Paukov, Davydov & Yakovch. (2024)
- Species: A. magnifica

Binomial name
- Atrostelia magnifica Paukov, Davydov & Yakovch. (2024)

Single-species fungal genus

Atrostelia is a single-species fungal genus in the family Megasporaceae (order Pertusariales). It comprises the species Atrostelia magnifica, a saxicolous (rock-dwelling) crustose lichen.

== Taxonomy ==
Atrostelia was proposed by in 2024 Alexander Paukov, Evgeny Davydov and Lidia Yakovchenko on the basis of ribosomal DNA phylogenies (ITS, LSU and mtSSU). The genus contains a single species, Atrostelia magnifica, known from high-elevation sites in the Mongun-Taiga massif of the Republic of Tyva (southern Siberia, Russia).

In phylogenetic analyses, Atrostelia is recovered as a close relative (sister genus) of Aspiciliella, but it was separated because it combines a dark-brown, radiating, lobe-margined (placodioid) thallus with comparatively large ascospores (about 22–36 μm long) and the production of substictic acid. It can resemble Lobothallia in general appearance, but differs in spore size and chemistry. The genus name Atrostelia refers to the dark, radiating thalli, while the specific epithet magnifica alludes to the large, conspicuous thallus in the field.

== Description ==
The thallus of Atrostelia magnifica is a rock-dwelling crust that forms rounded patches up to about 7 cm across and 1–2 mm thick. It is brown to dark brown, with radiating furrows towards the margin and a distinct lobe-like edge (the marginal areoles are elongated, often with darker, finger-like tips). The surface is typically uneven and tuberculate because it is covered by a dead outer layer (an epinecral layer), and the centre breaks into irregular areoles. The photobiont is a trebouxioid green alga; the algal layer is discontinuous and there are no algal cells beneath the hypothecium.

Fruiting bodies (apothecia) begin immersed and later become more exposed. The discs are black, about 0.5–1.5 mm wide, sometimes with a faint whitish pruina, and bordered by a thalline margin that is paler when young but darkens with age. Microscopic features include a hymenium about 105–150 μm tall, mostly simple (or sparsely branched) paraphyses, and an 8-spored ascus with hyaline, simple, egg-shaped to ellipsoid spores measuring roughly (22–)23–31(–36) × (12–)13–19(–23) μm. Pycnidia are frequent and produce straight, rod-shaped conidia (roughly 5–10 μm long). Chemically, the species contains substictic acid, and it was reported to show no colour change when treated with potassium hydroxide solution (the K test).

== Habitat and distribution ==
Atrostelia magnifica grows on sun-exposed rocks in alpine environments, where it is reported as common on stonefields within alpine meadows and mountain tundra. Collections were made at about 2,400–2,700 m elevation. The type material comes from the Mongun-Taiga massif (Tyva, Russia), where it was collected on rock at roughly 2,550 m above sea level.

At present, the genus is only known from the Mongun-Taiga massif within the Altai mountain system and is treated as endemic to that area on current evidence. The authors suggest its range may prove wider with further collecting in nearby high-mountain regions, including neighbouring parts of China, Mongolia, Kazakhstan and Russia.
