= Megaspora iranica =

Scientific classification
- Kingdom: Fungi
- Division: Ascomycota
- Class: Lecanoromycetes
- Order: Pertusariales
- Family: Megasporaceae
- Genus: Megaspora
- Species: M. iranica

Binomial name
- Megaspora iranica Haji Moniri & S.Y.Kondr. (2017)
- Holotype: Tagan village, Iran

Species of lichen

Megaspora iranica is a species of lichen in the family Megasporaceae. This bark-dwelling lichen forms whitish to pale grey crusts with a distinctive network of cracks filled with greyish powdery reproductive granules, giving it a characteristic tessellated appearance. It is known from scattered sites across north-eastern Iran and central Asia, where it grows on the bark of deciduous trees such as white mulberry and Montpellier maple.

== Taxonomy ==
Megaspora iranica was described as a new species in 2013 by Mohammad Haji Moniri and Sergey Kondratyuk. It was distinguished from the related M. rimisorediata by several morphological traits. The type specimen was collected in Razavi Khorasan Province, north-eastern Iran, near Tagan village on the Dargaz–Quchan road, at an elevation of 900 m. It was found growing on the bark of white mulberry (Morus alba). The holotype is housed in the TARI herbarium.

== Description ==
Megaspora iranica forms a crust-like thallus that spreads across its substrate in patches 5–10 cm wide, sometimes merging into larger mats. The surface is whitish to pale grey and strongly cracked, creating a network of fissures that resemble those of the related species M. rimisorediata. The cracks often contrast with the powdery reproductive granules (soredia), which are greyish because of embedded crystals. The thallus is relatively thin, with a layered structure: a variable upper cortex, a green algal layer containing relatively large algal cells, and a whitish inner medulla. The outer cortex is thickened and crystal-rich, with cell arrangements resembling those in some Teloschistaceae lichens. Along the cracks, dense bands of soredia are produced, each about 40–50 micrometres (μm) across, serving as the main means of vegetative propagation.

The species also develops small fruiting bodies (apothecia), usually less than 1.5 mm in diameter. These start immersed in the thallus and later become more exposed, with flat to concave discs that may be dusted with a pale coating. Internally, the apothecia contain a spore-bearing layer up to 250 μm tall, supported by branched filaments (paraphyses) and capped by a dull greenish-brown surface layer. Each spore sac (ascus) carries 4–8 colourless ascospores, which are ovoid to broadly ellipsoid and relatively large—typically 32–37 by 17–21 μm. Mature spores often contain conspicuous oil droplets, and in old apothecia they may appear flattened or slightly discoloured. Chemical spot tests on the fruiting bodies show diagnostic colour changes: sections turn brown that intensifies to green or olive with potassium hydroxide solution (K), while the application of nitrite (N) produces a greenish reaction, with some brownish-olive areas shifting to an intense green.

== Habitat and distribution ==
Megaspora iranica grows on the bark of deciduous trees, with confirmed collections from white mulberry (Morus alba) and Montpellier maple (Acer monspessulanum). It has been recorded from scattered sites in north-eastern Iran and more widely across parts of central Asia.
