= Clauzadeana =

Scientific classification
- Domain: Eukaryota
- Kingdom: Fungi
- Division: Ascomycota
- Class: Lecanoromycetes
- Order: Lecanorales
- Family: Lecanoraceae
- Genus: Clauzadeana; Cl.Roux (1984)

Type species
- Clauzadeana instratula (Nyl.) Cl.Roux (1984)

Species
- C. instratula C. macula

Genus of lichens

Clauzadeana is a genus of lichen-forming fungi in the family Lecanoraceae. The genus was circumscribed in 1984 by Claude Roux, with the crustose species C. instratula assigned as the type.

The genus name Clauzadeana honours F.J. Georges Clauzade (1914–2002), a French teacher and botanist (Mycology and Lichenology).
