= Oxneriaria pakistanica =

Scientific classification
- Kingdom: Fungi
- Division: Ascomycota
- Class: Lecanoromycetes
- Order: Pertusariales
- Family: Megasporaceae
- Genus: Oxneriaria
- Species: O. pakistanica

Binomial name
- Oxneriaria pakistanica M.S.Iqbal, Usman, K.Habib & Khalid (2023)
- Holotype: Gilgit-Baltistan, Pakistan

Species of lichen

Oxneriaria pakistanica is a species of saxicolous (rock-dwelling), crustose lichen in the family Megasporaceae. The species was described in 2023 by Muhammad Shahid Iqbal, Muhammad Usman, Kamran Habib, and Abdul Nasir Khalid. The specific epithet pakistanica refers to Pakistan, the country where it was discovered. Molecular phylogenetics analysis of internal transcribed spacer sequences placed O. pakistanica as sister to O. rivulicola, though it is morphologically distinct.

== Description ==
Oxneriaria pakistanica has a crustose, non-zonate thallus that is initially placodioid (lobate) but becomes non-placodioid with age, reaching up to 5 cm across. The areoles are distinctly developed, uncracked, 0.5–1.8 mm wide, and broadly attached to the substrate. The upper surface is dull and epruinose, and whitish grey to greyish in colour. No prothallus is present.

The apothecia (fruiting bodies) are frequent, aspicilioid, and immersed in the thallus. They measure 0.5–2 mm in diameter and have a black, dull disc. The hymenium is 100–155 μm tall and the hypothecium is 90–170 μm deep. Ascospores are simple, hyaline, broadly ellipsoid to sub-spherical, and measure 10–18 by 7–10 μm.

== Habitat and distribution ==
Oxneriaria pakistanica is known only to occur in its type locality in the Darel Valley of Gilgit-Baltistan, Pakistan. It was found growing on calcareous sedimentary rocks in a moist temperate climate at elevations around 1,900–2,000 m (6,200–6,600 ft). It is one of six Oxneriaria species known to occur in Pakistan; the others are O. crittendenii, O. iqbalii, O. kohistaniensis, and O. pruinosa.
