= Teuvoa =

Scientific classification
- Domain: Eukaryota
- Kingdom: Fungi
- Division: Ascomycota
- Class: Lecanoromycetes
- Order: Pertusariales
- Family: Megasporaceae
- Genus: Teuvoa; Sohrabi & S.D.Leav. (2013)

Type species
- Teuvoa uxoris (Werner) Sohrabi, V.J.Rico & S.Leav. (2013)

Species
- T. alpina T. junipericola T. saxicola T. tibetica T. uxoris

Genus of lichens

Teuvoa is a genus of lichen-forming fungi in the family Megasporaceae. It was first classified by lichenologists Mohammad Sohrabi and Steven Leavitt in 2013, with Teuvoa uxoris assigned as the type species. This genus was delineated from the larger genus, Aspicilia, following a molecular phylogenetic analysis which revealed that the Aspicilia uxoris species group constituted a distinct lineage in the Megasporaceae. Initially containing three species, two additional species native to China were added in 2018. Teuvoa is characterised by its small ascospores and conidia, and the absence of secondary metabolites.

The physical characteristics of Teuvoa include a crustose thallus, forming a distinct areolate or patchy pattern, which can range from white to grey in colour with a dull surface. The innermost layer, or medulla, is white. The genus's photobiont, a photosynthesising partner, generally belongs to the green alga genus Trebouxia or similar chlorococcoid genera. Reproduction in Teuvoa occurs through the formation of apothecia, cup-like structures that bear spore-producing asci. Teuvoa is distinct from related genera such as Aspicilia and Lobothallia due to a variety of features including size, secondary metabolites, and ecological amplitude.

== Taxonomy ==
The genus was circumscribed in 2013 by lichenologists Mohammad Sohrabi and Steven Leavitt with Teuvoa uxoris assigned as the type species. Teuvoa was segregated from the large genus Aspicilia (family Megasporaceae) after molecular phylogenetic analysis revealed that the Aspicilia uxoris species group formed a monophyletic clade that represented an independent lineage within the Megasporaceae. Three species were initially placed in the genus; two additional species from China were added in 2018. Teuvoa is distinguished from Aspicilia by its small ascospores and conidia (the latter measuring 5–8 μm), and the lack of secondary metabolites. The genus name honours Finnish lichenologist Teuvo Ahti, "one of the prominent lichen taxonomists of the 20th century".

== Description ==
The crustose thallus, or body, of Teuvoa, forms a distinctly areolate or patchy pattern. It can appear white to grey in colour and possesses a dull surface. Unlike some lichens, Teuvoa lacks cephalodia (specialised structures for nitrogen-fixing cyanobacteria) and pseudocyphellae (small pores on the lichen surface). Beneath the surface, Teuvoa has a single-layered cortex comprising paraplectenchymatous tissue, a particular type of arrangement of fungal hyphae. Its medulla, or innermost layer, is white in colour and does not turn blue when exposed to iodine (I−). The photobiont, or photosynthesising partner, in this lichen genus can be from the green alga genus Trebouxia or similar chlorococcoid genera, with the algal cells being more or less spherical in shape.

The reproductive structures of Teuvoa, the ascomata, form apothecia, cup-like structures bearing spore-producing asci. The disc of these structures ranges from black to brown-black and can be flat or occasionally concave or convex. The thalline margin surrounding the disc is elevated and matches the colour of the thallus. The exciple, or external tissue of the ascomata, is thin and can be stained by iodine (I+).

Internally, the epihymenium, the top layer of the hymenium (spore-bearing tissue), presents a green to olive-brown colour. The subhymenium and hypothecium (layers beneath the hymenium) are colourless but turn blue when exposed to iodine (I+ blue). The asci resemble those of the genus Aspicilia, with their wall and apical dome not turning blue when iodine is applied (I−), while their outer coat does (I+ blue). The ascospores are simple, colourless, and can be spherical to ellipsoid in shape. Additionally, Teuvoa forms pycnidia, small flask-shaped structures producing asexual spores or conidia, which are hyaline (translucent), simple, and tend to be more or less straight.

Species in this genus do not react with common chemical spot tests. Moreover, no secondary metabolites (lichen products) that are often important for lichen identification, have been detected in Teuvoa.

Teuvoa is distinct from Aspicilia due to its smaller ascospore and conidia size, measuring 5–8 μm, and the lack of secondary metabolites It also differs from the genus Lobothallia, in that it does not have lobate, radiating thalli, a subhypothecial algal layer, or certain secondary metabolites, and it grows on organic substrates such as bark, wood, and dead plant debris. Teuvoa also stands apart from Aspicilia subgenus Pachyothallia due to its absence of a subhypothecial algal layer, lecanoroid apothecia, certain secondary metabolites, and its different ecological amplitude, growing on organic substrates.

== Habitat, ecology, and distribution ==
The lichen genus Teuvoa consists of five species, each having a unique habitat preference and geographical distribution. Teuvoa junipericola is primarily found across the arid continental regions of the western United States. Its distribution is notably concentrated within the Colorado Plateau and Great Basin, regions known for their unique ecological characteristics. Teuvoa uxoris is a species with a Madrean-Thethyan disjunction, a distribution pattern typically found in plants of Mediterranean and Tethyan regions. Its distribution spans across vast continental Mediterranean zones that include the Mediterranean, Irano-Turanian, and Saharo-Sindian phytogeographical regions, suggesting a possible shared ecology with other lichens and bryophytes known to inhabit these areas.

In terms of habitat, Teuvoa uxoris favours coniferous trees and shrubs, including Cedrus atlantica, several Juniperus species, and Pinus halepensis. Given these hosts' acidic bark, it is plausible that T. uxoris may also be found on other conifer species such as Juniperus excelsa, J. osteosperma, J. polycarpos, and J. sabina. The geographical range of these Cupressaceae is broad and includes the western and eastern Mediterranean, Minor Asia, Central Asia, Pakistan, and India. T. uxoris seems to prefer open forests in semi-arid regions, away from coastal influences, and in areas with distinct seasonal climate changes. There have been instances where T. uxoris was discovered on different substrates, indicating its capacity to adapt to varied habitats.

Teuvoa tibetica is native to the Himalaya Range in Tibet. It particularly thrives in high-altitude regions, specifically between 5,100–5,300 m (16,700–17,400 ft), in areas dotted with Kobresia meadows and rocky slopes. There, it grows on soil. Teuvoa saxicola is recognised in the Qinghai and Xinjiang provinces of northwestern China. This species displays a preference for siliceous rock, thriving in arid and semi-arid habitats, thereby mirroring the conditions found in the habitats of its genus companions. Teuvoa alpina is also native to northwestern China, with a distribution similar to T. saxicola. However, unlike T. saxicola, T. alpina favours coniferous wood as a substrate, reflecting the wide range of habitats thatTeuvoa species have adapted to within similar geographical regions.

== Species ==
- Teuvoa alpina Q.Ren (2018)
- Teuvoa junipericola Sohrabi & S.D.Leav. (2013)
- Teuvoa saxicola Q.Ren (2018)
- Teuvoa tibetica (Sohrabi & Owe-Larss.) Sohrabi (2013)
- Teuvoa uxoris (Werner) Sohrabi, V.J.Rico & S.D.Leav. (2013)
