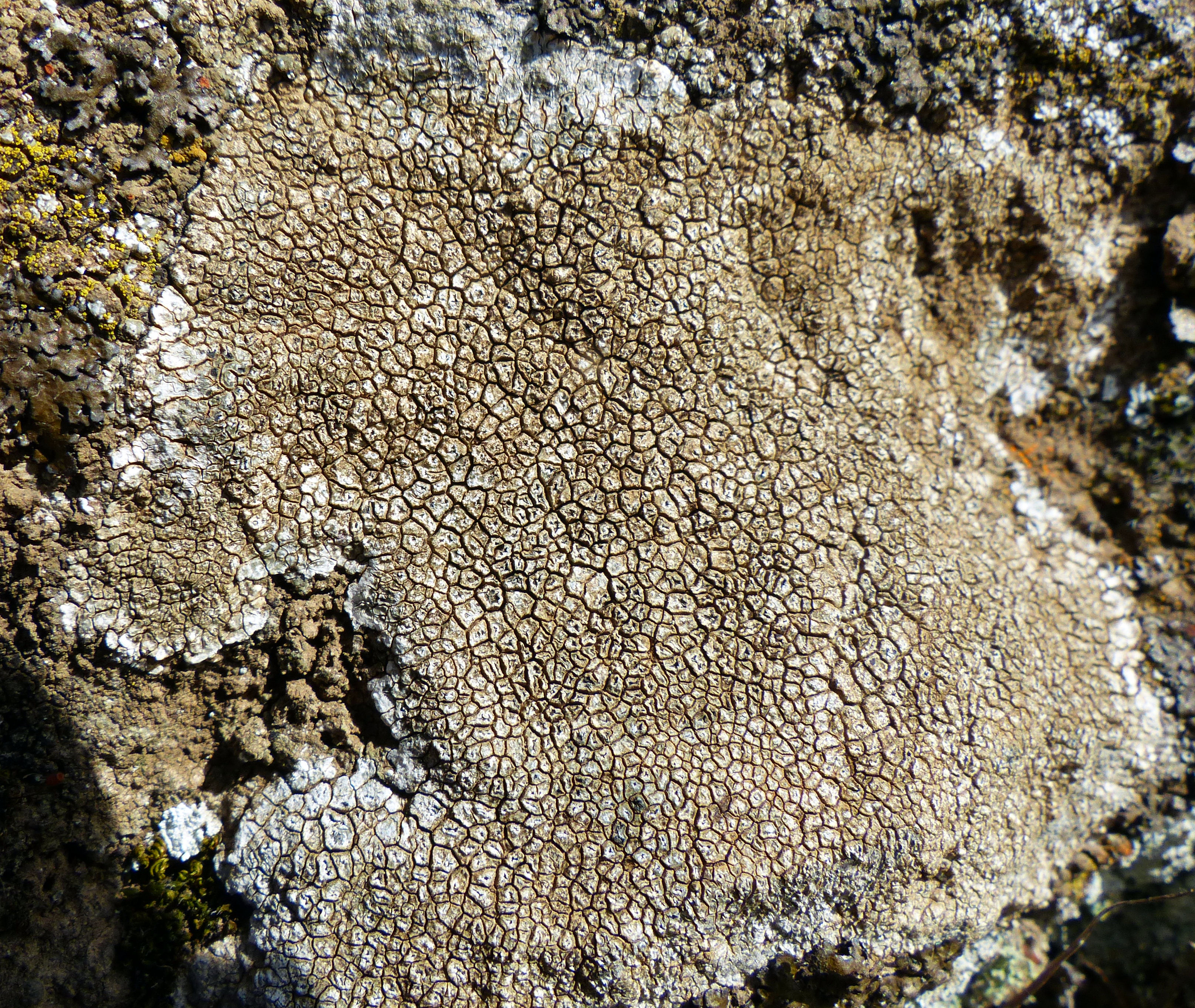
- In Tusculum, Italy

Scientific classification
- Kingdom: Fungi
- Division: Ascomycota
- Class: Lecanoromycetes
- Order: Pertusariales
- Family: Megasporaceae
- Genus: Aspiciliella
- Species: A. intermutans

Binomial name
- Aspiciliella intermutans (Nyl.) M.Choisy (1932)

Synonyms
- List: Lecanora intermutans Nyl. (1872); Aspicilia intermutans (Nyl.) Arnold (1887); Lecanora cinerea var. intermutans (Nyl.) H.Olivier (1897); Aspicilia cinerea var. intermutans (Nyl.) Boistel (1903); Pachyospora intermutans (Nyl.) M.Choisy (1931); Aspicilia reticulata var. intermutans (Nyl.) Szatala (1935); Squamaria reticulata var. intermutans (Nyl.) Szatala (1960)

= Aspiciliella intermutans =

Species of lichen-forming fungus

Aspiciliella intermutans is a species of crustose (crust-forming), rock-dwelling lichen in the fungal family Megasporaceae. It was described by William Nylander in 1872 as Lecanora intermutans, based on material collected on sandstone near Saint-Laon and on granite near Brest in France, and distinguished from the similar Lecanora cinerea by its larger spores and shorter spermatia (conidia). The species was later transferred to Aspicilia, and is now placed in Aspiciliella, a genus resurrected using DNA evidence.

The lichen forms a rimose-areolate, partly continuous thallus that turns red when tested with potassium hydroxide (K+ red) and contains a green algal photobiont. It produces pale brown to black apothecia (fruiting bodies), and its asci are eight-spored with simple, colourless ellipsoid ascospores (Nylander reported spores 23–34 × 9–15 μm and conidia 7–9 × 1 μm; later work reports conidia about 7–11 μm long).

It typically grows on siliceous or volcanic rocks in open habitats, often on exposed, roughly horizontal outcrop faces, and is reported mainly from the Mediterranean region (with many collections from Iran, Armenia, France and Greece), extending to areas such as Great Britain, the Canary Islands, Tunisia, Syria, the Ural Mountains, and North America, though some records have not been confirmed with DNA data. Molecular studies indicate that specimens identified as A. intermutans comprise several genetically distinct lineages, and broader revisions are planned to determine which lineage represents A. intermutans in the strict sense.
