= Claurouxia =

Scientific classification
- Domain: Eukaryota
- Kingdom: Fungi
- Division: Ascomycota
- Class: Lecanoromycetes
- Order: Lecanorales
- Family: Lecanoraceae
- Genus: Claurouxia; D.Hawksw. (1988)

Type species
- Claurouxia chalybeioides (Nyl.) D.Hawksw. (1988)

Genus of fungi

Claurouxia is a genus of lichen-forming fungi in the family Lecanoraceae. This is a monotypic genus, containing the single species Claurouxia chalybeioides.

The genus name of Claurouxia is in honour of F.J. Georges Clauzade (1914–2002) a French teacher and botanist (Mycology and Lichenology) and Claude Roux a French botanist and geologist, who had, together, in 1984 proposed the generic name Pseudolecidea, an invalid homonym, for the same species.

The genus was circumscribed by David Leslie Hawksworth in Syst. Ascom. Vol. 7 on page 65 in 1988.
