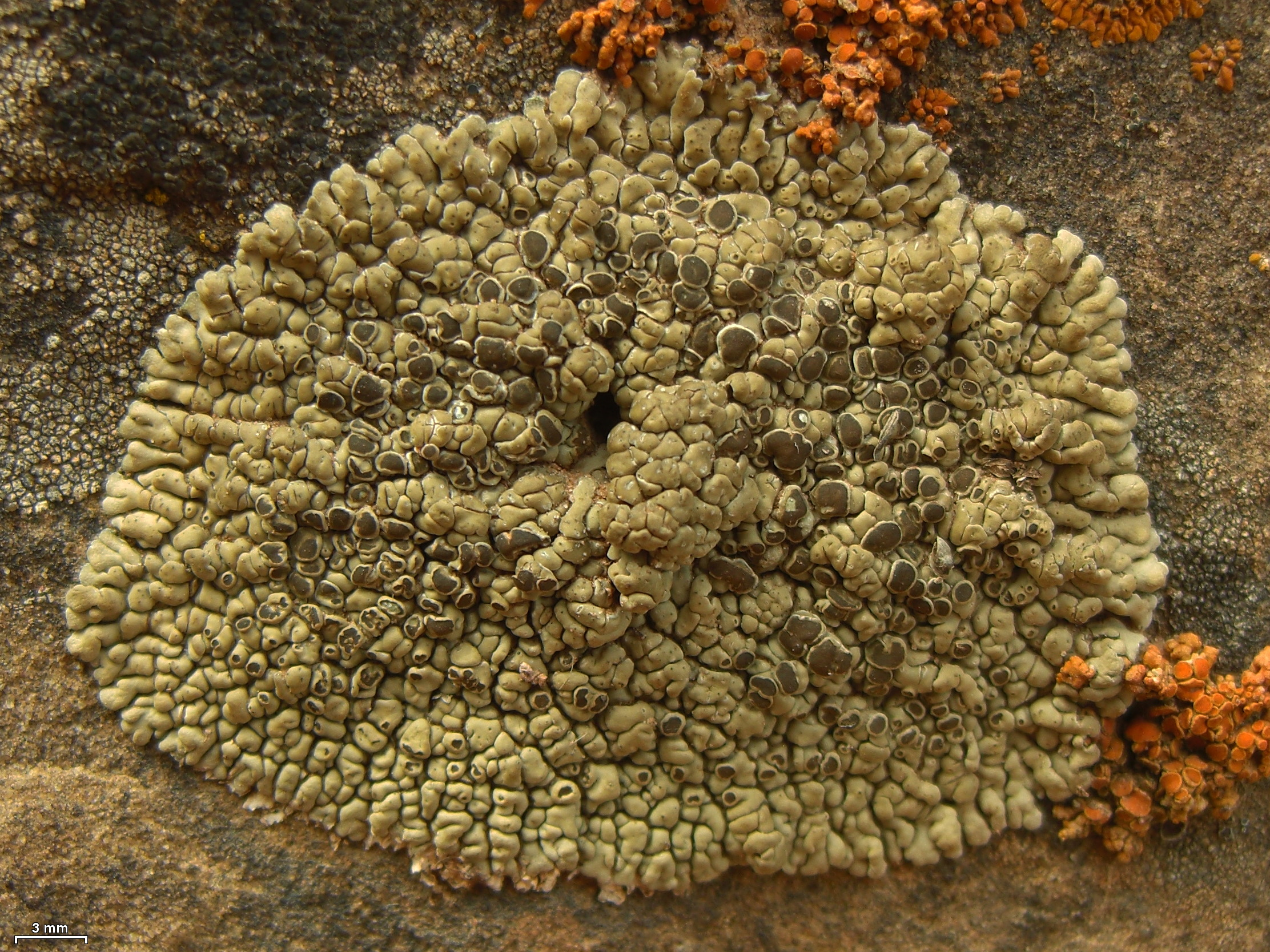
- On sandstone near Canyonlands, Utah

Scientific classification
- Kingdom: Fungi
- Division: Ascomycota
- Class: Lecanoromycetes
- Order: Pertusariales
- Family: Megasporaceae
- Genus: Lobothallia
- Species: L. praeradiosa

Binomial name
- Lobothallia praeradiosa (Nyl.) Hafellner (1991)

Synonyms
- Lecanora praeradiosa Nyl. (1884); Squamaria praeradiosa (Nyl.) H.Olivier (1909); Placodium praeradiosum (Nyl.) Szatala (1930); Aspicilia praeradiosa (Nyl.) Poelt & Leuckert (1973); Lecanora bogdoensis Tomin (1926)

= Lobothallia praeradiosa =

Species of lichen-forming fungus

Lobothallia praeradiosa is a species of saxicolous (rock-dwelling)crustose lichen in the family Megalosporaceae. It forms a pale, radiating crust with distinct marginal lobes, and develops pale, flat fruiting bodies (apothecia). The species grows on sun-exposed rock in dry habitats and is reported from a broad range across Eurasia and North America.

== Taxonomy ==
It was first described as a new species in 1884 by the Finnish lichenologist William Nylander, as Lecanora praeradiosa, based on material collected on siliceous-calcareous rock near Budapest (by Hugó Lojka), and characterized by a pale ochre, radiating thallus and pale, flat apothecia (fruiting bodies) with eight simple, ellipsoid ascospores about 9–11 × 7 μm. The species was later reclassified in the genera Squamaria, Placodium, and Aspicilia. Josef Hafellner recombined it in Lobothallia in 1991.

A modern revision of Lobothallia by Paukov and co-authors (2019) included L. praeradiosa among the core, lobed members of the genus and tested its relationships using DNA sequence data. In their internal transcribed spacer phylogeny, material identified as Lecanora bogdoënsis (a name later used in Placolecanora and Protoparmeliopsis) was recovered within the L. praeradiosa lineage with strong support, rather than as a separate species. On morphological and chemical grounds, Paukov et al. concluded that L. bogdoënsis does not belong with Lecanora-like taxa characterised by usnic acid or xanthones, and instead matches Lobothallia in having small spores and short conidia. Because the sequenced material from the type region of L. bogdoënsis also agreed in morphology and conidial dimensions with L. praeradiosa, they treated Lecanora bogdoënsis as a synonym of Lobothallia praeradiosa.

== Description ==
Lobothallia praeradiosa is a placodioid, radiating crust with distinct lobes at its margins. The thallus is usually closely attached to the rock surface, but the outermost 1–4 mm of the lobes may be less firmly adherent. In specimens overgrowing other lichens or mosses, older parts can sometimes lift away and resemble the more loosely attached L. alphoplaca. The lobes are flat to moderately convex and grey to distinctly brownish, often with the side margins of lobes tending to run more or less parallel in the most closely attached parts of the thallus.

== Habitat and distribution ==
Lobothallia praeradiosa has a broad Eurasian range. It is saxicolous in dry habitats, forming radiating thalli on sun-exposed rock surfaces. In Nepal, Lobothallia praeradiosa has been reported from 4,000 to 4,500 m elevation in a compilation of published records; this reported range extends above the tree line used in the study. It also occurs in northwestern North America.
