= Oxneriaria =

Scientific classification
- Kingdom: Fungi
- Division: Ascomycota
- Class: Lecanoromycetes
- Order: Pertusariales
- Family: Megasporaceae
- Genus: Oxneriaria; S.Y.Kondr. & Lőkös (2017)

Type species
- Oxneriaria mashiginensis (Zahlbr.) S.Y.Kondr. & Lőkös (2017)

Genus of lichens

Oxneriaria is a genus of lichen-forming fungi in the family Megasporaceae. It has nine species, all of which are saxicolous (rock-dwelling), crustose lichens. Oxneriaria is morphologically similar to Aspicilia, but differs from this genus in its mostly radiating thallus with either a wrinkled or lobate zone around the margins, in its generally smaller ascospores, and in the presence of the lichen product substictic acid. Species in the genus have a polar and arctic–alpine distribution.

== Taxonomy ==
The genus was circumscribed in 2017 by Sergey Kondratyuk and László Lőkös to contain species formerly in the Aspicilia mashiginensis species group. This species, now the type of the genus, was first described scientifically by Alexander Zahlbruckner as Lecanora mashiginensis. The genus name honours Ukrainian lichenologist Alfred Oxner, who, according to the authors, "provided important contribution [sic] to taxonomy of aspicilioid lichens and to biodiversity of polar lichens".

== Description ==
Oxneriaria lichens form crust-like thalli that can vary from evenly cracked patches to rosettes with a radiating, wrinkled or lobed outer zone. In some species the surface is distinctly zoned, with the outer parts forming branch-like or tree-like aggregations. The thallus may produce powdery soredia or small bud-like isidia for asexual reproduction, though these are absent in some species. Beneath the main body there is usually a dark to black margin of fungal tissue (hypothallus), though this can sometimes be pale or missing. The outer cortex and algal layer are well developed, and the thallus attaches to the substrate through fungal filaments extending from the medulla.

The fruiting bodies (apothecia) are of the aspicilioid or lecanorine type: at first immersed in the thallus, later becoming slightly raised and often clustered towards the centre. Their discs are typically flat or shallowly concave, sometimes dusted with a whitish coating (pruina). The apothecial wall (true exciple) is usually weakly developed. Inside, the spore-bearing layer contains simple paraphyses (supporting filaments) and asci that most often hold eight ascospores, though occasionally fewer. The ascospores are colourless, single-celled, and range from ellipsoid to nearly spherical in shape.

Asexual spores (conidia) are also produced; they are slender and rod-shaped, straight or slightly curved. Chemical analysis shows that members of this genus characteristically contain substictic acid. The group differs from the related genus Aspicilia by its smaller spore size, the wrinkled or lobed margins of its thallus, and its occurrence mainly in polar and high-alpine regions, as well as its distinct position in the family Megasporaceae according to molecular phylogeny.

== Species ==
As of September 2025, Species Fungorum (in the Catalogue of Life) accept nine species of Oxneriaria.

- Oxneriaria dendroplaca (H.Magn.) S.Y.Kondr. & Lőkös (2017)
- Oxneriaria haeyrenii (H.Magn.) S.Y.Kondr. & Lőkös (2017)
- Oxneriaria mashiginensis (Zahlbr.) S.Y.Kondr. & Lőkös (2017)
- Oxneriaria nikrapensis (Darb.) S.Y.Kondr. & Lőkös (2017)
- Oxneriaria pakistanica M.S.Iqbal, Usman, K.Habib & Khalid (2023) – Pakistan
- Oxneriaria permutata (Zahlbr.) S.Y.Kondr. & Lőkös (2017)
- Oxneriaria rivulicola (H.Magn.) S.Y.Kondr. & Lőkös (2017)
- Oxneriaria supertegens (Arnold) S.Y.Kondr. & Lőkös (2017)
- Oxneriaria verruculosa (Kremp.) S.Y.Kondr. & Lőkös (2017)
- Oxneriaria virginea (Hue) S.Y.Kondr. & Lőkös (2017)
