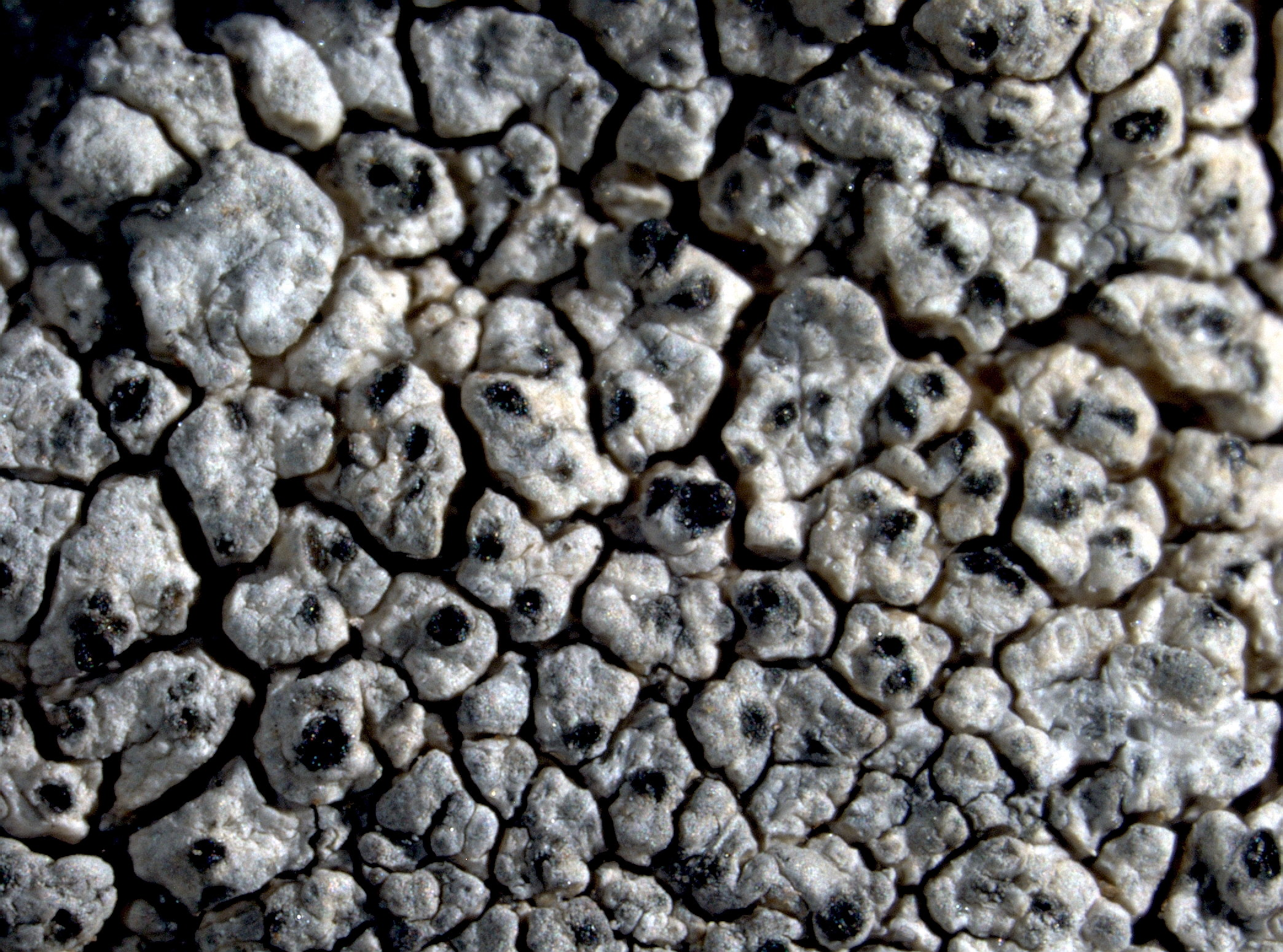
- Aspilidea myrinii

Scientific classification
- Kingdom: Fungi
- Division: Ascomycota
- Class: Lecanoromycetes
- Order: Pertusariales
- Family: Megasporaceae
- Genus: Aspilidea; Hafellner (2001)

Type species
- Aspilidea myrinii (Fr.) Hafellner (2001)

Species
- A. myrinii A. subadunans

= Aspilidea =

Genus of lichen-forming fungi

Aspilidea is a genus of rock-dwelling crustose lichens in the family Megasporaceae (order Pertusariales). It was introduced for the species Aspilidea myrinii, but a five-locus phylogenetic study recovered two distinct taxa in the genus and treated Aspilidea as an early-diverging lineage within Megasporaceae. In the same study, all North American records previously attributed to A. myrinii were found to be misidentifications, with many representing a second species, Aspilidea subadunans.

== Taxonomy ==
The genus was introduced by Josef Hafellner for A. myrinii in 2001. In a five-locus phylogenetic study of Megasporaceae, Wheeler and colleagues (2024) recovered Aspilidea as an early-diverging lineage within that family (near the boundary with Ochrolechiaceae) and treated it as part of Megasporaceae, while noting that its placement is less clear-cut than that of several other genera and may be revisited as sampling improves. Earlier molecular work excluded Aspilidea from Megasporaceae, while noting a close relationship. Wheeler and colleagues (2024) recovered Aspilidea as an early-diverging lineage within Megasporaceae with high support and included it in the family, while noting that its placement may change as sampling improves.

== Description ==
Species of Aspilidea are saxicolous (rock-dwelling) crustose lichens with pale thalli that contain norstictic acid and produce short bacilliform conidia. Anatomically, Aspilidea is unusual within Megasporaceae in showing a euamyloid (I+ blue) hymenium, and it has historically been considered intermediate in some characters between Megasporaceae and Ochrolechiaceae. The two species are similar chemically (norstictic acid; short bacilliform conidia), but A. subadunans differs from A. myrinii in having elevated apothecia and narrower ascospores.

== Habitat and distribution ==
Aspilidea species occur on siliceous rocks in cold northern habitats. In North America, A. subadunans is known from Alaska to Newfoundland, while reports of A. myrinii from North America represent misidentifications; some European records have also proved to be misidentified.

== Species ==
- Aspilidea myrinii (Fr.) Hafellner (2001)
- Aspilidea subadunans (Vain.) T.B.Wheeler, J.W.McCarthy & Fryday (2024)
