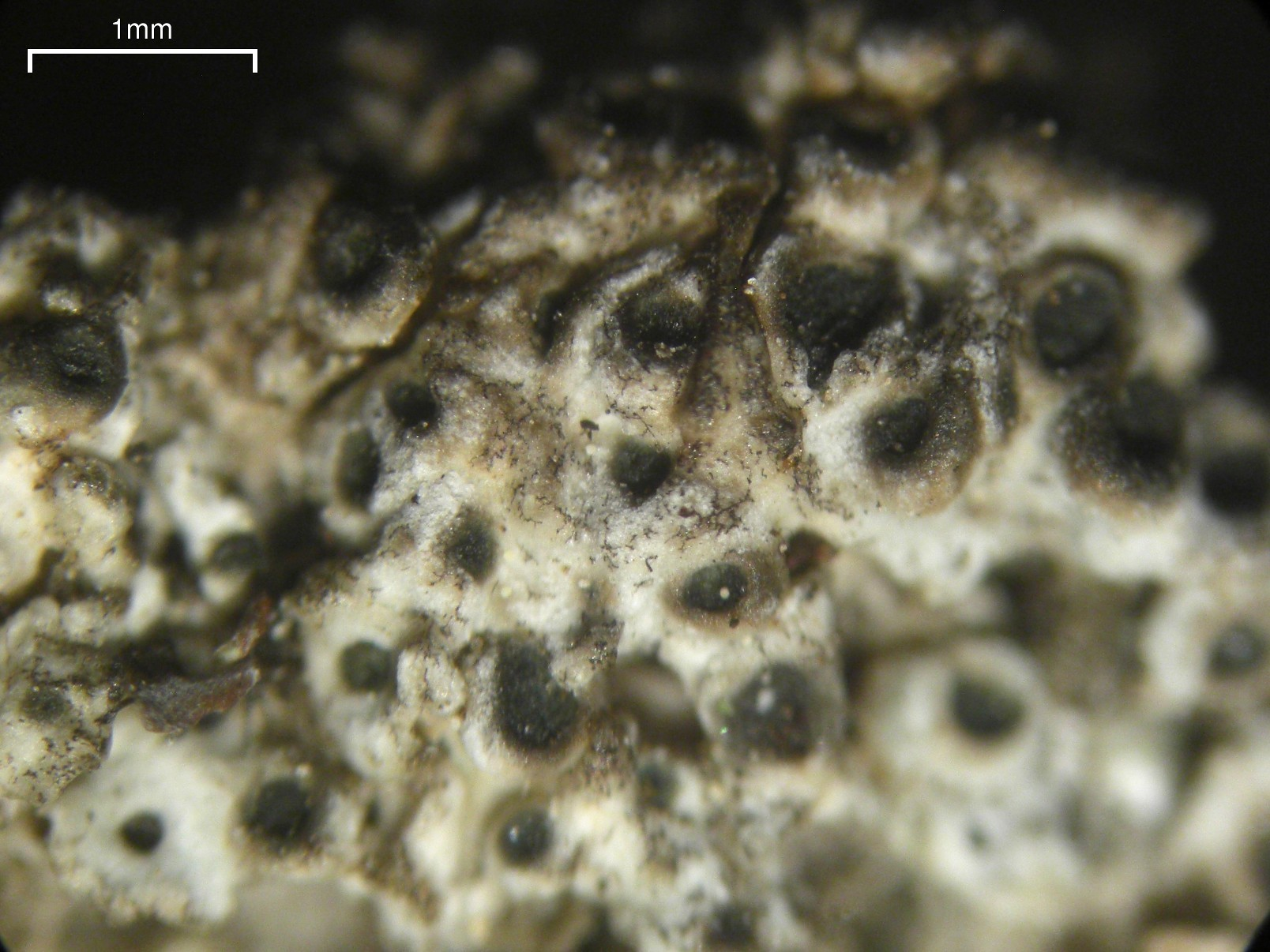
- Close-up of thallus of Megaspora verrucosa with half-hidden (aspicilioid) apothecia

Scientific classification
- Kingdom: Fungi
- Division: Ascomycota
- Class: Lecanoromycetes
- Order: Pertusariales
- Family: Megasporaceae
- Genus: Megaspora (Clauzade & Cl.Roux) Hafellner & V.Wirth (1987)

Type species
- Megaspora verrucosa (Ach.) Arcadia & A.Nordin (2012)

Species
- M. cretacea M. iranica M. rimisorediata M. verrucosa

Synonyms
- Aspicilia subgen. Megaspora Clauzade & Cl.Roux (1984)

= Megaspora =

Genus of lichens

Megaspora is a genus of lichen-forming fungi in the family Megasporaceae. It contains four species of crustose lichens that typically grow on soil, bryophytes (mosses and liverworts), or plant litter on chalky substrates.

== Taxonomy ==
The genus was circumscribed by Georges Clauzade and Claude Roux in 1984 with M. verrucosa assigned as the type species.

In 2012, Linda in Arcadia and Anders Nordin proposed to conserve the name Megaspora verrucosa (Ach.) Arcadia & A.Nordin against M. verrucosa Hafellner & V.Wirth due to taxonomic confusion stemming from historical errors in the original basionym citation. The original introduction of Aspicilia subg. Megaspora erroneously cited Lecanora verrucosa Ach. as the basionym, when it should have been Urceolaria verrucosa Ach. This misattribution led to the invalid introduction of the name Megaspora verrucosa by Hafellner & Wirth based on the wrong species. To rectify this and prevent future taxonomic issues, the proposal suggested adopting M. verrucosa (Ach.) Arcadia & A.Nordin based on U. verrucosa Ach. as the conserved name, which the Nomenclature Committee for Fungi eventually recommended accepting after initially considering rejection.

== Description ==
Megaspora is a genus of crustose lichens, meaning they form a crust-like growth on their substrate. The thallus (lichen body) is non-lobate (lacking distinct lobes) and can appear somewhat powdery (pruinose). The photobiont, or photosynthetic partner, in this lichen is chlorococcoid, referring to a type of green algae.

The reproductive structures of Megaspora are apothecia, which are deeply immersed in the thalline warts (small, wart-like structures on the thallus). The apothecia have a thalline margin, a rim composed of thallus tissue. The true exciple, or the outer layer surrounding the apothecia, is thin and either colourless or pale straw-coloured, consisting of tightly packed, vertically aligned hyphae (fungal filaments).

The epithecium, the uppermost layer of the apothecium, is brown-green and turns bright green when treated with a nitrogen-based reagent (N+). The hymenium, the spore-bearing layer, is colourless and turns blue with iodine (I+). The hypothecium, the layer beneath the hymenium, is also colourless. The hamathecium, which contains the paraphyses (sterile filaments among the asci), is richly branched and interconnected (anastomosing) without swollen tips, and is strongly conglutinated (stuck together).

The asci (spore-producing cells) are of the Biatora-type, containing 4 to 8 spores, and are clavate (club-shaped) or cylindric-clavate, with thin walls except towards the apex. The asci have a pale tholus (a thickened area at the tip) that reacts faintly with potassium/iodine (K/I). The ascospores are large, aseptate (without internal divisions), globose (spherical) to shortly ellipsoidal, colourless, and have uniformly thickened walls.

Conidiomata (structures producing asexual spores) have not been observed in this genus. No lichen products have been detected through thin-layer chromatography.

== Habitat ==
Megaspora lichens typically grow on soil, bryophytes (mosses and liverworts), or plant litter on calcareous (chalky) substrates. They are rarely found growing on bark (corticolous).

== Species ==
- Megaspora cretacea Gasparyan, Zakeri & Aptroot (2016) – Armenia
- Megaspora iranica Haji Moniri & S.Y.Kondr. (2017) – Iran
- Megaspora rimisorediata Valadb. & A.Nordin (2011) – Iran
- Megaspora verrucosa (Ach.) Arcadia & A.Nordin (2012)
