= Antidea =

Scientific classification
- Kingdom: Fungi
- Division: Ascomycota
- Class: Lecanoromycetes
- Order: Pertusariales
- Family: Megasporaceae
- Genus: Antidea; T.B.Wheeler (2024)
- Species: A. brucei

Binomial name
- Antidea brucei (Owe-Larss. & A.Nordin) T.B.Wheeler (2024)

Synonyms
- Aspicilia brucei Owe-Larss. & A.Nordin (2007)

Single-species fungal genus

Antidea is a fungal genus in the family Megasporaceae (order Pertusariales). It comprises the single species Antidea brucei, a crustose lichen that forms small gray patches of tightly packed tiles on siliceous rocks. The species was originally described as Aspicilia brucei in 2007 from California, but DNA studies showed it represented an early-diverging lineage within Megasporaceae, leading to its placement in a new genus in 2024. Known primarily from mid-elevation forested sites in southwestern North America, the species has also been reported from parts of Europe.

== Taxonomy ==
Antidea was established in 2024 by Tim Wheeler to accommodate a single, previously described species, making the genus monospecific (containing one species). In Wheeler and coauthors' multigene phylogenetic study of Megasporaceae, the species formerly known as Aspicilia brucei was recovered as a distinct, strongly supported lineage near the base of the family tree; on that basis, it was segregated into its own genus.

In addition to DNA evidence, Antidea was diagnosed as "Aspicilia-like" in overall appearance and in producing norstictic acid, but differing from similar Aspicilia species by having smaller ascospores and shorter conidia, along with its distinct molecular sequences. The type (name-bearing) species of the genus is Antidea brucei (Owe‑Larss. & A. Nordin) T. B. Wheeler, based on the basionym Aspicilia brucei published in the 2007 work Lichen Flora of the Greater Sonoran Desert Region (vol. 3). The genus name derives from Latin ("to come before" / "in the past"), referring to the lineage's early-diverging position within Megasporaceae. The species epithet honors Bruce Ryan "for his substantial contributions to the lichenological exploration of the Sonoran Desert".

== Description ==
Because Antidea is monospecific, the genus is characterized by the features of its only species, Antidea brucei. It is a crustose, areolate lichen, forming patches roughly 1.5–8 cm (0.6–3.1 in) across. The thallus is made up of tightly packed, mostly angular "tiles" (areoles) separated by narrow cracks; these areoles are typically about 0.4–1 mm wide (occasionally smaller or up to about 2 mm). The upper surface is usually gray to gray‑white, sometimes with a faint greenish cast, and only rarely shows warmer tones (ochre to brownish). A black marginal prothallus is often absent but can appear as a very narrow border.

The reproductive structures are typically numerous. The apothecia are aspicilioid (disk-like fruiting bodies typical of Aspicilia and allies), usually very small (commonly 0.2–0.4 mm wide) and often occurring one to a few per areole. Their disks are black to dark brown‑black, often slightly shiny, and commonly concave; the surrounding thalline margin is thin and may form a narrow pale rim around the disk. Microscopically, the hymenium is relatively short for the group, and the paraphyses are non‑moniliform to somewhat moniliform (not strongly "beaded" at the tips, though the upper cells may be slightly swollen). The asci are 8‑spored; the ascospores are hyaline, single‑celled, and ellipsoid, typically around 10–13 × 5–8 μm (rarely tending more rounded). Pycnidia may be present; the conidia are short and threadlike, typically about 6–10 μm long.

Chemically, A. brucei contains norstictic acid as its main secondary metabolite; some specimens also contain connorstictic acid and/or hyposalazinic acid. Spot tests reported for the thallus are consistent with this chemistry; in particular, K+ (red) and P+ (orange), with C− and iodine negative in the cortex and medulla. In regional comparisons, A. brucei can resemble gray Aspicilia such as A. cinerea (and in older treatments was discussed in that context), but it is distinguished by the combination of small spores, unusually short conidia, and its paraphysis form—traits highlighted again when the genus Antidea was erected.

== Habitat and distribution ==
Antidea brucei grows on hard, siliceous rocks, including basalt, and has been reported as most often occurring in forested settings and partly shaded sites. In the original North American treatment, it was recorded from mid‑elevation localities, about 1,250–1,810 m (4,100–5,940 ft) in southern California (including Riverside, San Diego, Tulare, and Tuolumne counties) and from Guadalupe Island off Baja California, Mexico.

Although the species was described from California, it has also been reported from parts of Europe, specifically France and the Czech Republic, extending its known distribution beyond the southwestern North American region where it was first characterized.
