= Megaspora rimisorediata =

Scientific classification
- Kingdom: Fungi
- Division: Ascomycota
- Class: Lecanoromycetes
- Order: Pertusariales
- Family: Megasporaceae
- Genus: Megaspora
- Species: M. rimisorediata

Binomial name
- Megaspora rimisorediata Valadb. & A.Nordin (2011)
- Holotype: Tonele Reno, Ilam, Iran

Species of lichen

Megaspora rimisorediata is a species of crustose lichen in the family Megasporaceae. Found in Iran, it was described as a new species in 2011. It is distinguished by its distinctive network of dark blue-green powdery granules that develop along cracks in the lichen's surface, which gives the species its name meaning 'crack-sorediate'. The lichen grows primarily on oak bark in mountainous steppe regions across northern Iran, where it appears to grow better during wetter winter months than in summer.

== Taxonomy ==
Megaspora rimisorediata was described as new to science in 2011 by Tahereh Valadbeigi and Anders Nordin. The genus Megaspora, once treated within Aspicilia, is characterised by relatively large, thick-walled ascospores and apothecia sunken into wart-like swellings of the thallus. Molecular phylogenetics analysis of nuclear rDNA ITS sequences placed M. rimisorediata as the closest known relative of M. verrucosa, while still differing in more than 50 nucleotide positions.

The holotype was collected in western Iran at Tonele Reno, Ilam province, about 2,000 m elevation, on the bark of Persian oak (Quercus brantii), on 12 July 2009 (specimen Valadbeigi 10250; deposited in TARI). The specific epithet, rimisorediata, refers to the species' distinctive production of soredia along cracks in the thallus. In practical terms, it can be told from M. verrucosa by its sorediate thallus and the rarity of fruiting bodies; M. verrucosa typically lacks soralia and bears abundant apothecia.

== Description ==
The lichen forms a thin, cracked (rimose) crust up to about 4 cm across, coloured pale ochre to bluish grey. Its most conspicuous feature is the network of powdery reproductive granules (soredia) that develop along the sides of the cracks; these dark blue-green, roughly 50–70-micrometre (μm) soredia can coalesce into a dense mesh over the thallus. The upper cortex is about 30 μm thick and contains abundant calcium oxalate crystals. A characteristic green pigment ("Caesiocinerea-green") is present in the uppermost tissues and is evident in standard microchemical tests. The internal photobiont is a green alga with cells about 12–17 μm in diameter. Thin-layer chromatography detected no lichen secondary metabolites, and routine chemical spot tests (K, C, Pd) are negative.

Fruiting bodies (apothecia) are rare. When present, they begin immersed and later appear as slightly raised, irregular discs up to about 1.5 mm wide, ringed by a thalline margin. The spore-bearing layer (hymenium) is to about 150 μm tall; asci are of the Aspicilia-type and contain 4–8 colourless, simple ascospores measuring roughly 35–42 × 23–27 μm (with smaller and larger extremes noted). Asexual spores (conidia) are also produced in immersed pycnidia; they are rod-shaped, about 5.5–8 × 1 μm.

== Habitat and distribution ==
Megaspora rimisorediata is primarily corticolous, growing on the bark of scattered trees—especially Quercus brantii and Q. castaneifolia, and also Juniperus—in steppe vegetation on dry mountain slopes. It is occasionally found over mosses or on calcareous (lime-rich) rocks. Field observations suggest seasonal effects on growth and reproduction: specimens gathered in winter were generally larger and bore more abundant soredia than summer collections from the same sites, consistent with increased moisture favouring thallus expansion.

The species is known to occur only in Iran, with records spread across the northern half of the country from several provinces (including Ilam, Golestan/Gorgan, East Azerbaijan, Gilan, North Khorasan, Kurdistan, Mazandaran, Lorestan, Hamedan, Zanjan, and Chaharmahal-o-Bakhtiari), at roughly 800–2,200 m elevation.
