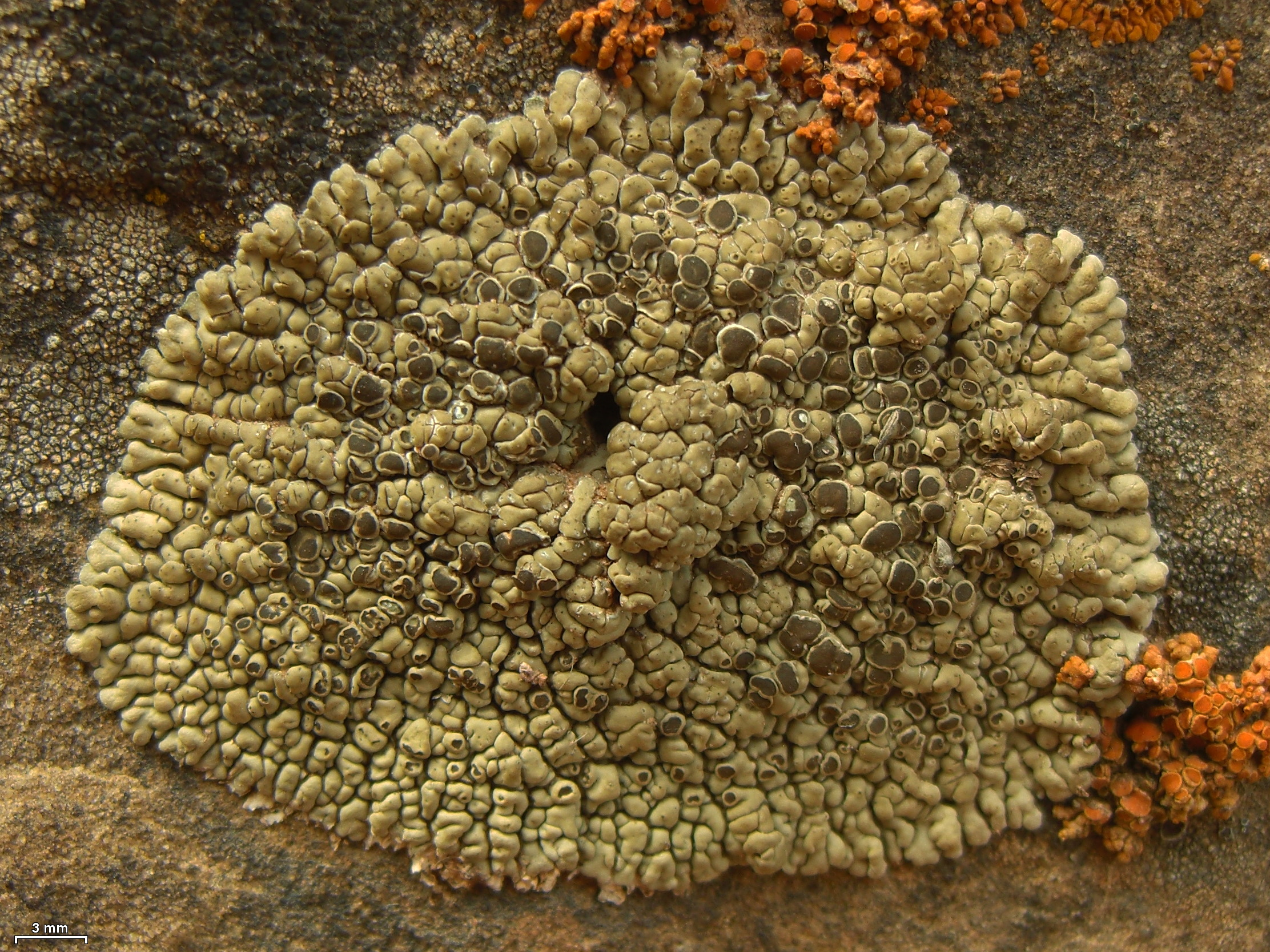
- Lobothallia praeradiosa

Scientific classification
- Kingdom: Fungi
- Division: Ascomycota
- Class: Lecanoromycetes
- Order: Pertusariales
- Family: Megasporaceae
- Genus: Lobothallia (Clauzade & Cl.Roux) Hafellner (1991)

Synonyms
- Aspicilia subgen. Lobothallia Clauzade & Cl.Roux (1984); Protoplacodium Motyka (1995)

= Lobothallia =

Genus of lichen-forming fungi

Lobothallia is a genus of lichen-forming fungi in the family Megasporaceae. Dark brown to black apothecia may be sunken into the surface of the thallus, as indicated in the common name puffed sunken-disk lichen. Originally described as a subgenus of Aspicilia in 1984, Lobothallia was elevated to full genus status in 1991 based on distinctive features including peripheral lobes and small, thin-walled ascospores. The genus was established to clarify a group of rock-dwelling lichens that had previously been classified across several different genera.

The genus is found across multiple continents including Eurasia, North America, and Australia, with the greatest diversity occurring in the semi-arid mountains of Central Asia. These lichens typically grow on exposed rock faces, from low-elevation steppes to high mountain areas above 2,600 meters, and are well-adapted to dry conditions. As of 2026, the genus includes 38 recognized species, with several new species recently discovered in Pakistan and China.

== Taxonomy ==
Lobothallia was first proposed as a subgenus of the genus Aspicilia by Georges Clauzade and Claude Roux in 1984. They circumscribed the taxon as a morphologically coherent group of saxicolous (rock-dwelling) crustose lichens whose thallus forms conspicuous peripheral lobes while the central portion breaks into cracked or low‑verruculose areoles that lack papillae. In section, the apothecial epithecium gives a negative or only very faint positive reaction in the nitrite (N) spot‑test, and the hymenium is composed of predominantly simple (unbranched) paraphyses. The authors further separated the group from other Aspicilia lineages by the possession of small, thin‑walled, non‑haloed ascospores measuring 10–15 × 6–8 μm, in contrast to the very large thick‑walled spores of their subgenus Megaspora and the papillose, chalky thallus with branched paraphyses that define Pachyothallia.

They selected Aspicilia alphoplaca as the type species of Lobothallia and, in the same paper, assigned A. melanaspis, A. praeradiosa and A. subcircinata—together with several names then treated under Circinaria and Lecanora—to the new subgenus. By doing so, Clauzade and Roux effectively clarified a suite of taxa that had long been shuffled between disparate genera, offering a diagnosis based on thallus architecture and ascus anatomy rather than on chemical or ecological convenience. Josef Hafellner elevated Lobothallia to distinct genus status in 1991 as part of a reorganization of Aspicilia and related genera.

== Description ==
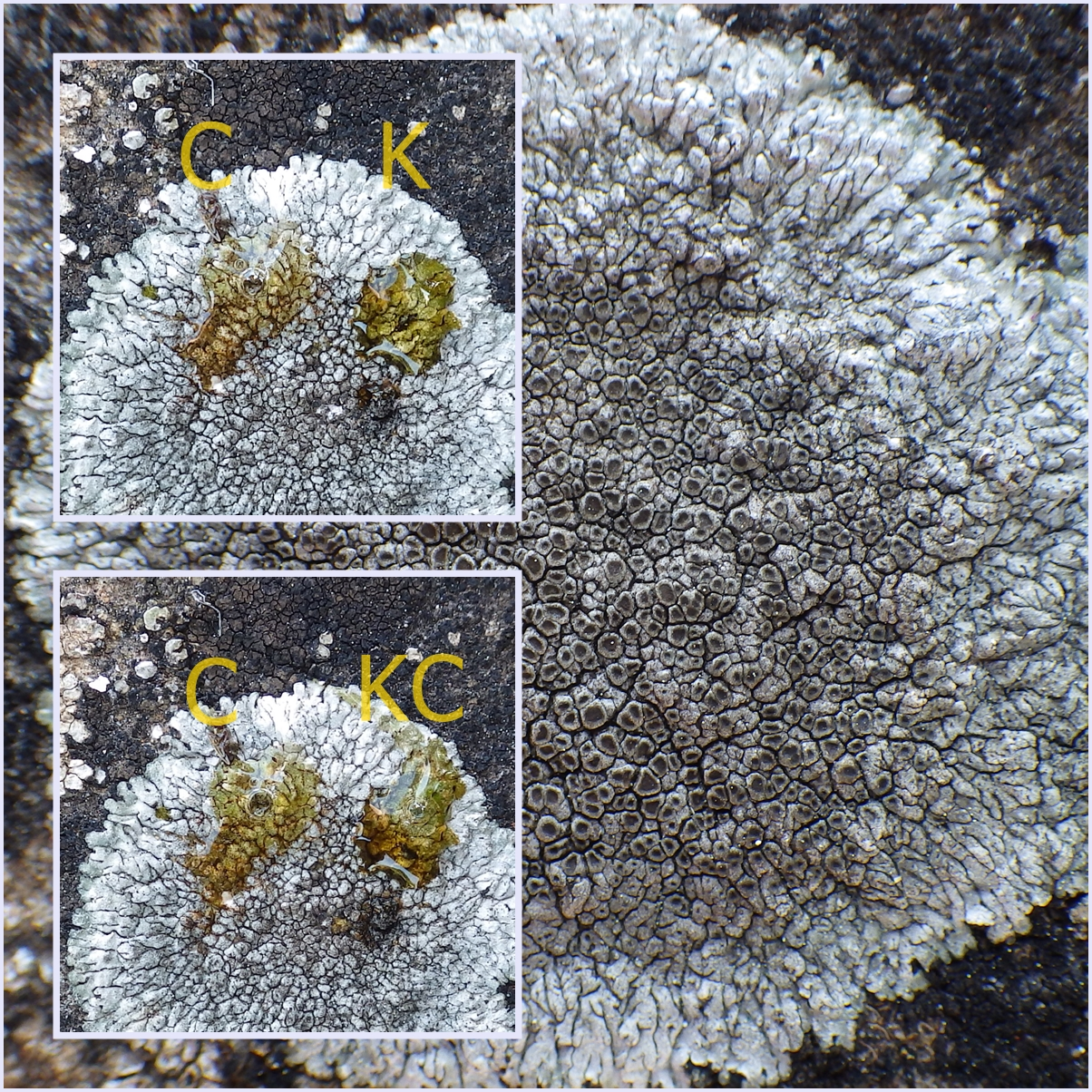
Lobothallia radiosa in Portugal; inset images show the spot test reactions C, K, and KC

The thallus of Lobothallia ranges from a tight crust that clings to the rock to a more leaf-like, lobed rosette. It is built from angular, tile-like patches (areoles) that radiate outward; the outermost ones spread into plate-shaped lobes, a form called placodioid; thalli grow to 3–5 cm (1.2–2.0 in). Unlike many foliose lichens, the underside lacks distinct rhizines (the root-like anchoring strands). The photobiont partner is green alga from the genus Trebouxia.

Fruiting bodies (apothecia) appear early as small, cup-shaped pits sunk in the thallus. With age they rise to sit on the surface, flatten, and occasionally develop a short stalk. Each apothecium is ringed by a thick collar of thallus tissue (the thalline margin) that may become wavy, while the exposed disc turns reddish-brown to black and can warp in mature specimens. Microscopy reveals an olive- to red-brown epithecium that either shows no reaction or a faint green tint to the standard nitrate test (N–/N+). The supporting paraphyses are mostly unbranched but swell into bead-like tips. Inside Aspicilia-type asci sit eight broadly ellipsoidal, thin-walled ascospores—small for the Megasporaceae—and the lichen also produces minute ellipsoidal to rod-shaped conidia for asexual dispersal.

== Habitat and distribution ==
The widely distributed genus is represented in Eurasia, North Africa, Central America, western North America, and Australia. Species of Lobothallia are overwhelmingly saxicolous, occupying exposed faces of siliceous or calcareous bedrock ranging from low‑elevation steppe outcrops (roughly 200 m elevation) to high‑montane belts above 2,600 m. The genus is characteristically northern‑hemispheric, with its greatest diversity recorded in the semi‑arid mountains of Central Asia—especially the Altai system where 12 taxa occur—and in the Mediterranean–Alpine arc; by contrast, only five species reach Fennoscandia and the Urals, and very few extend into boreal substrates beyond 50° N.

Substratum specificity is broad in Lobothallia: some taxa favour basic limestones, others siliceous schists, gneiss or serpentinite, and several tolerate heavily weathered desert sandstones. Thalli are highly adapted to xeric microclimates—lobes in many species are thick, pruinose and tightly appressed, reducing water loss under intense insolation—yet a few in the genus exploit very different niches. The freshwater specialist L. hydrocharis forms extensive placodioid crusts in the splash zone of shaded mountain streams on Sardinia, where it structures a distinctive rheophytic lichen community rich in parasitic and epilichenic interactions; true submersion is avoided, but thalli are periodically inundated by water. At the opposite moisture extreme, several Asian members (e.g. L. brachyloba and L. zogtii) inhabit fully insolated desert pavements where summer surface temperatures exceed 50 °C (122 °F). Ecological plasticity also includes a transient lichenicolous (lichen-dwelling) phase: L. epiadelpha initiates development on the thalli of Circinaria maculata before overgrowing the host and becoming free‑living, while certain chemotypes of L. radiosa begin as facultative parasites on Aspicilia (in the loose sense)

Recent discoveries have broadened the known range of the genus into the Himalayas and Hindu Kush. Four species new to science—L. elobulata, L. iqbalii, L. pakistanica and L. pulvinata—were collected on crystalline blocks and thin soil veneers between 1,600 and 3,100 m (5,200 and 10,200 ft) in northern Pakistan, demonstrating that continental Asian lineages extend well into subtropical montane belts. In the neighbouring Margalla Hills, L. densipruinosa colonises sun‑facing conglomerate ledges at roughly 900 m elevation, its dark‑olive discs protected by a dense cortical pruina. China has yielded parallel novelties—L. crenulata, L. lobulata and L. subdiffracta var. rimosa—which, together with previously known taxa, form a well‑supported eastern Asian clade growing on granitic ridges between 1,500 m and 2,400 m.

== Species ==
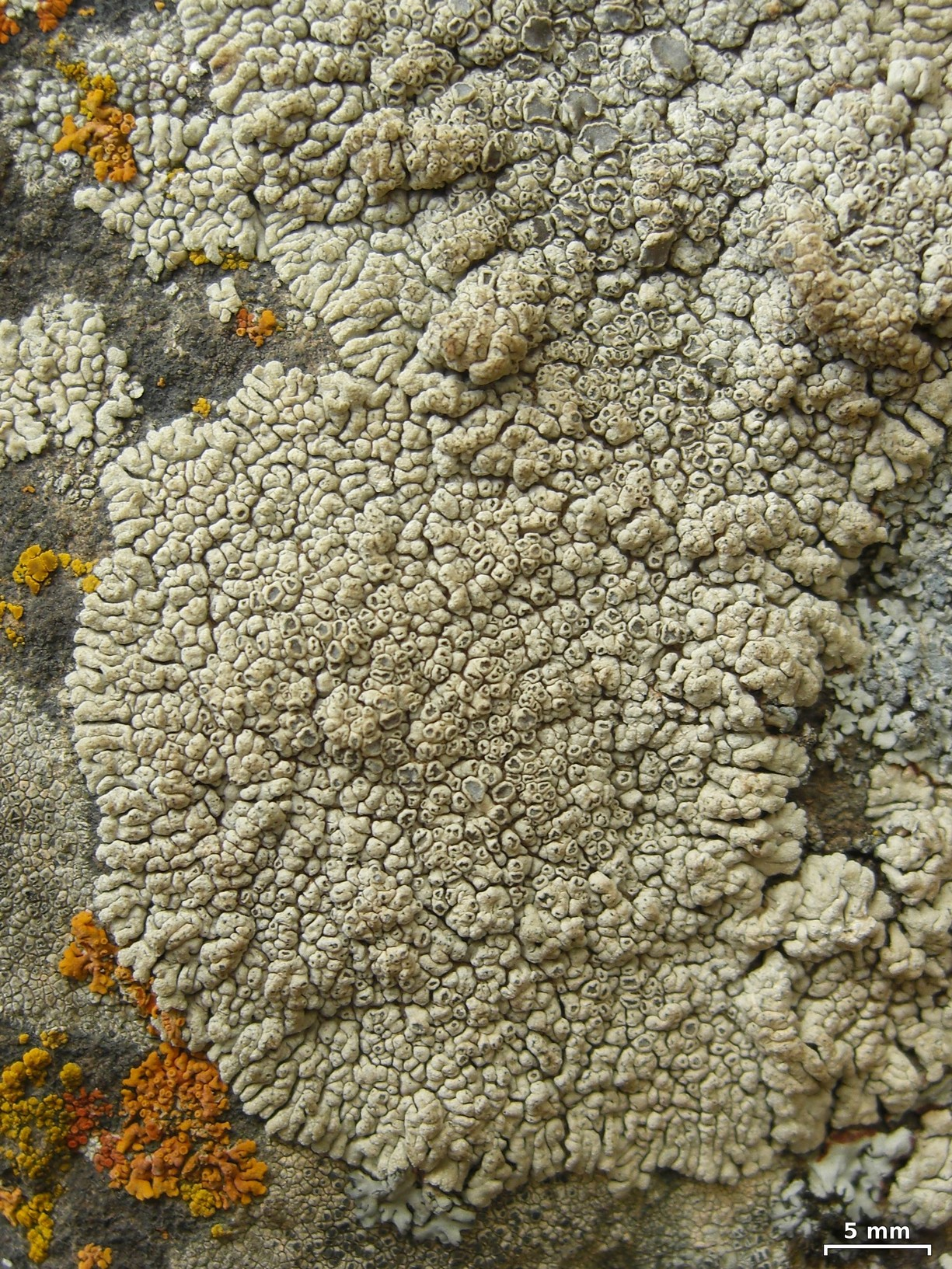
Lobothallia alphoplaca

As of January 2026, Species Fungorum accepts 38 species of Lobothallia.

- Lobothallia alphoplaca (Wahlenb.) Hafellner (1991)
- Lobothallia benzilanensis Lun Wang & Y.Y.Zhang (2025) – China
- Lobothallia brachyloba Paukov & I.V.Frolov (2019)
- Lobothallia chadefaudiana (Cl.Roux) A.Nordin, Cl.Roux & Sohrabi (2012)
- Lobothallia cheresina (Müll.Arg.) A.Nordin, Cl.Roux & Sohrabi (2012)
- Lobothallia complanata Lun Wang & Y.Y.Zhang (2025) – China
- Lobothallia controversa Cl.Roux & A.Nordin (2016)
- Lobothallia crassimarginata Kou & Q.Ren (2013) – China
- Lobothallia crenulata Lun Wang & Y.Y.Zhang (2024) – China
- Lobothallia densipruinosa A.Ashraf, K.Habib & Khalid (2022)
- Lobothallia determinata (H.Magn.) T.B.Wheeler (2024)
- Lobothallia elobulata Zulfiqar, Khalid & Paukov (2022) – Pakistan
- Lobothallia epiadelpha Paukov & A.Nordin (2019)
- Lobothallia farinosa (Flörke) A.Nordin, Savić & Tibell (2010)
- Lobothallia gangwondoana S.Y.Kondr., J.-J.Woo et J.-S.Hur (2020)
- Lobothallia hedinii (H.Magn.) Paukov, A.Nordin & Sohrabi (2019)
- Lobothallia helanensis Kou & Q.Ren (2013) – China
- Lobothallia hydrocharis (Poelt & Nimis) Sohrabi & Nimis (2016)
- Lobothallia iqbalii Zulfiqar, Khalid & Paukov (2022) – Pakistan
- Lobothallia kuminovae (Sedeln.) Sedeln. (2018)
- Lobothallia lacteola (Oxner) Şenkard., Paukov, Davydov & Sohrabi (2019)
- Lobothallia lobulata Lun Wang & Y.Y.Zhang (2024) – China
- Lobothallia melanaspis (Ach.) Hafellner (1991)
- Lobothallia pakistanica Razzaq, Fayyaz, Khalid & Afshan (2022) – Pakistan
- Lobothallia peltastictoides (Hasse) T.B.Wheeler (2024)
- Lobothallia platycarpa (J.Steiner) Paukov (2022)
- Lobothallia polypycnidiata Lun Wang & Y.Y.Zhang (2025) – China
- Lobothallia praeradiosa (Nyl.) Hafellner (1991)
- Lobothallia pseudopruinosa Lun Wang & Y.Y.Zhang (2025) – China
- Lobothallia pruinosa Kou & Q.Ren (2013) – China
- Lobothallia pulchra Lun Wang & Y.Y.Zhang (2025) – China
- Lobothallia pulvinata R.Zulfiqar, M.S.Iqbal, Razzaq & Khalid (2023) – Pakistan
- Lobothallia radiosa (Hoffm.) Hafellner (1991)
- Lobothallia recedens (Taylor) A.Nordin, Savić & Tibell (2010)
- Lobothallia rubra Lun Wang & Y.Y.Zhang (2025) – China
- Lobothallia semisterilis (H.Magn.) Y.Y.Zhang (2020)
- Lobothallia stipitata Lun Wang & Y.Y.Zhang (2025) – China
- Lobothallia subdiffracta (H.Magn.) Paukov (2019)
- Lobothallia uxoris (Werner) Cl.Roux (2022)
- Lobothallia wangii Lun Wang & Y.Y.Zhang (2025) – China
- Lobothallia zogtii Paukov & Davydov (2019)
