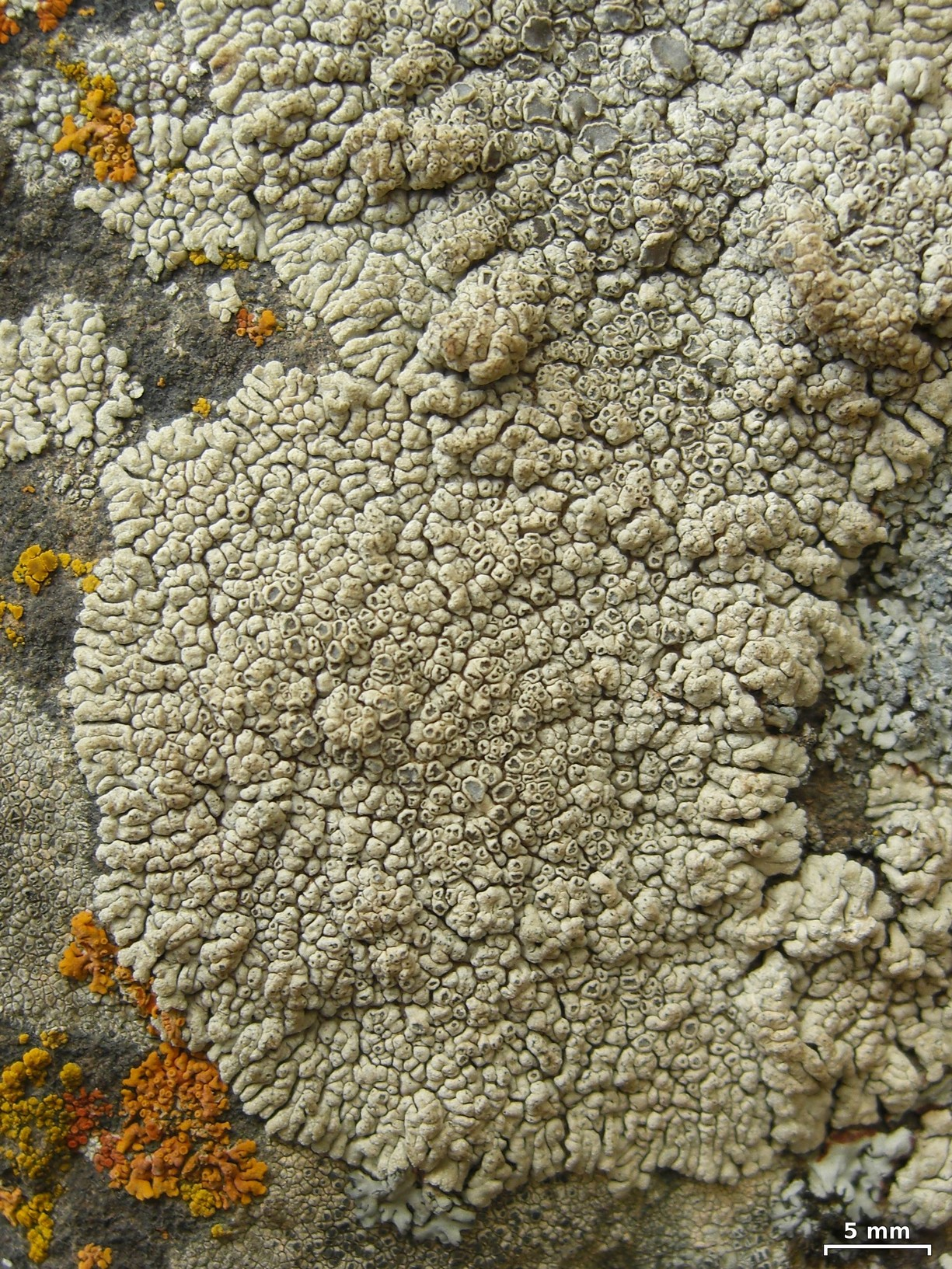

Conservation status
- Secure (NatureServe)

Scientific classification
- Kingdom: Fungi
- Division: Ascomycota
- Class: Lecanoromycetes
- Order: Pertusariales
- Family: Megasporaceae
- Genus: Lobothallia
- Species: L. alphoplaca

Binomial name
- Lobothallia alphoplaca (Wahlenb.) Hafellner (1991)

Synonyms
- Parmelia alphoplaca Wahlenb. (1803); Lecanora alphoplaca (Wahlenb.) Ach. (1810); Lecanora melanaspis var. alphoplaca (Wahlenb.) Th.Fr.; Aspicilia alphoplaca (Wahlenb.) Poelt & Leuckert (1973); Paraplacodium alphoplacum (Wahlenb.) Motyka (1996)

= Lobothallia alphoplaca =

Species of lichen-forming fungus

Lobothallia alphoplaca, the variable sunken disk lichen, is a creamy gray to brown, placodioid areolate lichen that grows on rock in on rock and sometimes moss. It prefers growing on siliceous rocks. It is found in Europe, central Asia, and North America, where it grows in the southwestern deserts to central California. In Nepal, Lobothallia alphoplaca has been reported at 4,400 m elevation in a compilation of published records; this reported range lies above the treeline used in the study.

The center has numerous crowded and deformed apothecia with rims of thallus-like tissue (lecanorine). With dark reddish or grayish brown to black discs. Lichen spot tests on the thallus and apothecia are C−, and KC−, with tests on the cortex K+ red, P+ orange, or K−, P− and on the medulla K+ red, and P+ orange. It produces norstictic acid, constictic acid, or salazinic acid as secondary metabolites.
