= Georges Clauzade =

French botanist and lichenologist

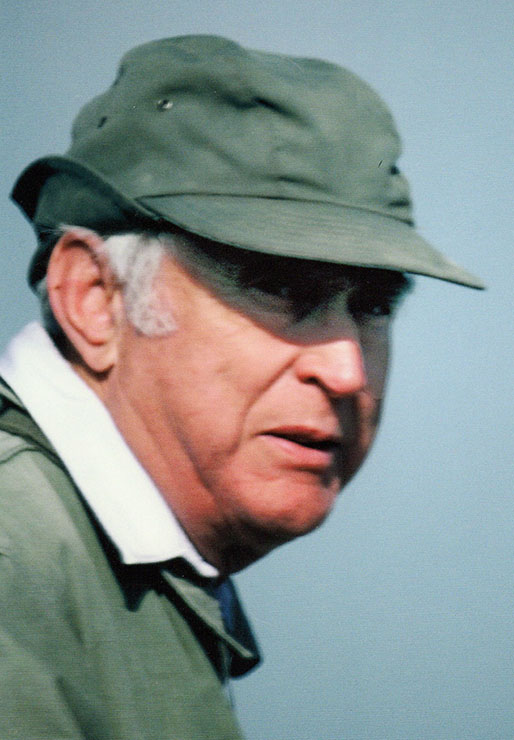
- Born: September 2, 1914; Marseille, France
- Died: July 10, 2002 (aged 87)
- Awards: Prix de Coincy; Acharius Medal (2002)
- Scientific career
- Fields: Botany, lichenology
- Author abbrev. (botany): Clauzade

Ferdinand Joseph Georges Alexandre Clauzade (2 September 1914 – 10 July 2002) was a French botanist and lichenologist. His specialty was the lichen flora of France and the Mediterranean region.

== Biography ==
Georges Clauzade was born in Marseille, France, on 2 September 1914. After obtaining his baccalaureate from Lycée Thiers, he studied at the Faculty of Sciences in Aix-Marseille University. He obtained a bachelor's degree in natural sciences and a master's degree in geology. After passing the final teacher's examination (Agrégé de Sciences Naturelle), he was admitted in 1937 to the faculty of natural sciences.

He became a professor of natural sciences at the Lycée d'Amiens from 1936 to 1939, then in Marseille until 1947. From 1947 to 1966, he taught at the Lycée d'Apt. In parallel he studied botany, in particular the phytosociology of lichens with Maurice Bouly de Lesdain.

Recognized for his expertise, he obtained a four-year secondment at the French National Centre for Scientific Research to work full-time in lichenology. He worked with Yves Rondon, at the faculty of pharmacy in Marseille. During these four years, he studied lichen groups in Provence and wrote in collaboration with Paul Ozenda, Les Lichens, an illustrated flora of French lichens, which was published in 1970. This book became quite popular with European lichenologists and became known as "The Clauzenda". He ended his career as an associate at the normal school in Avignon, from 1970 to 1975.

Starting in 1970, he trained many Mediterranean botanists in lichenology, including Juliette Asta, Claude Roux, and Xavier Llimona. Although he retired from teaching in 1975, he continued scientific pursuits.

Aware of linguistic problems, he advocated the use of Esperanto, which he practiced both written and spoken. He was the first lichenologist to use the international language in his publications. In 2002, he participated in the revision of the Plena ilustrita vortaro de Esperanto ("Complete Illustrated Dictionary of Esperanto").

In 1985, he published with Claude Roux the work Likenoj de okcidenta Eǔropo: ilustrita determinlibro (Lichens of Western Europe: an illustrated book of determination) then in 1989 Nelikeniĝintaj fungoj likenloĝaj: ilustrita determinlibro (Non-lichenized lichenicultural mushrooms) with Roux and Paul Diederich.

== Recognition ==
The Botanical Society of France awarded him the Prix de Coincy in 1974. A Festschrift was dedicated to Clauzade in 1994 on the occasion of his 80th birthday, titled "Hommage scientifique à G. Clauzade. 80e anniversaire".

In 2000, he received the Acharius Medal from the International Association for Lichenology, an award given for lifetime achievements in lichenology. Georges Clauzade wrote 53 articles and four books, largely about lichen flora in southwestern Europe.

=== Eponyms ===
Five genera and several species have been named to honour Clauzade. These include:

Claurouxia D.Hawksw. (1988); Clauzadea Hafellner & Bellem. (1984) Clauzadeana Cl.Roux (1984); Clauzadella Nav.-Ros. & Cl.Roux (1996); Clauzadeomyces Diederich (1994); Arthonia clauzadei B.de Lesd. (1953); Bacidia clauzadei Sérus. & Lambinon (1994); Baeomyces clauzadei B.de Lesd. (1949); Biatorella clauzadeana Llimona (1974); Byssoloma clauzadei Kalb & Vězda (1994); Caloplaca clauzadei B.de Lesd. 1955); Lecania clauzadei B.de Lesd. (1956); Lecanora clauzadei B.de Lesd. (1951); Lichenochora clauzadei Nav.-Ros., Cl.Roux & Llimona (1994); Polycoccum clauzadei Nav.-Ros. & Cl.Roux (1998); Rhizocarpon clauzadei B.de Lesd. (1954); Rinodina clauzadei H.Mayrhofer & Cl.Roux (1984); Stigmidium clauzadei Cl.Roux & Nav.-Ros. (1994); Verrucaria clauzadei B.de Lesd. (1950); and Verrucula clauzadaria Nav.-Ros. & Cl. Roux (2007).

== Selected publications ==
- Clauzade, Georges; Roux, Claude (1984). "Les genres Aspicilia Massal. et Bellemerea Hafellner et Roux". Bulletin de la Société Botanique du Centre-Ouest. Nouvelle Série (in French). 15: 127–141.
- Clauzade, G.; Roux, C. (1975). "Étude écologique et phytosociologique de la végétation lichénique des roches calcaires non altérées dans les régions méditerranéenne et subméditerranéenne du sud-est de la France" [Ecological and phytosociological study of the lichen vegetation of unaltered limestone rocks in the Mediterranean and sub-Mediterranean regions of south-eastern France]. Bulletin du Musée d'histoire naturelle de Marseille (in French). 35: 153–208.
- Clauzade, G.; Roux, C. (1977). "Lichénologie: taxons nouveaux et intéressants pour le Midi de la France" [Lichenology: new and interesting taxa for the South of France] (PDF). Le Bulletin de la Société Linnéenne de Provence (in French). 30: 9–36.

== See also ==
- Category:Taxa named by Georges Clauzade
