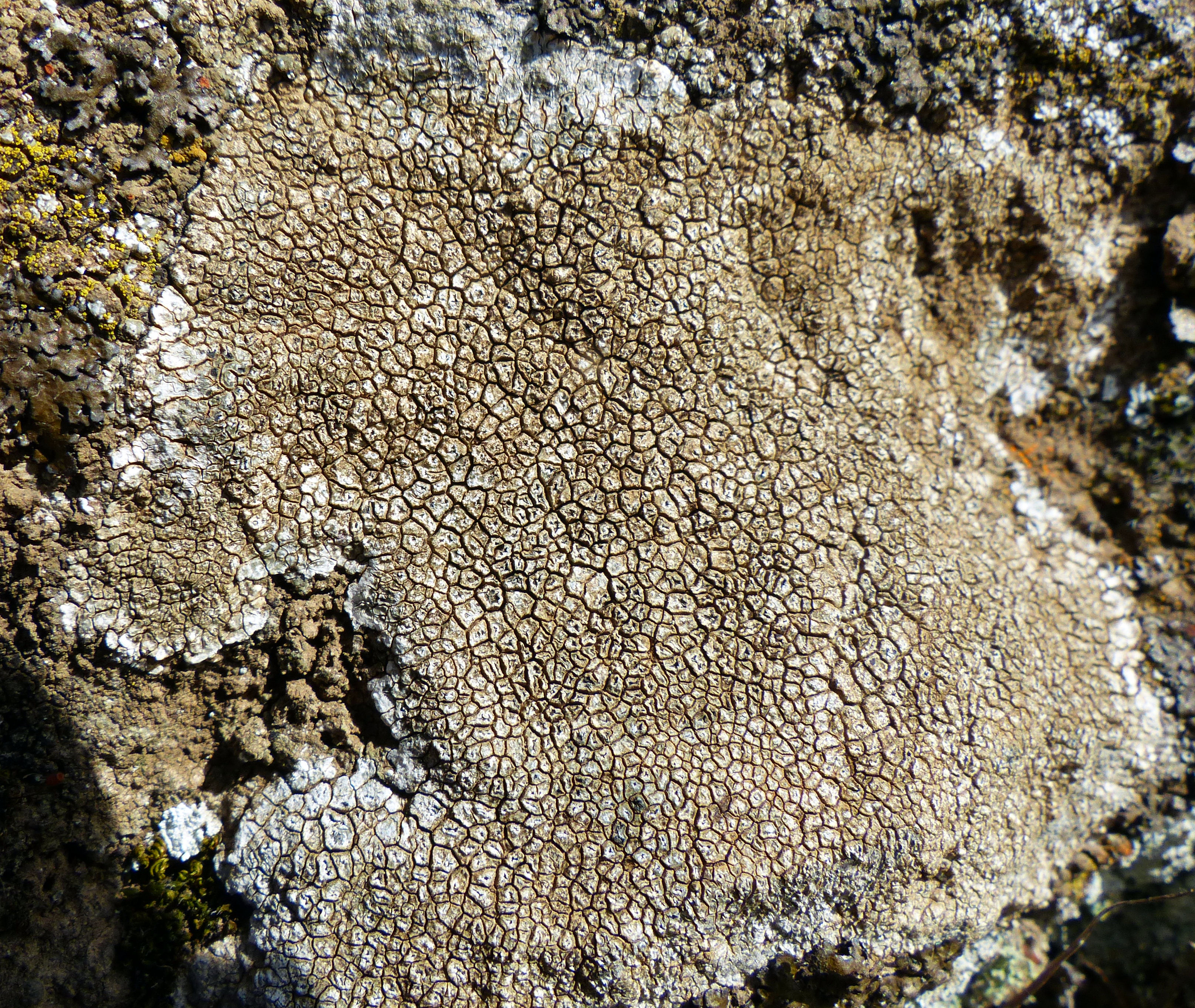
- Aspiciliella intermutans

Scientific classification
- Kingdom: Fungi
- Division: Ascomycota
- Class: Lecanoromycetes
- Order: Pertusariales
- Family: Megasporaceae
- Genus: Aspiciliella; M.Choisy (1932)

Type species
- Aspiciliella intermutans (Nyl.) M.Choisy (1932)

Species
- A. cupreoglauca A. intermutans A. pakistanica A. portosantana

= Aspiciliella =

Genus of lichens

Aspiciliella is a genus of lichen-forming fungi in the family Megasporaceae. It has four species. The genus is characterised by its crustose, rimose-areolate thallus that is partially continuous and has a K+ (red) reaction. The epihymenium is typically green to olive-green and turns light green when treated with N (N+ light green). Aspiciliella has eight-spored asci of the Aspicilia-type, containing ellipsoid, colourless, and simple ascospores.

== Taxonomy ==
The genus Aspiciliella was originally proposed by Maurice Choisy in 1932, with Aspiciliella intermutans assigned as the type species. However, it was not widely recognised as a distinct genus for many years. In 2017, based on comprehensive molecular phylogenetics studies, Aspiciliella was resurrected as a separate genus within the family Megasporaceae. Phylogenetic analyses using three genetic markers (ITS, nuLSU, and mtSSU) have confirmed Aspiciliella's position as a distinct clade within Megasporaceae. It forms a sister group to other established genera in the family. This molecular evidence strongly supports Aspiciliella as a genus separate from Aspicilia, with which it was previously grouped based on morphological similarities.

== Description ==
The genus Aspiciliella consists of crustose lichens, which form crust-like growths that adhere closely to the substrate. The thallus, or body of the lichen, is typically cracked and divided into small, irregular sections (rimose-areolate), and is partially continuous across the surface it grows on. The lichen's photosynthetic partner, or photobiont, is a type of chlorococcoid green alga.

The reproductive structures of Aspiciliella, the apothecia, range in colour from pale brown to dark grey or black. These apothecia have a true exciple, which is a distinct outer rim surrounding the spore-producing area. In some cases, the exciple may be further enclosed by an additional margin made from the thallus itself, though this is rare.

The upper layer of the apothecium, called the epithecium, can vary in colour from green to olive green or greenish-brown. When treated with certain chemical tests, the epithecium turns light green (N+). Beneath the epithecium, the hypothecium and subhymenium layers are colourless, but they react to iodine (I+) by turning blue to rusty red, as does the hymenium, the layer where the spores develop.

The asci, which are the structures that produce the spores, typically contain eight spores and are of the Aspicilia-type, meaning they share certain structural characteristics with those found in the genus Aspicilia. The ascospores themselves are ellipsoidal, colourless, and lack internal divisions (aseptate). The lichen also produces conidia, which are asexual spores that are straight and measure 7–11 μm in length.

Chemically, the thallus of Aspiciliella reacts positively to potassium hydroxide solution (K+ red), but does not react to chlorine (C−) or ultraviolet light (UV−). Thin-layer chromatography tests have identified norstictic acid as the primary chemical compound in the thallus, with some species also containing connorstictic and stictic acids.

Aspiciliella can be distinguished from its close relative Aspicilia by several key characteristics. The most notable differences are its smaller conidia, measuring 7–11 μm in length, compared to the larger conidia (11–40 μm) found in Aspicilia. Additionally, Aspiciliella consistently produces ellipsoid ascospores, while Aspicilia may have ellipsoid or occasionally globose ascospores. Another distinguishing feature is the consistent presence of norstictic acid in Aspiciliella, which is only occasionally found in some Aspicilia species.

== Species ==
- Aspiciliella cupreoglauca (B.de Lesd.) Zakeri, Divakar & Otte (2017)
- Aspiciliella intermutans (Nyl.) M.Choisy (1932)
- Aspiciliella pakistanica K.Habib, Firdous, Sohrabi & Khalid (2021)
- Aspiciliella portosantana Sipman & Zakeri (2017)
