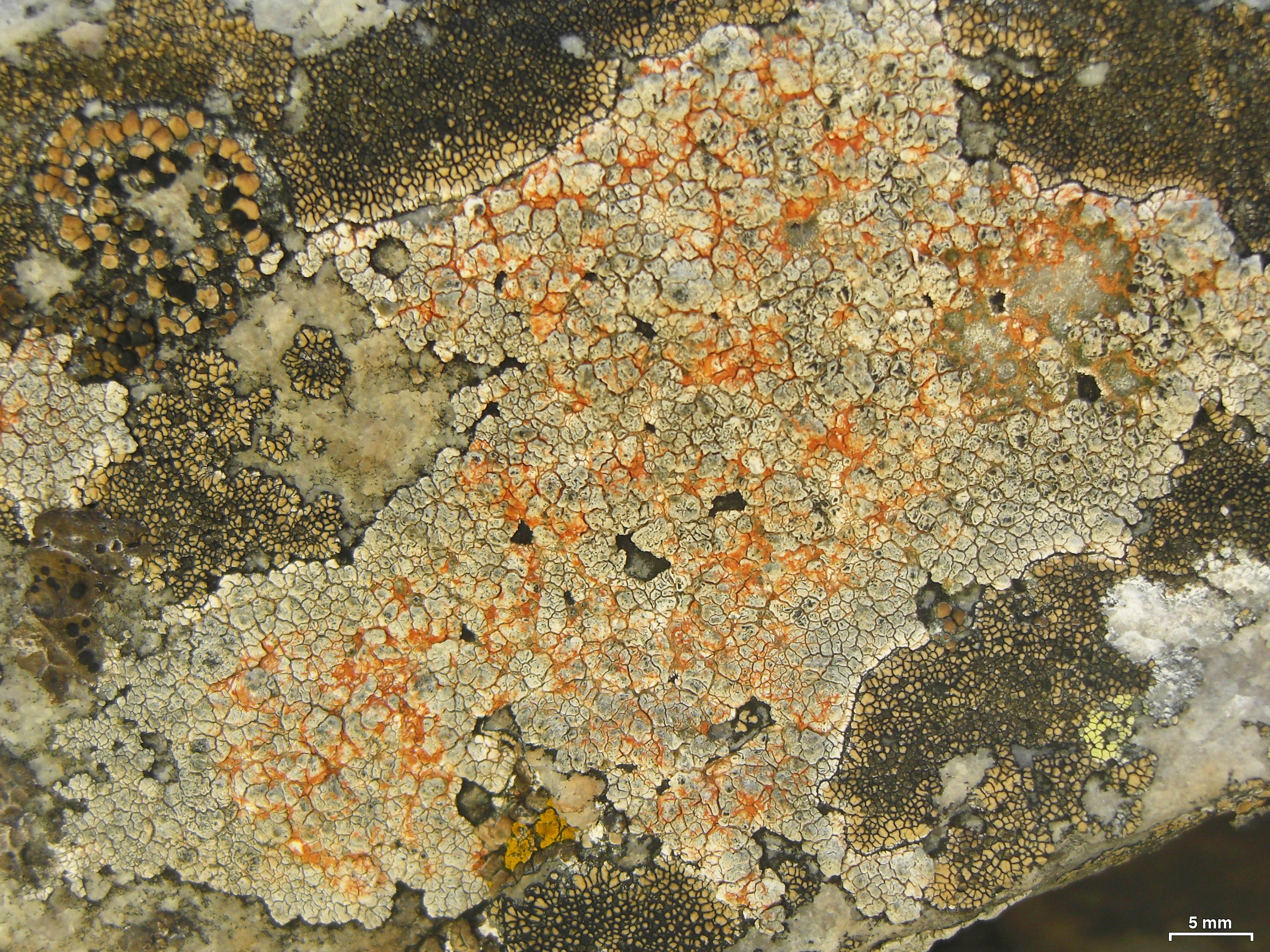
- Aspicilia cinerea

Scientific classification
- Kingdom: Fungi
- Division: Ascomycota
- Class: Lecanoromycetes
- Order: Pertusariales
- Family: Megasporaceae; Lumbsch (1994)

Type genus
- Megaspora (Clauzade & Cl.Roux) Hafellner & V.Wirth (1987)

= Megasporaceae =

Family of lichen-forming fungi

Megasporaceae are a family of fungi belonging to the order Pertusariales. The family comprises about 300 species of lichen-forming fungi distributed worldwide, predominantly growing on rocks but also on soil, moss, and occasionally tree bark. Members form crust-like growths (though some have more elaborate forms) that contain green algae within their tissues, and they reproduce through disc-shaped fruiting bodies (apothecia) typically sunken into the thallus surface. The family includes eleven recognised genera, with Aspicilia being by far the largest at around 200 species. Originally established in 1994 for the single genus Megaspora, the family was later expanded through DNA studies to include several genera previously classified elsewhere, particularly those formerly grouped with Aspicilia in a broad sense.

== Taxonomy ==
Megasporaceae was erected as a new family in 1994 by H. Thorsten Lumbsch and colleagues to accommodate the genus Megaspora. In their reinterpretation, Megaspora (previously treated in the Hymeneliaceae within Lecanorales) was transferred to the order Pertusariales because it was considered to share key characters with pertusarialean lichens, especially the Pertusariaceae. Lumbsch and co-authors nevertheless treated Megaspora as sufficiently distinct from Pertusariaceae to warrant its own family, emphasising differences such as weakly amyloid asci and the reported absence of a chambre oculaire (an internal cavity). As originally circumscribed, Megasporaceae was monotypic and explicitly typified by Megaspora.

DNA-based phylogenetic studies later showed that some traditional family concepts in Pertusariales did not correspond to single evolutionary lineages (meaning they were not monophyletic), with Pertusariaceae in particular resolving as polyphyletic in broad sampling. Using nuclear LSU and mitochondrial SSU rDNA, Schmitt and co-authors recovered Megaspora in a clade with Aspicilia and Lobothallia rather than with Pertusaria in the narrow sense (sensu stricto). They therefore expanded Megasporaceae to include Aspicilia and Lobothallia and restricted Pertusariaceae to a narrower concept centred on Pertusaria sensu stricto (together with Loxosporopsis). In doing so, they treated the previously suggested but never validly published family name Aspiciliaceae as a synonym of Megasporaceae.

The systematic position of Aspicilia had long been debated, and for much of the 20th century it was commonly treated as part of the genus Lecanora rather than as a distinct pertusarialean lineage. A focused two-locus phylogeny (nrLSU and mtSSU) with denser sampling across the group recovered Megasporaceae as a well-supported monophyletic family and provided a framework for revising generic limits within it. Anders Nordin and co-authors showed that Aspicilia in the broad sense (sensu lato) is heterogeneous in these analyses and proposed recognising five genera within Megasporaceae, retaining Aspicilia for the clade containing the type species A. cinerea. In that classification, Lobothallia was resolved as sister to the rest of Megasporaceae, while the monotypic Megaspora was recovered close to Circinaria. They resurrected the generic names Circinaria and Sagedia for clades segregated from Aspicilia and made new combinations to match those circumscriptions. Their analyses also placed Aspilidea outside Megasporaceae (though close to it), indicating uncertainty at the family boundary with neighbouring pertusarialean lineages in some datasets.

Subsequent multilocus work identified an additional, strongly supported lineage within Megasporaceae that did not fit the genera recognised by Nordin and co-authors, leading to the resurrection of the genus Aspiciliella for a clade containing species previously placed in Aspicilia. In a phylogeny based on ITS, nuLSU and mtSSU, Aspiciliella was recovered as a well-supported sister group to the remaining Megasporaceae genera, and new combinations were proposed to reflect this delimitation.

A later five-locus phylogeny across Megasporaceae provided stronger support for relationships among most recognised genera and recovered Aspilidea as an early-diverging lineage within the family. In the same analysis, the species then known as Aspicilia brucei formed a distinct clade between Aspilidea and the remainder of Megasporaceae and was placed in the newly described genus Antidea. Wheeler and co-authors also noted that although many intergeneric relationships were well supported, some placements (including the position of Megaspora) remained weakly supported.

== Description ==
Members of the Megasporaceae are lichen-forming ascomycete fungi that contain a green algal photobiont within the thallus. The thallus is most often crustose (crust-like and closely appressed), but within the family there are also taxa with more elaborate thallus forms, including foliose and subfruticose morphologies that were historically treated within Aspicilia in a broad sense. In the type genus Megaspora, the thallus is described as crustose and may have an epinecral (dead) surface layer rather than a sharply delimited cortex.

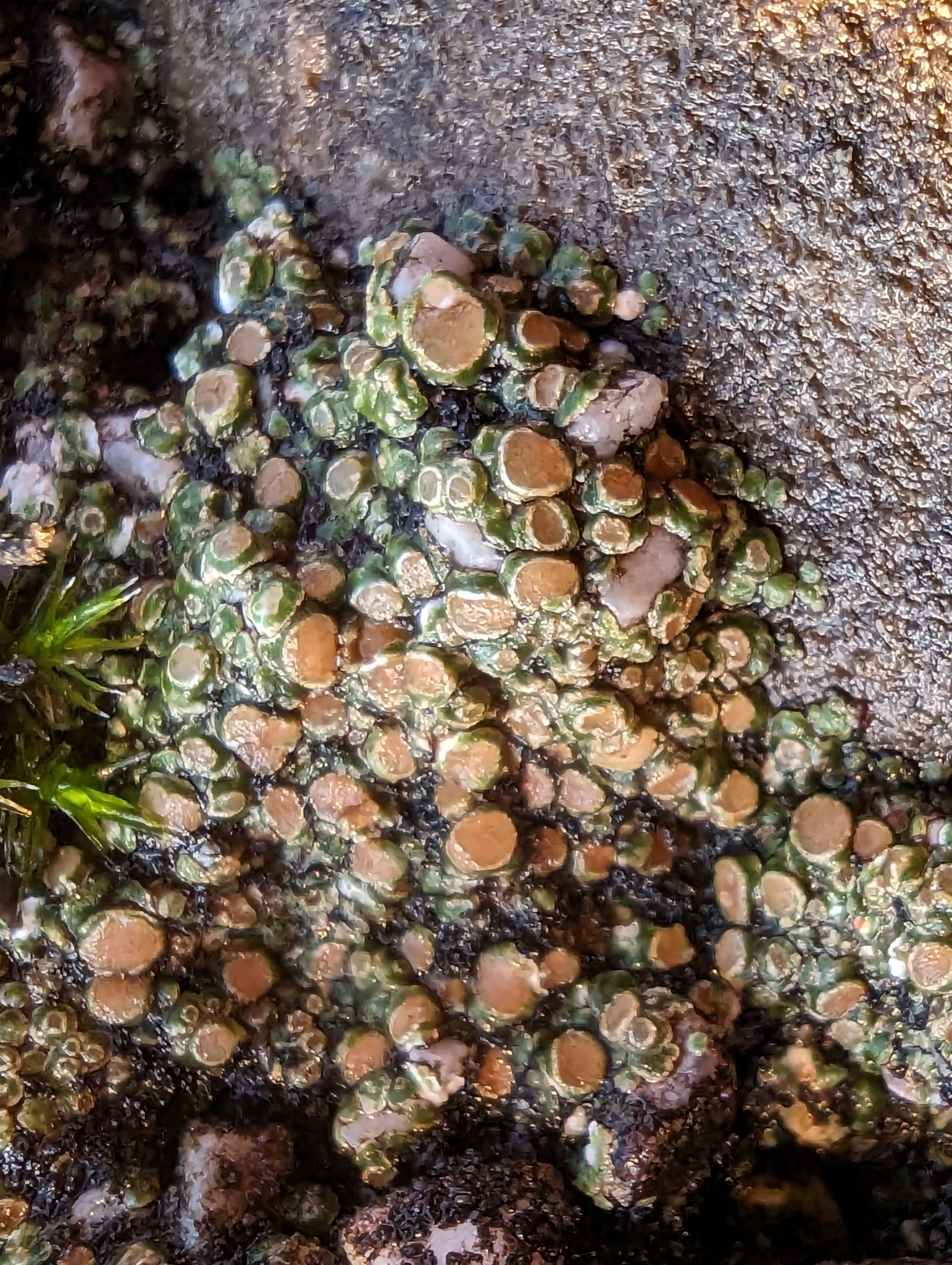
The "chiseled sunken disk lichen" (Circinaria contorta)

Sexual reproduction is by apothecia that are typically immersed to sunken in the thallus (sometimes becoming sessile), and in many members of the family the proper exciple is reduced compared with related families in the Pertusariales. Where described in detail for the type genus, apothecia are zeorine and can be immersed in wart-like swellings (verrucae), with a hyaline, cup-like proper exciple extending beneath the hymenium. The hymenium commonly has an olivaceous to greenish epihymenium, which helps explain why apothecial discs in Megasporaceae are often dark grey to black rather than pale-coloured.

Microscopically, the hymenium contains paraphyses/paraphysoids that in Megasporaceae are often thick and bead-like (moniliform to submoniliform) and may be unbranched to only weakly branched, although more richly branched and anastomosing paraphysoids have been reported in the type genus. Asci are typically 6–8-spored, and the iodine reactions reported for the family are consistent with relatively weakly amyloid structures (for example, a thin outer coat) rather than the strongly amyloid, multilayered ascus walls seen in some neighbouring pertusarialean families. The hymenium is usually described as hemiamyloid (showing an orange-brown iodine reaction), though at least some lineages assigned to Megasporaceae can differ in this character.

Ascospores are colourless (hyaline), generally ellipsoid and simple (non-septate), with size and wall thickness varying across the family. For many Megasporaceae, ascospores are reported as comparatively small and thin-walled (often around 15–25 μm long), whereas in Megaspora they can be much larger and thick-walled, reaching about 50–60 μm in length.

Asexual reproduction involves immersed pycnidia producing conidia, and conidial shape and size vary from bacilliform to filiform, with reported lengths spanning roughly 5–40 μm across the family and much smaller conidia (roughly 7–11 μm) documented in Aspiciliella. Secondary chemistry is variable: some taxa have no detectable lichen substances, while others produce compounds such as aspicilin and several depsidones in the stictic/norstictic acid group (including norstictic and stictic acids).

== Habitat, distribution, and ecology ==
Megasporaceae is placed in the order Pertusariales, whose members are described as occurring worldwide and across all major ecosystems. Within Pertusariales, Megasporaceae is predominantly saxicolous (rock-dwelling), with many species occurring directly on exposed rock surfaces. In the same comparison, Wheeler and co-authors noted that (unlike Ochrolechiaceae, which also includes bark-, wood-, and soil-inhabiting taxa) Megasporaceae is largely restricted to rock substrates, and that Antidea and Aspilidea are only saxicolous.

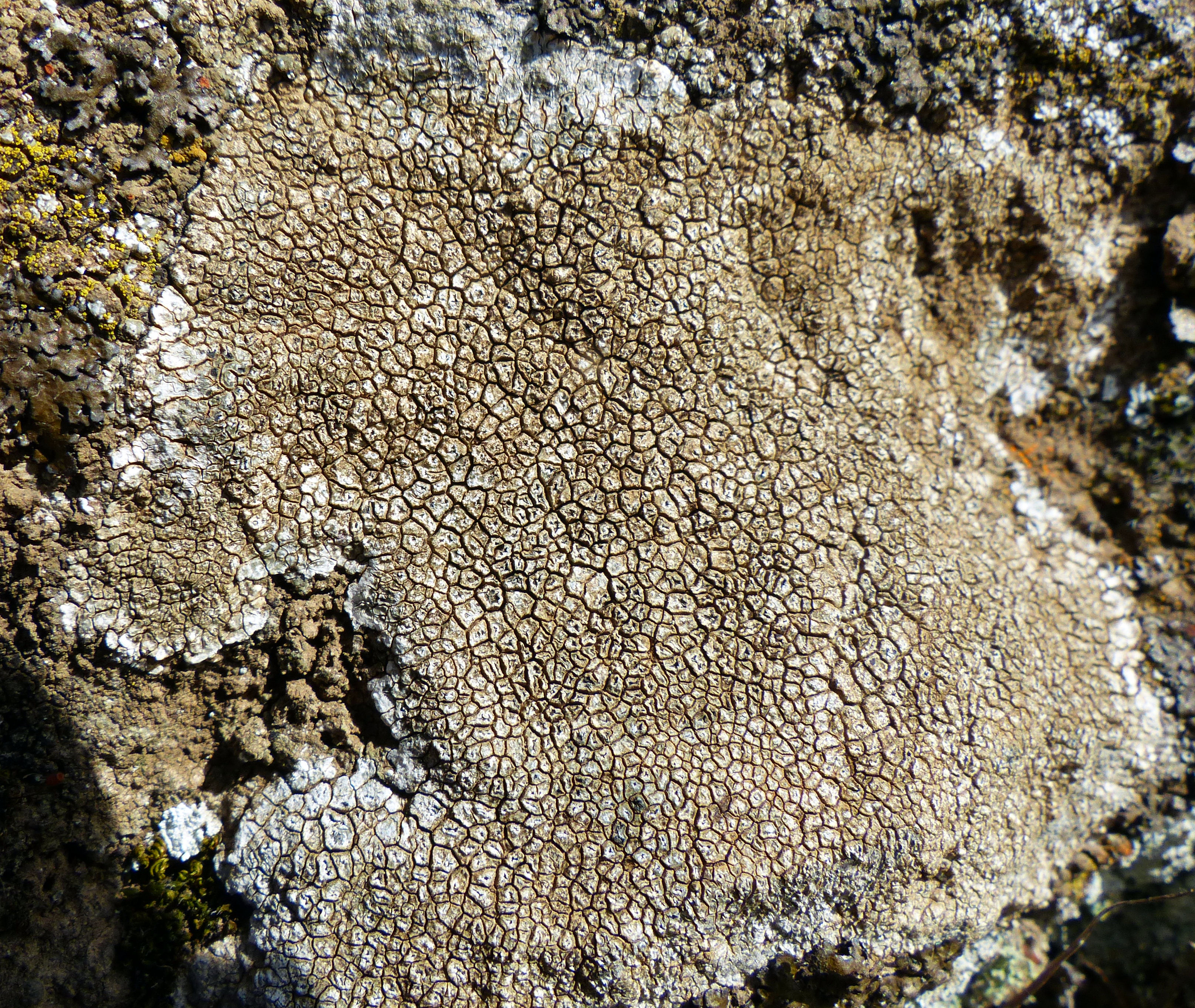
Aspiciliella intermutans

Substrate preferences nevertheless vary across the family, and non-saxicolous habits are documented in some lineages treated within Megasporaceae. The type genus Megaspora includes species reported as growing mainly over mosses and on soil, and only rarely on tree bark, with a stated preference for calcareous soil. In the large genus Aspicilia, species are predominantly saxicolous, but terricolous (soil-inhabiting) and wood-inhabiting species are also known. Material discussed in recent revisions shows Megasporaceae occurring on a wide range of rock types, including granite and related granitoids, quartzite, argillite, schist and phyllite. Some species are also documented from human-made substrates that resemble natural rock, such as stone walls and other masonry.

Megasporaceae occupies a variety of microhabitats on rock, from open, exposed outcrops and bare ridges to more sheltered sites such as boulders beside or within small streams. For example, Aspiciliella portosantana was reported from volcanic rock outcrops in exposed settings and from stone walls along abandoned fields. Other taxa treated in Megasporaceae have been collected from shaded streamside boulders, as well as from dry montane habitats on talus and boulder fields. Across the material summarised in these studies, recorded elevations range from lowland sites around 100 m to high montane localities above 2000 m.

Megasporaceae species have been documented across a broad climatic span, including arctic-to-temperate records for the type genus Megaspora. At the same time, some lineages are well represented in warmer regions, with Aspiciliella reported as widespread in the Mediterranean and extending at least to Iran and Macaronesia. North American members include taxa described as northern in distribution, with records spanning from Alaska to Newfoundland for at least one species treated in a recent revision. A regional survey in southern Xinjiang, China, recorded 34 species of Megasporaceae in the genera Aspicilia, Circinaria, and Lobothallia, all of them crustose and strictly saxicolous. In that arid mountain region, they were found from 1,600 to 5,100 m elevation, with local species richness highest at mid-elevations: 30 species were recorded between 2,601 and 3,100 m, compared with only four below 2,150 m and seven above 4,600 m. This suggests a broadly unimodal elevational pattern in the family's local diversity. Overall, Megasporaceae is described as worldwide in distribution and estimated to comprise about 300 species.

== Genera ==
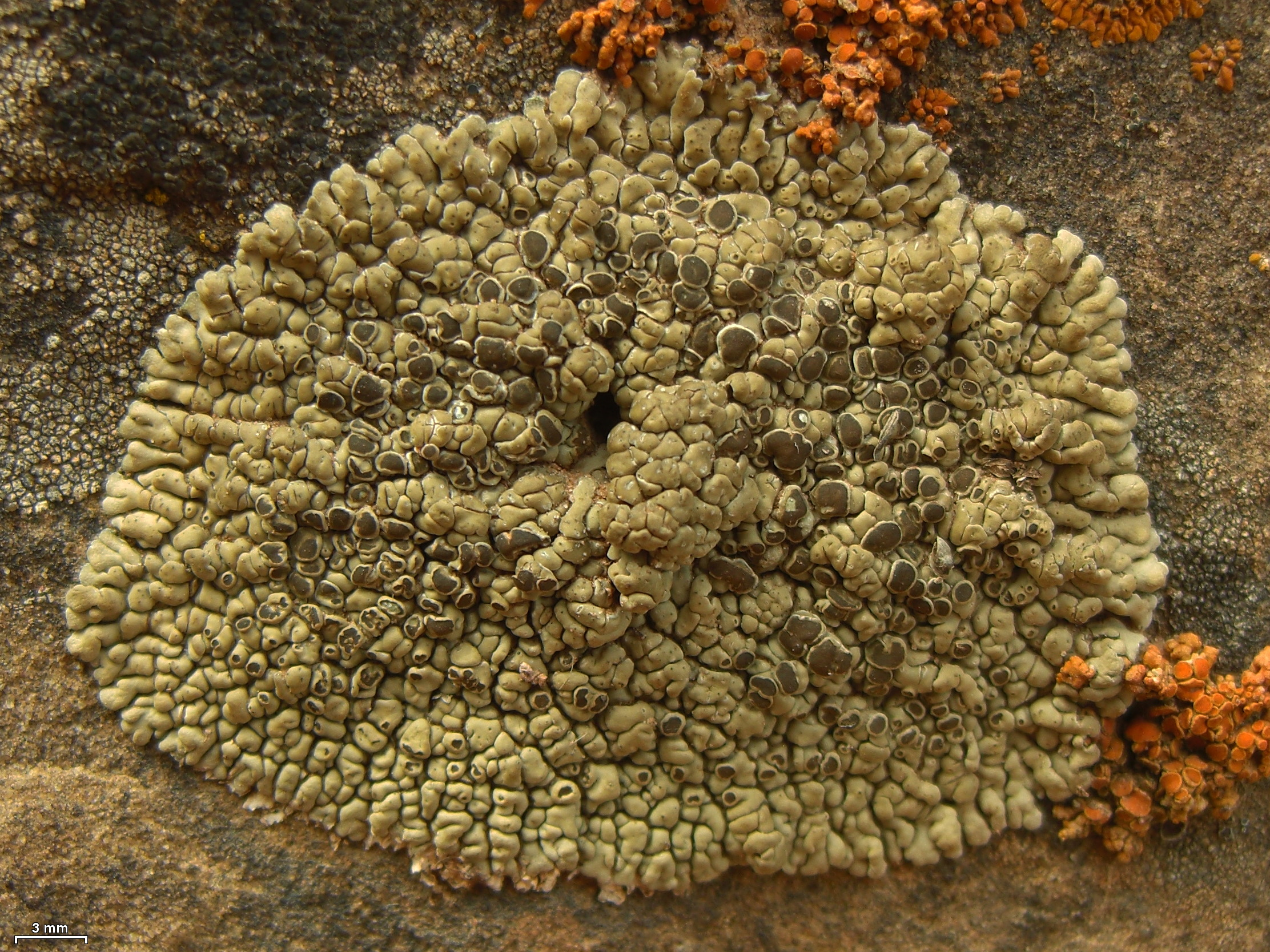
Lobothallia praeradiosa

Genera of this family include:

- Antidea T.B.Wheeler (2024) – 1 sp.
- Atrostelia Paukov, Davydov & Yakovch. (2024) – 1 sp.
- Aspicilia A.Massal. (1852) – ca. 200 spp.
- Aspiciliella M.Choisy (1932) – 4 spp.
- Aspilidea Hafellner (2001)- 1 sp.
- Circinaria Link (1809) – 40 spp.
- Lobothallia (Clauzade & Cl.Roux) Hafellner (1991) – 17 spp.
- Megaspora (Clauzade & Cl.Roux) Hafellner & V.Wirth (1987) – 4 spp.
- Oxneriaria S.Y.Kondr. & Lőkös (2017) – 9 spp.
- Sagedia Ach. (1809) – 15 spp.
- Teuvoa Sohrabi & S.D.Leav (2013) – 5 spp.

In Wheeler et al. (2024), Aspilidea is treated as part of Megasporaceae based on a five-locus phylogeny that recovers it (together with Antidea) in a basal position within the family, near the sister family Ochrolechiaceae. The authors describe its placement as somewhat ambiguous because it shows a mix of characters otherwise associated with both families, and they note that earlier treatments often left Aspilidea as incertae sedis within Ostropomycetidae or placed it outside Megasporaceae. Accordingly, they include Aspilidea in Megasporaceae while acknowledging that its familial position may be reassessed as sampling and family limits in Pertusariales are refined. The dominance of Aspicilia in the family is also reflected in regional surveys: in southern Xinjiang, a 2026 study recorded 22 species of Aspicilia, compared with eight of Circinaria and four of Lobothallia.
