= Claude Roux =

French lichenologist and esperantist

- Born: October 19, 1945 (age 80); Orange, Vacleuse
- Education: University of Aix-Marseille
- Known for: Mediterranean lichenology; Esperanto
- Scientific career
- Workplaces: CNRS
- Doctoral advisors: Ferdinand Joseph Georges Alexandre Clauzade
- Author abbrev. (botany): Cl.Roux

Claude Roux is a French lichenologist, mycologist and Esperantist. He has co-authored books about the identification of lichens written in Esperanto.

== Career ==
From 1969 to 1975, Roux taught biology and geology in a secondary school. From 1975 he worked at the Botany Laboratory of the CNRS Mediterranean Institute of Ecology and Paleoecology in Marseille, studying systematics, morphology and reproduction of lichens. He retired in 2005 but continues scientific research as an honorary CNRS researcher.

He has been president of the French Institute of Esperanto. He is a member of the International Academy of Sciences San Marino.

== Awards and honours ==
The lichen genus Claurouxia is named after him as well as several species. He is the honorary president of the French Lichenology Association (Association Française de Lichénologie)

== Publications ==
Roux is the author or co-author of many books and scientific papers. These include:

- Paukov, A.G., Davydov, E.A., Nordin, A., Roux, C., Şenkardeşler, A., Sohrabi, M., Vondrák, J., Frolov, I.V., Teptina, A.Y. & Shiryaeva, A.S. 2019. Three new species, new combinations and a key to known species of Lobothallia (Megasporaceae). The Lichenologist 51(4): 301–322.
- Roux, C. 2012. Liste des lichens et champignons lichénicoles de France. Bulletin de la Société Linnéenne de Provence NS 16: 1–220.
- Gueidan, C., Savić, S., Thüs, H., Roux, C., Keller, C., Tibell, L., Prieto, M., Heiðmarsson, S., Breuss, O., Orange, A., Fröberg, L., Wynns, A.A., Navarro-Rosinés, P., Krzewicka, B., Pykälä, J., Grube, M. & Lutzoni, F. 2009. Generic classification of the Verrucariaceae (Ascomycota) based on molecular and morphological evidence: recent progress and remaining challenges. Taxon: The Journal of the International Association for Plant Taxonomy 58(1): 184–208.
- Hibbett, D.S., Binder, M., Bischoff, J.F., Blackwell, M., Cannon, P.F., Eriksson, O.E., Huhndorf, S.M., James, T., Kirk, P.M., Lücking, R., Lumbsch, H.T., Lutzoni, F., Matheny, P.B., McLaughlin, D.J., Powell, M.J., Redhead, S.A., Schoch, C.L., Spatafora, J.W., Stalpers, J.A., Vilgalys, R.J., Aime, M.C., Aptroot, A., Bauer, R., Begerow, D., Benny, G.L., Castlebury, L.A., Crous, P.W., Dai, Y.C., Gams, K.W., Geiser, D.M., Griffith, G.W., Gueidan, C., Hawksworth, D.L., Hestmark, G., Hosaka, K., Humber, R.A., Hyde, K.D., Ironside, J.E., Kõljalg, U., Kurtzman, C.P., Larsson, K.H., Lichtwardt, R.W., Longcore, J.E., Miądlikowska, J., Miller, A.N., Moncalvo, J.M., Mozley-Standridge, S., Oberwinkler, F., Parmasto, E., Reeb, V., Rogers, J.D., Roux, C., Ryvarden, L., Sampaio, J.P., Schüßler, A., Sugiyama, J., Thorn, R.G., Tibell, L., Untereiner, W.A., Walker, C., Wang, Z., Weir, A., Weiss, M., White, M.M., Winka, K., Yao, Y.J. & Zhang, N. 2007. A higher-level phylogenetic classification of the Fungi. Mycological Research 111(5): 509–547.
- Clauzade, G. & Roux, C. 1984. Les genres Aspicilia Massal. et Bellemerea Hafellner et Roux. Bulletin de la Société Botanique du Centre-Ouest, N.S., 15: 127–141

He has also co-authored several books written in Esperanto, including:

- Georges Clauzade and Claude Roux (1985) Likenoj de okcidenta Eǔropo: ilustrita determinlibro (Lichens of Western Europe: an illustrated book of determination)
- Georges Clauzade, Claude Roux and Paul Diederich (1989) Nelikeniĝintaj fungoj likenloĝaj: ilustrita determinlibro (Non-lichenized lichenicultural mushrooms)

== See also ==
- Category:Taxa named by Claude Roux
