= Lichenostigma radicans =

Scientific classification
- Kingdom: Fungi
- Division: Ascomycota
- Class: Arthoniomycetes
- Order: Lichenostigmatales
- Family: Phaeococcomycetaceae
- Genus: Lichenostigma
- Species: L. radicans

Binomial name
- Lichenostigma radicans Calat. & Barreno (2003)
- Holotype: Teruel, Spain

Species of lichen

Lichenostigma radicans is a species of lichenicolous (lichen-dwelling) fungus in the family Phaeococcomycetaceae. It grows specifically on certain lichens that live unattached on soil, known as vagrant lichens, primarily in mountainous, limestone-rich areas. First described in 2003 from a collection in eastern Spain, this fungus forms tiny, dark fruiting structures partly embedded in its host lichen. A distinctive feature is its root-like threads that penetrate deep into the host without causing significant harm. Lichenostigma radicans is closely related to other fungi in its genus but can be identified by these root-like structures and microscopic differences in its spores.

== Taxonomy ==
The fungus was described as a new species in 2003 by the Spanish lichenologists Vicent Calatayud and Eva Barreno. The holotype (the original specimen used to describe the species) was collected on 5 August 1990, by Calatayud in Spain (Aragon, Province of Teruel, between Frías de Albarracín and the source of the Tagus river, at about 1,600 metres elevation). The specimen was growing on the crustose lichen Aspicilia hispida, which was itself growing on soil. The specific epithet radicans (Latin for "rooting") refers to one of the most distinctive characteristics of this species: the brown hyphae that emerge from the lower part of the ascomata (fruiting bodies) and penetrate into the host lichen, resembling roots. This root-like growth pattern distinguishes it from other species in the genus.

Lichenostigma radicans fits within the subgenus Lichenostigma based on its cushion-like ascomata (fungal fruiting bodies), but shows some intermediate characteristics with the subgenus Lichenogramma. The genus Lichenostigma is divided into two subgenera. Subgenus Lichenostigma is characterized by cushion-like ascomata that are not connected to surface-growing hyphal strands. Subgenus Lichenogramma is characterized by globose (spherical) or elongated ascomata connected to surface-growing, black, vegetative strands. L. radicans shows features of both subgenera. While it has cushion-like ascomata typical of subgenus Lichenostigma, it also possesses brown vegetative hyphae similar to the hyphal strands of species in subgenus Lichenogramma. However, unlike typical Lichenogramma species, these hyphae grow immersed within the host lichen rather than on its surface.

== Description ==
Lichenostigma radicans is a lichenicolous fungus that grows specifically on vagrant (free-living) Aspicilia lichen species. It appears as small black, cushion-like structures (ascomata) measuring 45–70 μm tall and 90–170 μm wide, which are partially immersed in the host lichen's surface. The most distinctive feature of this species is its brown, root-like vegetative hyphae that emerge from the base of the ascomata and penetrate downward into the host lichen tissue, reaching up to 180 μm in length.

The fungus produces brown, single-septate (divided by one wall) ascospores measuring 9–14 by 5–7.5 μm with a finely roughened surface. Unlike related species, L. radicans has pale brown internal cells within its fruiting bodies, and its vegetative hyphae are distinctly visible and branched within the host tissue. The fungus does not appear to cause significant damage to its host lichens, which typically grow on soil in calcareous mountain areas with continental climate conditions.

=== Similar species ===
Lichenostigma anatolicum is another species in the same genus that shares similarities with L. radicans. This species lacks superficial hyphae, similar to L. radicans, but can be distinguished by several key characteristics. L. anatolicum differs from L. radicans by having ascomatal tissues that turn bluish when exposed to iodine (I+), smaller ascomata (70–110 μm wide and 35–50 μm tall compared to 90–170 μm wide and 45–70 μm tall in L. radicans), and slightly shorter ascospores. Unlike L. radicans which grows on vagrant Aspicilia species on soil, L. anatolicum occurs on different lichen hosts growing on different substrates. While L. radicans has ascomata that are semi-immersed in the host thallus, L. anatolicum typically has more superficial fruiting bodies.

Lichenostigma supertegentis, a species described from Scandinavia, resembles L. radicans but can be distinguished by several characteristics. Unlike L. radicans, L. supertegentis does not have hyphae penetrating into the host thallus, has larger ascospores measuring 16.0–21.5 by 8.0–11.0 μm, and occasionally forms gall-like structures on the host tissue. The ascomatal cavities in L. supertegentis have a positive reaction with iodine (K/I+), a feature absent in L. radicans.
