= Lichenostigma svandae =

Scientific classification
- Kingdom: Fungi
- Division: Ascomycota
- Class: Arthoniomycetes
- Order: Lichenostigmatales
- Family: Phaeococcomycetaceae
- Genus: Lichenostigma
- Species: L. svandae

Binomial name
- Lichenostigma svandae Vondrák & Šoun (2007)
- Holotype: Feodosia, Crimea

Species of lichen

Lichenostigma svandae is a species of lichenicolous (lichen-dwelling) fungus in the family Phaeococcomycetaceae. This microscopic parasitic fungus appears as soot-grey flecks on its host lichen species Acarospora cervina, forming dark, net-like strands of fungal threads that anchor themselves to the lichen surface with short root-like offshoots. Described as new to science in 2007 from specimens collected in Crimea, it is known from sun-exposed limestone outcrops in Europe and southwestern Asia.

== Taxonomy ==
The fungus was described as a new species in 2007 by Jan Vondrák and Jaroslav Šoun. The authors collected the type specimen from a limestone hill in the protected area Karadagskyj Zapovednik (Feodosia, Crimea) at an elevation of about 300 m (980 ft); it was growing on the thalli and apothecia (fruiting bodies) crustose lichen species Acarospora cervina, which was itself growing on sun-exposed limestone rock. The species epithet honours bus driver Jaroslav Švanda, who drove the bus to the excursion where the type was collected.

== Description ==
Lichenostigma svandae is a microscopic, black fungus that parasitises the rock-dwelling lichen Acarospora cervina. To the naked eye the infection looks like soot-grey flecks, but under a hand lens it resolves into dark, net-like strands of fungal threads (hyphae) lying on the lichen surface. Each strand is about 10–25 micrometres (μm) thick yet can extend to roughly 0.5 mm; it is built from tightly packed thin-walled cells whose outer faces are coated with dark pigment. Short, root-like offshoots grow downwards from the strand and penetrate the host cortex, anchoring the parasite but causing little visible damage.

Minute fruit-bodies (ascomata) develop on these strands one or two at a time. They are superficial, sack-shaped structures that never sink into the host tissue and measure roughly 70–125 μm long by 30–55 μm wide, giving an elongate outline with a length-to-breadth ratio of about 2:1. The wall of each ascoma consists of the same pigmented tissue as the vegetative strands and encloses one to three club-shaped asci. Every ascus contains six to eight ascospores. These spores begin colourless, turn greyish and finally pale brown with age, and are broadly ellipsoid (11–15 μm × 6–10 μm). They usually have a single internal cross-wall (septum) and only rarely a second; the septum produces only a faint waist, and the spore surface bears very fine granules. The ascus apex shows no iodine reaction, and no asexual reproductive structures have been observed.

The species is distinguished from its close relatives by its comparatively short, only sparingly branched vegetative strands (never exceeding about 500 μm) that carry at most two ascomata, and by the presence of spores with one or occasionally two septa—in contrast to the consistently single-septate spores of L. elongatum.

== Habitat and distribution ==
Lichenostigma svandae is known from sun-exposed limestone outcrops in Europe and southwestern Asia, where it grows exclusively on A. cervina. The species was originally described from the Crimean Peninsula and has also been recorded from the Czech Republic.
