= Aspicilia humida =

Scientific classification
- Kingdom: Fungi
- Division: Ascomycota
- Class: Lecanoromycetes
- Order: Pertusariales
- Family: Megasporaceae
- Genus: Aspicilia
- Species: A. humida

Binomial name
- Aspicilia humida B.G.Lee (2022)

Species of lichen

Aspicilia humida is a species of saxicolous (rock-dwelling) and crustose lichen in the family Megasporaceae. As a member of the Aspicilia cinerea species group, it is most closely related to that lichen as well as A. dudinensis, A. laevata, and A. indissimilis. Found in South Korea, it was formally described as a new species in 2022 by Beeyoung Gun Lee. The type specimen was collected in a forest wetland in Hoenggye-ri (Daegwallyeong-myeon, Gangwon Province) at an altitude of 1,047 m (3,435 ft); here it was found growing on siliceous rock. The lichen is only known to occur at the type locality. The specific epithet humida refers to the lichen's habitat, humid wetlands. Similar species include A. aquatica, A. vulcanica and A. pseudovulcanica.
