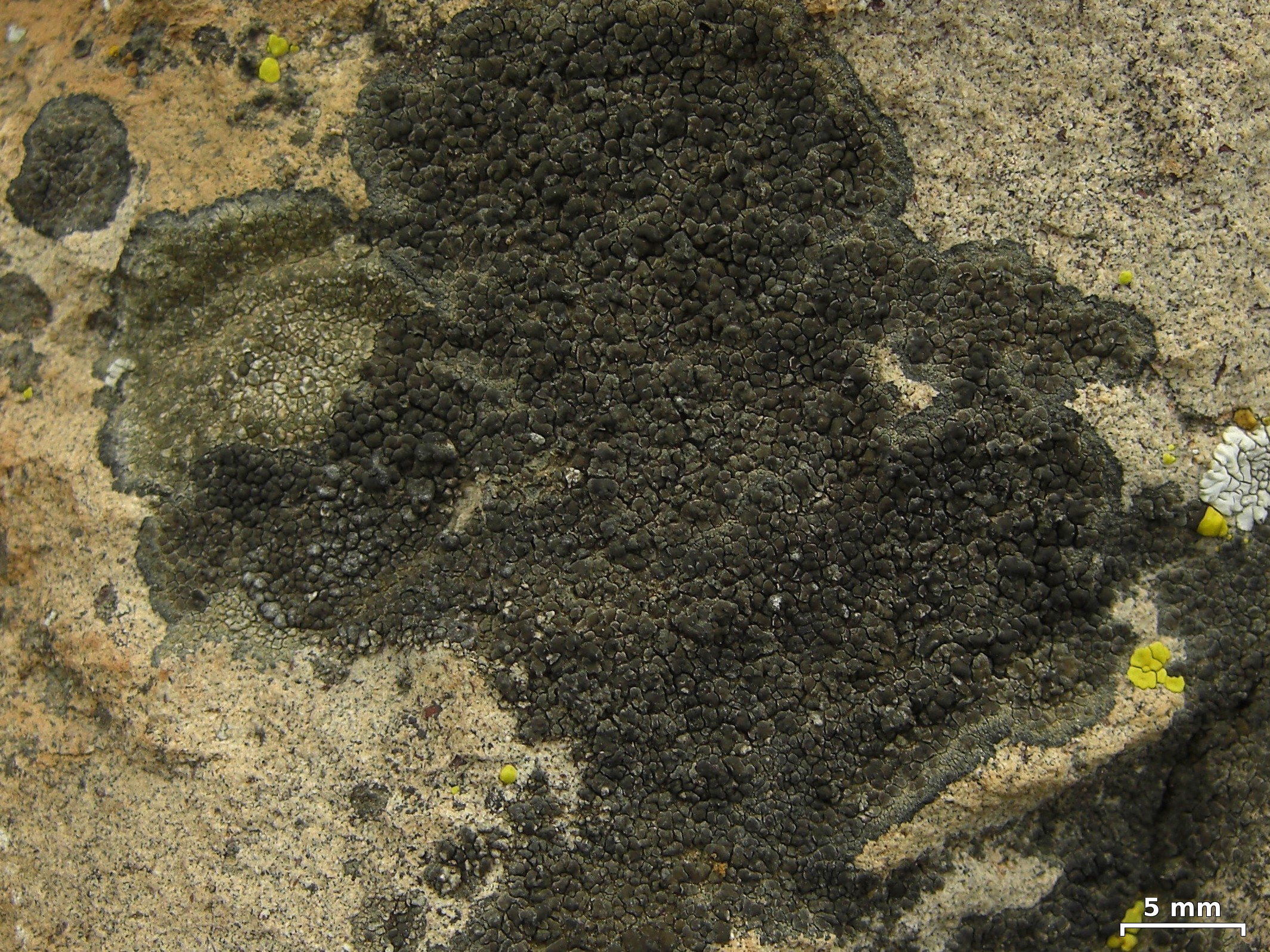

Scientific classification
- Kingdom: Fungi
- Division: Ascomycota
- Class: Lecanoromycetes
- Order: Caliciales
- Family: Caliciaceae
- Genus: Buellia
- Species: B. badia

Binomial name
- Buellia badia (Fr.) A.Massal. (1853)

Synonyms
- Lecidea badia Fr. (1825)

= Buellia badia =

Species of lichen

Buellia badia, the parasitic button lichen, is a dark chocolate-brown crustose areolate lichen of Europe, northern Africa, and North America that starts as a parasite growing on other lichens, such as Aspicilia phaea, gradually then becoming independent growing on rock (sometimes also on hardwood. Areoles may be contiguous or dispersed. Lecideine apothecia are 0.3 to 0.9 mm in diameter with black discs, that are initially flat, then become strongly convex as they age. Lichen spot tests are all negative. There are no known secondary metabolites as of (2001). It is similar in appearance and other ways to the chocolate brown Dimelaena californica, which also starts off as a parasite on other lichens, and has spores of similar shape, size, and internal construction. D. californica has not been found on wood, is more preferential as to the lichens it starts growing on (usually Dimeleana radiate), and commonly has norstictic acid as a secondary metabolite. Some think they should be included in a new, third genus.

== See also ==
- List of Buellia species
