= Amanita rimosa =

Scientific classification
- Domain: Eukaryota
- Kingdom: Fungi
- Division: Basidiomycota
- Class: Agaricomycetes
- Order: Agaricales
- Family: Amanitaceae
- Genus: Amanita
- Species: A. rimosa

Binomial name
- Amanita rimosa P. Zhang & Zhu L. Yang, 2010

Species of fungus

Amanita rimosa is a species of agaric fungus in the family Amanitaceae native to Hunan, first described by P. Zhang & Zhu L. Yang in 2010. Like other Phalloideae amanitas, it is lethally toxic. A distinctive feature of A. rimosa is its rimose pileus, caused by slightly gelatinized upper layer of the pileipellis, which is a rare structure among other Amanita species.

Ingestion can result in fatal liver damage due to amatoxins.
