= Lichenostigma rupicolae =

Scientific classification
- Domain: Eukaryota
- Kingdom: Fungi
- Division: Ascomycota
- Class: Arthoniomycetes
- Order: Lichenostigmatales
- Family: Phaeococcomycetaceae
- Genus: Lichenostigma
- Species: L. rupicolae

Binomial name
- Lichenostigma rupicolae Fern.-Brime & Nav.-Ros. (2010)

Species of fungus

Lichenostigma rupicolae is a species of lichenicolous (lichen-dwelling) fungus in the family Phaeococcomycetaceae. It was described in 2010 from specimens of Pertusaria rupicola, its host species. This parasitic fungus appears as soot-black patches on its host lichen, consisting of microscopic cord-like structures that radiate outward from a centre and eventually form small black cushions containing spores. Found in Mediterranean Europe and Turkey, it appears to be strictly host-specific to the crustose lichen P. rupicola and causes no obvious damage beyond creating the characteristic blackened patches on the lichen's surface.

== Taxonomy ==
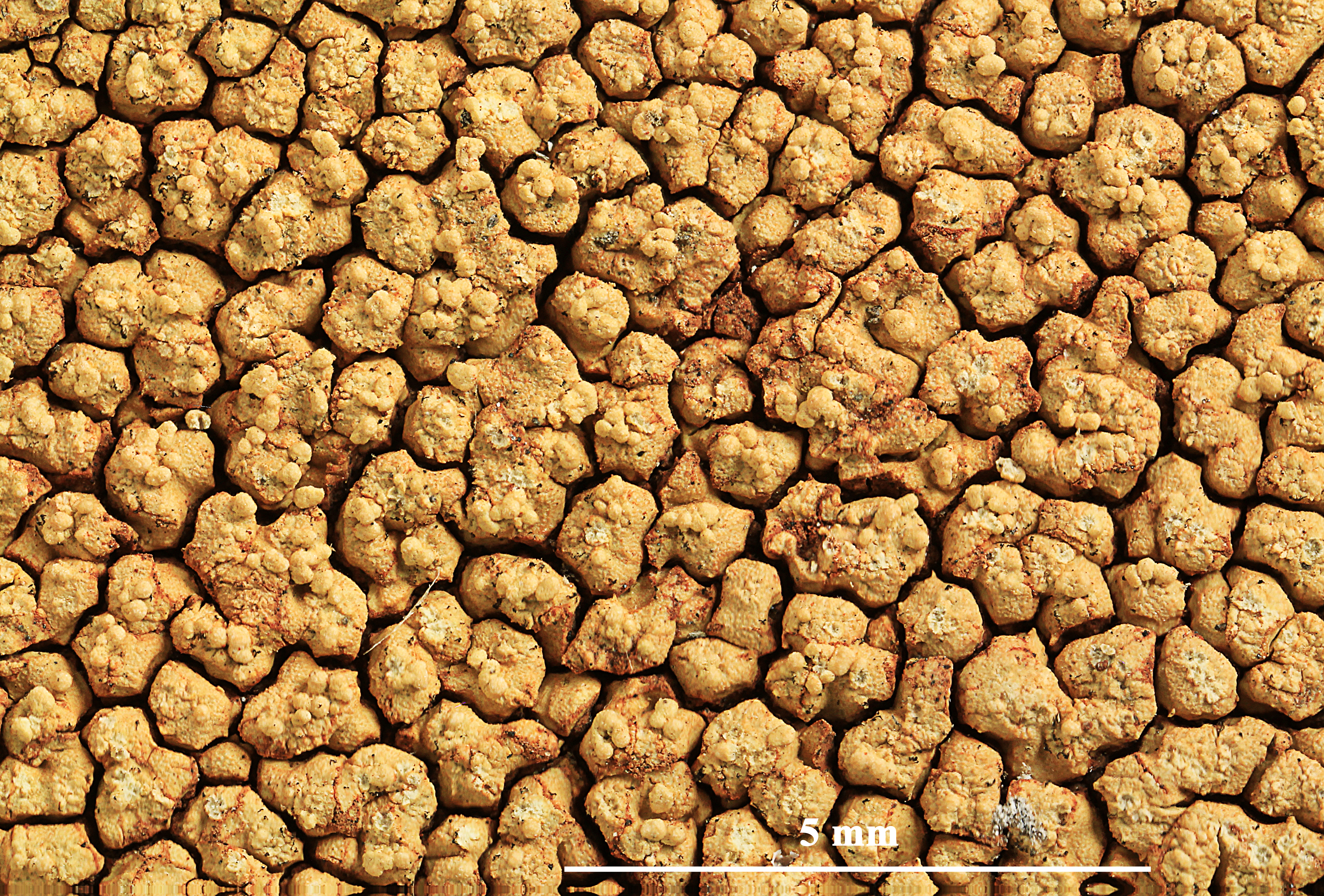
Pertusaria rupicola (example shown) is the host lichen for Lichenostigma rupicolae.

Lichenostigma rupicolae was described in 2010 by Samantha Fernández-Brime and colleagues after they repeatedly encountered an unfamiliar black fungus growing on the crustose lichen species Pertusaria rupicola in Mediterranean Europe. The holotype, collected at 350 m elevation on acidic schists near Cadaqués in Catalonia, Spain, is housed in the Universitat de Barcelona herbarium. On morphological grounds the authors placed the fungus in Lichenostigma subgenus Lichenogramma (family Lichenotheliaceae, order Arthoniales): members of this group are characterised by superficial, radiating bundles of hyphae that link irregular stromatic ascomata lacking a true hamathecium. L. rupicolae differs from all previously known congeners in three linked traits: (i) its sparsely-branched but conspicuously radial hyphal "strands", (ii) relatively large brown spores divided by one or two cross-walls (septa), and (iii) the production of multicellular black macroconidia on those same strands. The fungus appears to be strictly host specific, having been recorded only on P. rupicola at scattered localities in France, Spain and Turkey.

== Description ==
The parasite manifests as soot-black patches on the thallus and apothecia (fruiting bodies) of Pertusaria rupicola. Closer inspection reveals that each patch is a loose fan of microscopic hyphal "cords": individual cords lie on the lichen surface, measure roughly 150–350 micrometres (μm) long by 15–42 μm wide, and comprise four to six parallel rows of tiny, dark-walled cells. In young infections these cords radiate neatly from a centre, but as they age the pattern becomes irregular and the middle of the patch swells into discrete fertile cushions (stromata).

The stromata are superficial, black and somewhat lumpy, typically 55–90 μm across (occasionally up to 120 μm). Their wall is built of densely pigmented cells while the inner tissue is pale; together they enclose a few evanescent, bitunicate asci. Each ascus initially holds eight ascospores, but it soon breaks down so that mature stromata are packed with free spores. The spores are broadly ellipsoid to slightly top-heavy (obovoid), 11–16 μm long and 5.5–9.5 μm wide, and show one or two (rarely three) transverse septa; a longitudinal septum sometimes appears in one cell. They start pale brown with a clear outer sheath and ripen to dark brown with a fine granular ornamentation on the wall. In addition to sexual spores the fungus produces ellipsoid, multi-celled macroconidia (9.5–18.5 × 7.5–14.5 μm) directly on the vegetative cords—propagules thought to aid its spread from thallus to thallus. The infection remains superficial and causes no obvious disfigurement of its host beyond the blackened patches.
