= Lecanora panticapaensis =

Scientific classification
- Domain: Eukaryota
- Kingdom: Fungi
- Division: Ascomycota
- Class: Lecanoromycetes
- Order: Lecanorales
- Family: Lecanoraceae
- Genus: Lecanora
- Species: L. panticapaensis

Binomial name
- Lecanora panticapaensis Khodos., Naumovich, Elix & S.Y.Kondr. (2009)

Species of lichen

Lecanora panticapaensis is a species of saxicolous (rock-dwelling), crustose lichen in the family Lecanoraceae. It occurs in a single locality in Dnipropetrovsk Oblast, Ukraine, where it grows on the vertical surfaces of black schist beside a river.

== Taxonomy ==
The species was formally described as a new species in 2009 by Alexander Khodosovtsev, Ganna Naumovich, John Elix, and Sergey Kondratyuk. The type specimen was collected by the first two authors from the "Skeli MODRu" landscape reserve. Here the lichen was growing on vertical schist outcrops on the banks of the Inhulets river. The species epithet panticapaensis recalls the word Panticapa, which is the Ancient Greek name for the Inhulets river in Ukraine.

Lecanora panticapaensis is a member of a species complex that is named after Lecanora frustulosa and includes (in addition to that species) L. argophilis and L. sphaerospora.

== Description ==
The crustose thallus of Lecanora panticapaensis ranges in colour from grey to greyish-yellow top yellow-green, and reaches a diameter of up to 10 cm (3.9 in) wide. The form of the thallus around its periphery is areolate to lobulate. The areoles are convex, typically 0.6–1.2 in diameter and 0.5–1.5 mm thick. The prothallus is usually indistinct, but if present, it is white and cottony, forming a zone around the thallus about 0.5 cm (0.2 in) wide. Bright yellowish-green soralia are scattered on the thallus surface; the individual soredia are typically 50–60 μm wide, but they can also aggregate to form larger consoredia that are 80–150 μm. Apothecia occur frequently, and are 0.8–1.2 in diameter; they are lecanorine in form with a flat, brown disc encircled by a margin of the same colour. The asci contain eight ascospores, which themselvea are hyaline, ellipsoid in shape, and measure 10.5–13.5 by 5.2–6.8 μm.

Several lichen products occur in Lecanora panticapaensis: atranorin, epanorin, zeorin, and roccellic acid are major constituents; muronic acid and isomuronic acid are minor components, and there are trace amounts of rhizocarpic acid.

== Habitat and distribution ==
Lecanora panticapaensis is only known from the type locality, a riverine habitat lined with vertical schist rocks. Other lichens that occur in the same habitat include Aspicilia cinerea, Candelariella vitellina, and Immersaria cupreoatra.

== See also ==
- List of Lecanora species
