= Aspicilia prestensis =

Scientific classification
- Kingdom: Fungi
- Division: Ascomycota
- Class: Lecanoromycetes
- Order: Pertusariales
- Family: Megasporaceae
- Genus: Aspicilia
- Species: A. prestensis

Binomial name
- Aspicilia prestensis Cl.Roux & A.Nordin (2011)
- Holotype: Prats-de-Mollo-la-Preste, France

Species of lichen-forming fungus

Aspicilia prestensis is a species of rock-dwelling lichen in the family Megasporaceae. Described in 2011 from the French Pyrénées-Orientales, this crustose lichen forms a whitish to ash-grey crust divided into angular patches on non-calcareous rocks at montane to alpine elevations. The species has often been misidentified as Aspicilia cinerea but differs in having larger ascospores, a more strictly high-elevation distribution, and distinct microscopic features of the hymenium.

== Taxonomy ==
Aspicilia prestensis was described as a new species in 2011 by Claude Roux and Anders Nordin, based on material collected in the French Pyrénées-Orientales, near Prats-de-Mollo-la-Preste, on exposed gneiss at about 2,260 m elevation. The name refers to La Preste, the nearby village where the species was first recognised.

The genus Aspicilia is placed in the family Megasporaceae. A. prestensis has often been misidentified as A. cinerea (and, in some regions, as A. epiglypta). DNA sequencing of an isotype (a duplicate) indicates that it is more closely related to A. epiglypta than to A. cinerea. Compared with A. cinerea, it tends to have larger spores and a more strictly montane–alpine ecology, and it differs in microscopic features of the hymenium (the fertile layer inside the fruiting bodies).

== Description ==
Aspicilia prestensis is a crustose lichen with a thallus that is whitish to ash-grey and divided into angular patches (areoles). The thallus is typically 2–7 cm across and about 0.2–0.5 mm thick; the areoles are roughly 0.3–2.4 mm wide, with outer areoles often larger and more subdivided than central ones. A dark marginal line (the hypothallus) may be visible in some specimens.

The apothecia (disc-like fruiting bodies) are small (about 0.2–0.7 mm across), black, and typically sit in the areoles, often several per areole; their discs are dull and finely roughened, without a powdery coating. Microscopically, the asci contain eight colourless spores that are ellipsoid to slightly elongate, about 17.5–24.5 × 9.5–14 μm. The asexual propagules (conidia) are thread-like and about 14.5–21 × 1 μm, straight to slightly curved. Chemical spot tests on the thallus are typically K+ (yellow turning blood-red) and P+ (yellow to yellow-orange), consistent with norstictic acid as the main lichen substance.

== Habitat and distribution ==
This is a rock-dwelling species that grows on exposed, non-calcareous (non-limestone) rocks, including gently sloping rock surfaces and boulders. It is reported from montane to alpine elevations, and tends to occur in open sites, often in full sun, though it can tolerate a range of light conditions.

It is known from the Pyrénées-Orientales, the Massif Central, and the Alps, where it appears to be fairly common; the authors also suggest it is likely to be widespread in Europe's non-calcareous high mountains. Because it has frequently been confused with A. cinerea and A. epiglypta, older records under those names may need re-checking in mountainous regions.
