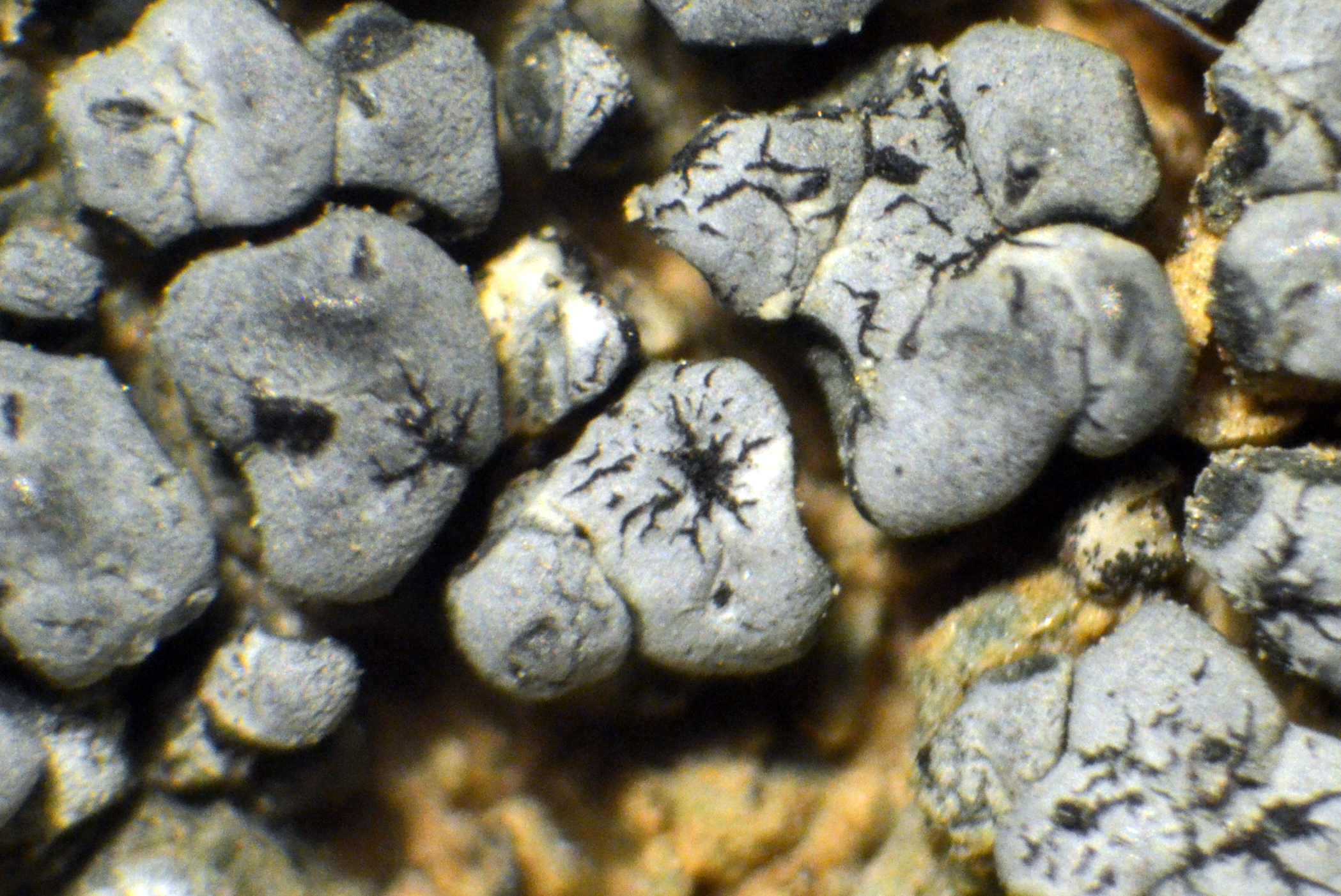
- Aspicilia cyanescens parasitized by the small fungus Lichenostigma elongatum

Scientific classification
- Kingdom: Fungi
- Division: Ascomycota
- Class: Lecanoromycetes
- Order: Pertusariales
- Family: Megasporaceae
- Genus: Aspicilia
- Species: A. cyanescens

Binomial name
- Aspicilia cyanescens Owe-Larss. & A. Nordin

= Aspicilia cyanescens =

Species of lichen

Aspicilia cyanescens (bluish sunken disk lichen) is a rough surfaced, bluish-tinged pale gray rimose to areolate crustose lichen, endemic to California. It mostly grows on rock. It is unique among California members of its genus in that it can sometimes be found on growing on bark or wood, especially incense cedar and sometimes on white fir or giant sequoias in the central Sierra Nevada range and southern California mountains. It has a black or bluish or greenish prothallus. The prothallus is usually absent when growing on rock. Each areole commonly has 1–7 roundish to angular apothecia that are 0.1–1.3 mm in diameter. Apothecia have black to blue-black, concave to flat discs, without pruina. Lichen spot tests are all negative.
