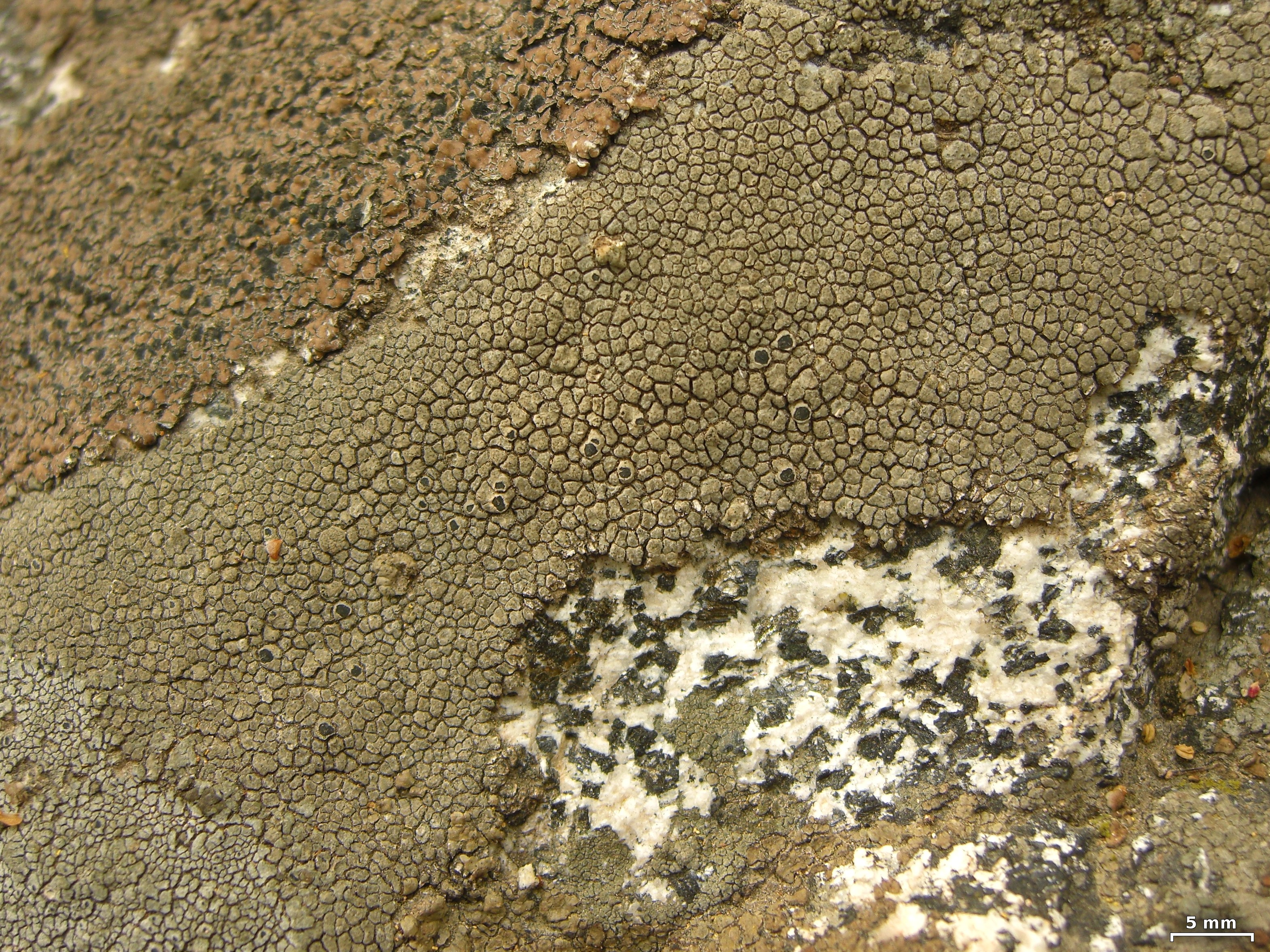

Scientific classification
- Kingdom: Fungi
- Division: Ascomycota
- Class: Lecanoromycetes
- Order: Pertusariales
- Family: Megasporaceae
- Genus: Aspicilia
- Species: A. phaea

Binomial name
- Aspicilia phaea Owe-Larss. & A.Nordin (2007)

= Aspicilia phaea =

Species of lichen

Aspicilia phaea (dusky sunken disk lichen) is a grayish brown to tan areolate crustose lichen commonly found on rock in coastal to inland parts of central and southern California. Described as new to science in 2007, it is endemic to (only found in) California. It grows on exposed or partially shaded siliceous rock, with a few known occurrences on serpentine rock.

In rare cases full areolas do not form, and it appears as being cracked (rimose). There are often grayish or whitish spots on the areolas. The thallus is 2–8 cm in diameter, and 0.1– 1.2 mm thick. The areolas are irregularly sized and angular, giving the lichen body (thallus) the appearance of a mosaic of small polygons. A rim of dark tissue (prothallus) may surround the edges of the lichen. The fruiting body parts (apothecia) are flat to concave (especially in the thallus center), and slightly immersed in the thallus, appearing as sunken round to polygonal discs, often with a grey or white rim of thalline tissue. Lichen spot tests are all negative (K−, C−, KC−, P−).

The photobiont is a chlorococcoid. In Joshua Tree National Park, it is commonly found to be infected with Lichenostigma, a genus or lichenicolous fungi (fungi that are parasitic on lichens).
