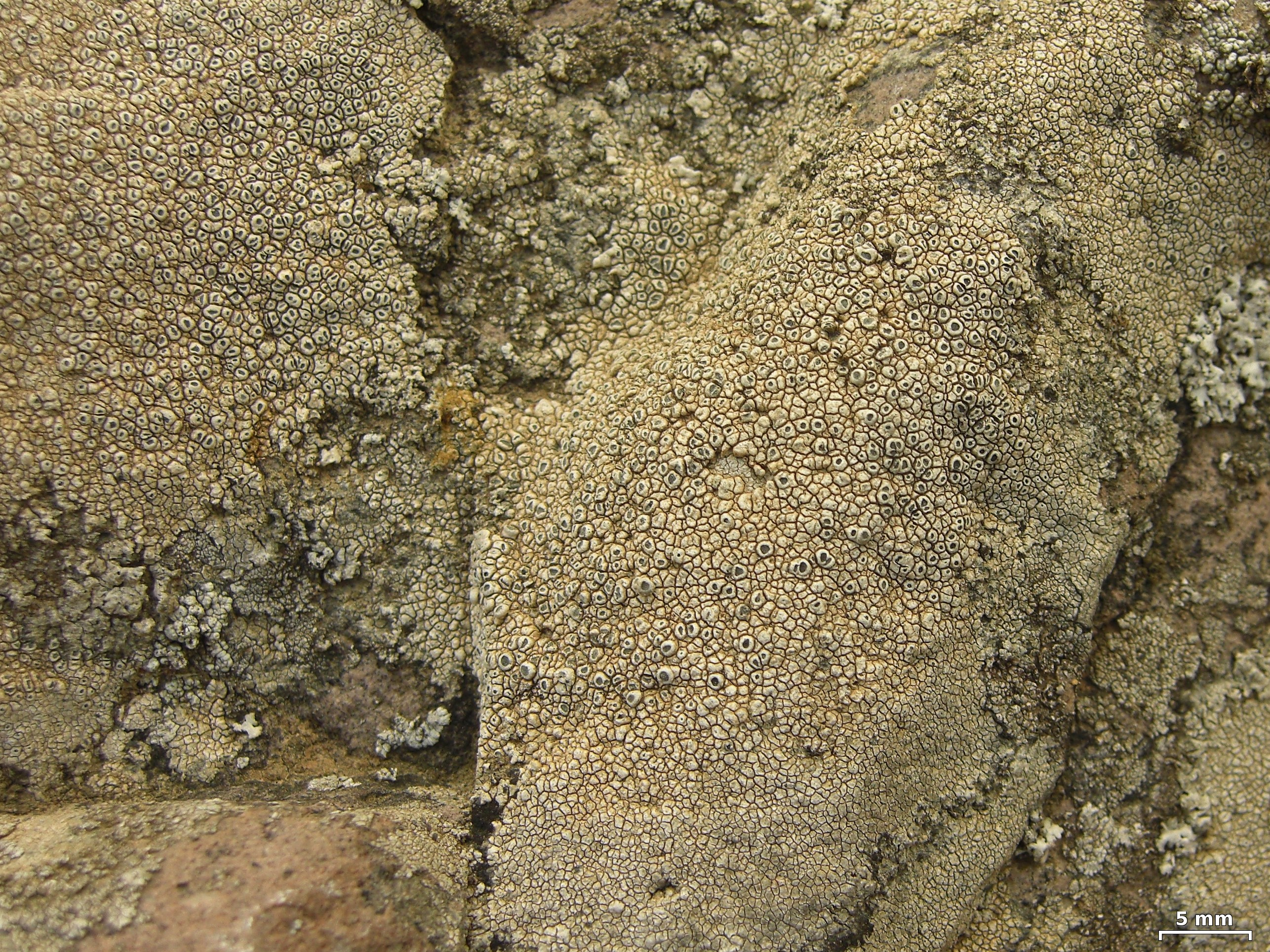

Scientific classification
- Kingdom: Fungi
- Division: Ascomycota
- Class: Lecanoromycetes
- Order: Pertusariales
- Family: Megasporaceae
- Genus: Aspicilia
- Species: A. pacifica

Binomial name
- Aspicilia pacifica Owe-Larss. & A.Nordin (2007)

= Aspicilia pacifica =

Species of fungus

Aspicilia pacifica (pacific sunken disk lichen) is a white to grayish, brownish, or ocher crustose areolate lichen that commonly grows on siliceous rock or basalt along the seashore and in higher coastal mountains of California and Baja California. It has numerous small (0.1–.8 mm), round to angular apothecia toward the middle of the thallus, with concave to flat black discs that are sometimes lightened with white pruina. Lichen spot test on the cortex and medulla are I−, K+ yellow to red, P+ orange, and C−. Secondary metabolites include much stictic acid, and some norstictic acid.
