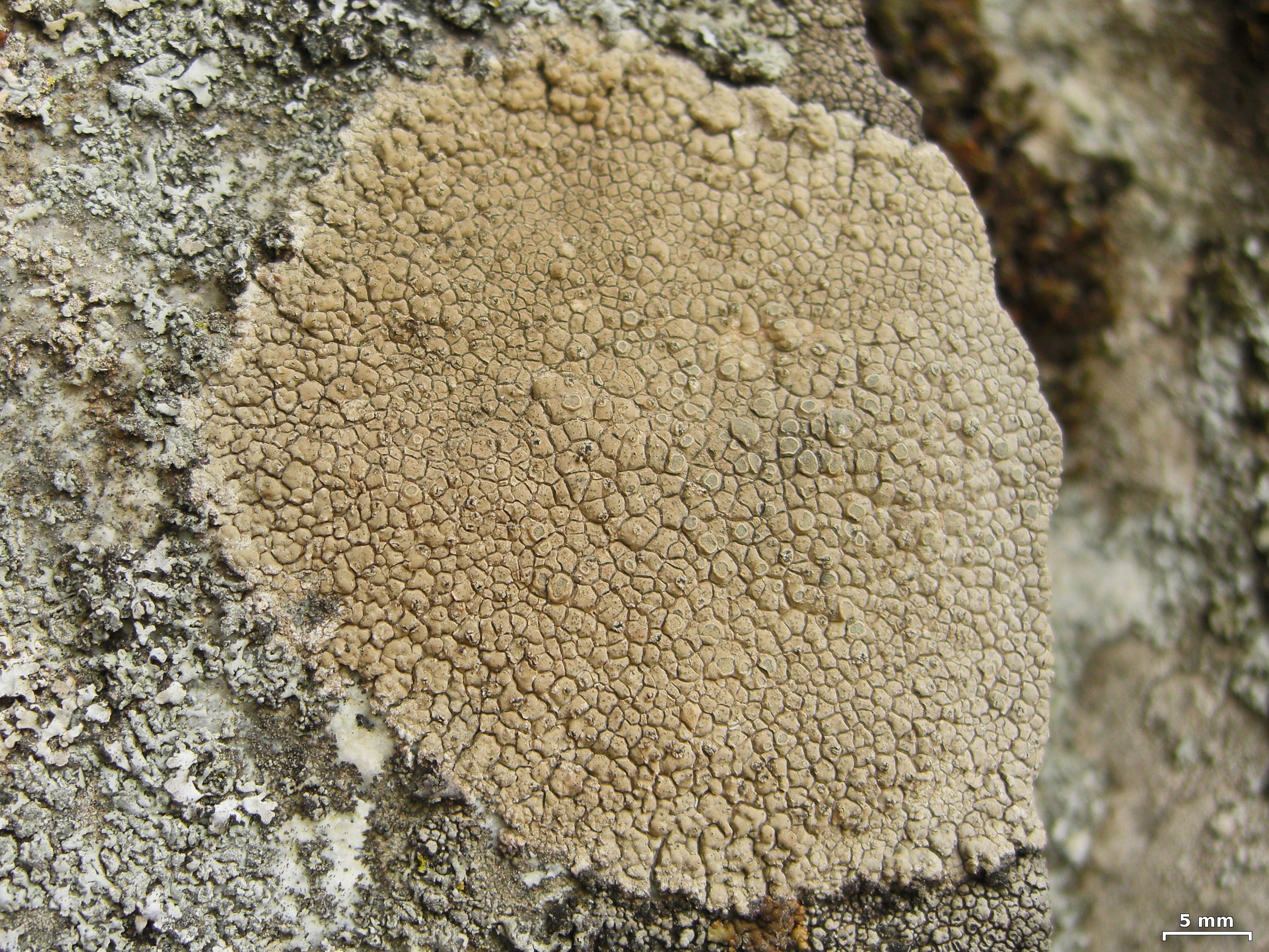

Scientific classification
- Kingdom: Fungi
- Division: Ascomycota
- Class: Lecanoromycetes
- Order: Pertusariales
- Family: Megasporaceae
- Genus: Aspicilia
- Species: A. cuprea

Binomial name
- Aspicilia cuprea Owe-Larss. & A.Nordin (2007)

= Aspicilia cuprea =

Species of lichen

Aspicilia cuprea, the copper sunken disk lichen, is a large 1–20-centimeter (0.4–7.9 in) diameter copperish-tan to brown crustose areolate lichen that forms large patches of adjacent lichens on rock (saxicolous). It grows only from northern California to Baja California. It is common and characteristic of siliceous rock in interior valley and western mountains of California. One to many irregularly shaped black apothecia are sunken into the thallus. Lichen spot tests are K+ red, C−, P+ orange, and I−.
