= Aspicilia californica =

Scientific classification
- Kingdom: Fungi
- Division: Ascomycota
- Class: Lecanoromycetes
- Order: Pertusariales
- Family: Megasporaceae
- Genus: Aspicilia
- Species: A. californica

Binomial name
- Aspicilia californica Rosentr. (1998)

Species of lichen in the family Megasporaceae

Aspicilia californica (shrubby sunken disk lichen) is a small white to white mottled gray or gray-green foliose lichen, with stringy, terete, branch-like lobes. It is endemic to central and southern California, that grows on organic debris, moss, and rock in chaparral habitats. It attaches to the substrate at several points along the branch-like lobes. It may form areoles when growing on more solid substrates. Apothecia are rare. Lichen spot tests on the cortex and medulla are K+ red, KC−, C−, + orange, and I−. The olive brown Aspicilia filiformis is another fruticose species in this mostly crustose genus, occurring in Oregon, Idaho, Utah, Washington and Montana, with one known location also in California.
