= Antarctolichenia =

Scientific classification
- Domain: Eukaryota
- Kingdom: Fungi
- Division: Ascomycota
- Class: Arthoniomycetes
- Order: Lichenostigmatales
- Family: Phaeococcomycetaceae
- Genus: Antarctolichenia; Selbmann, Muggia & Coleine (2021)
- Species: A. onofrii

Binomial name
- Antarctolichenia onofrii Selbmann & Muggia (2021)

Single-species fungal genus

Antarctolichenia is a monospecific fungal genus in the family Phaeococcomycetaceae, containing the single species Antarctolichenia onofrii. Described in 2023 by Laura Selbmann and Lucia Muggia, this endolithic fungus is found exclusively in rock-inhabiting communities in continental Antarctica, particularly in Victoria Land. Antarctolichenia onofrii is notable for its dimorphic growth, exhibiting both yeast-like and filamentous forms, and for its evolutionary position between non-lichenised and lichen-forming fungi. While capable of independent growth, it occasionally associates with Stichococcus-like algae without forming true lichen structures. The species is adapted to extreme Antarctic conditions, growing slowly in sandstone pores within lichen-dominated microbial communities.

== Taxonomy ==
Antarctolichenia onofrii was described in 2023 by Laura Selbmann and Lucia Muggia. The genus Antarctolichenia is monotypic, containing only A. onofrii as its type species. The genus name refers to its Antarctic origin and lichen-like lifestyle, while the species epithet honours the Italian mycologist Silvano Onofri, who collected the rock sample from which the fungus was first isolated during the 1996/97 Italian Antarctic Expedition. The holotype is a cultured strain isolated from cryptoendolithically colonised sandstone collected in Helliwell Hills, Victoria Land, Antarctica. The holotype is preserved in a metabolically inactive state at −150 °C (−238 °F) in the Mycotheca Universitatis Taurinensis (MUT), at the University of Turin in Italy.

Molecular phylogenetic analysis places Antarctolichenia as sister to the genus Etayoa within the Lichenostigmatales. A. onofrii represents an evolutionary connection between non-lichenised and lichen-forming fungi. It exhibits traits of both lifestyles – it can grow independently but also associates loosely with algae, though without forming true lichen structures. This intermediate nature, along with its phylogenetic position, suggests Antarctolichenia may represent either a primitive form of lichenisation arising from a rock-inhabiting ancestor, or a transitional state from lichenised to free-living, not yet fully independent from algal associations.

The species is notable for being dimorphic, able to grow in both yeast-like and filamentous forms. This dimorphism is unusual and provides A. onofrii with adaptability to environmental stresses.

== Description ==
Antarctolichenia onofrii is a strictly rock-inhabiting, endolithic, and asexual fungus. It forms slow-growing, black colonies in culture, reaching about 1 cm (0.4 in) in diameter after a year. The fungus exhibits dimorphic growth, capable of developing both yeast-like and filamentous forms.

The yeast-like form consists of isodiametric cells measuring 5–10 μm in diameter. These cells have a thick, slightly verrucose cell wall that becomes heavily melanised in mature cells but remains almost hyaline (translucent) in young stages.

The filamentous form produces branching hyphae composed of rectangular to oblong cells, measuring 4–5 by 5–6 μm. These cells also have a melanised and slightly verrucose cell wall. Isodiametric cells are sometimes present at hyphal branching points and occasionally form entire hyphae.

Antarctolichenia onofrii occasionally grows in association with Stichococcus-like algae, but does not form haustoria-like structures or a more organized lichen-like thallus. No sexual reproduction, conidiomata, or ascomata (fruiting bodies) have been observed. The fungus is adapted to the extreme conditions of its Antarctic habitat, thriving in cryptoendolithic communities within sandstone. Its melanization and dimorphic growth likely contribute to its survival in this harsh environment.

== Habitat and distribution ==
Antarctolichenia onofrii is known to occur only in continental Antarctica, specifically from various locations in Victoria Land. Its distribution includes both southern and northern Victoria Land, with collected specimens ranging from the McMurdo Dry Valleys to the Helliwell Hills.

The species is a cryptoendolith, inhabiting the pore spaces of rocks, particularly sandstone. It is found in endolithic lichen-dominated communities, which represent the main form of microbial life in the extremely cold and hyper-arid desert environments of Antarctica. These communities are complex assemblages of various microorganisms, including bacteria, chlorophytes, and both free-living and lichen-forming fungi. A. onofrii is adapted to survive in one of the most extreme terrestrial environments on Earth. The McMurdo Dry Valleys, where it has been found, are characterised by extremely low temperatures, minimal precipitation (3–50 mm water equivalent annually), and very low availability of liquid water. In some locations where A. onofrii occurs, there has been no recorded precipitation for nearly two million years.
