= Daegwallyeong =

Mountain pass in South Korea

Coordinates: 37°41′03″N 128°45′15″E

- Hangul: 대관령
- Hanja: 大關嶺
- RR: Daegwallyeong
- MR: Taegwallyŏng

Daegwallyeong (Korean: 대관령; Hanja: 大關嶺) is a 832-meter (2,730 ft)-high mountain pass in the Taebaek Mountains of eastern South Korea. It runs between Pyeongchang and Gangneung in Gangwon Province. It is an important historical pass that connects the regions of Yeongseo and Yeongdong. Daegwallyeong-myeon of Pyeongchang County is named after this pass. Daegwallyeong Museum is located in Gangneung.

This mountain pass was used for delivering agricultural and marine products from Gangneung to Yeongseo.

During the Joseon period, Seonbi walked over this way to go to Hanyang to take the gwageo.

The Old Daegwallyeong way used to be one of the sections of Yeongdong Expressway. The highway has been turned into a local road, which helped reduce the traffic along the way. The Old Daegwallyeong way is 19.1 km long. In the middle of the way, there is a divided way into a route that goes down all the way (1hr 50min), and another route that goes up to Daegwallyeong Museum or Gamagol Village (2hrs 20min).

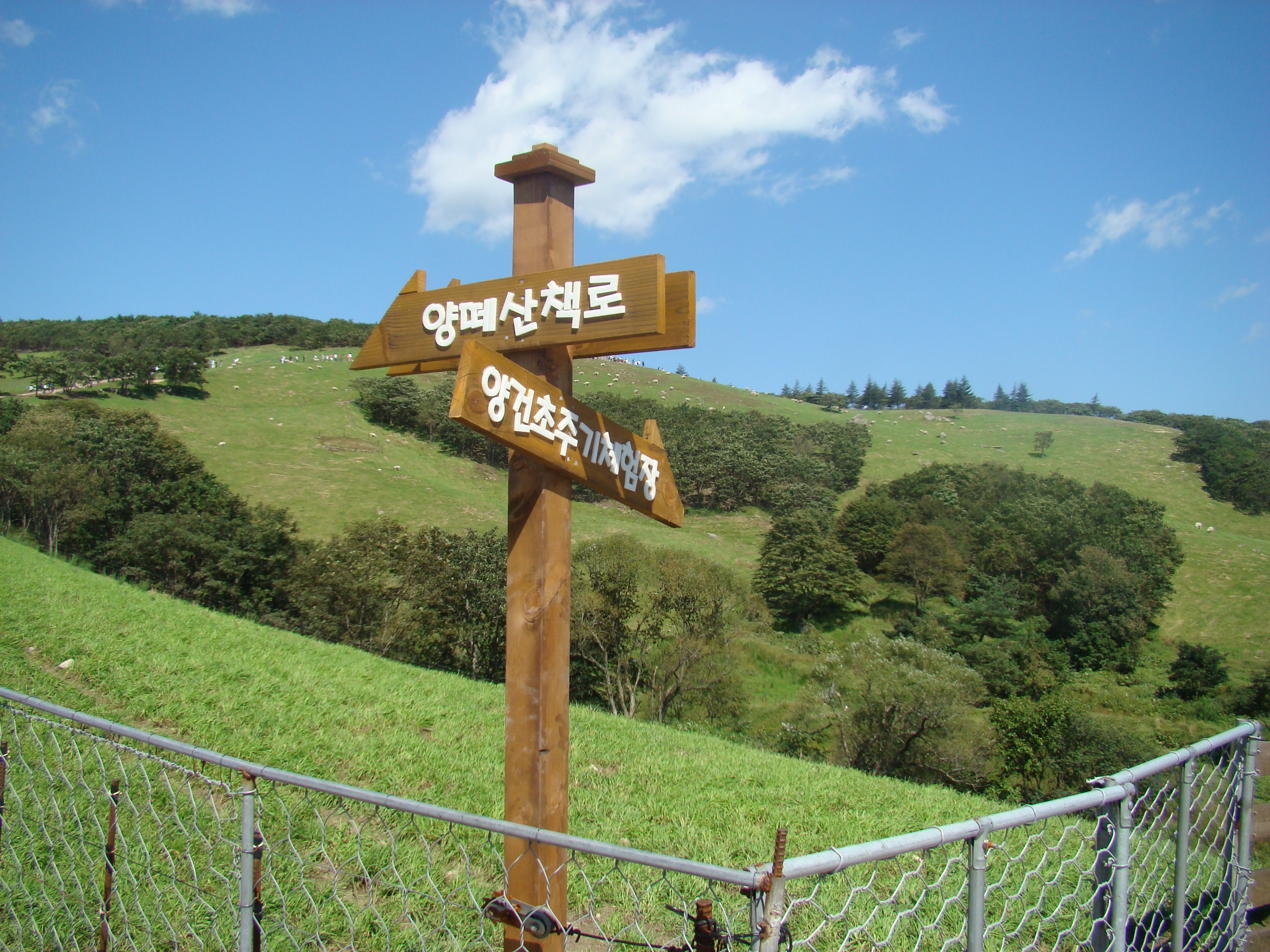
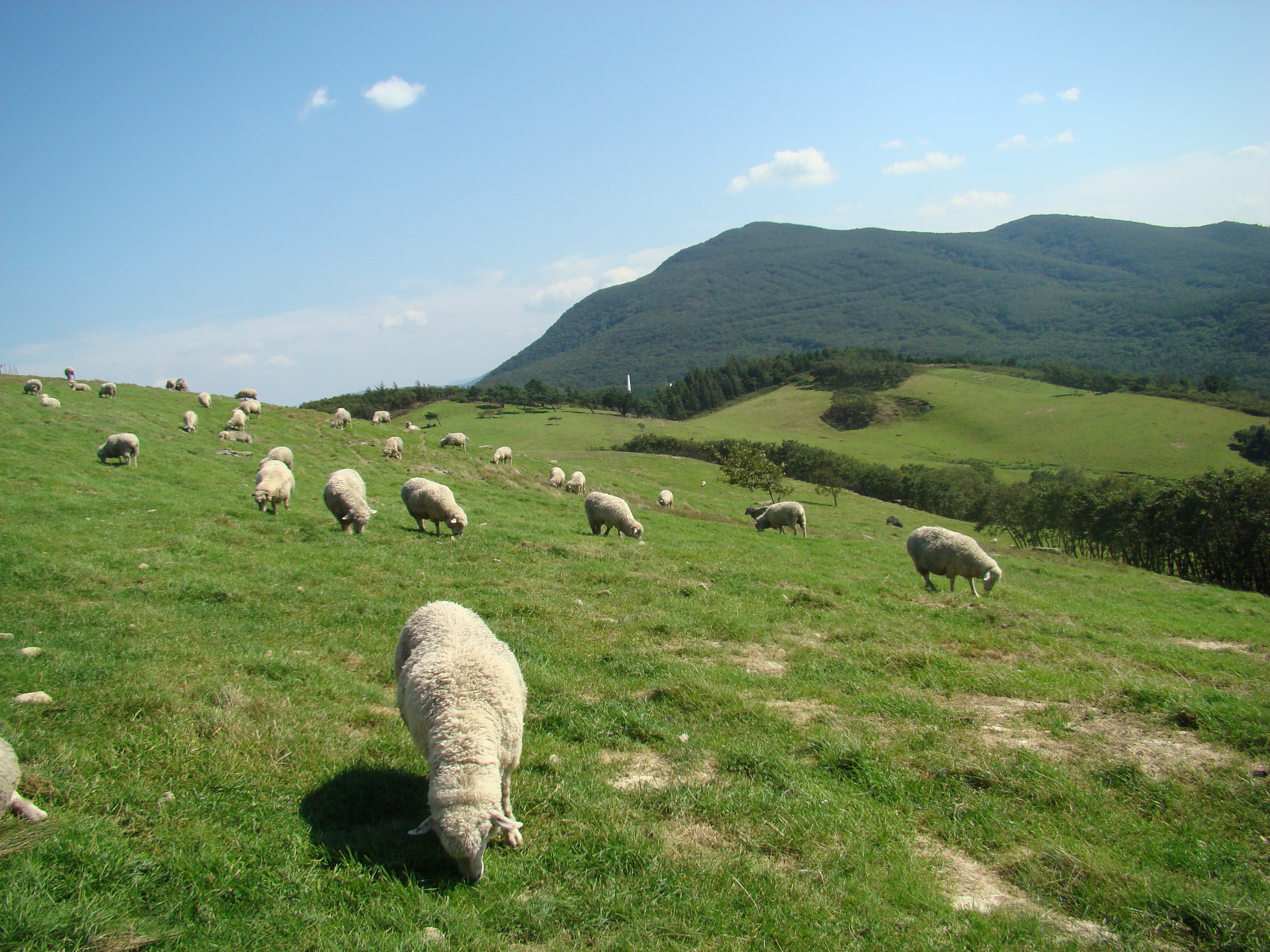
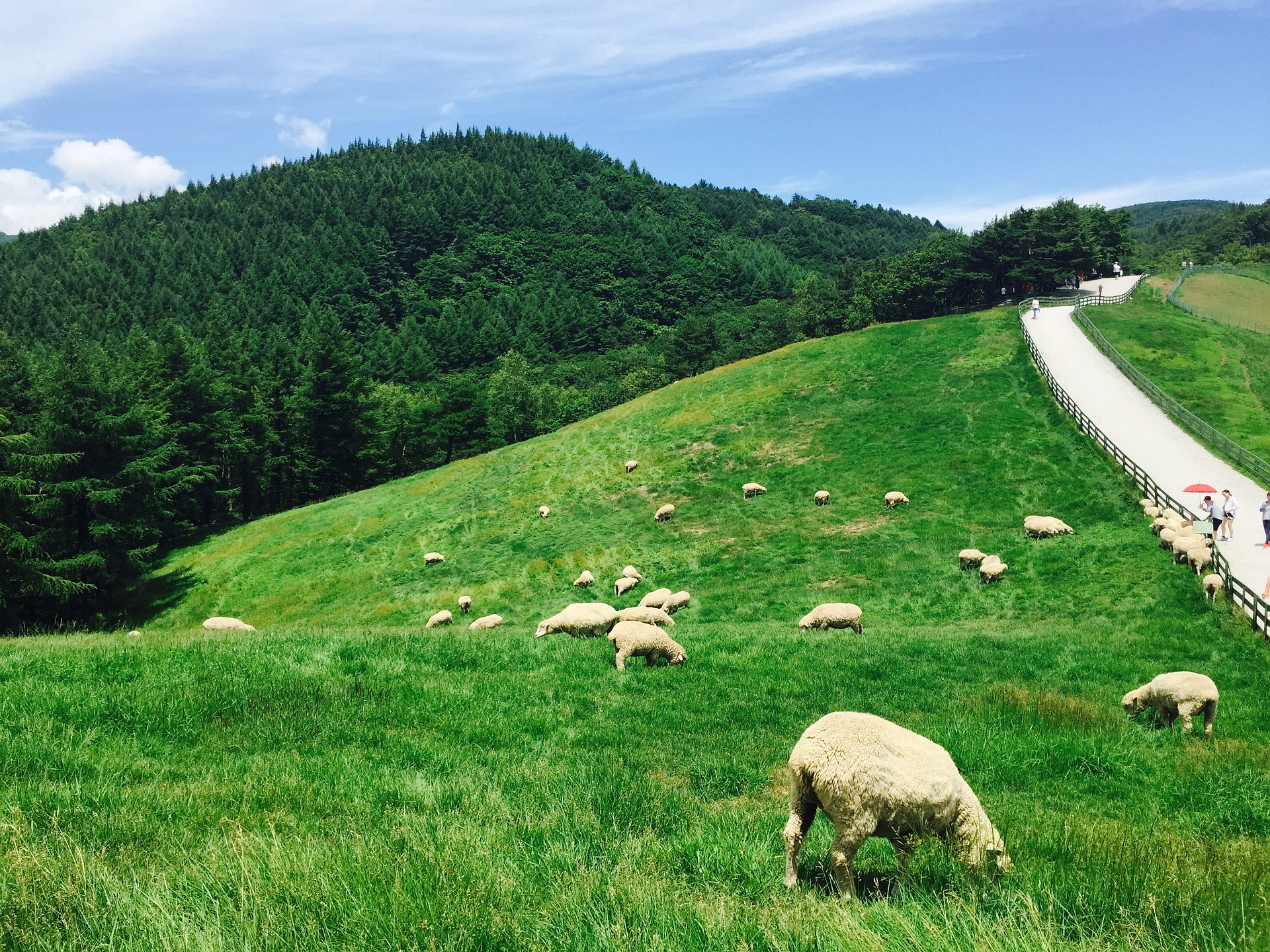
Scenery of Daegwallyeong

== Climate ==
Climate data for Daegwallyeong, Pyeongchang (1991–2020 normals, extremes 1971–present)
Month	Jan	Feb	Mar	Apr	May	Jun	Jul	Aug	Sep	Oct	Nov	Dec	Year
Record high °C (°F)	9.3 (48.7)	16.5 (61.7)	20.5 (68.9)	30.1 (86.2)	31.0 (87.8)	32.3 (90.1)	32.9 (91.2)	32.7 (90.9)	29.0 (84.2)	26.1 (79.0)	21.5 (70.7)	13.5 (56.3)	32.9 (91.2)
Mean daily maximum °C (°F)	−1.8 (28.8)	0.6 (33.1)	5.5 (41.9)	12.9 (55.2)	18.4 (65.1)	21.3 (70.3)	23.4 (74.1)	23.6 (74.5)	19.4 (66.9)	14.6 (58.3)	7.5 (45.5)	0.5 (32.9)	12.2 (54.0)
Daily mean °C (°F)	−7.0 (19.4)	−4.6 (23.7)	0.4 (32.7)	7.0 (44.6)	12.5 (54.5)	16.2 (61.2)	19.6 (67.3)	19.7 (67.5)	14.6 (58.3)	8.8 (47.8)	2.3 (36.1)	−4.5 (23.9)	7.1 (44.8)
Mean daily minimum °C (°F)	−12.2 (10.0)	−10.1 (13.8)	−4.7 (23.5)	1.2 (34.2)	6.8 (44.2)	11.6 (52.9)	16.6 (61.9)	16.5 (61.7)	10.4 (50.7)	3.5 (38.3)	−2.6 (27.3)	−9.4 (15.1)	2.3 (36.1)
Record low °C (°F)	−28.9 (−20.0)	−27.6 (−17.7)	−23.0 (−9.4)	−14.6 (5.7)	−4.7 (23.5)	−1.7 (28.9)	4.4 (39.9)	3.3 (37.9)	−2.3 (27.9)	−9.9 (14.2)	−18.7 (−1.7)	−24.7 (−12.5)	−28.9 (−20.0)
Average precipitation mm (inches)	53.1 (2.09)	49.2 (1.94)	72.6 (2.86)	93.5 (3.68)	108.2 (4.26)	162.5 (6.40)	336.3 (13.24)	368.4 (14.50)	249.6 (9.83)	97.6 (3.84)	69.4 (2.73)	34.7 (1.37)	1,695.1 (66.74)
Average precipitation days (≥ 0.1 mm)	9.4	8.9	11.2	10.4	10.8	12.9	17.8	18.1	13.1	8.9	10.2	8.5	140.2
Average snowy days	13.0	11.8	12.0	3.3	0.2	0.0	0.0	0.0	0.0	0.8	5.2	10.9	57.2
Average relative humidity (%)	66.3	65.7	65.8	61.9	67.5	79.4	86.2	87.2	85.5	76.8	70.3	66.6	73.3
Mean monthly sunshine hours	199.3	193.5	210.9	223.1	237.2	192.4	143.0	138.2	149.6	196.2	177.2	193.3	2,253.9
Percentage possible sunshine	64.4	60.8	54.6	57.4	52.1	40.7	30.8	31.0	38.6	55.5	57.8	64.3	49.3
Source: Korea Meteorological Administration (snow and percent sunshine 1981–2010)

== Season ==
Daegwallyeong is located at a height of more than 800 meters (2,600 ft), so overall, the annual average temperature is lower, and the precipitation is higher than that of other parts of the Republic of Korea.

In spring, as the Siberian air fleet retreats, it is not relatively cold, and only the chilly weather continues. In summer, it is cool and not hot unlike other areas because of the nature of the highlands. In particular, due to the high atmospheric pressure of the North Pacific Ocean, southwest air currents blow in and the characteristics of the windy areas, torrential rains are more frequent.

In autumn, relatively clear and clear weather continues, with temperatures falling below zero. Also, frost or snow is observed earlier than other regions in Korea. In winter, it is considered one of the most snowy places with temperatures of minus 15 °C.
