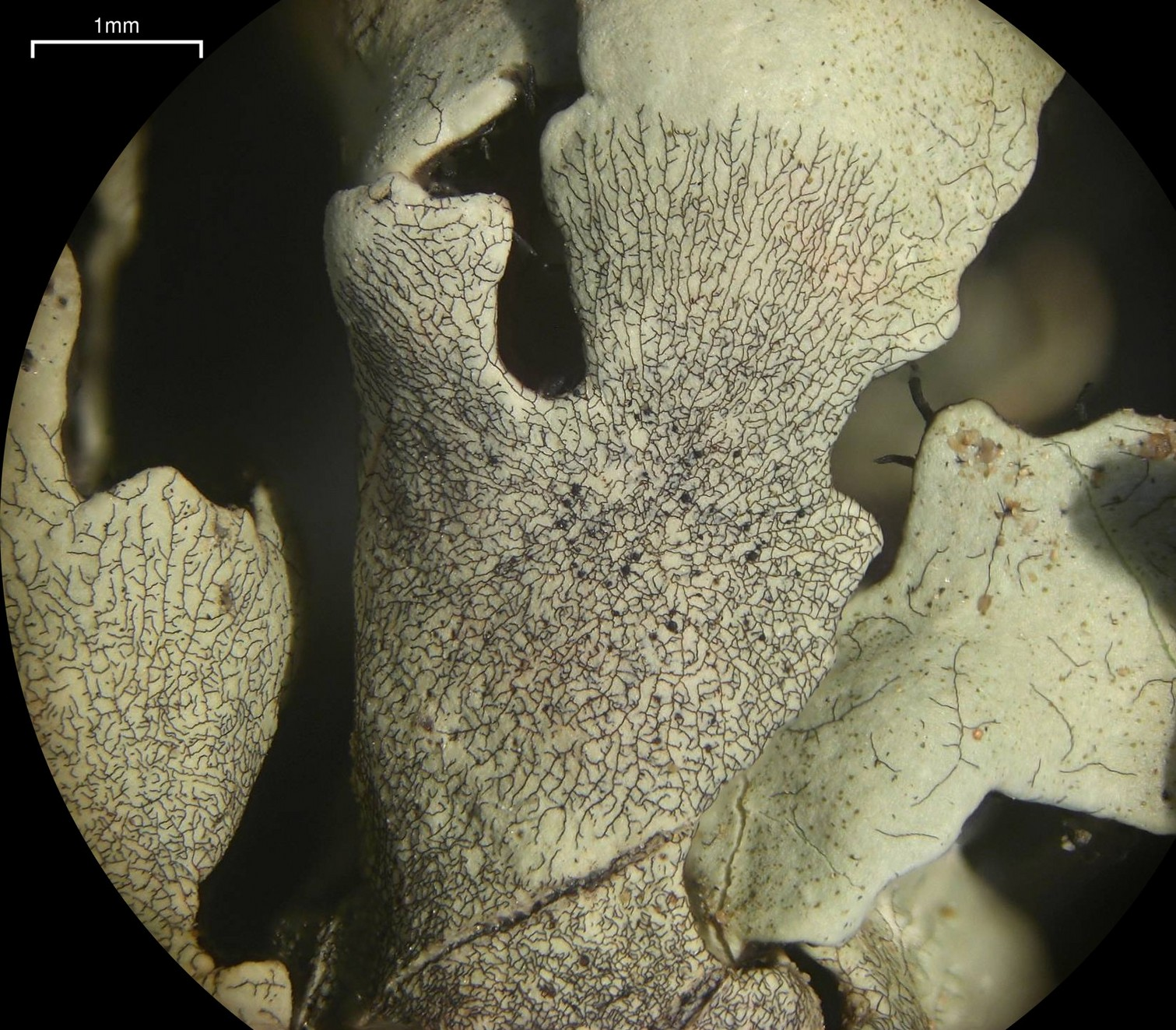
- Lichenostigma cosmopolites

Scientific classification
- Domain: Eukaryota
- Kingdom: Fungi
- Division: Ascomycota
- Class: Arthoniomycetes
- Order: Lichenostigmatales
- Family: Phaeococcomycetaceae
- Genus: Lichenostigma; Hafellner (1983)

Type species
- Lichenostigma maureri Hafellner (1983)

Synonyms
- Phaeosporobolus D.Hawksw. & Hafellner (1986)

= Lichenostigma =

Genus of fungi

Lichenostigma is a genus of fungi in the family Phaeococcomycetaceae. It includes several species which are lichenicolous (i.e. parasitic on lichens). The genus was circumscribed in 1983 by the Austrian mycologist Josef Hafellner, with Lichenostigma maureri assigned as the type species.

== Description ==
Lichenostigma is a lichen-dwelling (lichenicolous) fungus that forms no independent thallus and shows little, if any, surface mycelium of its own. Its reproductive structures (ascostromata) appear scattered across the host lichen as dark brown to blackish swellings. When young these bodies are roughly spherical, but they often become elongate with age and may develop a shallow central depression; very old specimens can even mimic the lirellae of script lichens. The stromatic wall is made of thick-walled, budding cells: the outer layers are dark brown and frequently display a warted or mosaic-like texture, whereas the internal cells remain pale. At maturity the stromata break down irregularly, releasing their ascospores.

Unlike many ascomycetes, Lichenostigma lacks a well-defined hymenial cavity and any hamathecium. The asci—usually four to eight per stroma—develop directly among the stromatic cells without discrete locules. They are nearly shperical to broadly ellipsoidal, sit almost sessile on the stroma, and have a very thickened apex with a distinct ocular chamber; although structurally fissitunicate, they often deliquesce as they ripen. The ascospores are initially colourless, sometimes showing a faint blue staining reaction to potassium iodide in the outer wall, but they may darken to brown when over-mature. Each spore is one-septate, ellipsoidal to elongate, and ends in either rounded or slightly pointed tips.

Asexual reproduction is common and takes place in pycnidial structures that are macroscopically indistinguishable from the ascostromata. These conidiomata produce no conidiophores; instead, pale- to medium-brown conidiogenous cells arise directly from the stromatic tissue. Each cell repeatedly buds off multicellular, brown conidia that resemble miniature cell clusters—ellipsoidal overall and initially smooth, though they can become warted or spiny in very old material.

== Fossil history ==
The fossil history of Lichenostigma provides insights into its ancient origins and long-standing ecological relationships. Discoveries from European Paleogene amber have identified two fossil specimens of Lichenostigma associated with the crustose lichen genus Ochrolechia. These fossils date back approximately 34 million years, to the uppermost Eocene. The presence of Lichenostigma in these amber inclusions confirms that both the genus and its specialised parasitic association with Ochrolechia were already well-established during this period. The fossilised Lichenostigma specimens have conidiomata and ascomata (specialised structures to produce asexual and sexual spores, respectively) that are morphologically similar to those of modern species, demonstrating the evolutionary continuity of these lichenicolous fungi. This discovery not only pushes back the minimum age of the genus Lichenostigma but also provides calibration points for phylogenetic studies.

The identification of Lichenostigma in amber fossils marks a significant advancement in paleomycology, particularly regarding the fossil record of lichenicolous fungi. Prior to these findings, evidence of ancient lichen-associated microfungi was limited to more general and likely saprotrophic associations. The Lichenostigma fossils, however, represent the first concrete evidence of mycoparasitic relationships in the fossil record, highlighting the ecological importance of these interactions.

== Species ==
As of July 2024, Species Fungorum (in the Catalogue of Life) accepts 30 species of Lichenostigma.

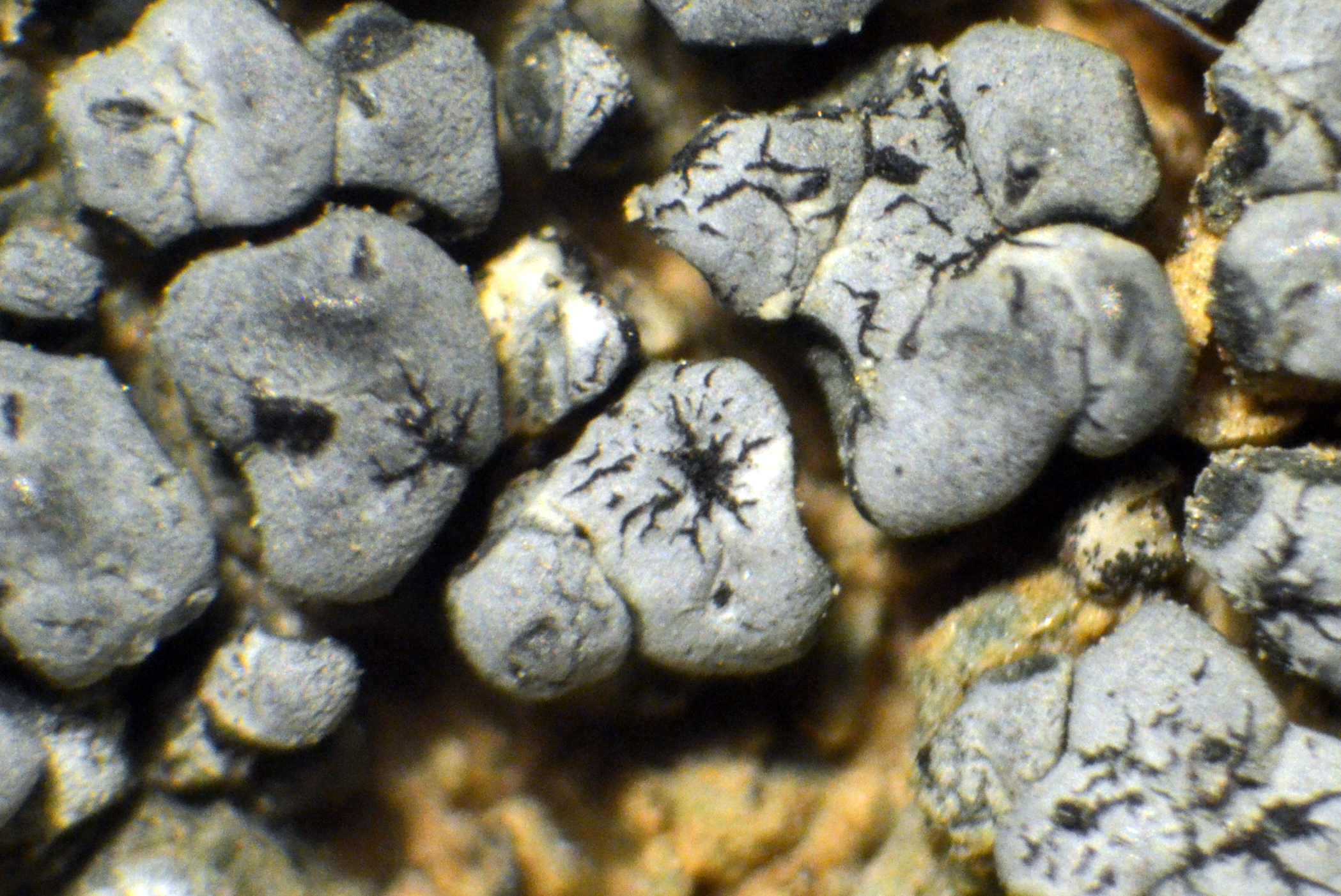
Lichenostigma elongatum

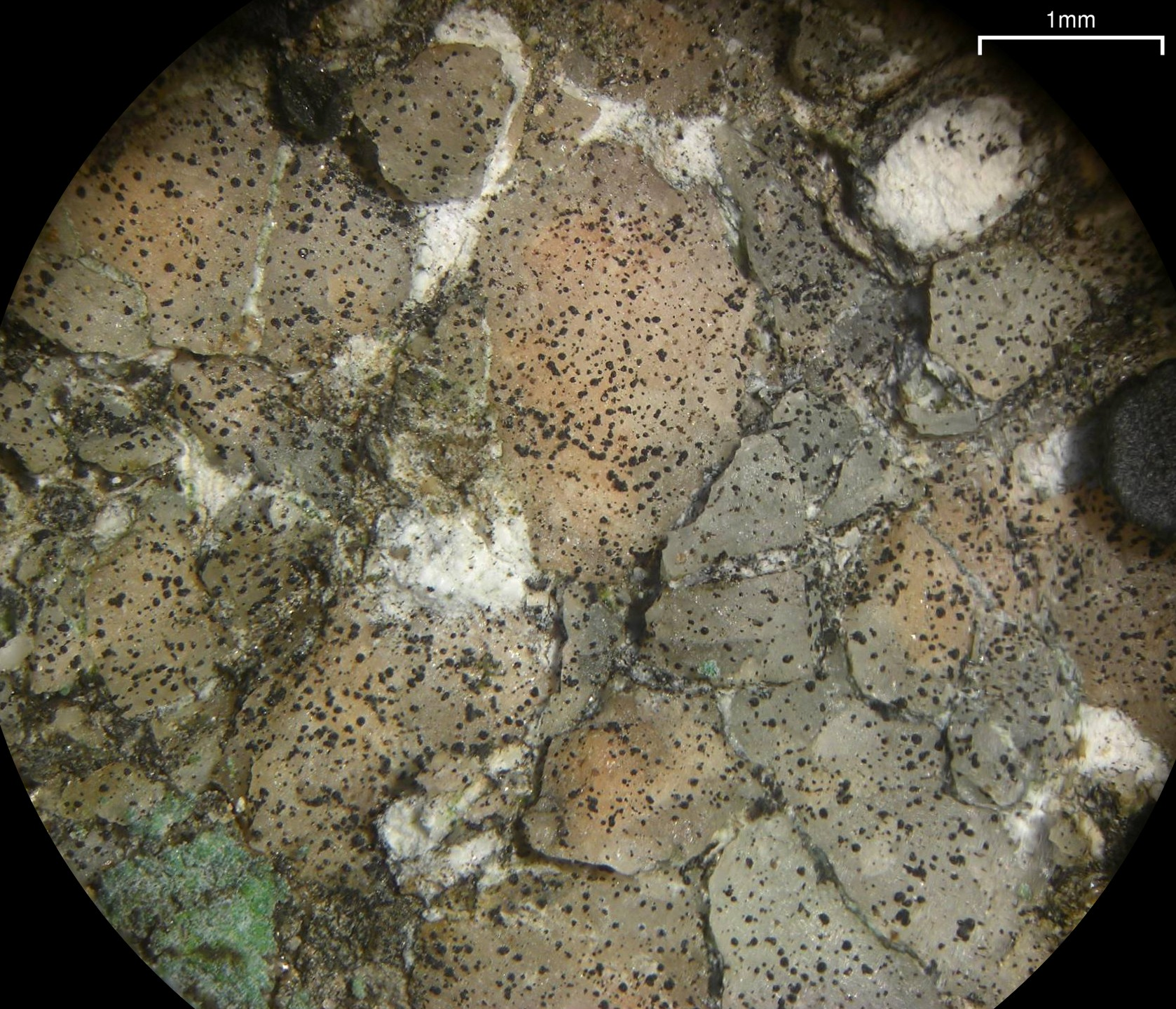
Lichenostigma saxicola growing on bare granitic rock and neighbouring thalli of Aspicilia confusa and Lecidea laboriosa.

- Lichenostigma alpinum (R.Sant., Alstrup & D.Hawksw.) Ertz & Diederich (2014)
- Lichenostigma amplum Calat. & Hafellner (2004)
- Lichenostigma anatolicum Halıcı & Kocakaya (2009)
- Lichenostigma bolacinae Nav.-Ros., Calat. & Hafellner (2004)
- Lichenostigma canariense Etayo & van den Boom (2006) – Canary Islands
- Lichenostigma chlaroterae (F.Berger & Brackel) Ertz & Diederich (2014)
- Lichenostigma cosmopolites Hafellner & Calat. (1999)
- Lichenostigma cupreogriseae P.Pinault & Cl.Roux (2021)
- Lichenostigma dimelaenae Calat. & Hafellner (2004)
- Lichenostigma diploiciae Calat., Nav.-Ros. & Hafellner (2002)
- Lichenostigma elongatum Nav.-Ros. & Hafellner (1996)
- Lichenostigma epipolinum Nav.-Ros., Calat. & Hafellner (2002)
- Lichenostigma epiporpidiae S.Y.Kondr., Lőkös & Hur (2017)
- Lichenostigma epirupestre Pérez-Ort. & Calat. (2009) – Europe
- Lichenostigma episulphurellum Etayo & van den Boom (2006) – Canary Islands
- Lichenostigma epiumbilicariae P.Pinault & Cl.Roux (2023)
- Lichenostigma fellhanerae (R.C.Harris & Lendemer) Ertz & Diederich (2014)
- Lichenostigma gracile Calat., Nav.-Ros. & Hafellner (2002)
- Lichenostigma heterodermiae S.Y.Kondr., Lőkös & Hur (2013)
- Lichenostigma iranicum Valadb. (2011) – Iran
- Lichenostigma lecanorae Calat. & Nav.-Ros. (2004)
- Lichenostigma maureri Hafellner (1983)
- Lichenostigma radicans Calat. & Barreno (2003)
- Lichenostigma rouxii Nav.-Ros., Calat. & Hafellner (2002)
- Lichenostigma rupicolae Fern.-Brime & Nav.-Ros. (2010)
- Lichenostigma saxicola K.Knudsen & Kocourk. (2010) – California
- Lichenostigma spermatomanis P.Pinault & Cl.Roux (2021)
- Lichenostigma subradians Hafellner, Calat. & Nav.-Ros. (2002)
- Lichenostigma supertegentis Ihlen & R.Sant. (2004) – Scandinavia
- Lichenostigma svandae Vondrák & Šoun (2007)
- Lichenostigma triseptatum Halıcı & D.Hawksw. (2007)
- Lichenostigma verrucosum Valadb. (2011) – Iran
