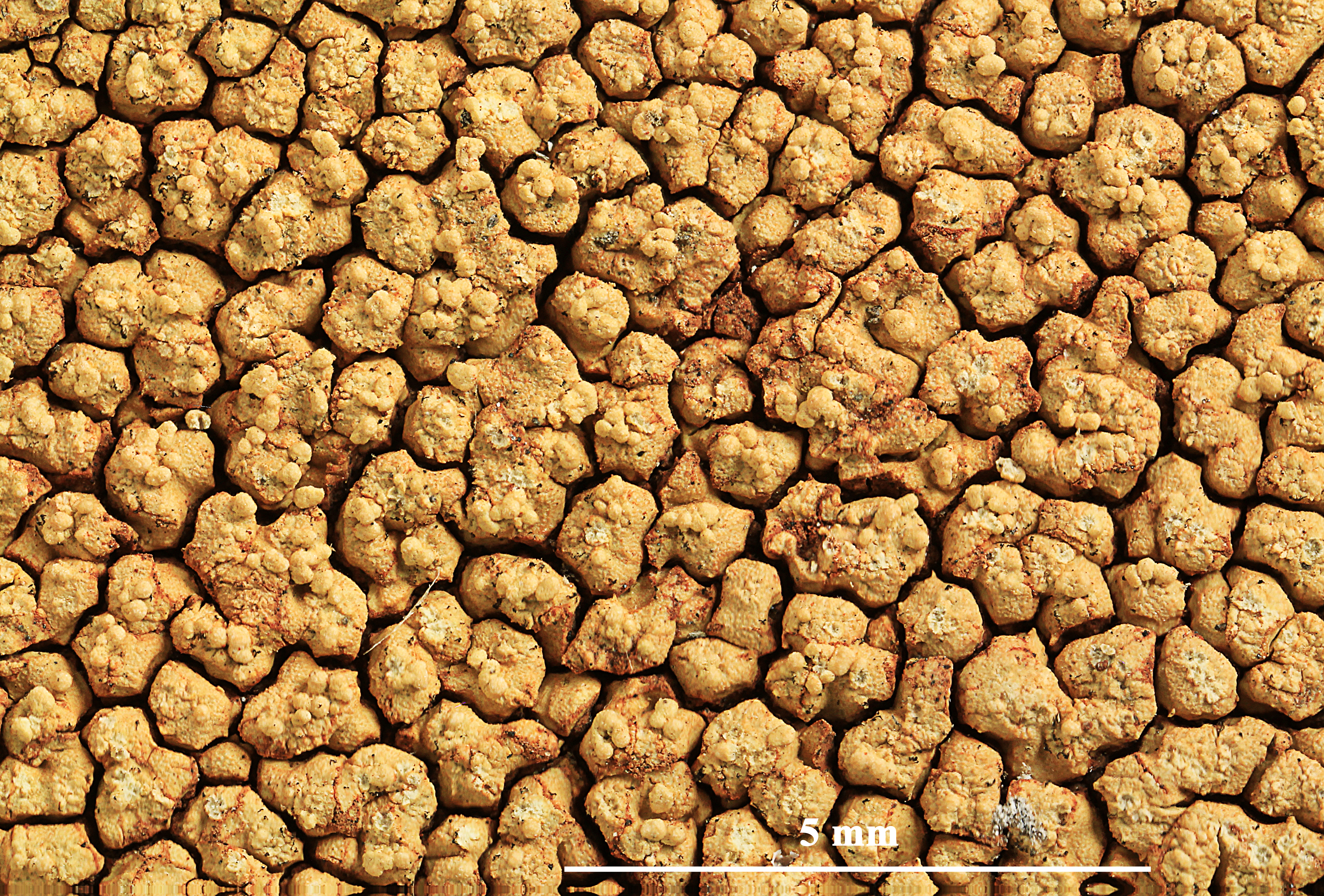

Scientific classification
- Kingdom: Fungi
- Division: Ascomycota
- Class: Lecanoromycetes
- Order: Pertusariales
- Family: Pertusariaceae
- Genus: Pertusaria
- Species: P. rupicola

Binomial name
- Pertusaria rupicola (Sommerf.) Harm. (1898)

Synonyms
- Endocarpon fallax var. rupicola Sommerf. (1826)

= Pertusaria rupicola =

Species of crustose lichen

Pertusaria rupicola is a species of saxicolous (rock-dwelling) crustose lichen belonging to the family Pertusariaceae. It is characterized by its thick, brain-like folded thallus that appears grey-greenish or yellow-green in colour. This organism produces distinctive wart-like fruiting bodies with black to pale yellow-brown openings. Native to the Mediterranean region, it grows primarily on steep, north-facing siliceous rock surfaces in well-lit but indirect sunlight environments. The species has experienced population declines following wildfires due to its slow growth rate. P. rupicola also serves as a host for the lichenicolous fungus species Lichenostigma rupicolae.

== Description ==
Pertusaria rupicola has a thick thallus (the main body of the lichen) with a cracked-areolate and verrucose to cerebriform texture, resembling brain-like folds in well-developed specimens. The thallus typically appears grey-greenish or yellow-green in colour and lacks both soredia (powdery vegetative reproductive structures) and isidia (small cylindrical outgrowths for vegetative reproduction). The species produces fruiting bodies (apothecia) within fertile, lecanorine verrucae (wart-like structures containing algal cells). These verrucae are rounded, measuring 1–3 mm in diameter, and are usually numerous and tightly arranged on the thallus surface. The margin of these structures is thick and smooth, matching the colour of the surrounding thallus. The hymenium (the spore-producing layer) often contains sterile areas.

The ostioles (openings through which spores are released) are matt black to pale yellow-brown in colour. They initially appear as small dots (punctiform) but later develop into open structures reaching up to 1.5 mm in diameter. The lichen produces ascospores within asci (spore-producing sacs), typically with eight spores per ascus (sometimes as few as 6). These ascospores have a distinctive double and smooth wall structure and measure 70–100 by 30–50 μm.

Chemical spot testing reveals that the thallus is K+ (yellow), C+ (orange), KC+ (orange), and Pd+ (red-orange). The epithecium (the uppermost layer of the hymenium) shows a red-violet reaction with K and C. The margin of the apothecia occasionally produces a red reaction with K, though this is rare. The secondary metabolites (lichen products) in P. rupicola include thiophaninic acid, stictic acid, norstictic acid, cryptostictic acid, and variably present compounds such as menegazziaic acid (±) and atranorin (±).

== Habitat and distribution ==
Pertusaria rupicola has a Mediterranean distribution. It is saxicolous (growing on rock surfaces), particularly on steep siliceous north-facing rock faces. It grows best in bright, well-lit environments but prefers indirect light rather than direct, intense sunlight. Documented countries that the lichen has been collected in include Spain, France, Bulgaria, and it is especially abundant on rocky outcrops in the Empordà region, such as in the Albera Massif, Serra de Verdera, and Cap de Creus peninsula, where it forms visually distinctive, greenish-yellow patches within saxicolous lichen communities. Although previously widespread and conspicuous, these lichen communities suffered severe declines following wildfires in 1986 and 2000, primarily due to intense heat damage rather than direct flame contact. Reestablishment of these lichens is slow, constrained by their very gradual growth rate and scarcity of nearby living propagules.

== Species interactions ==
Pertusaria rupicola is a known host species to the lichenicolous (lichen-dwelling) fungus species Lichenostigma rupicolae.

== See also ==
- List of Pertusaria species
