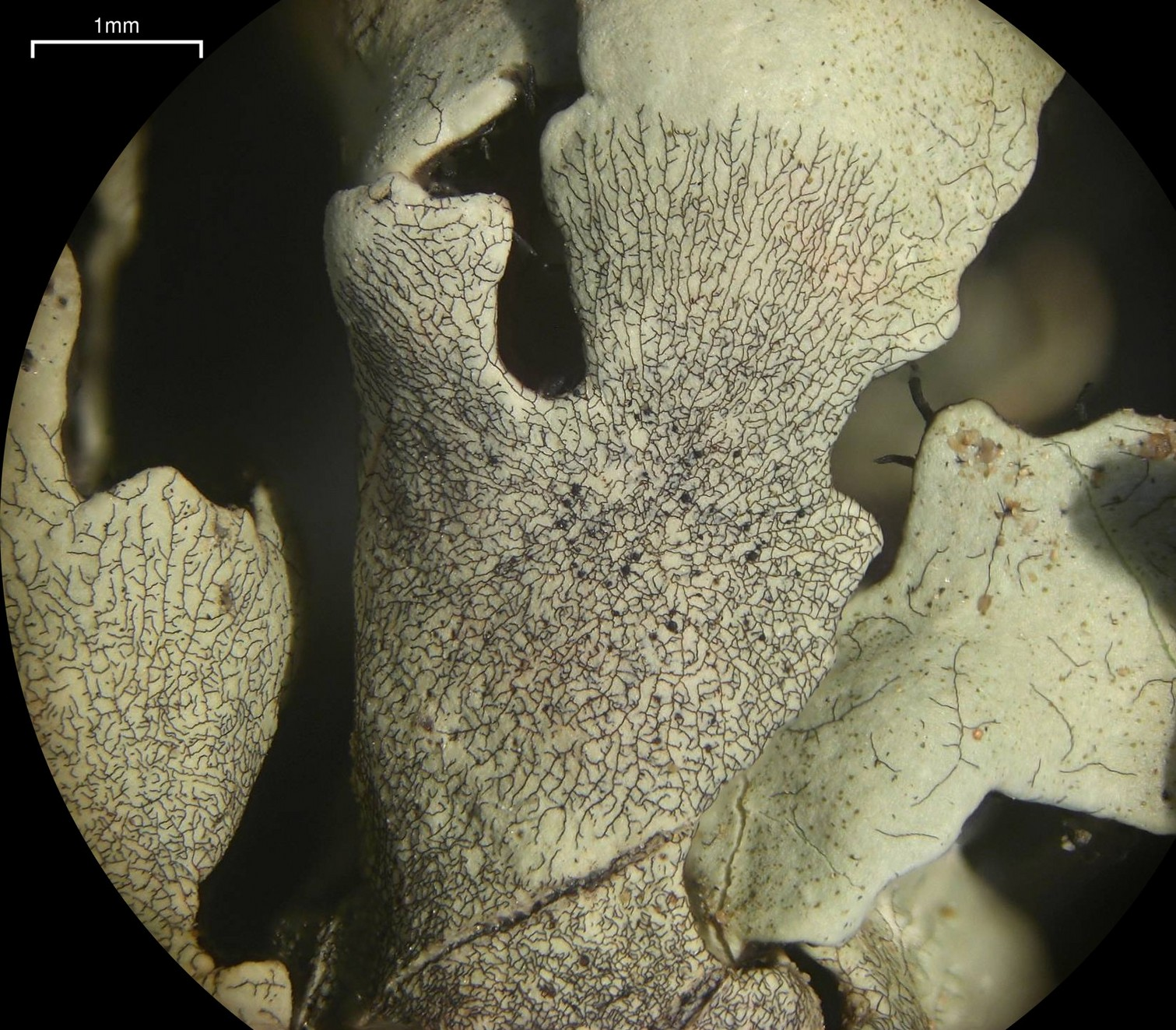
- Lichenostigma cosmopolites growing on the lichen Xanthoparmelia somloensis

Scientific classification
- Kingdom: Fungi
- Division: Ascomycota
- Class: Arthoniomycetes
- Order: Lichenostigmatales
- Family: Phaeococcomycetaceae
- Genus: Lichenostigma
- Species: L. cosmopolites

Binomial name
- Lichenostigma cosmopolites Hafellner & Calat. (1999)

= Lichenostigma cosmopolites =

Species of fungus

Lichenostigma cosmopolites is a species of lichenicolous (lichen-dwelling) fungus belonging to the family Phaeococcomycetaceae. It was first described in 1999 from Spain and has since been found on multiple continents wherever its Xanthoparmelia hosts occur. The fungus appears as dark, net-like patches on the surface of infected lichens but does not seem to seriously harm its hosts.

== Taxonomy ==
The fungus was described as new to science in 1999 by the lichenologists Josef Hafellner and Vicent Calatayud. The type specimen was collected by Calatayud from Serra Calderona in Spain, at an elevation of 350 m, where it was found growing on Xanthoparmelia tinctina.

== Description ==
Lichenostigma cosmopolites is a lichen-dwelling (lichenicolous) fungus that parasitises members of the widespread foliose lichen genus Xanthoparmelia. On an infected thallus it appears as a dark, net-like film of single-stranded, septate hyphae that lie largely on the surface of the host rather than penetrating its tissues. These filaments are dark brown, sparsely branched and measure 6–10 μm long by 4–7 μm wide; occasional slight constrictions at the cross-walls (septa) give them a beaded look.

Reproduction takes place in minute, almost spherical fruit-bodies (ascomata) scattered across the hyphal network. Each ascoma is 60–100 μm wide and 30–45 μm high, dark brown to black, and opens to the outside through a small, irregular pore. Inside, broadly club-shaped asci (15–20 × 12–15 μm) develop in a single layer; each ascus contains eight ascospores. The ascospores are initially oval but mature to become almost spherical, 8–11 μm long by 3–5 μm wide, and acquire a fine, sculptured outer wall as the originally conspicuous perispore contracts. When treated with potassium hydroxide solution followed by iodine, the ascus apex turns blue and the gelatinous interior of the ascoma shows an orange-red reaction—tests that aid in distinguishing the species.

== Habitat and distribution ==
The fungus is known from multiple continents wherever suitable Xanthoparmelia hosts occur, a distribution reflected in its epithet cosmopolites. Infections typically form soot-grey flecks on the lichen surface but do not appear to compromise the host's vitality. The fungus grows parasitically on Xanthoparmelia lichens. In India it has been reported from the thallus of Xanthoparmelia stenophylla.
