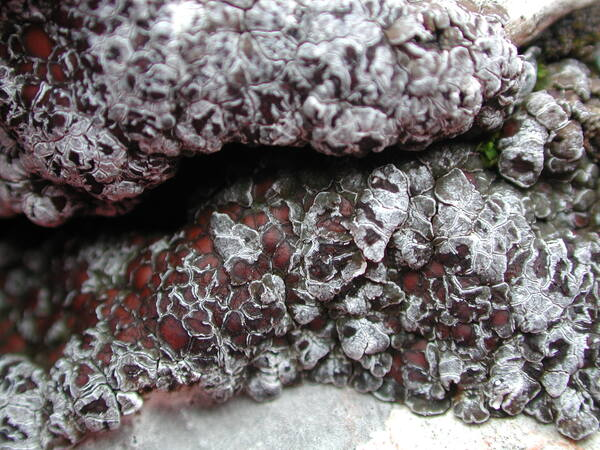

Scientific classification
- Kingdom: Fungi
- Division: Ascomycota
- Class: Lecanoromycetes
- Order: Acarosporales
- Family: Acarosporaceae
- Genus: Acarospora
- Species: A. cervina

Binomial name
- Acarospora cervina A.Massal

= Acarospora cervina =

Species of lichen

Acarospora cervina is a species of lichen in the Acarosporaceae family that may be referred to as reindeer lichen. It is sometimes considered Acarospora glaucocarpa var. cervina.

== Description ==
Acarospora cervina has a thallus with many rounded areoles (3 mm diameter) of a green-grey to dark brown colour. The areoles create a rather thick lobulated crust, and therefore the surface is smooth or slightly roughened, matt, and partly to completely blue-grey hairy. The ascus contains more than 100 spores. The photobiont layer is irregular and uneven.

== Distribution and habitat ==
It grows on natural limestone at low elevations, but may occur on calcareous soil. It is a calciphyte found frequently in the Czech Republic, although it also occurs in Asia, south parts of Australia, Europe and North Africa, as well as Greenland. It is listed on the North American checklist, but there is no evidence of it being found there, and may have been mistaken for Sarcogyne canadensis. It covers areas of up to 10 cm.
