= Daegwallyeong-myeon =

- Township
- Location of Daegwallyeong-myeon in South Korea
- Coordinates: 37°40′00″N 128°42′00″E
- Country: Republic of Korea
- Province: Gangwon Province
- County: Pyeongchang
- Administrative divisions: 21 ri

Area
  - Total: 221.6 km^{2} (85.6 sq mi)
- Elevation: 750 m (2,460 ft)

Population (2008)
  - Total: 6,162
- Time zone: UTC+9 (Korea Standard Time)

Korean name
- Hangul: 대관령면
- Hanja: 大關嶺面
- RR: Daegwallyeong-myeon
- MR: Taegwallyŏng-myŏn

Daegwallyeong-myeon (Korean: 대관령면) is a myeon (township) in Pyeongchang County, Gangwon Province, South Korea. It is located in the northeastern part of the county. The total area of Daegwallyeong-myeon is 221.63 square kilometers (85.57 sq mi), and, as of 2008, the population was 6,162 people. The myeon was named Doam-myeon (Korean: 도암면; Hanja: 道岩面) until 2007. Daegwallyeong-myeon is named after the important mountain pass of Daegwallyeong. It has the coldest average temperature in South Korea.

== Climate ==
Climate data for Daegwallyeong, Pyeongchang (1991–2020 normals, extremes 1971–present)
Month	Jan	Feb	Mar	Apr	May	Jun	Jul	Aug	Sep	Oct	Nov	Dec	Year
Record high °C (°F)	9.3 (48.7)	16.5 (61.7)	20.5 (68.9)	30.1 (86.2)	31.0 (87.8)	32.3 (90.1)	32.9 (91.2)	32.7 (90.9)	29.0 (84.2)	26.1 (79.0)	21.5 (70.7)	13.5 (56.3)	32.9 (91.2)
Mean daily maximum °C (°F)	−1.8 (28.8)	0.6 (33.1)	5.5 (41.9)	12.9 (55.2)	18.4 (65.1)	21.3 (70.3)	23.4 (74.1)	23.6 (74.5)	19.4 (66.9)	14.6 (58.3)	7.5 (45.5)	0.5 (32.9)	12.2 (54.0)
Daily mean °C (°F)	−7.0 (19.4)	−4.6 (23.7)	0.4 (32.7)	7.0 (44.6)	12.5 (54.5)	16.2 (61.2)	19.6 (67.3)	19.7 (67.5)	14.6 (58.3)	8.8 (47.8)	2.3 (36.1)	−4.5 (23.9)	7.1 (44.8)
Mean daily minimum °C (°F)	−12.2 (10.0)	−10.1 (13.8)	−4.7 (23.5)	1.2 (34.2)	6.8 (44.2)	11.6 (52.9)	16.6 (61.9)	16.5 (61.7)	10.4 (50.7)	3.5 (38.3)	−2.6 (27.3)	−9.4 (15.1)	2.3 (36.1)
Record low °C (°F)	−28.9 (−20.0)	−27.6 (−17.7)	−23.0 (−9.4)	−14.6 (5.7)	−4.7 (23.5)	−1.7 (28.9)	4.4 (39.9)	3.3 (37.9)	−2.3 (27.9)	−9.9 (14.2)	−18.7 (−1.7)	−24.7 (−12.5)	−28.9 (−20.0)
Average precipitation mm (inches)	53.1 (2.09)	49.2 (1.94)	72.6 (2.86)	93.5 (3.68)	108.2 (4.26)	162.5 (6.40)	336.3 (13.24)	368.4 (14.50)	249.6 (9.83)	97.6 (3.84)	69.4 (2.73)	34.7 (1.37)	1,695.1 (66.74)
Average precipitation days (≥ 0.1 mm)	9.4	8.9	11.2	10.4	10.8	12.9	17.8	18.1	13.1	8.9	10.2	8.5	140.2
Average snowy days	13.0	11.8	12.0	3.3	0.2	0.0	0.0	0.0	0.0	0.8	5.2	10.9	57.2
Average relative humidity (%)	66.3	65.7	65.8	61.9	67.5	79.4	86.2	87.2	85.5	76.8	70.3	66.6	73.3
Mean monthly sunshine hours	199.3	193.5	210.9	223.1	237.2	192.4	143.0	138.2	149.6	196.2	177.2	193.3	2,253.9
Percentage possible sunshine	64.4	60.8	54.6	57.4	52.1	40.7	30.8	31.0	38.6	55.5	57.8	64.3	49.3
Source: Korea Meteorological Administration (snow and percent sunshine 1981–2010)

== Attractions ==
- Yongpyong Ski Resort: largest ski resort in South Korea, venue of 2018 Winter Olympics
- Alpensia Resort: main venue of 2018 Winter Olympics
- Daegwallyeong Sheep Farm
- Pyeongchang Olympic Stadium: venue for the opening and closing ceremonies of the 2018 Winter Olympics
