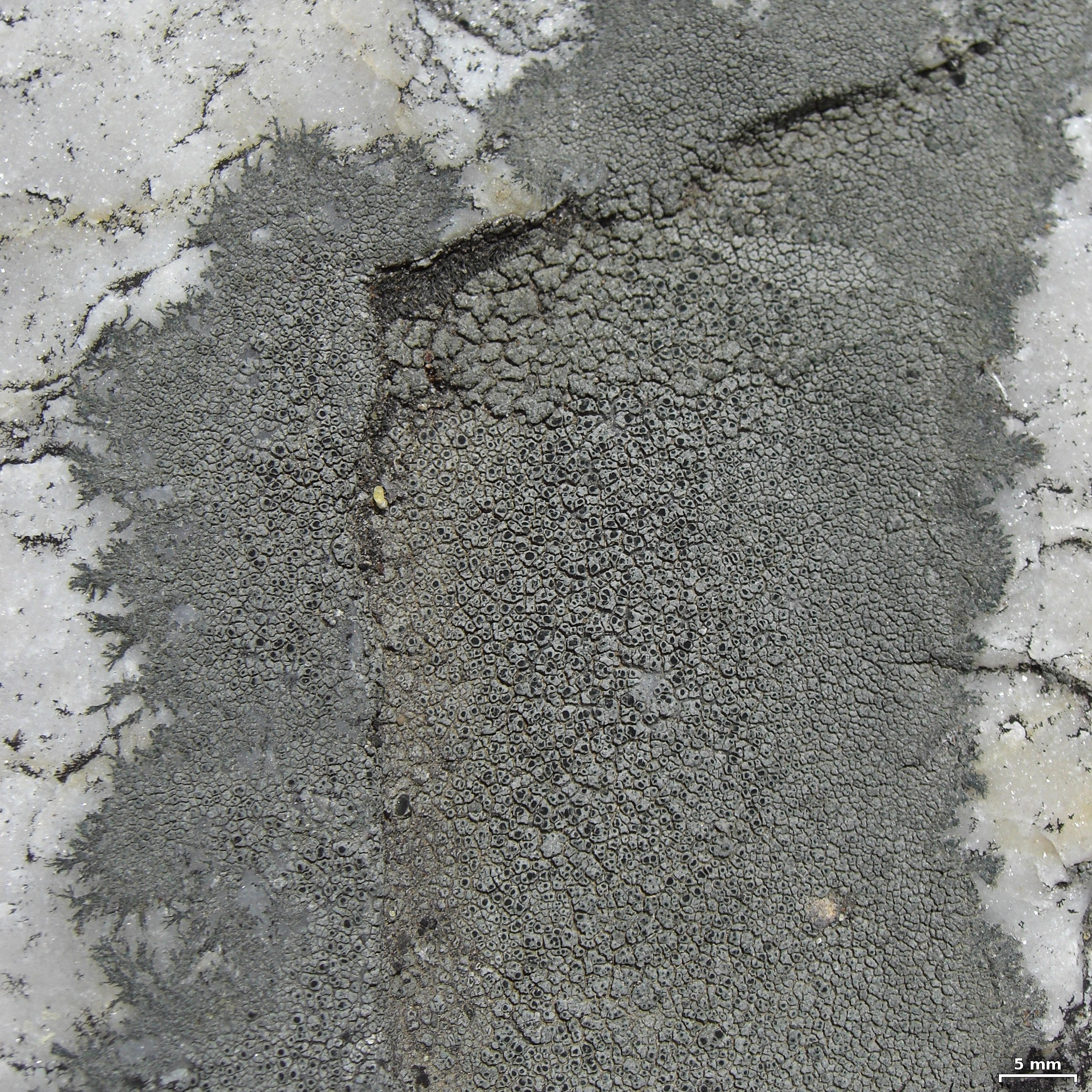
- Aspicilia confusa Meadow Lake, Lemhi Mountains, Idaho

Scientific classification
- Kingdom: Fungi
- Division: Ascomycota
- Class: Lecanoromycetes
- Order: Pertusariales
- Family: Megasporaceae
- Genus: Aspicilia
- Species: A. confusa

Binomial name
- Aspicilia confusa Owe-Larss. & A. Nordin

= Aspicilia confusa =

Species of lichen

Aspicilia confusa is a pale gray (sometimes brownish) crustose areolate lichen that grows mostly on rock in southern and central California mountains, from 250 to 3,170 metres (820 to 10,400 ft). Areoles may be contiguous or dispersed. It has a dark, fringed prothallus. Each areole commonly has 1–4 round to angular aspicilioid apothecia that are 0.1–1.5 mm in diameter, sunken into it. Each apothecia has a usually concave, black disc. Lichen spot tests are all negative. It grows on rock in chaparral or forests in central and southern California, including the Sierra Nevadas, but not in the southeastern deserts of California.
