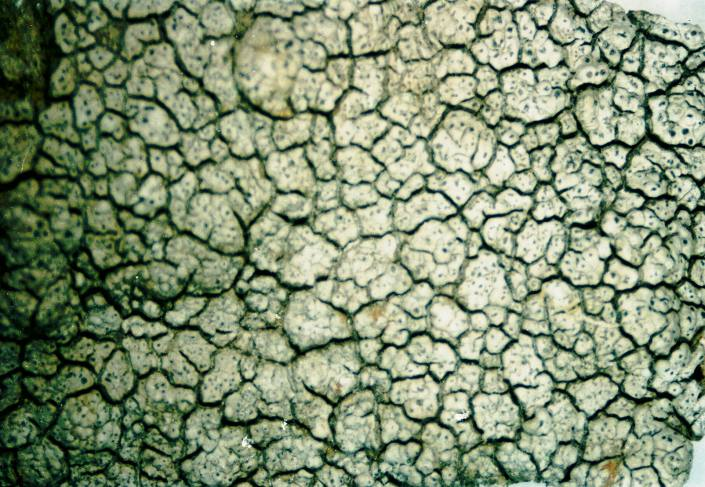
- Aspicilia cinerea

Scientific classification
- Kingdom: Fungi
- Division: Ascomycota
- Class: Lecanoromycetes
- Order: Pertusariales
- Family: Megasporaceae
- Genus: Aspicilia; A.Massal. (1852)

Type species
- Aspicilia cinerea (L.) Körb. (1855)

= Aspicilia =

Genus of lichen-forming fungi

Aspicilia (sunken disk lichen) is a genus of mostly crustose areolate lichens that grow on rock. Most members have black apothecia discs that are slightly immersed in the areolas, hence the common name"Given the same reason, the naming of Aspicilia is derived from the Greek word for "shield concave".

Most of the species of this genus grow on calcareous and acidic rocks and most of the taxa prefer temperate and arctic habitats.

Some members of the genus Aspicilia are pioneer species on granite and other hard rock, after which members of other lichen species may grow on them, such as members of Acarospora.

== Description ==
Members of this genus are weakly cracked to distinctly areolate, with a scattered to whole thalli. Some of the species of this genus are disc-shaped with plicate lobes at the circumference; these lobes may appear chalky white, grayish, greenish or brownish. Some possess vegetative means of propagation such as isidia (column-like structures of fungal and algal cells normally found on the top-side or outer cortex of the lichen) and soredia (structures that produce soralia, granule-like masses of intertwined fungal and algal cells occurring on top of the cortex and on the margins).

They have characteristic ascomata which are mostly immersed but occasionally emergent. They have 4 to 8 spored asci that are cylindrical to club-shaped. Their ascospores are typically ellipsoid to globose in shape, colorless and thin-walled. They often contain β-orcinol depsidones (secondary metabolites of lichens) such as norstictic acid and stictic acids; others have fatty acids or triterpenes. In genus Aspicilia dramatic changes in growth forms are very common, and some taxa may display extreme transitions within the same population or even changes within the same thallus.

== Classification ==
Previously placed in the family Hymeneliaceae, phylogenetic analyses indicate that the genus is better placed in the family Megasporaceae.

== Species ==
As of October 2021, Species Fungorum accepts 70 species of Aspicilia.

- Aspicilia abbasiana S.Y.Kondr., Lőkös, Ismayil & S.Y.Guo (2016)
- Aspicilia albosparsa (Werner) S.Y.Kondr. (2002)
- Aspicilia angelica Owe-Larss. & A.Nordin (2007)
- Aspicilia aquatica (Fr.) Körb. (1855)
- Aspicilia arizonica Owe-Larss. & A.Nordin (2007)
- Aspicilia armeniaca (Werner) S.Y.Kondr. (2002)
- Aspicilia aurantiaca Owe-Larss. & A.Nordin (2007)
- Aspicilia auricularis (Werner) S.Y.Kondr. (2002)
- Aspicilia berntii A.Nordin, Tibell & Owe-Larss. (2008)
- Aspicilia bicensis F.Anderson & Lendemer (2016)
- Aspicilia blastidiata Paukov, A.Nordin & Tibell (2015)
- Aspicilia boykinii Owe-Larss. & A.Nordin (2007)
- Aspicilia californica Rosentr. (1998
- Aspicilia candida (Anzi) Hue (1912)
- Aspicilia cinerea (L.) Körb. (1855)
- Aspicilia confusa Owe-Larss. & A.Nordin (2007)
- Aspicilia corallophora (Poelt) Hafellner & Türk (2001)
- Aspicilia cuprea Owe-Larss. & A. Nordin (2007)
- Aspicilia cyanescens Owe-Larss. & A. Nordin (2007)
- Aspicilia desertorum (Kremp.) Mereschk. (1911)
- Aspicilia dubertretii (Werner) S.Y.Kondr. (2002)
- Aspicilia endochlora (Hook. f. & Taylor) C.W.Dodge (1948)
- Aspicilia epiglypta (Norrl. ex Nyl.) Hue (1912)
- Aspicilia euphratica (Werner) S.Y.Kondr. (2002)
- Aspicilia expansa (Lynge) Alstrup & E.S.Hansen (2001)
- Aspicilia fluviatilis A.Nordin & Owe-Larss. (2010)
- Aspicilia fruticulosofoliacea (Elenkin) Sohrabi (2010)
- Aspicilia fumosa Owe-Larss. & A.Nordin (2007)
- Aspicilia granulosa A.Nordin (2010)
- Aspicilia grisea Arnold (1891)
- Aspicilia guadalupensis Owe-Larss. & A.Nordin (2007)
- Aspicilia humida Lee (2022) – South Korea
- Aspicilia indeterminata T.B.Wheeler (2024) – U.S.
- Aspicilia knudsenii Owe-Larss. & A.Nordin (2007)
- Aspicilia laevata (Ach.) Arnold (1887)
- Aspicilia major (Lynge) Øvstedal (2009) – Falkland Islands
- Aspicilia nashii Owe-Larss. & A.Nordin (2007)
- Aspicilia niesenensis (H.Magn.) Hafellner (2018)
- Aspicilia ochromelaena (Zahlbr.) J.C.Wei (1991)
- Aspicilia olivaceobrunnea Owe-Larss. & A.Nordin (2007)
- Aspicilia olivaceopallida (H.Magn.) Lendemer (2013)
- Aspicilia pacifica Owe-Larss. & A.Nordin (2007)
- Aspicilia peltastictoides (Hasse) K.Knudsen & Kocourk. (2013)
- Aspicilia persica (Müll.Arg.) Sohrabi (2008)
- Aspicilia phaea Owe-Larss. & A.Nordin (2007)
- Aspicilia prestensis Cl.Roux & A.Nordin (2011)
- Aspicilia pseudoabbasiana S.Y.Kondr., Lőkös & Hur (2016)
- Aspicilia pseudovulcanica S.Y.Kondr., Lőkös & Hur (2016)
- Aspicilia punctiformis (Lynge) Øvstedal (2009)
- Aspicilia reagens (Zahlbr.) Cl.Roux & M.Bertrand (2016)
- Aspicilia santamonicae Owe-Larss. & A.Nordin (2007)
- Aspicilia serpentinicola Suza ex A.Nordin (2013)
- Aspicilia sipeana (H. Magn.) Owe-Larss. & A.Nordin (2007)
- Aspicilia stalagmitica Paukov & Davydov (2020)
- Aspicilia straussii (J.Steiner) Sohrabi (2008)
- Aspicilia suavis T.B.Wheeler (2024) – U.S.
- Aspicilia subcaesia J.C.Wei (1991)
- Aspicilia subdepressa Arnold (1869)
- Aspicilia subepiglypta S.Y.Kondr., Lőkös & Hur (2016)
- Aspicilia subfarinosa (J.Steiner) Şenkard. & Sohrabi (2011)
- Aspicilia subgeographica S.Y.Kondr., Lőkös & Hur (2016)
- Aspicilia subgoettweigensis S.Y.Kondr., Lőkös & Hur (2016)
- Aspicilia submamillata S.Y.Kondr., Lőkös & Hur (2016)
- Aspicilia substerilis Sipman (2007)
- Aspicilia substictica Owe-Larss. & A.Nordin (2007)
- Aspicilia taurica (Mereschk.) Hafellner (2004)
- Aspicilia tuberculosa (Ach.) J.R.Laundon (1986)
- Aspicilia verrucigera Hue (1912)

== Gallery ==
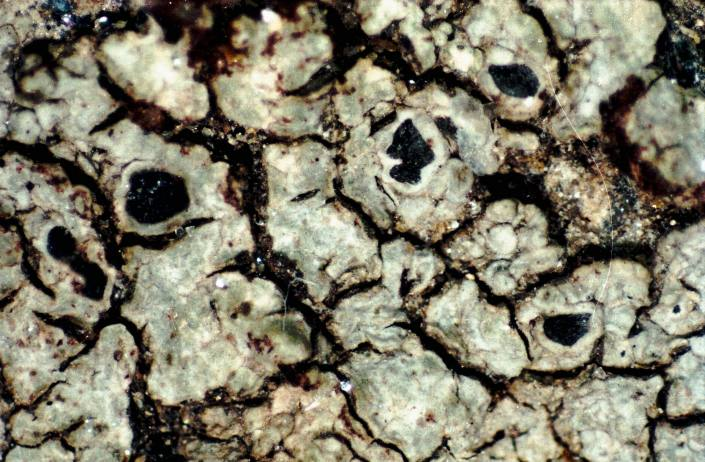
Aspicilia caesiocinerea

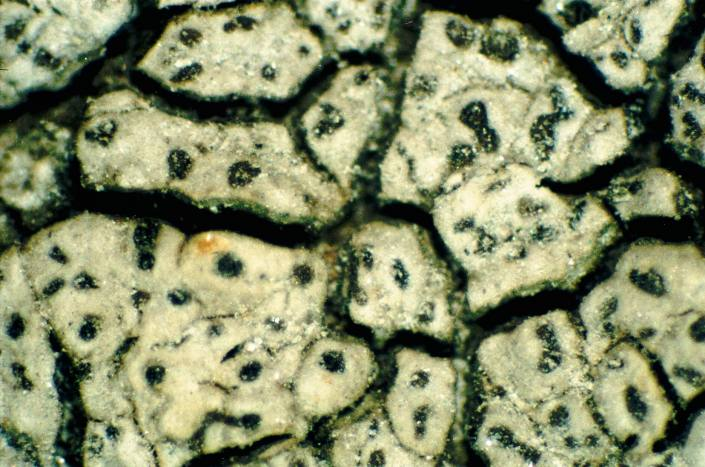
Aspicilia cinerea

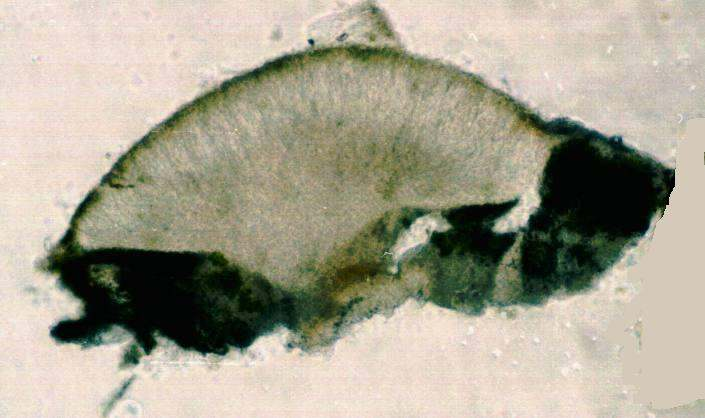
Photograph of a cross section of an apothecium of A. caesiocinerea taken through a compound microscope, x 100. Note the dark olive epihymenium.

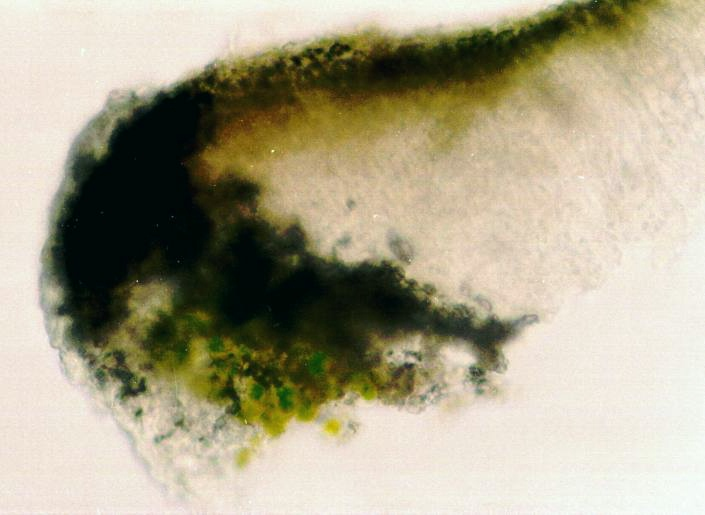
Photograph of a section of an apothecium of A. cinerea taken through a compound microscope (x400) showing algae in the amphithecium of the thalline margin. (Lecanorine-type apothecium)

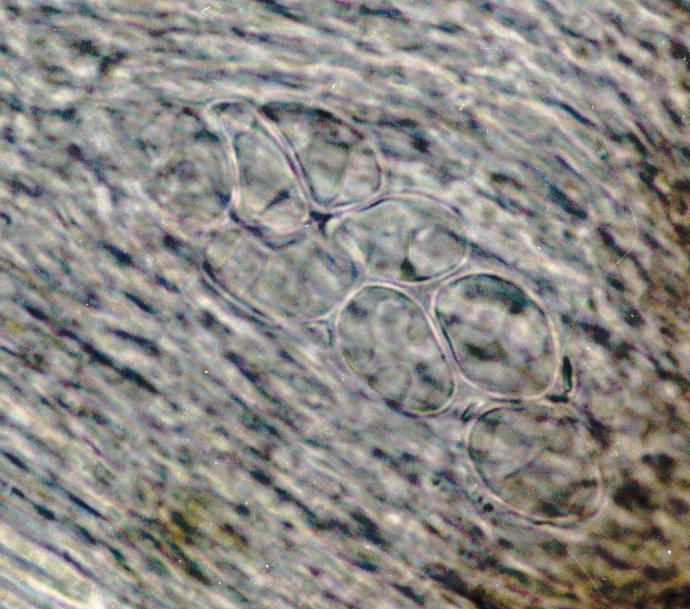
Photograph of an ascus from A. caesiocinerea taken through a compound microscope (x1000) showing 8 spores per ascus. (Spores measure approximately 15 x 11 micrometres.)
