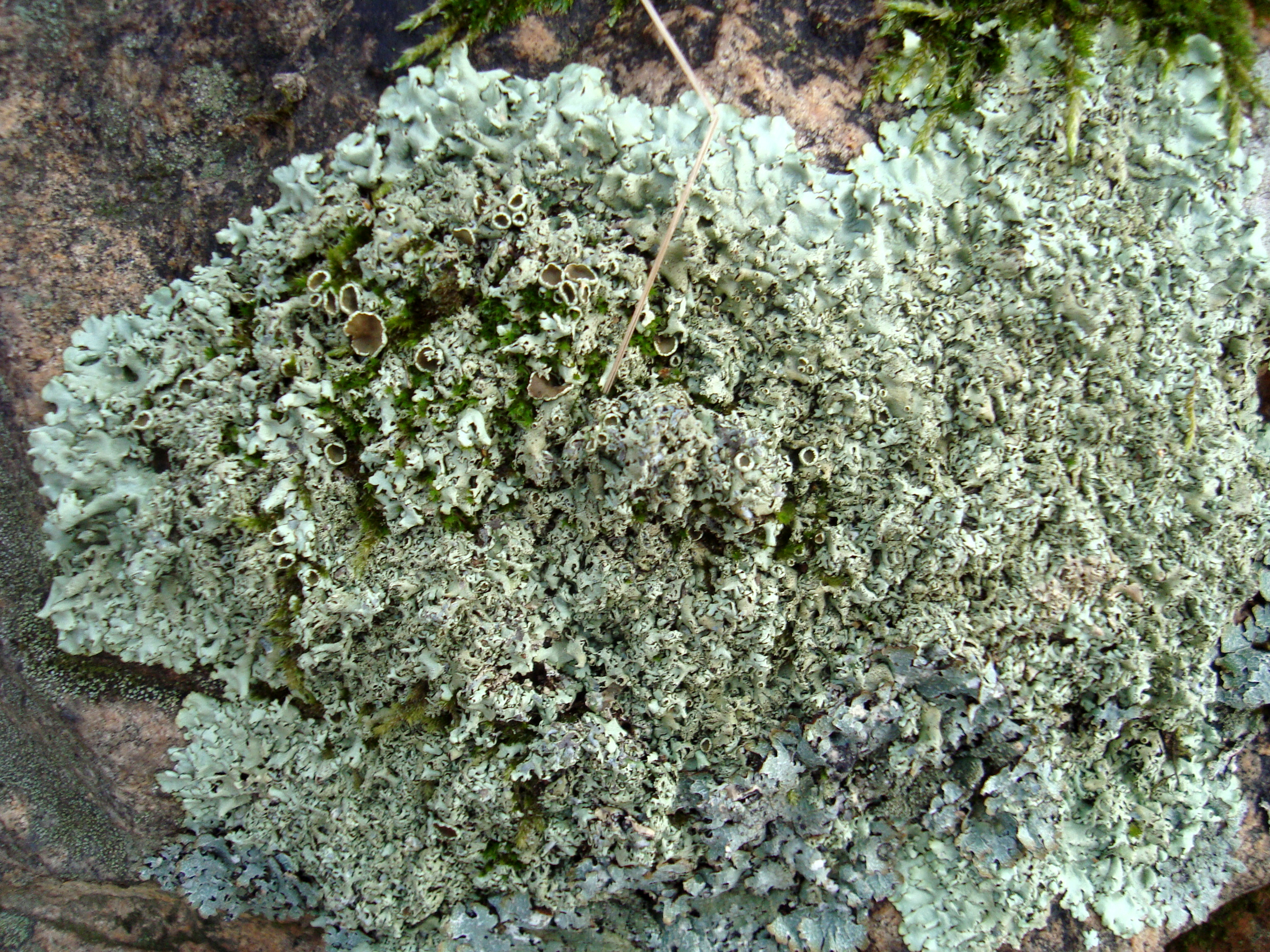

Conservation status
- Secure (NatureServe)

Scientific classification
- Kingdom: Fungi
- Division: Ascomycota
- Class: Lecanoromycetes
- Order: Lecanorales
- Family: Parmeliaceae
- Genus: Xanthoparmelia
- Species: X. stenophylla

Binomial name
- Xanthoparmelia stenophylla (Ach.) Ahti & D.Hawksw. (2005)

Synonyms
- Parmelia conspersa var. stenophylla Ach. (1803)

= Xanthoparmelia stenophylla =

Species of lichen

Xanthoparmelia stenophylla is a species of foliose lichen in the family Parmeliaceae.

== Taxonomy ==
Xanthoparmelia stenophylla was first described by Erik Acharius in 1803 as Parmelia conspersa var. stenophylla, based on specimens collected in Sweden. The species was later elevated to species rank as Parmelia stenophylla by C.A. Heugel in 1855. For many years, the species was known under various names including Parmelia somloënsis, which was widely used following Mason Hale's 1990 monograph of Xanthoparmelia. However, detailed nomenclatural research by Teuvo Ahti and David Hawksworth in 2005 established that stenophylla is the correct and earliest legitimate epithet for this species.

The lectotype specimen of X. stenophylla, preserved in the Acharius Herbarium (H-ACH 1347A), is characterised by narrow lobes and lacks isidia. Both the lectotype and isolectotype specimens host the lichenicolous fungus Lichenostigma cosmopolites, which is commonly found on Xanthoparmelia species.

A homonymous species, Parmelia stenophylla Müll.Arg., was described in 1894 from Costa Rica but this name was later determined to be illegitimate as it represented a different taxon, likely belonging to the genus Bulbothrix. This taxonomic confusion, combined with varying interpretations of nomenclatural rules, contributed to the historical use of multiple names for this widespread lichen species before its current classification as Xanthoparmelia stenophylla was established.

== Ecology ==
Xanthoparmelia stenophylla contains usnic acid which gives its upper cortex a yellowish appearance, though its colouration can vary significantly based on environmental conditions. Studies have shown that when exposed to ultraviolet radiation (UVR), the species develops a distinctive dull blue cortical pigment that functions as a protective screen against photoinhibition in well-lit habitats. This UVR-induced blue pigmentation, which has been observed to develop within 21 days of exposure, is insoluble in acetone and resembles melanin compounds found in other lichens. The ability to produce this protective pigment may contribute to the success of X. stenophylla in sun-exposed habitats. When shielded from UVR, the lichen maintains its typical pale-green colouration.

It is a known host species to the lichenicolous fungus Lichenostigma cosmopolites.

== See also ==
- List of Xanthoparmelia species
