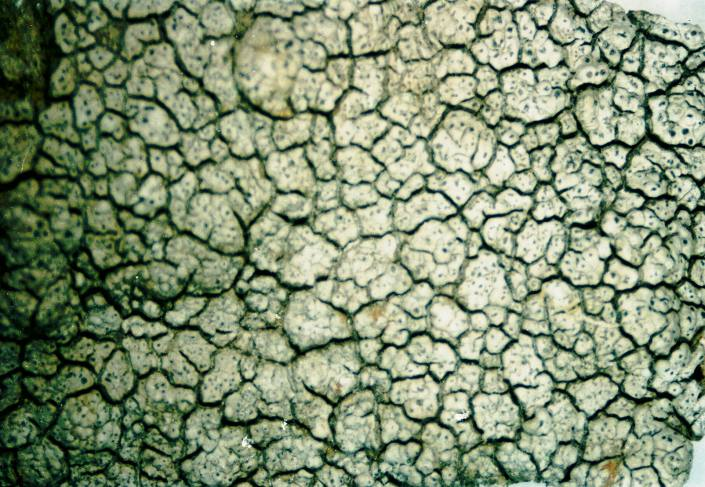
- Aspicilia cinerea

Conservation status
- Secure (NatureServe)

Scientific classification
- Kingdom: Fungi
- Division: Ascomycota
- Class: Lecanoromycetes
- Order: Pertusariales
- Family: Megasporaceae
- Genus: Aspicilia
- Species: A. cinerea

Binomial name
- Aspicilia cinerea (L.) Körb. (1855)

Synonyms
- Lichen cinereus L. (1767)

= Aspicilia cinerea =

Species of lichen-forming fungus

Aspicilia cinerea (cinder lichen) is a gray to almost white, 1.5–15 cm (0.59–5.91 in) wide, crustose areolate lichen with large apothecia that mostly grows on rock in the mountains. It grows in variable forms, from having a continuous surface to being areolate. It grows in Eurasia, and North America on siliceous rock, schist or igneous rock in habitats exposed to sunlight, also rarely on calciferous rock. It is common in Arizona, and rare in California and Baja California at elevations of 1,700 to 3,300 metres (5,600 to 10,800 ft). In Nepal, Aspicilia cinerea has been reported at 4,300 m (14,100 ft) elevation in a compilation of published records.

Flat to almost convex areoles are angular to irregular, and 0.2–2 mm in diameter. They are contiguous but clearly separated by well defined cracks. It usually lacks a prothallus. It may be rimose toward the outer edges. Each areole has 1–10, round to angular or irregular, 0.1–1.6 mm apothecia that may be confluent when numerous. Apothecia have usually black concave discs, with exciple margins of thallus tissue. Asci are club shaped (clavate), with 8 ellipsoid ascospores.

Lichen spot tests on the cortex and medulla are K+ red, KC−, P+ yellow or P+ orange, with the medulla sometimes testing K+ yellow and P+ orange. Secondary metabolites include norstictic acid and often connorstictic acid in traces, and more rarely hyposalazinic acid.

The photobiont is a chlorococcoid green alga.

== See also ==
- List of lichens named by Carl Linnaeus
