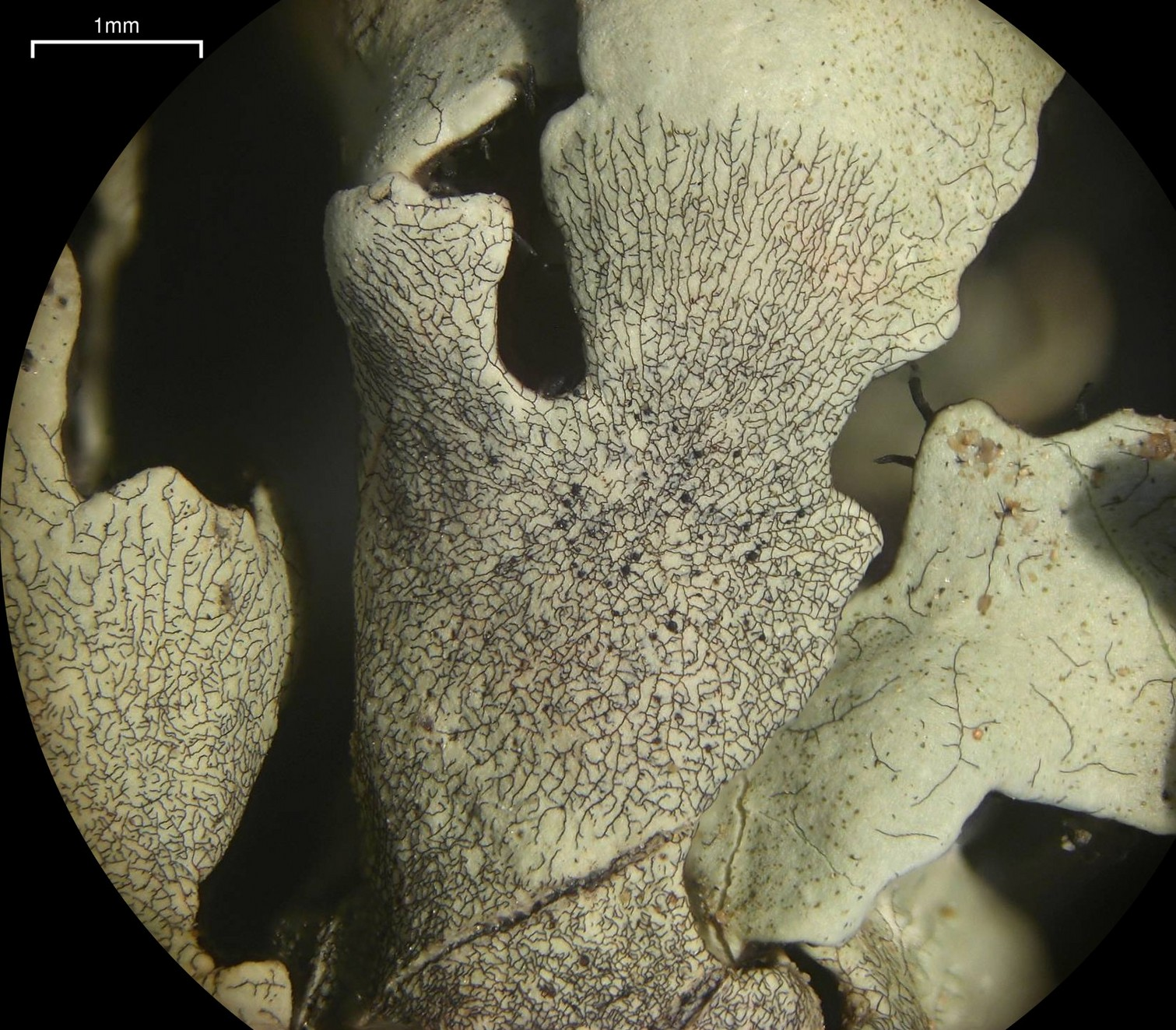
- Lichenostigma cosmopolites growing parasitically on the thallus of the foliose lichen Xanthoparmelia stenophylla

Scientific classification
- Kingdom: Fungi
- Division: Ascomycota
- Class: Arthoniomycetes
- Order: Lichenostigmatales; Ertz, Diederich & Lawrey (2014)

Type genus
- Lichenostigma Hafellner (1983)

Family & genera
- Phaeococcomycetaceae Antarctolichenia Etayoa Lichenostigma Phaeococcomyces

= Lichenostigmatales =

Order of fungi

Lichenostigmatales is an order of fungi in the class Arthoniomycetes. It contains the single family Phaeococcomycetaceae. Lichenostigmatales was circumscribed in 2014 by Damien Ertz, Paul Diederich, and James D. Lawrey, with genus Lichenostigma assigned as the type. Using molecular phylogenetics, they identified a lineage of taxa in the Arthoniomycetes that were phylogenetically distinct from the order Arthoniales. Species in the Lichenostigmatales include black yeasts, lichenicolous, and melanised rock-inhabiting species.

Recent estimates for the number of taxa in the family Phaeococcomycetaceae suggest that it contains 3 genera (Etayoa, Lichenostigma, and Phaeococcomyces) and either 31 or 37 species. The monotypic genus Antarctolichenia was added to Phaeococcomycetaceae in 2021.
