= Rimose =

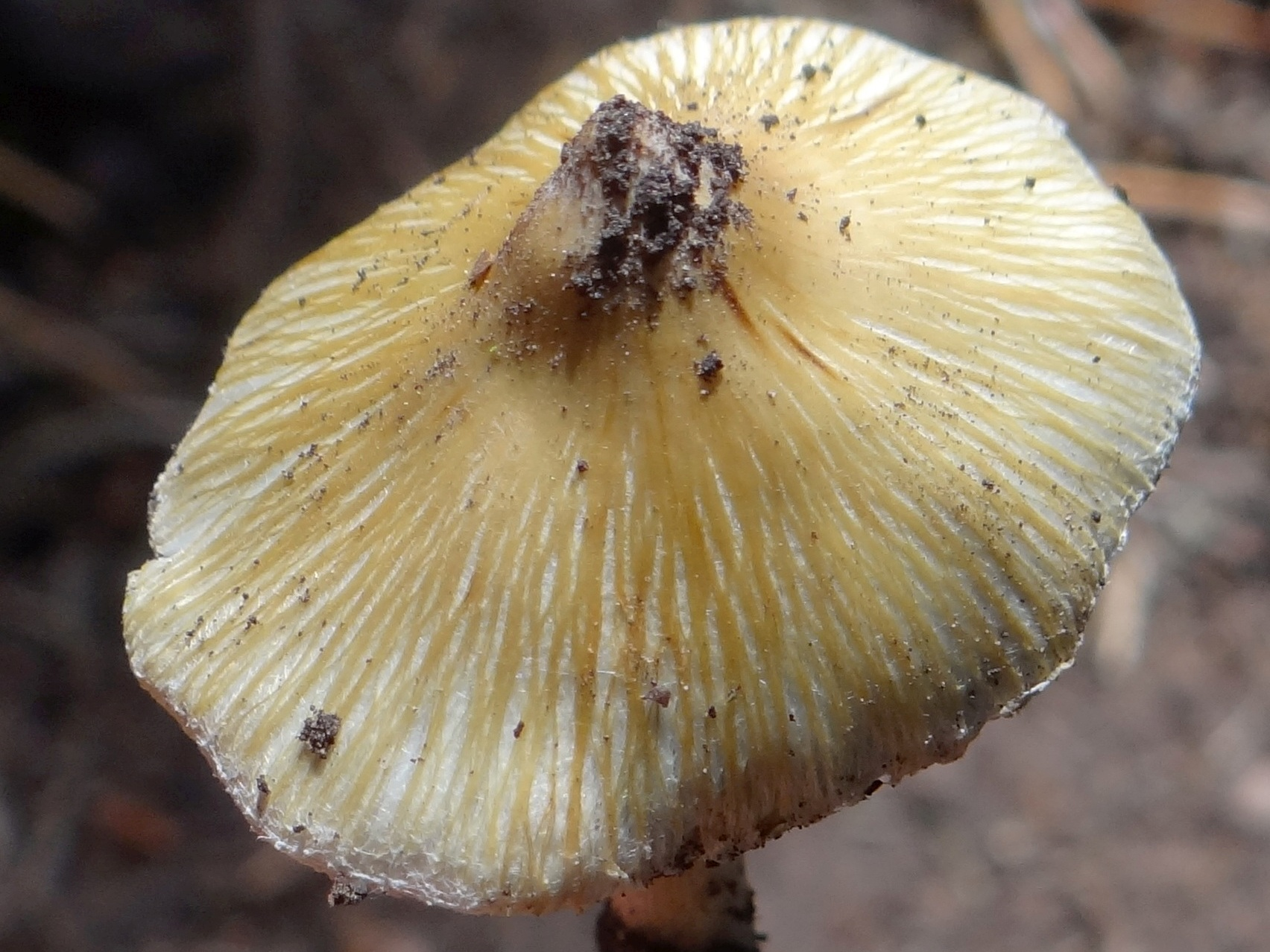
Rimose mushroom (Inosperma rimosum)

Rimose is an adjective used to describe a surface that is cracked or fissured.

The term is often used in describing crustose lichens. A rimose surface of a lichen is sometimes contrasted to the surface being areolate. Areolate is an extreme form of being rimose, where the cracks or fissures are so deep that they create island-like pieces called areoles, which look the "islands" of mud on the surface of a dry lake bed. Rimose and areolate are contrasted with being verrucose, or "warty". Verrucose surfaces have warty bumps which are distinct, but not separated by cracks.

In mycology the term describes mushrooms whose caps crack in a radial pattern, as commonly found in the genera Inocybe and Inosperma.
