= Rhizoplaca occulta =

Scientific classification
- Kingdom: Fungi
- Division: Ascomycota
- Class: Lecanoromycetes
- Order: Lecanorales
- Family: Lecanoraceae
- Genus: Rhizoplaca
- Species: R. occulta

Binomial name
- Rhizoplaca occulta S.D.Leav., Fern.-Mend., Lumbsch, Sohrabi & St.Clair (2013)

Species of lichen

Rhizoplaca occulta is a species of crustose lichen in the family Lecanoraceae. The species was described in 2013 after DNA analysis revealed it had long been hidden within the broadly defined species complex based around the widespread Rhizoplaca melanophthalma. Rhizoplaca occulta is a highly variable lichen can form either tightly attached, radiating growths with dark centers or loose, unattached cushions that roll freely on the ground. It is known only from high-elevation sites in Nevada, Idaho, and Utah, where it grows on exposed, calcium-poor rocks, though reliable identification typically requires both chemical analysis and DNA confirmation due to its variable appearance.

== Taxonomy ==
Rhizoplaca occulta was described in 2013 by Steven Leavitt, Félix Fernández-Mendoza, H. Thorsten Lumbsch, Mohammad Sohrabi, and Larry St. Clair. The authors placed it in Rhizoplaca after multilocus DNA analyses recovered a strongly supported clade ("IVa") that is genealogically distinct from every other member of the R. melanophthalma species complex; the lineage had strong statistical support in the phylogenetic analysis. The epithet occulta, Latin for 'hidden', refers to the fact that the new species had long been concealed within the broadly defined R. melanophthalma sensu lato.

Phylogenetically, R. occulta sits in a well-supported cluster with R. parilis, R. polymorpha, R. porteri, and the obligately unattached (vagrant) species R. haydenii and R. idahoensis. Internal transcribed spacer (ITS) sequences among the known specimens differ by only about 0.3%, emphasizing the genetic cohesion of the taxon.

== Description ==
This is a morphologically variable crustose to placodioid lichen. Many thalli resemble typical R. melanophthalma with tightly attached, radiating lobes and a dark central disk, while others form loose, unattached cushions—so-called "vagrant" morphs—that roll about the substrate; the latter include material previously labeled Rhizoplaca cerebriformis and R. subidahoensis. Because both attached and vagrant forms share the same DNA signature, they are treated as a single polymorphic species.

Chemically the lichen is dominated by usnic acid, which imparts a yellow-green tint to the surface. It usually contains psoromic acid as a second major metabolite, together with minor amounts of constipatic, dehydroconstipatic, 2'-O-demethylpsoromic, and 2'-O-demethylsubpsoromic acids; dehydroprotocetraric acid appears sporadically. These compounds can aid identification when morphological traits overlap with closely related species. No single set of macroscopic characters is diagnostic, so a combination of chemistry and DNA data is the most reliable means of recognition.

== Habitat and distribution ==
Rhizoplaca occulta is known to occur only in the interior western United States. Confirmed collections come from high-elevation sites in Idaho, Nevada, and Utah, including the type locality at 3,150 m on basalt outcrops of Cave Mountain, Nevada. The lichen typically colonizes exposed, calcium-poor rocks such as basalt, granite, or schist within open pinyon–juniper woodlands, but vagrant cushions can also occur free on coarse soil. All verified specimens were gathered between roughly 2,500 and 3,300 m (8,200 and 10,800 ft) where insolation is strong, moisture is episodic, and winter snow persists for part of the year. The scattered records and limited sampling suggest R. occulta may be more widespread in suitable subalpine habitats of the Great Basin and northern Rocky Mountains, yet it remains under-documented because of its cryptic appearance and the need for molecular confirmation.
