= Lichen systematics =

Study of lichen taxonomy and evolution

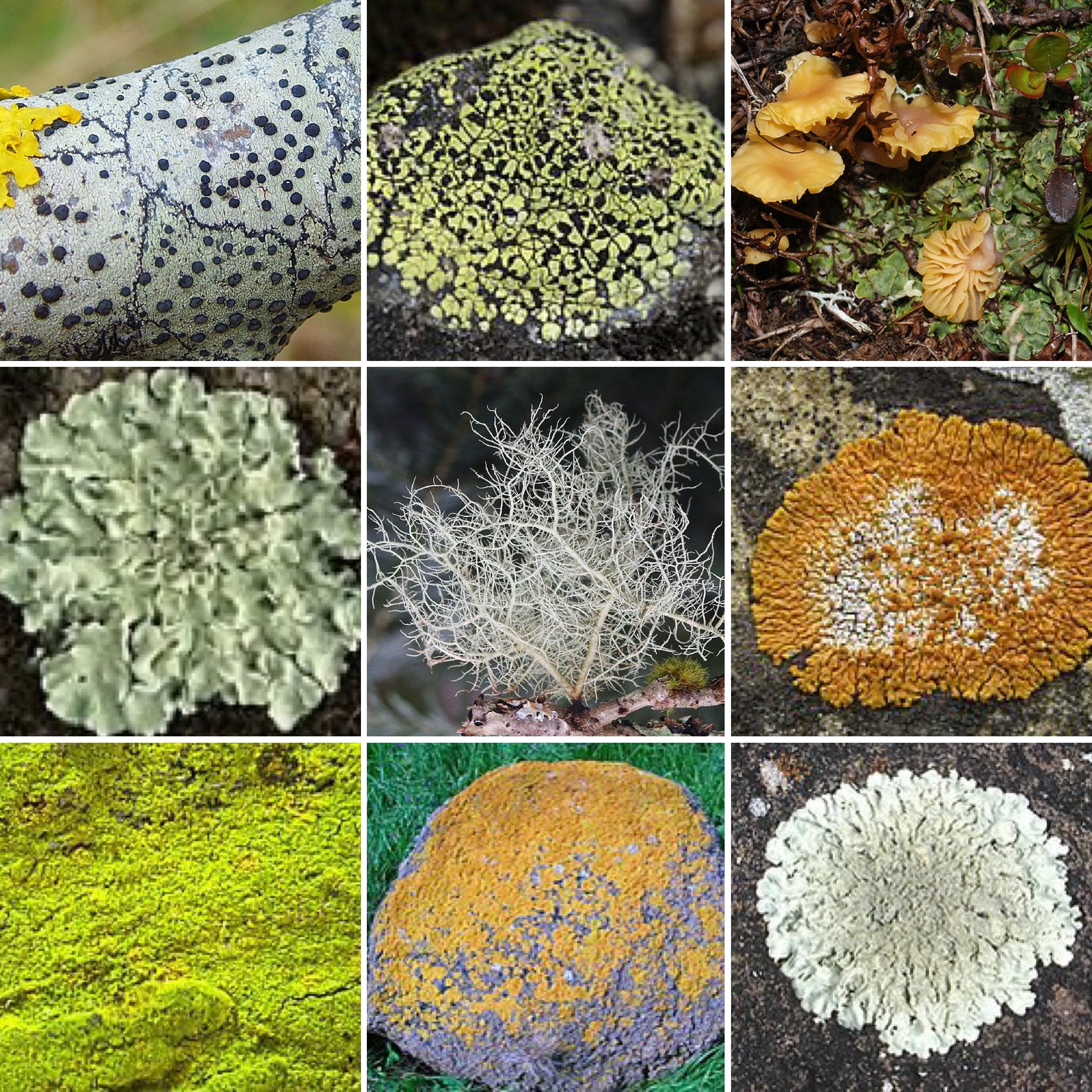
Lichen growth-form spectrum. Crustose, placodioid, foliose, fruticose, leprose—and an mushroom-like basidiolichen (top right)—illustrate the wide morphological range that a single fungus-plus-alga partnership can assume—demonstrating the diversity that lichen systematics organizes.

Lichen systematics is the study of how lichens are classified and related to each other, combining the naming of lichen taxa, the reconstruction of their evolutionary history, and the organization of this diversity into a coherent framework. In contrast to an individual fungus or plant, a lichen is not a single organism but a miniature ecosystem—a symbiotic partnership between a fungus (the mycobiont) and a photosynthetic partner (the photobiont, typically an alga or cyanobacterium). Because a lichen has no independent evolutionary lineage apart from its partners, classification is based chiefly on the fungus's family tree.

Lichen systematics underpins broader biodiversity research and conservation. Species are the fundamental units in ecology and biogeography, so a stable taxonomy is essential for tracking environmental changes and protecting vulnerable species. Inaccurate taxonomy can mislead science and policy. One audit of conservation data found that database records for a rare lichen had been misidentified or filed under obsolete names, distorting assessments of its geographic range. Modern lichen systematics therefore emphasizes rigorous definition of species boundaries and thorough documentation as the foundation for studying lichens' ecology and evolution.

At its core, lichen systematics rests on four interlinked pillars. These are taxonomy (discovering, describing, and naming species), nomenclature (ensuring the correct and universally accepted naming of those species), phylogeny (inferring the evolutionary relationships among species), and classification (arranging species into higher-order groups like genera, families, and orders). These activities are interdependent. For example, naming a new species (an act of taxonomy) automatically places it within a genus, implicitly hypothesizing a relationship to other members of that genus. Likewise, classifications are continually revised as phylogenetic studies uncover more natural (evolutionarily valid) groupings. A guiding principle in modern systematics is to ensure that each recognized group includes all descendants of one common ancestor (a condition called monophyly). Groupings based only on superficial similarity rather than real ancestry are considered artificial; when studies reveal such cases, the groups are reorganized to reflect true evolutionary lineages. In practice this means many traditional lichen groups defined by convenient field characters (such as all "crustose" lichens or all lichens with a certain type of fruiting body) have been dismantled, and their members redistributed, to ensure that each genus or family reflects a single evolutionary lineage.

Lichen systematics has been revolutionized in recent decades by molecular biology and genomics. DNA sequencing now allows researchers to resolve cryptic species and deep evolutionary relationships that were impossible to discern from morphology alone. Entire genomes of lichen-forming fungi can be sequenced, offering a wealth of characters for phylogenetic analysis and revealing genes involved in symbiosis. These advances have led to a surge of new insights—for instance, the discovery of many previously unrecognized species within what were thought to be single, widespread taxa. Yet, traditional morphology and chemistry remain indispensable in the field. A 2018–2020 survey found that fewer than half of newly described lichen species were accompanied by any DNA data, and only about 10% had more than three genetic loci sequenced. Most new species are still identified and circumscribed using features like spores, reproductive structures, and secondary metabolites. Lichenologists thus operate with a blend of old and new methods: high-throughput sequencing might pinpoint lineages of interest, but microscopy, spot tests, and thin-layer chromatography are still routinely used to characterize and confirm the organisms. The field is moving toward an integrative approach in which morphological, chemical, and molecular evidence are all brought to bear on defining species and higher taxa.

== Overview of historical development ==
=== Pre-dual hypothesis concepts (before 1867) ===
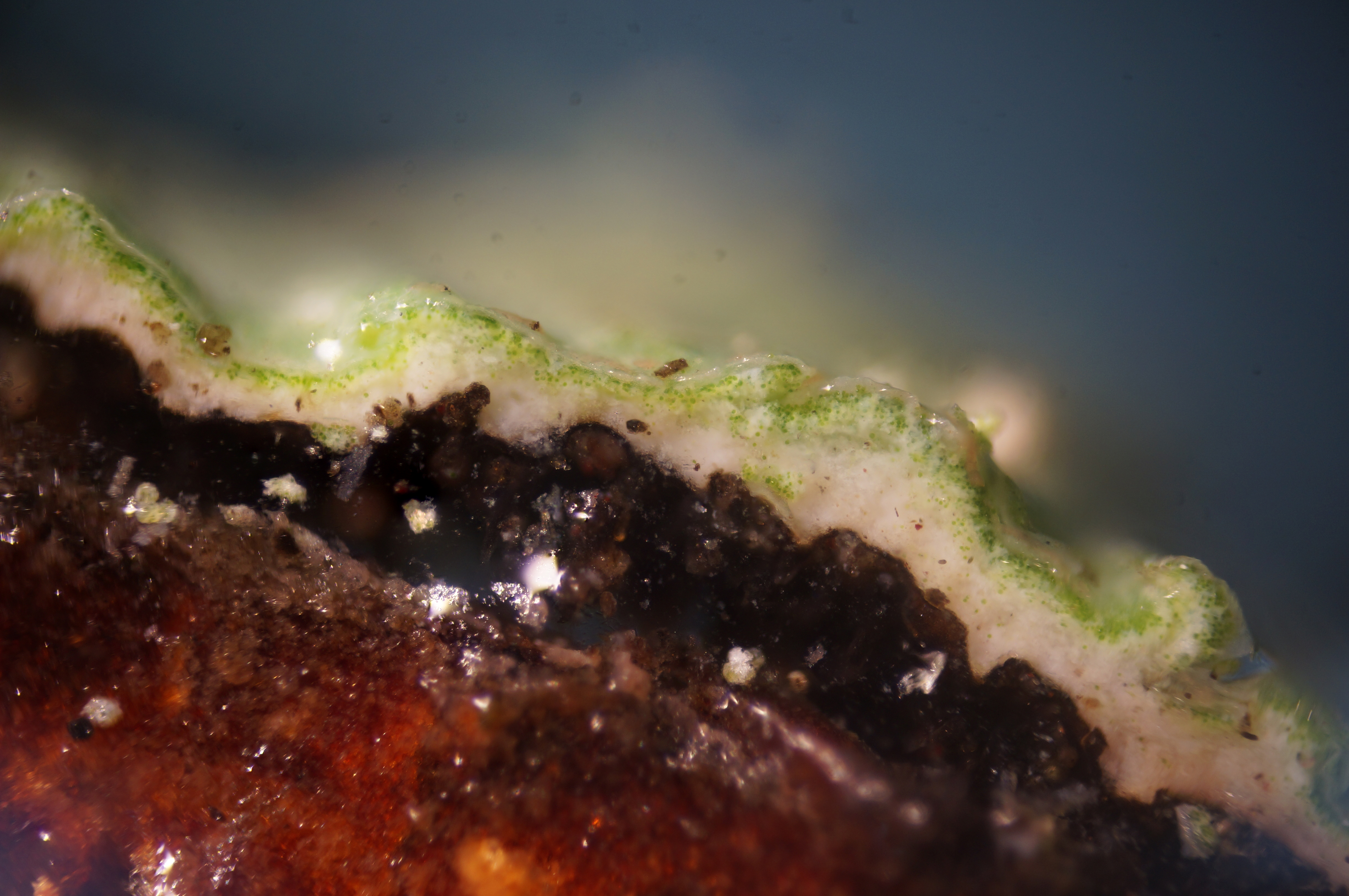
Cross-section of a lichen thallus showing the symbiotic relationship between fungal and algal partners. The bright green layer contains the photosynthetic algae (photobiont), while the darker tissue below represents the fungal component (mycobiont) that provides structure and absorbs water and nutrients.

For centuries, naturalists treated lichens as self-contained, plant-like organisms distinguished only by outward appearance. Theophrastus (c. 300 BC) introduced the word lichen for crusty bark growths, yet offered little insight beyond the name. Until the mid-1700s, taxonomists lumped lichens with algae, mosses, or fungi in broad, pre-evolutionary schemes. A pivotal step came in 1700, when the French botanist Joseph Pitton de Tournefort erected the genus Lichen, acknowledging the group's distinctiveness—even while keeping it beside mosses and liverworts. Robert Morison's 1699 Herbarium, for instance, split lichens into five "Muscofungi" types, a purely morphological scheme that left little mark on later work. The Italian polymath Pier Antonio Micheli published the first recognizable lichen classification in his 1729 Nova plantarum genera. While he kept all species in the catch‑all genus Lichen—echoing Tournefort—Micheli organized them into several "orders" based on thallus texture and fruiting body form. Those informal groupings later became the nuclei of modern genera, and his morphological terminology laid the groundwork for subsequent binomial treatments.

In 1753 Carl Linnaeus introduced the first coherent plant-classification scheme in Species Plantarum. He listed roughly 80 lichen species, grouping almost all under the single genus Lichen. Such compression mirrored 18th-century ignorance of lichen diversity: 'lichen' was little more than a catch-all for crusty or leafy growths on bark and stone. Real advancement came in the early 1800s, when Linnaeus's student Erik Acharius—later hailed as the "father of lichenology"—re-examined the group. From 1798 to 1814, Acharius published four influential monographs that divided Lichen into numerous genera and sketched a finer hierarchy: Lichenographiae Suecicae Prodromus (1798), Methodus (1803), Lichenographia Universalis (1810), and Synopsis Methodica Lichenum (1814). Beyond cataloguing hundreds of species, he introduced microscopic characters—such as the structure of the spore-producing bodies (apothecia)—as classificatory tools. His anatomical focus freed lichenology from its old dependence on thallus form (crustose, foliose, fruticose) and laid the groundwork for a multi-character "natural" system. During the early–mid 1800s, lichen taxonomists steadily wove fresh microscopic insights into their work. With compound microscopes common by the 1830s, researchers saw that lichens contain distinct internal layers and reproductive organs. A cadre of European "microscope taxonomists"—Antoine Fée, Giuseppe De Notaris, Vittore Trevisan, Camille Montagne, Ernst Stizenberger and Edward Tuckerman—used those details to delimit genera on ascospore shape, septation and exciple anatomy, giving lichenology its first genuinely anatomical classification.

Meanwhile, William Nylander drew on micro‑anatomy to craft a far richer hierarchical scheme, describing hundreds of new taxa yet largely ignoring spore data. In his 1858 synopsis he even arranged lichens along an "algal‑to‑fungal continuum"—a speculative evolutionary ladder that cast the thallus as a transitional stage between algae and true fungi. Although soon eclipsed by Schwendener's dual‑symbiosis hypothesis, the idea shows that lichenologists were already grappling with gradations between the symbionts well before the composite nature of the organism was proved.

Other botanists emphasised spores and propagules as diagnostic features. Britons William Lauder Lindsay (1851) and Henry Mudd (1861) proposed splitting genera by spore number, size and septation, while continental workers such as Abramo Bartolommeo Massalongo and Gustav Wilhelm Körber built whole generic frameworks around ascospore traits, sparking debate yet adding critical descriptors. By 1867 lichenology had grown from Linnaeus's single‑genus sketch into a specialized field, complete with dozens of experts, thousands of named species and a nascent multi-character taxonomy linking thallus form, anatomy and reproduction—just in time for the coming revolution that would redefine lichens as symbiotic fungi.

=== The dual hypothesis and its controversy (1867–1900) ===
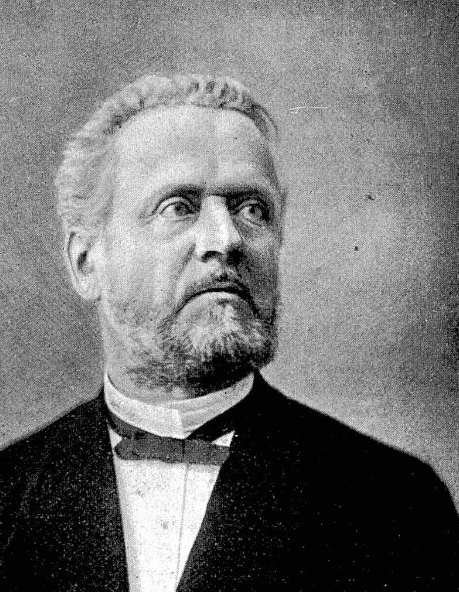
Simon Schwendener's 1867 "dual hypothesis" —that a lichen is a fungus farming an alga—ignited a storm that upended 19th‑century lichenology.

In 1867 the Swiss botanist Simon Schwendener upended orthodox lichen theory with a daring new hypothesis. In a lecture in September he argued that a lichen is a duo—a fungus that houses an alga—rather than a lone organism. His "dual hypothesis" cast the thallus as fungal tissue farming algal cells for photosynthate. Microscopy revealed algal 'gonidia' embedded in the fungal matrix, but many colleagues dismissed his reading. William Nylander repudiated the "composite" idea, viewing it as an affront to his life's work. The British lichenologist James Crombie derided the notion as a "master-and-slave" model—an enslaving parasitic fungus and its algal captive—and rebutted it in Encyclopædia Britannica. The dispute turned bitter, exposing both paradigm shock and the insularity of 19th-century lichenology.

Despite the early backlash, proof for the dual hypothesis piled up during the 1870s–1880s. In 1872 Heinrich Anton de Bary—later to codify "symbiosis"—published work backing the fungal–algal alliance. Albert Frank coined "symbiose" in 1877 (de Bary anglicised it to "symbiosis" in 1879), recasting the partnership as mutualistic, not parasitic. Significantly, botanists started lab resynthesis—laboratory recreation of lichens from separated components. In 1873 Édouard Bornet matched lichen gonidia to free-living algae from 60-plus genera, proving the algae could live alone. Soon after, Hermann Reess (1872) grew fresh Collema thalli from fungal spores and algal cells; by 1886 Jules Bonnier had done the same with Xanthoria and other genera. These resynthesis experiments provided strong evidence: lichens are a product of symbiosis. The dual hypothesis gained influential supporters; in 1878, Royal Society president Joseph Hooker publicly endorsed Schwendener's theory in his annual address, and by 1880 leading British and American textbooks presented lichens as dual organisms.

By 1900 the consensus had shifted. Most botanists now viewed lichens as fungi partnered with algae or cyanobacteria and reclassified them accordingly. Dissent lingered. In a 1909 poll of 42 botanists, Bruce Fink found 18 calling lichens dual organisms, 14 insisting they were fungi, and the rest undecided. Yet even holdouts were beginning to adopt the dual view. The Finnish lichenologist Edvard Vainio (1890) folded lichens into a fungal scheme—labelling them fungi that happen to form symbioses—a move said to have cost him a professorship. The next puzzle was how to classify lichens now that their dual nature was clear. Taxonomists questioned whether to base classification on fungal traits, algal traits, or both. In practice, they chose the fungus. Since the fungus governs reproduction and form, its fruiting bodies and spores carried the most taxonomic weight. By the late 1800s, taxonomists grouped lichens by fungal traits—spore colour, septation, fruiting-body type—rather than thallus shape or algal partner. The shift broke with thallus-based schemes and aligned lichen study with modern fungal taxonomy. Yet the symbiosis raised a century-long puzzle: if multiple fungi adopted algal partners independently, the "lichen condition" might be polyphyletic. This question of how many times lichenization evolved remained speculative until the advent of molecular phylogenetics. Early lichenologists such as Walter Watson warned that symbiosis can so remodel a fungus that its ancestry becomes hard to trace. Modern molecular studies confirm the problem: convergent thallus forms have evolved repeatedly and even been lost again, making ancestry hard to infer.

=== Consolidation and new classification frameworks (1900–1950) ===
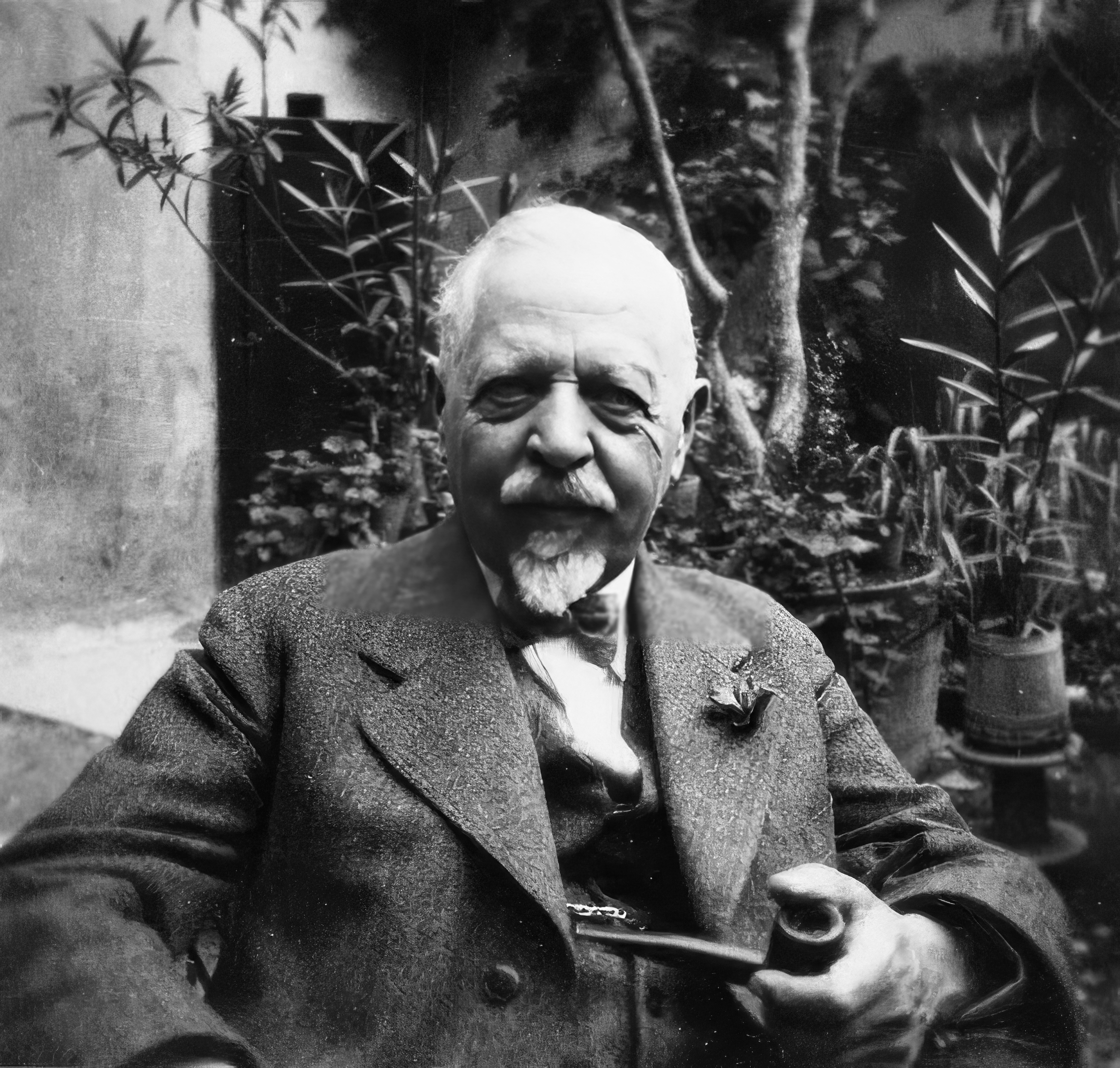
Alexander Zahlbruckner, the Austrian lichenologist whose 11-volume Catalogus Lichenum Universalis (1907–1922) codified every known lichen species and set the standard global classification for the first half of the 20th century

After 1900, once the dual nature of lichens was accepted, researchers set out to place them in a coherent taxonomic framework. For the next half-century, lichenologists treated lichens as a distinct fungal subclass—separate from other fungi yet organized by fungal traits. Alexander Zahlbruckner's monumental work epitomized this approach. Between 1907 and 1922, Zahlbruckner issued the multi-volume Catalogus Lichenum Universalis, a comprehensive catalogue and classification of every lichen then known. He first separated lichens by fungal class: the common Ascolichenes, with ascomycete hosts, and the rarer Basidiolichenes, built on basidiomycete hosts. Within Ascolichenes he next used fruiting-body form: taxa with exposed disc-like apothecia formed the Gymnocarpeae (roughly today's Lecanoromycetes), whereas those with flask-shaped, enclosed fruiting bodies became the Pyrenocarpeae (comparable to modern Ostropomycetidae). He further split these into families and suborders on spore and apothecial details—for example, Graphidineae for crustose taxa with carbonised, branching fruiting bodies (e.g., Graphis) and Cyclocarpineae for lichens bearing shield-shaped apothecia across several thallus types. Although the scheme still sat outside the broader fungal code, prioritising traits thought to track fungal evolution brought it closer to a natural system. Zahlbruckner's catalogue soon became the global standard, prized for its exhaustive synthesis even though several groupings later proved artificial.

Early-20th-century schemes put the fungal partner's morphology and chemistry first. Observers noted that thallus form—crusty, leafy, or shrubby—could vary within a lineage under different environments or slight genetic shifts. By contrast, spore traits and thecium structure stayed constant and resisted ecological plasticity. Watson (1929) argued that reproductive parts deserve priority: they belong solely to the fungus, whereas thallus form—shaped by both partners—can mislead. Field keys of the era highlighted spore colour (hyaline vs. brown), septation (simple, muriform, etc.), ascus type, and chemical spot tests to sort genera and families. Thallus form still appeared, but only as a secondary cue once the "primary" traits had fixed a specimen's position. This fungal focus flowed directly from the dual hypothesis: lichens were now viewed as fungi first.

Accepting lichens as fungi raised a nomenclatural riddle: does the word "lichen" refer to the whole consortium or only to the fungal partner? In 1913 Bruce Fink declared that "the lichen is a fungus pure and simple", framing the issue in stark terms. A more radical solution arrived in the 1950s when Raffaele Ciferri and Ruggero Tomaselli proposed parallel names for the cultured fungal partner, adding the suffix ‑myces (e.g. Cladoniomyces for the Cladonia mycobiont). Their scheme ran straight into the newly adopted Stockholm Code (1952), which already covered lichens under the International Code of Botanical Nomenclature, and the –myces names were soon ruled illegitimate. Since then the community has treated the ordinary fungal binomial as the correct name, whether the fungus is lichenised in nature or grown axenically in culture.

While most authors still relied on a stand‑alone lichen framework, a few pioneers argued that lichens should be incorporated into the wider fungal system. John Axel Nannfeldt opened the door in 1932 by dividing the Ascomycota into "ascohymenial" and "ascolocular" lineages based on ascoma development and ascus wall structure, a paradigm that implicitly scattered lichen‑forming fungi across several ordinary ascomycete orders. Rolf Santesson took the first practical step in 1952: studying foliicolous (leaf-dwelling) lichens, he slotted them into Nannfeldt's ascomycete orders rather than the catch-all "Lichenes". Each genus went into an ordinary ascomycete order or family alongside non-lichenised fungi. Each genus thus sat alongside non‑lichenised relatives, showing that lichens required no special Linnaean compartment. This idea was bold for its time (challenging the status quo). Even by the mid-20th century, most lichen funga still treated "Lichenes" as a separate category — lichen specialists maintained their own journals, herbaria, and methods. True integration with mainstream fungal classification only gathered pace once modern molecular methods arrived. Even after it was superseded, Zahlbruckner's catalogue—tens of thousands of names—remained the baseline for later revisions. Within that framework, lichenologists were already aware of potential flaws. Watson warned in 1929 that several of Zahlbruckner's "orders" were probably not monophyletic. He foresaw that deeper evolutionary probes would shatter or reshape those groups—exactly what molecular phylogenetics later did.

== Mid-20th-century innovations ==
After 1950, and before the advent of molecular techniques, lichenologists adopted several new approaches to refine classification. The mid-20th century brought innovations in chemical analysis and microscopy that revealed cryptic diversity and new structural characters.

=== Chemosystematics and secondary metabolites ===
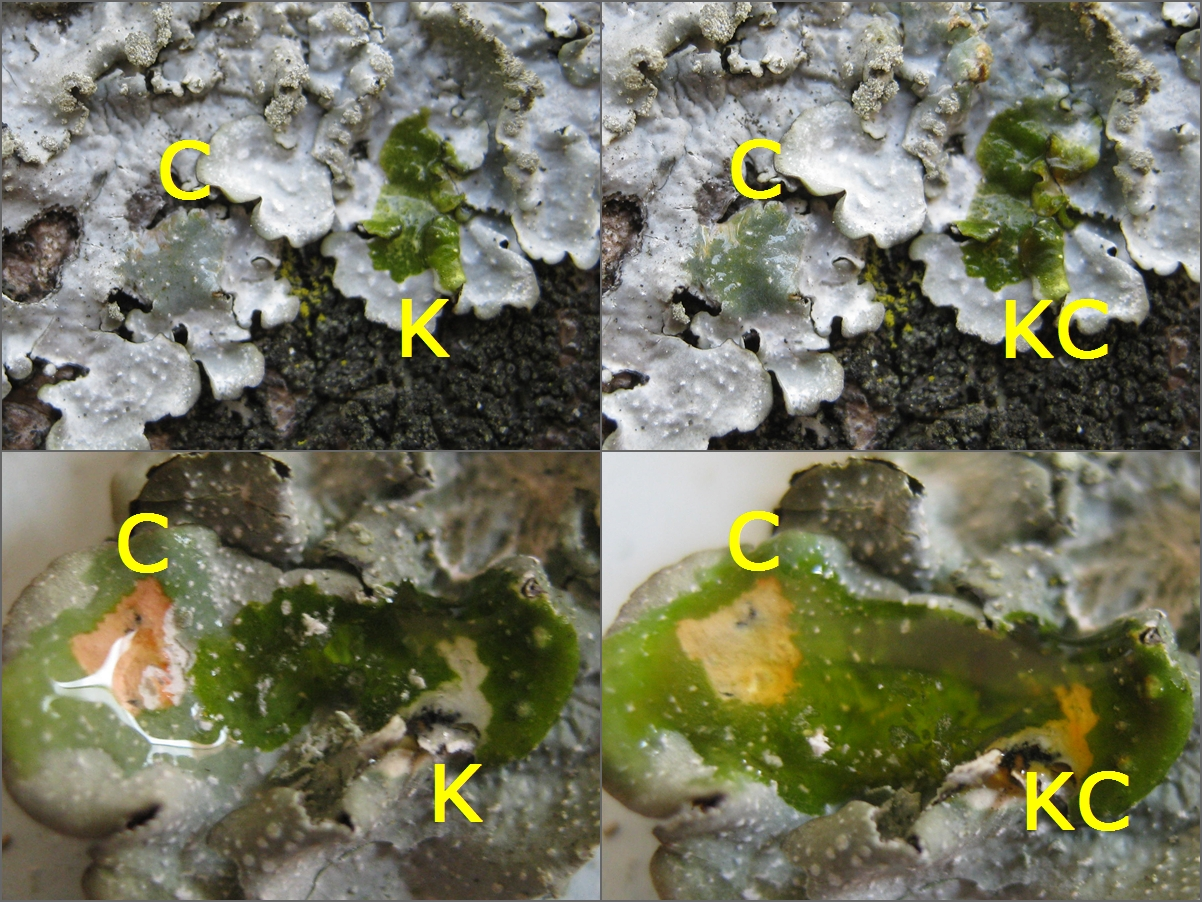
Results of chemical spot tests on the foliose lichen Punctelia borreri showing thallus (top) and medulla (bottom). Simple spot tests like these are routinely used to help identify lichen species.

By the mid-1900s, lichenologists were already exploiting chemical traits for classification—decades before such methods reached vascular plant taxonomy. Because many lichens synthesize distinctive secondary metabolites (specialized compounds including lichen products unique to these organisms), workers devised simple spot tests in which reagents applied to the thallus yield diagnostic colour changes. The technique dates to the 1860s, but by 1951, the tests were routine. Elke Mackenzie listed K (potassium hydroxide solution), C (sodium hypochlorite), and Pd (p-phenylenediamine) as key diagnostic reagents because species often differ in their colour reactions. For example, a yellow K reaction usually signals the presence of the common metabolite atranorin, whereas a deep-red Pd reaction suggests certain depsidones.

The chemical toolbox expanded sharply with the adoption of thin-layer chromatography (TLC) in the late 1960s. Chicita F. Culberson's Chemical and Botanical Guide to Lichen Products (1969) laid out a reproducible protocol for separating trace compounds from minute thallus chips, making TLC profiles a standard component of species descriptions. David Hawksworth's 1976 synthesis went a step further by integrating metabolite patterns into family‑ and order‑level frameworks, demonstrating that chemistry could diagnose natural groups and foreshadowing the molecular phylogenies that would follow.

Chemical tests revealed cryptic diversity beneath outwardly uniform lichens. Researchers reported numerous "chemical strains" or chemotypes: lichens identical in appearance yet separable by their metabolites. For instance, MacKenzie (1951) noted that morphologically identical Stereocaulon tomentosum forms differed in chemistry—one containing stictic acid, the other fumarprotocetraric acid. These chemotypes often occupy different regions or microhabitats, and breeding or DNA data have since supported treating them as separate species. Metabolite profiles also informed higher-level classification. In some cases, entire genera were defined or redefined by their chemical profiles. In the Cetraria group, species rich in specific fatty acids were placed in Platismatia, whereas taxa containing orcinol depsidones were transferred to Cetrelia; the shift was consistent with their chemical differences. Chemical data further resolved misclassifications based solely on morphology. For example, species formerly combined in Anaptychia were divided after researchers noted that forms with thick-walled spores and a medulla containing zeorin plus specific depsidones formed a coherent group (Heterodermia), whereas thin-walled, chemically simpler taxa stayed in Anaptychia.

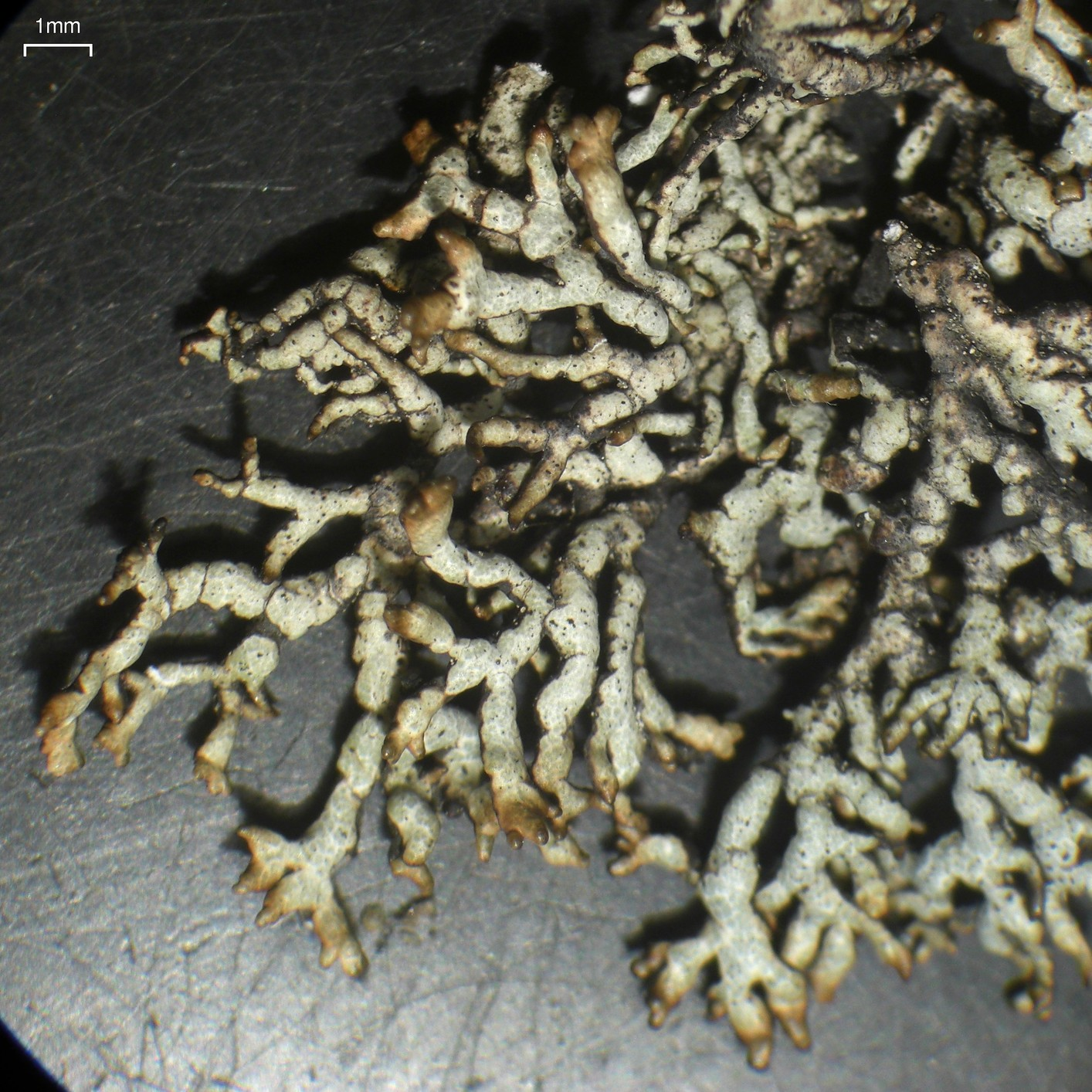
The recognition of Brodoa oroarctica as a distinct species marked an advance in lichen taxonomy, as it demonstrated how chemical analysis could reveal previously overlooked differences between North American and European lichens that appear similar to the naked eye.

By the 1970s, chemotaxonomic surveys were uncovering dozens of chemically defined species, underscoring the extent of cryptic diversity. One review reported 240 distinct chemical variants across 99 examined morphospecies. Subsequent DNA studies confirmed that many variants correspond to distinct lineages. Two chemical forms of the long-recognized Parmeliopsis ambigua illustrate this pattern. One form contains usnic acid, the other atranorin. These proved to be separate species when molecular data showed they are not sister taxa. Chemical characters remain central to routine identification and increasingly inform conservation assessments. A 2024 herbarium study of the rare Brodoa oroarctica uncovered misidentified records; only classic spot tests (K, C, Pd) and TLC clarified the species' true range, demonstrating the ongoing value of traditional chemical tools beside modern molecular methods.

=== Ultrastructure and electron microscopy ===
The 1970s and 1980s provided new insights into lichen structure at the subcellular level. Aino Henssen and Hans Jahns revolutionised morphology‑centred systematics in 1973 by publishing an anatomy‑driven classification that combined light microscopy and electron microscopy data on 68 characters spanning ascoma development (ontogeny), ascus structure and photobiont interfaces. Their tree anticipated several clades later corroborated by DNA—such as the segregation of Gomphillaceae and the heterogeneous nature of the Ostropales—and it cemented detailed developmental anatomy as an indispensable taxonomic tool. Transmission electron microscopy (TEM) let researchers view cell walls, membranes, and attachment sites where the fungal and algal partners meet. Rosmarie Honegger's 1986 TEM survey examined the fungus–alga interface in more than 40 lichens, all harbouring Trebouxia photobionts. She observed that lichen fungi form three main types of contact structures (called haustoria). In one type, the fungal filaments (hyphae) penetrate directly into the algal cell ("intracellular" haustoria). In another, the filaments push between layers of the algal cell wall without breaking the plasma membrane ("intraparietal"). In the third, the fungus simply presses against the algal cell wall ("wall-to-wall"). Each lichen lineage consistently uses only one of these interaction styles, making it a useful trait for classification. For example, most crustose lichens have intracellular haustoria, whereas foliose and fruticose lichens tend to have intraparietal ones. In lichens whose Trebouxia partner bears a sporopollenin-rich wall, the fungus cannot penetrate and resorts to the intraparietal strategy. The interface therefore records co-evolution, and haustorial type may flag evolutionary shifts or delimit higher taxa.

Scanning-electron microscopy (SEM) and freeze-etching next exposed the outer surfaces of lichen hyphae. Honegger (1984) freeze-fractured thalli to reveal successive wall layers and surface textures. She showed that symbiotic hyphae develop characteristic coatings: Peltigera species carry dense protein rodlets, whereas genera such as Parmelia and Cladonia display patchy, maze-like mosaics. Cultured (non-symbiotic) isolates lack these coatings, confirming their symbiotic origin. Because wall textures are consistent within genera or families, they became additional diagnostic traits. Functionally, the coatings likely improve adhesion to the algal partner. Freeze-etch images also revealed matching pits or projections in the algal wall, forming an interlocking contact surface. These precise contact structures demonstrate how symbiotic integration can produce distinctive morphological characters. Together with haustorial form, these ultrastructural characters aid genus- or family-level delimitation and illuminate how often particular symbiotic mechanisms evolved—issues now revisited with molecular datasets.

== The cladistic turn (1970s–1990s) ==
By the late 20th century lichen systematics adopted the quantitative, computer-aided methods gaining ground across biology. Numerical taxonomy (phenetics) and cladistics entered lichenology, paralleling their uptake in plant and animal studies. Researchers replaced qualitative judgement with data matrices that coded morphological, chemical, and anatomical characters, then applied algorithms to infer relationships. Phenetic studies of the 1970s grouped lichens with clustering routines; in the 1980s Willi Hennig's cladistics shifted focus to shared-derived characters (synapomorphies) for reconstructing evolutionary trees. The shift required clear definitions of characters and explicit decisions about which traits were primitive or derived. Analyses became repeatable and easy to update as new characters or taxa were added. Robert Lücking (2020) called this methodological turn a milestone on par with the invention of the microscope for taxonomy. The new methods added rigour and standardization, aligning lichen systematics with broader evolutionary biology. Manuals on numerical and cladistic techniques were widely adopted, and phylogenetic workshops became regular features of lichen conferences.

Cladistic rigour prompted a reassessment of single-trait classifications. Earlier systems frequently anchored families or genera on a single trait—spore septation, a particular metabolite, and so on. Cladistic analyses showed that such one-character groupings often masked true relationships. One prominent case was the classification of ascolichen families by the structure of the ascus apex (the tip of the spore sac). Josef Hafellner (1984) reorganized many ascolichen families by ascus-apex staining (amyloid ring present vs. absent), treating that feature as primary. Later DNA work found several of those families to be polyphyletic: the ascus type had arisen independently in unrelated lineages.

The results echoed Nylander's century-old warning against single-trait taxonomy. Leif Tibell (1998) urged that robust taxa rest on multiple, independent characters. Pier Luigi Nimis (1998) warned that elevating every apparent clade to genus rank risks "explosive inflation" and listed five tests—monophyly, formal analysis, ≥ 1 diagnostic trait, broad sampling, and demonstrable informational gain—before renaming species. Where those tests are not met, Nimis advised using subgeneric rank so that binomials remain stable. Tibell further separated goals: classification should provide a stable, useful scheme, whereas phylogeny seeks the full branching pattern. He argued that constant renaming for every new tree can undermine nomenclatural stability; revisions should await strong, multi-line evidence. These philosophical perspectives influenced how lichenologists handled emerging molecular results a few years later. By the late 1990s lichenologists, trained in data matrices and synapomorphy logic, were ready to fold DNA data into taxonomy. Lücking (2020) notes that the cladistic era laid the groundwork that made the transition to molecular phylogenetics relatively seamless: researchers already expected to use computers and algorithms, understood the importance of synapomorphies, and were prepared to revise taxonomy when evidence demanded. Cladistics ended the idea of lichen exceptionalism: lichens now had to fit into the tree of life under the same systematic rules as other organisms.

System‑wide name curation entered a new phase in 1982 when Ove Eriksson issued the first Outline of the Ascomycetes, a periodically updated checklist that synthesized every formal taxonomic change. Retitled Outline of Ascomycota in 1999 and maintained through successive editions by Eriksson, Thorsten Lumbsch, Amy Huhndorf and collaborators, the living document functioned as a community "open‑source" ledger. Its numbered notes traced each genus‑level move and provided a stable reference frame that eased the transition from morphology‑based to molecule‑based systematics, right up to the final 2010 update.

== Molecular era ==
=== Sanger-era multigene phylogenies (1990s–2000s) ===
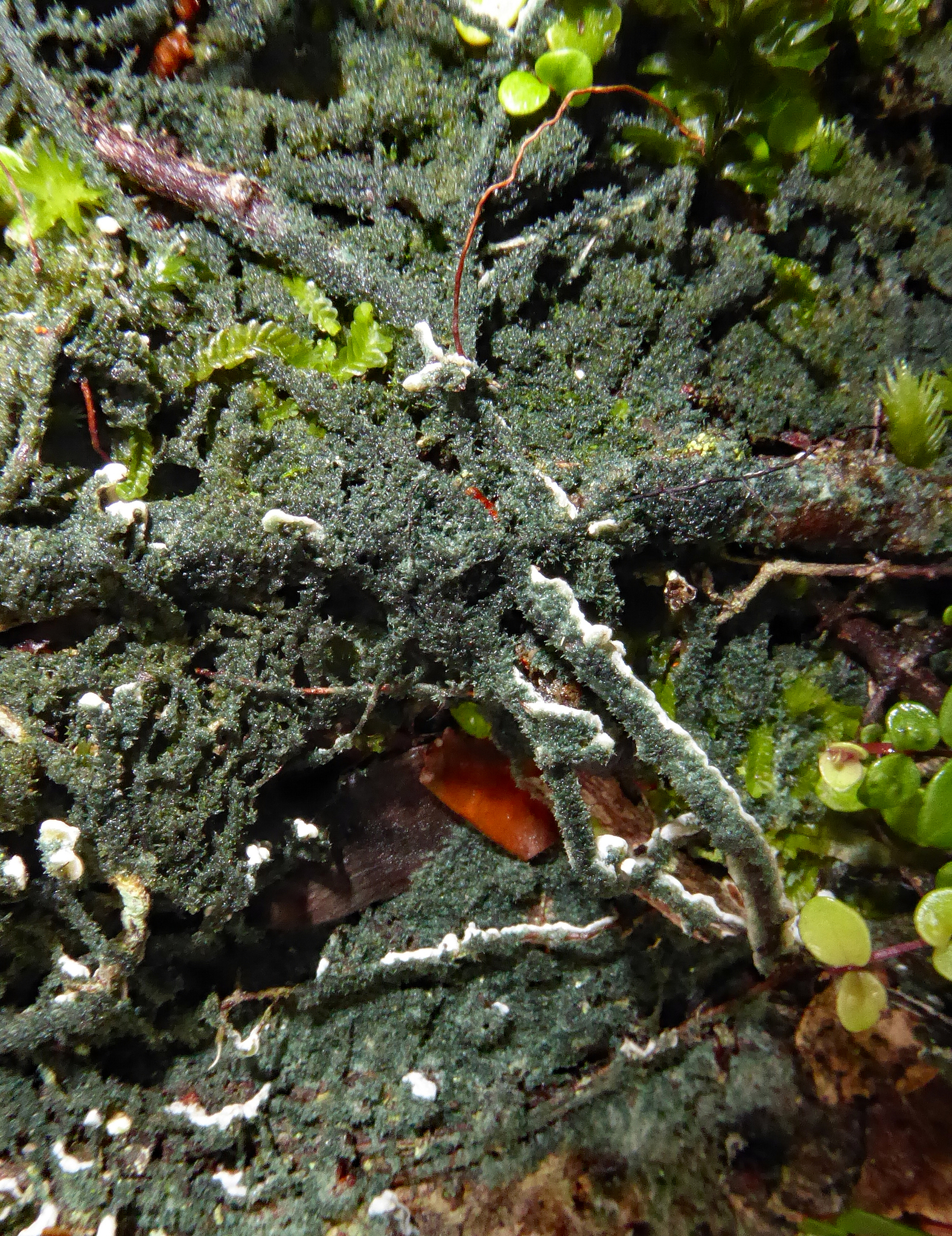
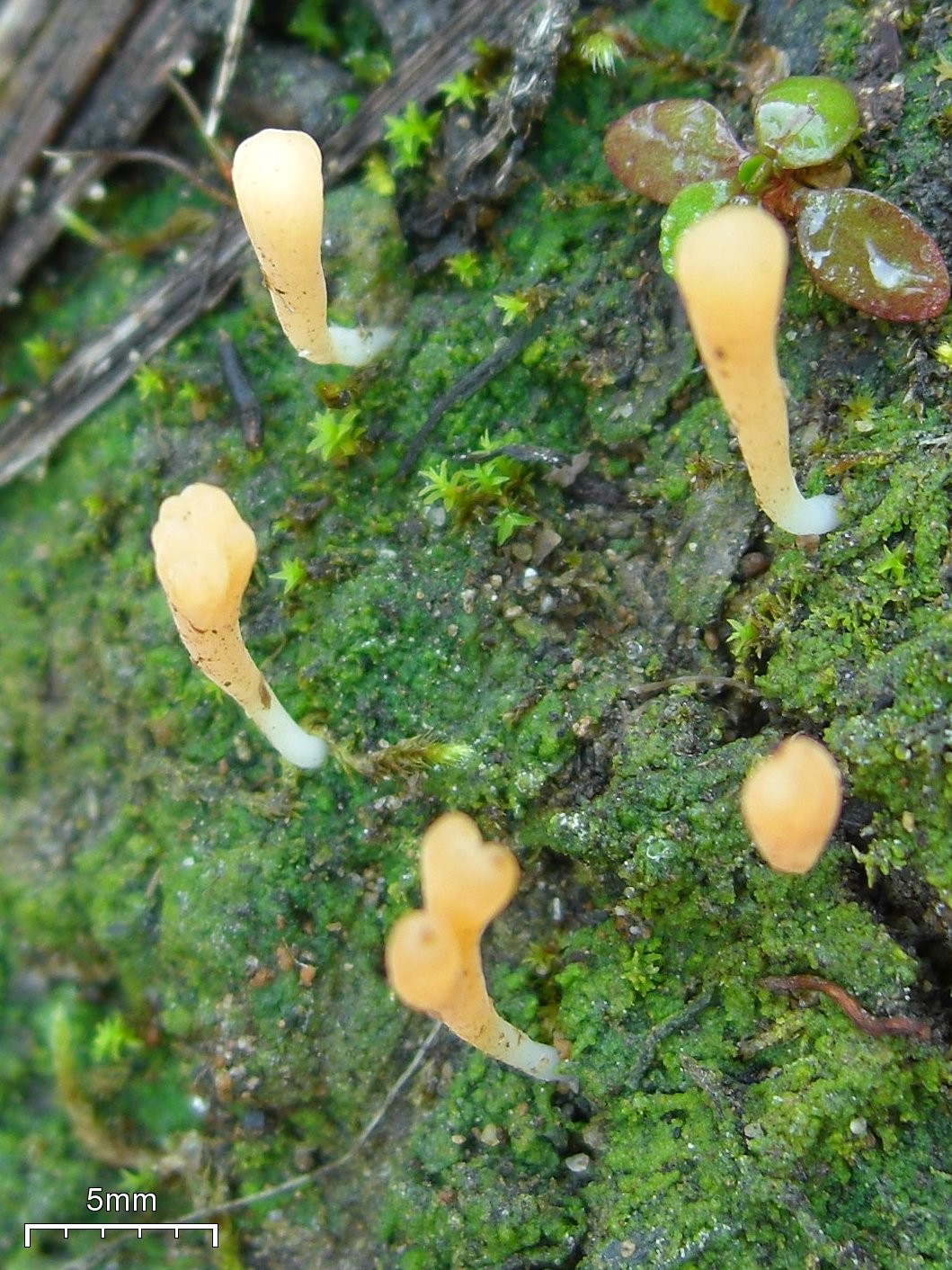
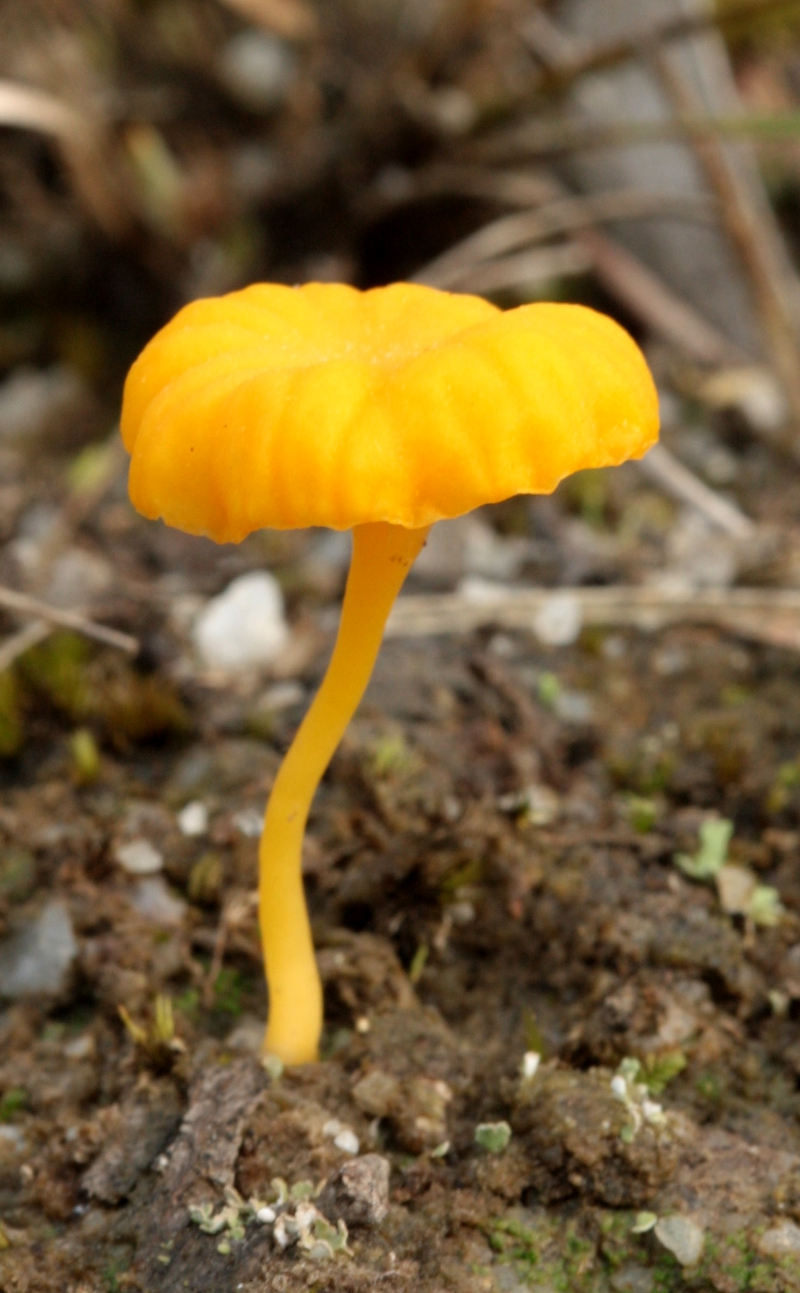
Basidiolichens show that lichenization evolved more than once in mushroom‑forming fungi. Left → right: Dictyonema sericeum (a filamentous "jelly" lichen), Multiclavula vernalis (club‑shaped), and Lichenomphalia chromacea (agaricoid) represent three separate basidiomycete lineages revealed by multigene phylogenies of the 1990s.

Late-20th-century DNA sequencing changed lichen systematics, as it did the rest of biology. By the 1990s gene-specific sequencing (e.g., nuclear ribosomal DNA) was accessible, and lichenologists used it to probe deep relationships and test classical schemes. Initial studies centred on nuclear small-subunit rDNA (nuSSU), a slowly evolving gene found in all fungi. Andrea Gargas and co-workers (1995) compared nuSSU sequences from many fungi, including several lichens. Their data supplied the first clear evidence that lichenization arose independently multiple times. Lichen-forming fungi in the sample occupied at least five separate branches of the fungal tree. Three origins lay in the Basidiomycota—for example Omphalina and Multiclavula (mushroom-forming, algal partners) and Dictyonema (cyanobacterial partner). Two further origins occurred in the Ascomycota: one in the large ascolichen clade now placed in Lecanoromycetes, the other in Arthoniomycetes (e.g., some crustose Arthonia species). The pattern contradicted the view that lichens form a single natural group. Instead, 'lichen' is best seen as a functional category—an ecological strategy adopted by disparate fungal lineages. The study suggested that lichen-forming fungi evolved from saprotrophic or parasitic ancestors, not from a single ancestral lichen; some lineages later lost the symbiosis. In other words, the ability to form a lichen could evolve from a non-lichen state multiple times, and perhaps even be lost (as some primarily lichen-forming groups also include non-lichenized fungi). Later work confirmed the core message: lichenised fungi are polyphyletic, and the symbiosis has arisen repeatedly in fungal evolution. A 2016–2017 global synthesis of lichen‑forming fungi organized the available multigene evidence into a single cladogram. It shows that the 19,409 then-recognized lichenised species—distributed among 1,002 genera and 119 families—are scattered across 40 orders in eight fungal classes. Almost four‑fifths of the species (roughly 15,000) belong to Lecanoromycetes, but sizeable lichen lineages also sit in Arthoniomycetes, Eurotiomycetes, Dothideomycetes and Lichinomycetes, while three much smaller lineages appear in Agaricomycetes and Coniocybomycetes (Basidiomycota) and in Sordariomycetes (Ascomycota). The pattern confirms that lichenization evolved repeatedly and that "lichen" is an ecological strategy rather than a single evolutionary lineage.

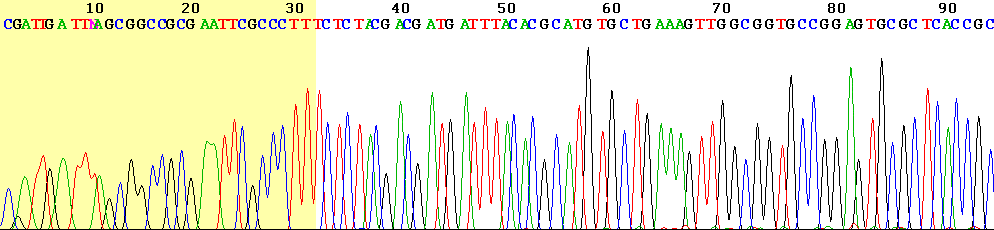
Portion of a Sanger sequencing chromatogram: multi‑coloured peaks mark the four fluorescently labelled bases, the technology that in the 1990s–2000s supplied the multi‑gene DNA data underpinning the first broad phylogenies of lichen‑forming fungi.

By the early 2000s most lichen phylogenies analysed 3–5 genes (a few thousand base pairs in total). Frequently used loci were nuLSU rDNA, ITS (the standard barcode), and protein-coding fragments such as RPB1/2 or β-tubulin. Multilocus trees clarified family- and order-level relationships. They confirmed that almost all lichen-forming ascomycetes fall into three classes: Lecanoromycetes (the largest, e.g., Parmeliaceae, Lecanoraceae, Physciaceae), Eurotiomycetes (e.g., some Verrucaria), and Sordariomycetes (e.g., Graphidaceae). A small minority occur in the Basidiomycota (several agaric and clavarioid orders) or in smaller ascomycete classes. Thus molecular work placed lichens securely within the fungal tree, as Santesson had anticipated. The results prompted extensive revision; orders and families were reorganized to remove polyphyletic groups. For example, the pre-molecular 'Lecanorales' was divided into several orders (Lecanorales, Peltigerales, Teloschistales, etc.) after DNA data showed that superficially similar fruiting bodies did not imply close relationship. By the late 2000s a molecular phylogeny was routine in new taxonomic studies. Traditional methods remained important alongside molecular approaches. Morphology and chemistry remained essential: they guided sampling, framed hypotheses, and provided the diagnostic traits needed to circumscribe taxa. Many new species—particularly from biodiversity-rich regions—were still described from morphology alone or with a single DNA barcode. A review of lichen taxonomic literature from 2018 to 2020 found that of over 700 new species published, only 39% included any DNA sequences. The most commonly used gene was the ITS (present in roughly 82% of those that had molecular data), while only about 10% of new species were supported by three or more genes. These figures show that while multilocus sequencing underpins higher-level systematics, species-level descriptions (alpha taxonomy) often remain constrained by practical limits on sequencing or by the sufficiency of morphological evidence.

Sanger-era phylogenetics laid the groundwork for later genomic studies. By the late 2000s lichenologists had a working framework for most major lineages and clearer criteria for natural versus artificial groups. The framework relied on what now seem small datasets—only a few kilobases per species—yet these sequences resolved many relationships. Although some 2010-era authors questioned the value of small multigene matrices, Lücking (2020) contends that sound sampling and analysis can outweigh sheer data volume. By the early 2020s, many new species—even some higher taxa—are still described from a few gene regions plus morphology, a practise that remains practical where large-scale sequencing is not yet feasible. The Sanger era showed that modest molecular datasets could overturn classifications—splitting some genera, merging others—and it supplied a scaffold for later genome-scale studies.

=== Phylogenomics and next-generation sequencing (2010s–present) ===
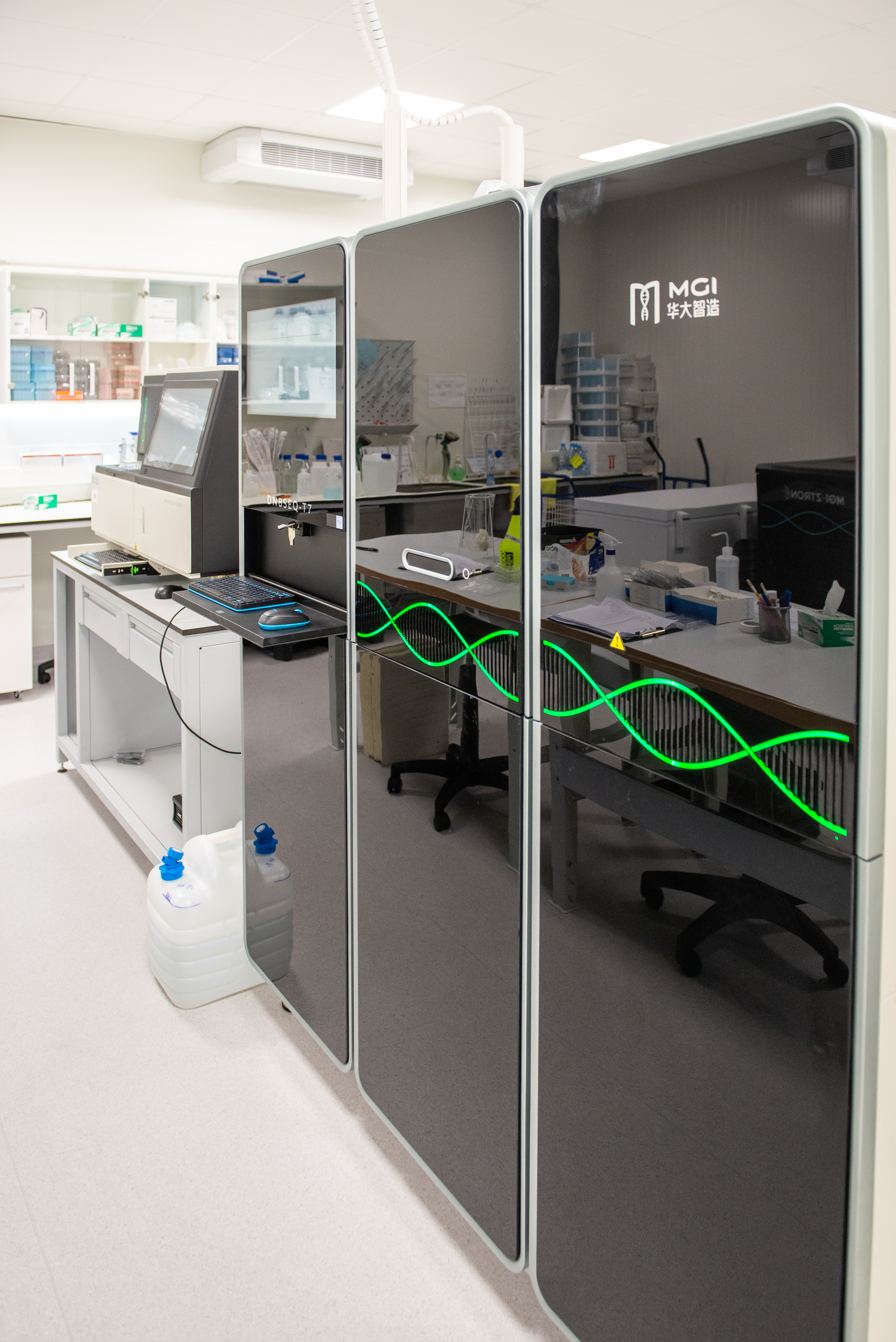
An ultra‑high‑throughput DNBSEQ‑T7 sequencer—the platform can output roughly 6 Tb (about 60 human genome equivalents) in a single 24‑hour run—illustrating the kind of capacity now fuelling large‑scale phylogenomic studies of lichen‑forming fungi.

High-throughput DNA sequencing in the 2010s greatly expanded the scale of data in lichen systematics, allowing entire genomes to be analyzed and timelines of lichen evolution to be estimated. Researchers could sequence hundreds of genes or whole genomes, for both the fungal partner and, in some cases, the photobiont. Phylogenomics applies the same tree-building principles but with exponentially larger datasets, offering greater resolving power. A comparative review by Divakar and Crespo (2015) argues that genome‑scale datasets already outperform multigene matrices at resolving the deepest nodes in the lichen‑forming fungal tree and may be the only realistic route to a fully resolved backbone. For perspective, a typical fungal genome spans 30–50 Mbp; Sanger datasets averaged only 3–5 kb. The added scale lets researchers date major radiations, probe the genetics of symbiosis, and resolve ancient splits left ambiguous by small gene sets. Nelsen et al. (2020) assembled multi-locus data (largely mined from genomes and transcriptomes) for 3,300 lichenised fungi making up about a quarter of Lecanoromycetes and produced the largest time-calibrated phylogeny to date. Their tree suggests a Mesozoic ancestor that was a crustose microlichen with a Trebouxia partner. Foliose and fruticose forms evolved repeatedly, first appearing in the Jurassic–Early Cretaceous and diversifying further in the Cenozoic. The study also found evidence that lichen symbiosis is not a one-way evolutionary dead-end. A large group of primarily lichenized fungi (the subclass Ostropomycetidae) apparently lost the ability to form lichens early in its history, reverting to a saprotrophic lifestyle. Later, some descendants regained a photobiont and lichenized again. This finding contradicts older assumptions that once a fungus became obligately lichenized it could never revert. Lineages with complex thalli, especially those bearing cyanobacterial cephalodia, show higher estimated extinction rates: they diversify rapidly but are more prone to die out, perhaps because of ecological specialization. Such large-scale studies now link geological and climatic shifts, for example, the spread of angiosperm forests in the Late Cretaceous–Early Paleogene, to bursts of lichen diversification, revealing a more intricate evolutionary history. In simple terms, this means lichens diversified in bursts when new habitats (like forests with lots of new tree bark) became available.

New high-throughput techniques are also solving smaller-scale questions once thought intractable. 'Museomics' now retrieves DNA from old, fragmented specimens. For instance, Leavitt and colleagues (2019) shotgun-sequenced decades-old historical type specimens of the Rhizoplaca melanophthalma group. From three crustose thalli they recovered more than a thousand gene regions, sufficient to position each specimen in a phylogenomic tree and match them with modern material. The data showed one specimen was the distinct species R. arbuscula, correcting its earlier misassignment and clarifying the status of the others—using historical material alone. In 2025, whole genome sequencing was successfully carried out on historical lichen specimens, including type material, yielding broad genomic coverage for both the fungal and algal partners and allowing genome-wide phylogenetic analysis of the fungal symbiont. Target-capture and genome skimming now recover mitochondrial and chloroplast genomes from both partners, adding new markers for analysis. Photobiont genomics is revealing how frequently algae switch fungal partners (and vice versa). A phylogenomic study of trebouxiophycean green algae showed that lichenization evolved repeatedly in the group and pinpointed stress-tolerance and carbohydrate-exchange gene families that support the symbiosis.

Despite recent advances, whole-genome data are still rare in routine lichen taxonomy. By the early 2020s, relatively few lichen-forming fungi had published genomes, and still fewer species descriptions relied on genome-scale evidence. A survey by Lendemer (2021) found that of the hundreds of taxa named in 2018–2020, just one included an organelle genome and metagenomic data. Constraints include cost, limited bioinformatic capacity, and the difficulty of disentangling fungal, algal, and microbial DNA within a single thallus. The outlook is improving as costs fall and new methods such as long-read platforms and lab protocols that separate symbiont DNA become available. Open science norms now encourage researchers to deposit raw reads and alignments in public repositories and cite them in taxonomic papers. These practices enhance reproducibility and let future studies reuse data instead of repeating the work.

Even with abundant data, key limitations remain. Lücking (2020) notes that larger datasets do not guarantee better science; sound design, critical analysis, and accurate taxonomy remain essential. A poorly designed study can mislead whether it uses five genes or 5,000 with the error merely scaling up. The aim, then, is to deploy new tools to answer deeper questions, not simply to stockpile sequences. Practitioners advocate a 'minimum adequate method': if five markers plus morphology solve a species boundary, a whole genome is unnecessary. Conversely, issues such as dating deep divergences or detecting genome-wide hybridization do require phylogenomic data. The next-generation sequencing era has accelerated discovery and opened new questions, but it builds on the framework laid by morphology and Sanger sequencing.

=== Case studies in re-circumscription ===
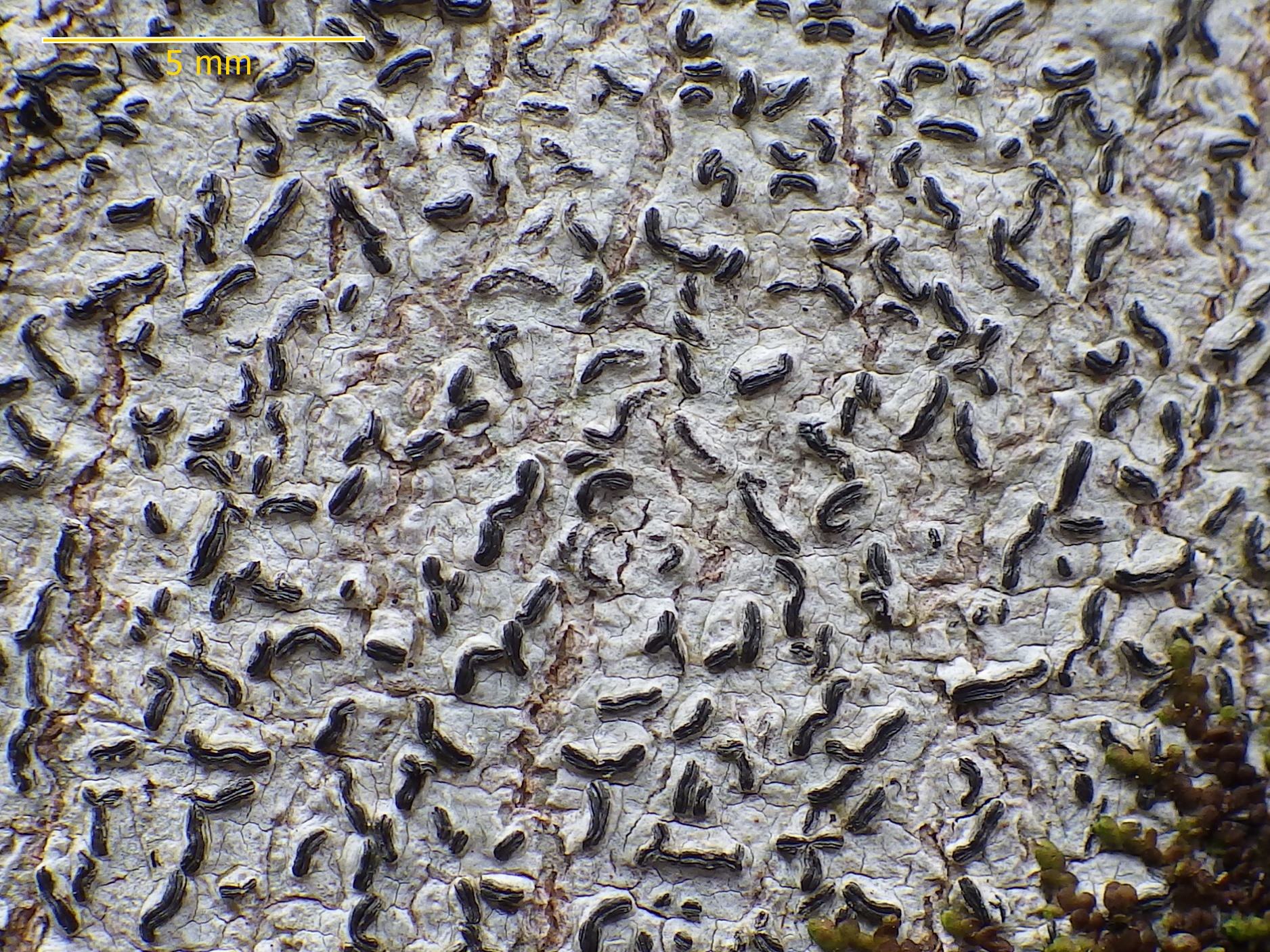
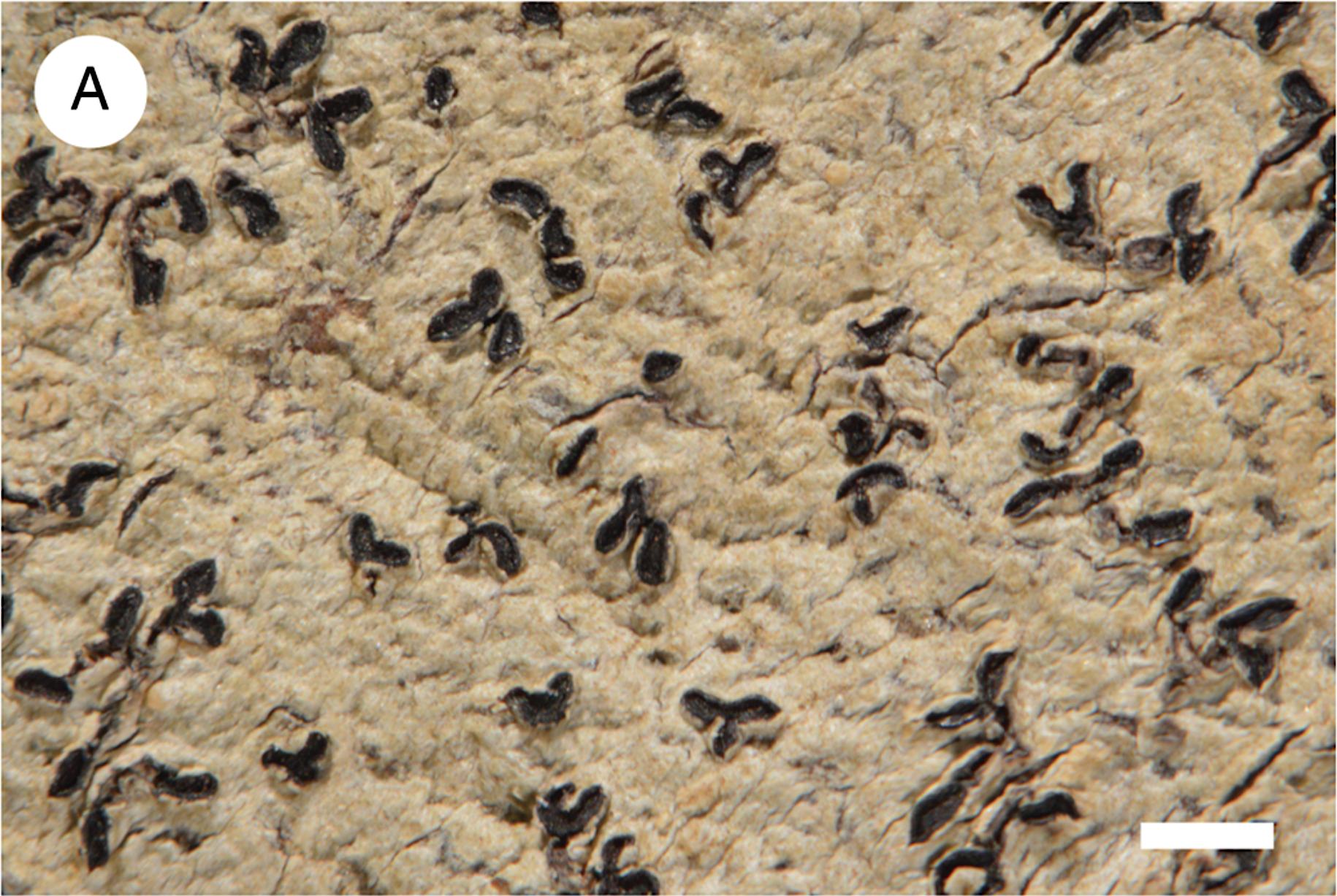
Allographa leptospora (left) and Mangoldia bylii—two script lichens once placed in Graphis but reassigned after multi‑gene analyses showed their similar slit‑like lirellae evolved independently, prompting a finer, lineage‑based recircumscription of Graphidaceae.

Integrative, multi-locus studies have prompted major revisions of several lichen families and genera. Two examples illustrate the impact of these studies: the re-circumscription of the family Graphidaceae and of the family Ramalinaceae.

Graphidaceae—the script lichen family—contains more than 2,000 mostly tropical species. Traditional taxonomy centred on fruiting body shape and a few microscopic characters. A five-locus phylogeny (Rivas-Plata and Lumbsch 2011) showed that many characters had evolved convergently. Slit-like versus rounded discs arose repeatedly, so genera built on those traits mixed unrelated species. Molecular results led to a wholesale recircumscription: several traditional genera were divided and new ones erected to reflect monophyletic clades. For instance, the broad Graphis was split into several smaller, genetically and chemically homogeneous genera. This process was facilitated by projects such as Ticolichen (a tropical lichen inventory project) which combined fieldwork, morphology, chemistry, and DNA sequencing to tackle these revisions. The outcome is a more natural scheme: genera now align with monophyletic clades, even when outwardly dissimilar species must be grouped together. The revision greatly increased recognized genera and species, exposing hidden diversity in tropical crustose lichens.

Another major revision, in this case of a mostly temperate/tropical group, was carried out by Kistenich and colleagues (2018) on the family Ramalinaceae. The family had about 40 genera of uncertain affinity, several delimited by only one or two traits. Their study analysed five loci from 149 species. The phylogeny identified monophyletic versus polyphyletic genera. For instance, Bacidia in its broad traditional sense was polyphyletic, as was Toninia and a few others. Character mapping suggested an ancestor with a filamentous thallus in moist shade and multi-septate spores. Traits like the phyllopsoroid growth form (tiny leaf-like squamules as in genus Phyllopsora) were found to have evolved repeatedly within the family. Guided by these results, the authors synonymized six genera, resurrected four, and described two new ones, publishing 49 new combinations. In total, they published 49 new combinations to assign species to the appropriate genus under the new scheme. The redefined family now comprises 39 genera grouped into five well-supported clades (sometimes informally called the Bacidia group, Ramalina group, named after representative genera). Aligning genera with clades improves identifications because traits now track evolutionary affinity. These large‑scale revisions exemplify the kind of evidence‑rich approach—multiple loci, morphology and broad sampling—that Nimis had earlier promoted as a prerequisite for accepting new genera. In both cases, an evidence-rich, collaborative approach (combining multiple DNA markers with morphology and broad sampling) led to a more natural and stable classification.

=== Cryptic species and species delimitation ===
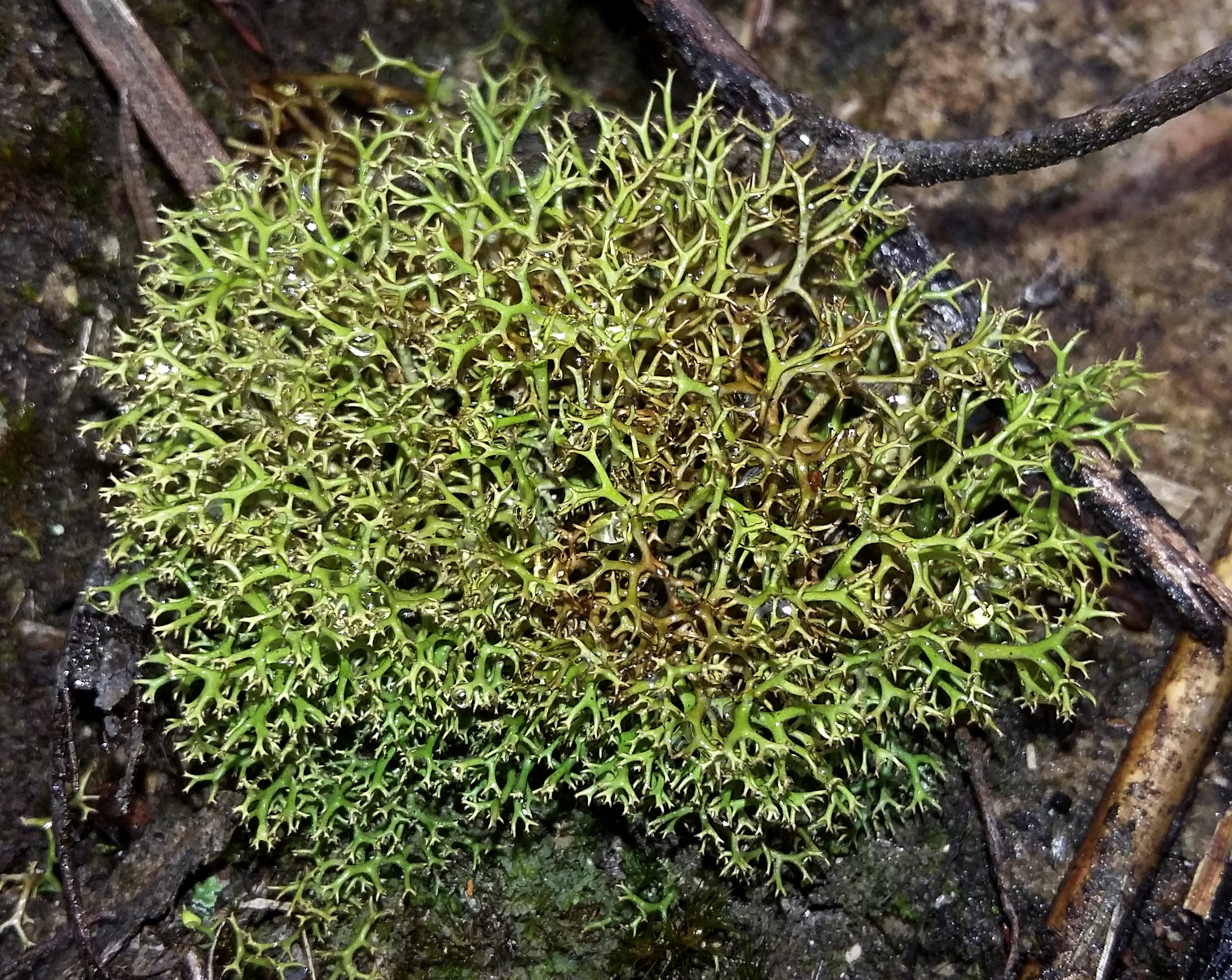
Cladia aggregata, long considered one pantropical morphospecies, has been split into ≈ 11 cryptic lineages by multilocus DNA work

Molecular studies have revealed an unexpectedly large number of cryptic lichen species. Cryptic species are genetically distinct yet morphologically similar to other species. Because many lichens differ only subtly in form or chemistry, they harbour extensive cryptic diversity. Lumbsch and Leavitt (2011) termed this a paradigm shift: morphology alone often fails to delimit species. They reviewed numerous examples across lichenology. In the large foliose lichen genus Xanthoparmelia, eight morphospecies were merged after DNA showed they formed a single lineage. Conversely, lookalike Xanthoparmelia thalli fell into several distinct lineages, increasing species counts. Genetic work on the pantropical Cladia aggregata complex uncovered at least 11 distinct species within what had been treated as one.

A phylogenomic survey of the cosmopolitan granite‑dweller Lecanora polytropa pushed this pattern to the extreme, recovering up to 75 evolutionarily independent lineages within what had long been treated as a single species—about a seventy‑fold jump in recognized diversity. Such cases show that traditional concepts both lumped and split species incorrectly. Characters like growth form, colour, or the presence/absence of sexual structures (such as whether a lichen reproduces by spores or is sterile and reproduces only asexually by fragments) were often over-weighted and do not always track evolutionary lineages. For instance, lichenologists long recognized species pairs where one species is fertile (has apothecia) and a very similar one is sterile but has abundant vegetative propagules such as soredia or isidia. Classical "species-pairs"—for example, fertile Parmelia saxatilis versus sorediate P. sulcata—have proven to be single species exhibiting alternative reproductive modes. DNA data have therefore prompted many merges, where differences were superficial, and still more splits, where hidden lineages emerged.

Lichenologists now rely on integrative taxonomy and modern delimitation tools to resolve species limits. Current practice combines genetic, morphological, and ecological evidence when defining species. Lücking, Leavitt, and David Leslie Hawksworth (2021) proposed a "Lichen Unified Species Concept" that weighs three evidence lines: Lineage (genetic divergence), Phenotype (morphology/chemistry), and Reproduction (isolation)—the LPR framework. A robust species is one that forms a well-supported clade, shows consistent phenotypic differences from relatives, and exhibits some reproductive barrier. Complete evidence is rare; the aim is concordance among whatever data are available. The authors also framed taxonomy in terms of errors: false positives (over-splitting) and false negatives (over-lumping). Morphology alone risks false positives; a single gene alone risks false negatives. Modern practice therefore often involves an iterative process: field lichenologists may initially distinguish entities by appearance ("morphospecies"), then genetic analysis (often multilocus) is used to test those hypotheses, merging or splitting as needed. Others invert the sequence: barcode data first reveal genetic clusters, which are then searched for overlooked diagnostic traits ("L then P"). Either way, multiple evidence lines—rather than their order—are the requirement.

Coalescent-based models now estimate how many genetic lineages in a lichen group merit species rank. The models incorporate incomplete lineage sorting and ongoing gene flow. Results usually recognize more species than morphology alone, suggesting widespread cryptic speciation. A purely genetic approach can oversplit when it treats every population divergence as a new species. Lücking and colleagues (2021) warn that genome-scale data make every population diagnosable; genetic structure must therefore be interpreted biologically to avoid a proliferation of trivial taxa. They advocate pairing genetics with quantitative phenotype data (morphometrics, metabolite profiles) to test discontinuities and confirm genuine species boundaries.

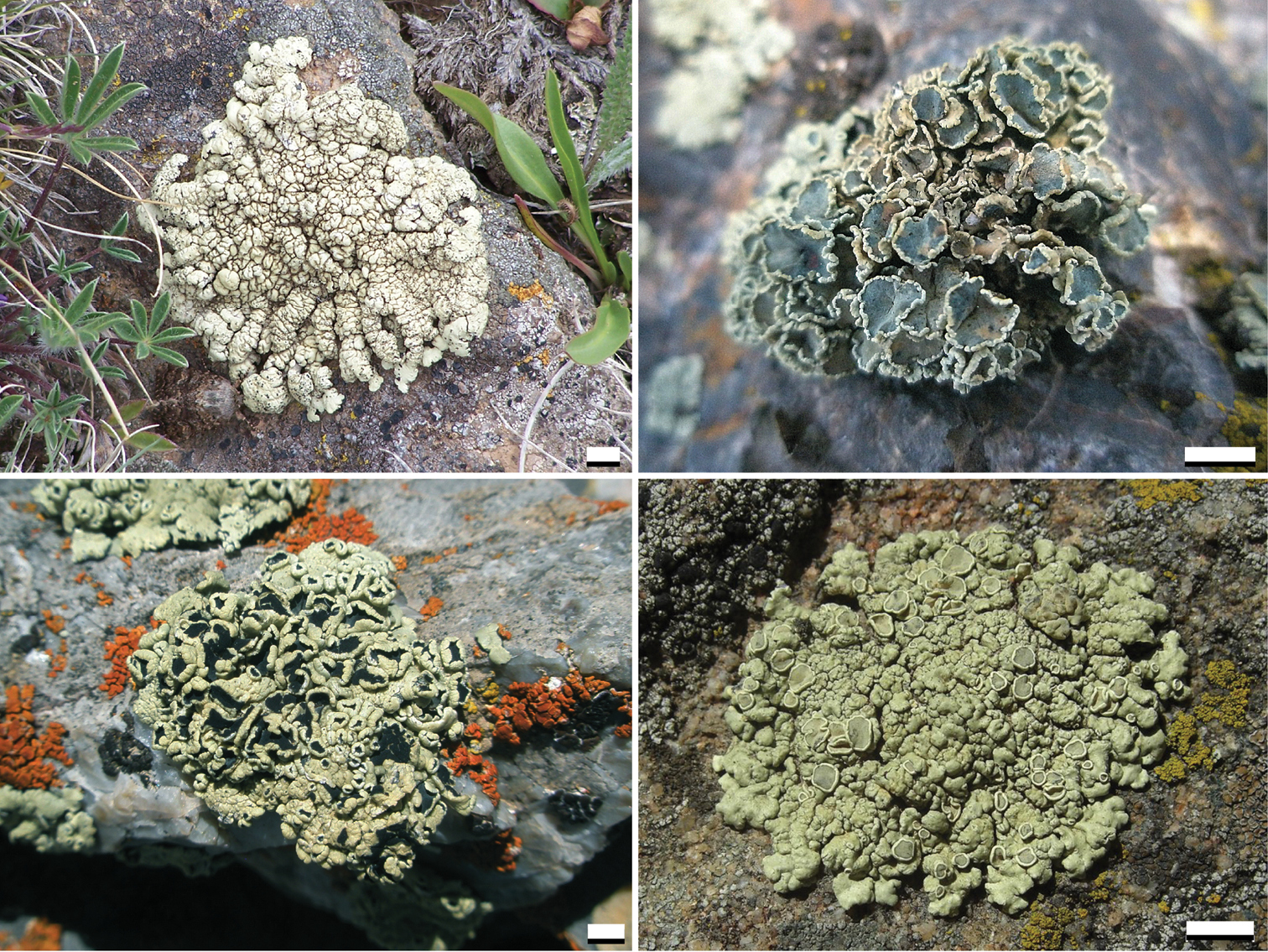
The "rock-posy", Rhizoplaca melanophthalma, once thought to be a single, widespread morphologically variable species, is now known to comprise a species complex.

The Rhizoplaca melanophthalma complex (rock-posy lichens) illustrates this complexity. Formerly treated as one circumpolar species with variable forms, the group is now recognized as several genetically distinct but partly hybridising species. Keuler and colleagues (2020) used genome-scale data and detected at least three historic hybridisation events. Network analysis showed that one lineage, Rhizoplaca shushanii, arose from hybridisation between R. melanophthalma and R. parilis and that low-level gene flow still occurs among some lineages. The hybrids lineages have unusual traits: R. shushanii is an alpine endemic with a distinct appearance, and two other lineages that were involved in introgression (gene flow between species) (R. haydenii and R. arbuscula) are vagrant forms that do not attach to rock but blow around on soil and reproduce only asexually. The study found discordance between nuclear and mitochondrial DNA trees (mitochondria from one species had introgressed into another), and the authors suggest that hybridization events might be linked to the loss of sexual reproduction and the evolution of these unusual, unattached growth forms. Systematically, the case shows that species boundaries can be porous and that reticulate evolution must be tested—single-locus barcodes can mislead when hybridisation is present. It also shows why relying on a single genetic locus (such as the ITS barcode alone) can be misleading: different genes in the same organisms have different histories if hybrids are involved. Because genome-wide data still separate the lineages, they remain distinct species even though their history cannot be depicted by a simple bifurcating tree. Keuler and colleagues recommend routine hybridisation tests (e.g., gene-tree comparison, HybridDetective) in intensive delimitation projects. Overall, such studies highlight how cryptic and dynamic lichen species can be, and they continue to drive up recognized species numbers.

=== Integrative approaches and the holobiont concept ===
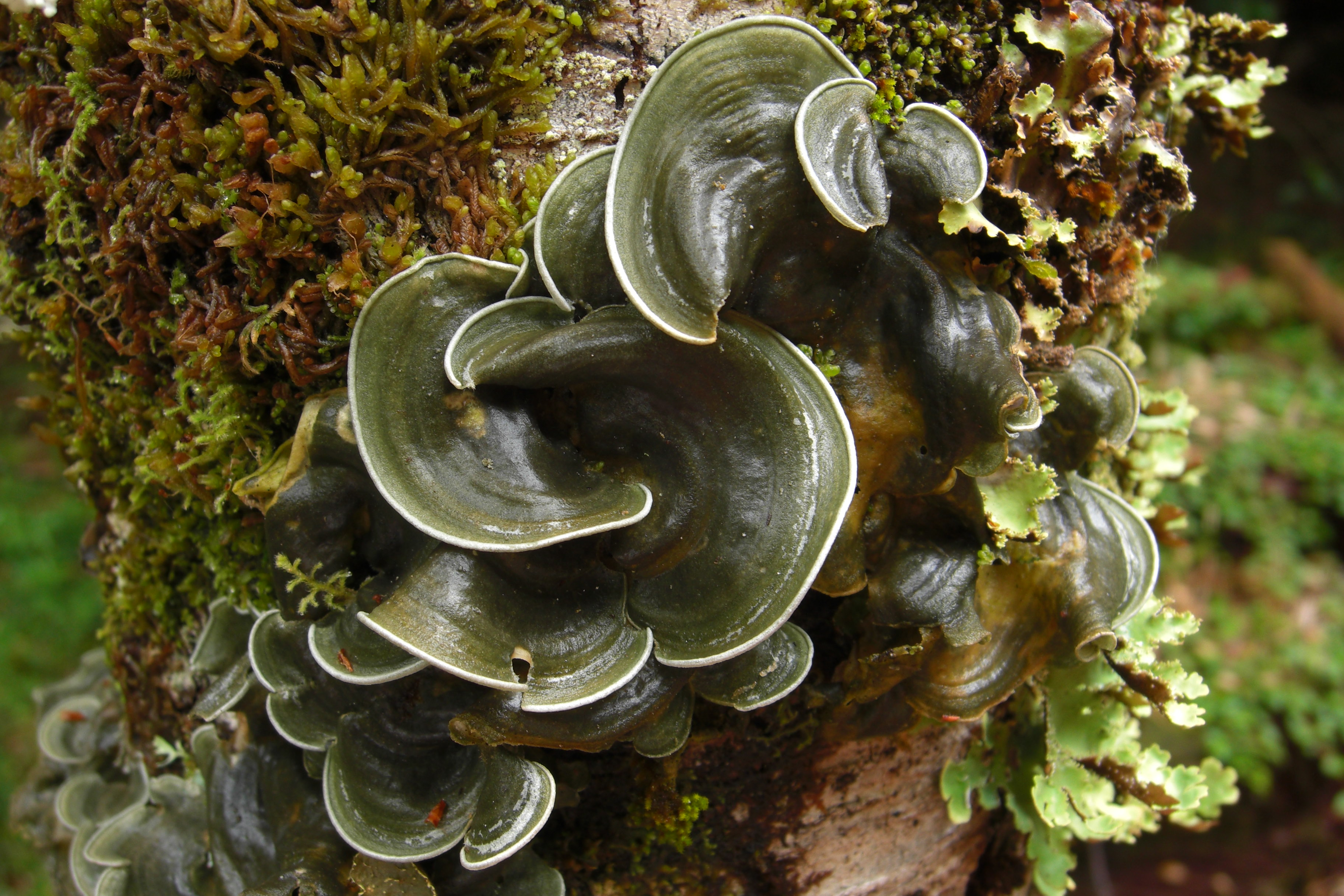
Cora glabrata, member of a now large basidiolichen genus

Current systematics views lichens as holobionts—mini-ecosystems made of many organisms. The basidiolichen Cora, once a single wide-ranging species, was split into 189 species after a morphology-plus-multilocus study—an example of how integrative data expose cryptic diversity. Work now tracks not only the fungus–alga pair but also the bacteria, archaea, and secondary fungi that shape lichen form and function. Metagenomic surveys show that a single thallus can host hundreds of microbial taxa; for instance, more than 800 distinct bacterial operational taxonomic units (OTUs) were recorded from the common foliose lichen Lobaria pulmonaria. Many associates fix nitrogen, recycle nutrients, or deter pathogens.

Alphaproteobacteria—chiefly Rhizobiales—usually dominate lichen microbiomes and contribute amino acid and vitamin synthesis. Community profiles shift with habitat. Rock lichens carry more Acidobacteria, whereas marine forms host more Bacteroidota and Chloroflexota. Archaea, including ammonia-oxidisers and methanogens, are consistently present, so all three domains of life participate in the consortium. These additional partners are not passive occupants; experiments show they respond to the lichen's physiological state. During wet-drying cycles, the microbial community shifts gene expression. In wet conditions, genes for nutrient transport and metabolism in bacteria are upregulated, while stress-response and energy-storage pathways become activated when dry. These patterns indicate a metabolically coordinated, multi-partner community of bacteria and other microbes, rather than a simple fungus–alga pair.

Lichens are now framed as holobionts—multi-partner units on which selection may act. Taxonomically, however, only the fungal partner is named under the ICN; the holobiont as a whole is not ranked. By convention and by the International Code of Nomenclature (ICN) rules, each lichen is formally referred to by the fungus's name. Consequently, a single fungus can form contrasting "photomorphs" with different photobionts. Historically, photomorphs were often misclassified as separate species or varieties. Many photomorphs were once misdescribed as separate taxa; molecular work on Lecanographa amylacea showed its algal and cyanobacterial forms belong to one fungus. Article F.1.1 (one fungus, one name) mandates a single valid name; informal tags such as "cyanomorph" or "green morph" may be added descriptively. To communicate the difference, lichenologists might append informal qualifiers, such as Lobaria pulmonaria cyanomorph and green morph, but these are not separate taxa. Proposals to rank photomorphs formally (e.g., as formae) gained little traction because the variants reflect ecology, not lineage. In practice, photomorphs are an aspect of intraspecific variability. Situations of optional lichenization (where a fungus can live either as a lichen or independently) complicate matters. The same Stictis fungus can form a lichen when algae are present (it was formerly classified in a separate lichen genus, Conotrema) or live as a saprobe (decay organism) when absent—yet in both cases it retains the same Latin name. These cases underscore that the mycobiont is the nomenclatural unit; the lichen is its ecological expression. The holobiont lens nonetheless shifts research toward how fungal–algal–microbial associations evolve. Topics such as photobiont switching—common among closely related Trebouxia strains but rare between major algal lineages—are tested for links with adaptation and speciation. Photobiont flexibility — a fungus's ability to switch algal partners — appears to vary. Many lichen-forming fungi can pair with multiple algae of the same general type (for example, different strains of Trebouxia, a genus of green algae). However, switching to a completely different type of algal partner (say, from a green alga to a cyanobacterium) is much rarer, and often coincides with a major evolutionary shift in the lichen.

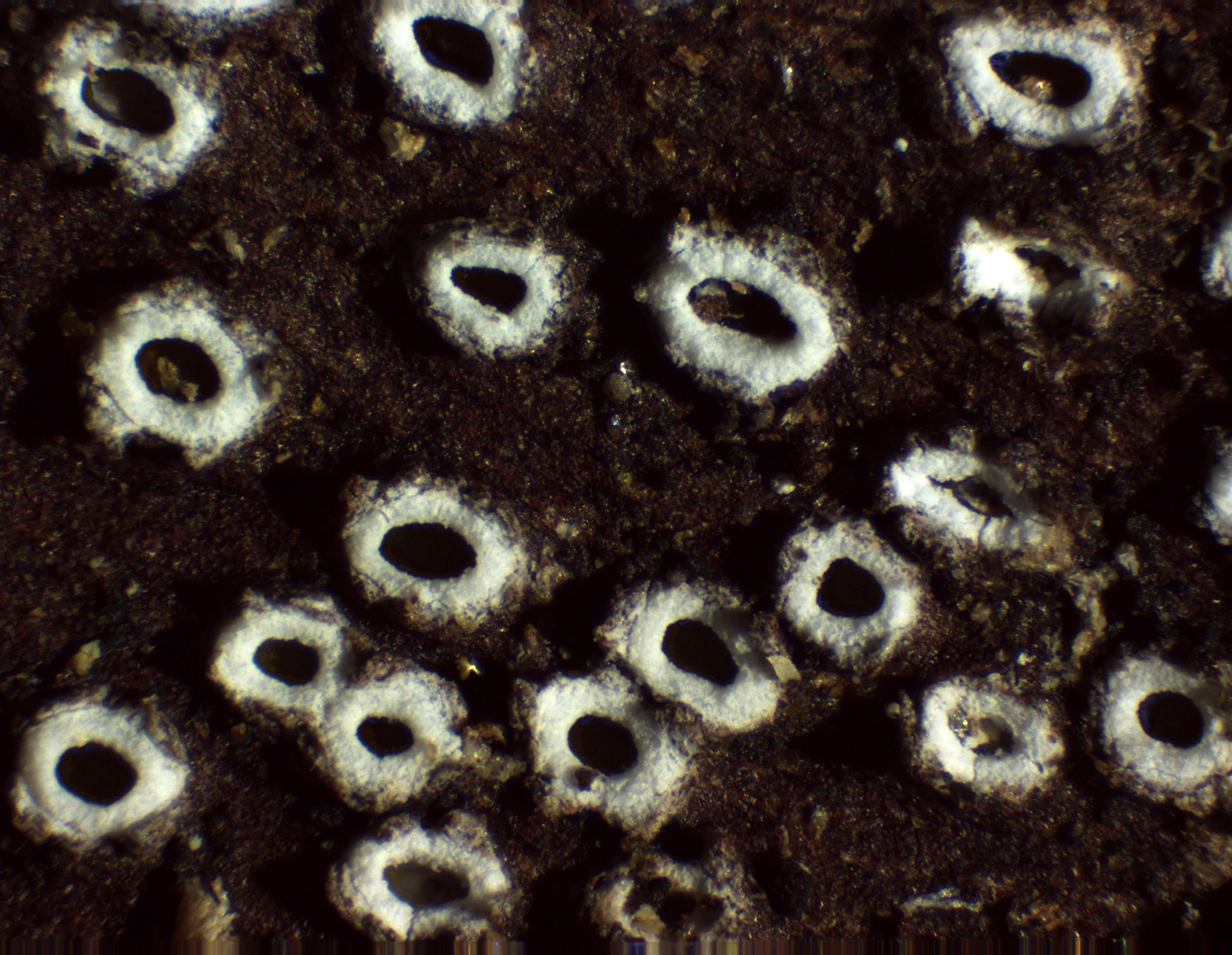
Fruiting bodies of Stictis radiata growing saprobically on bark; some members of this fungal genus can partner with algae to form a lichen, which were formerly classified in a separate genus, Conotrema.

Integrative approaches have led to new computational tools for lichen identification. PhyloKey, for example, combines phylogenetics with traditional identification methods by placing unknown specimens onto reference phylogenetic trees using morphological, chemical, and optional molecular data. Unlike traditional dichotomous keys, it can process hundreds of specimens simultaneously and flag potential new species. Machine learning approaches are also emerging, with experimental studies using neural networks to identify lichens from photographs or predict metabolite patterns from genetic sequences. While these tools remain in development, they illustrate the field's movement toward more quantitative and automated identification methods that could accelerate biodiversity surveys and conservation work.

Integrative lichen systematics views each lichen species as a network of interactions—fungus, photobiont(s), and microbiome—all of which can be studied to provide a fuller understanding of the organism. While taxonomic names are based on the fungal partner, the biological reality involves that the expression of that fungus (its morphology, its success in an environment, its evolution into new forms) is often shaped by a community of other organisms. This holistic perspective does not replace the fundamentals of classification but enriches them and ensures that lichenologists remain attuned to the ecological and evolutionary context of the species they classify.

== Ongoing challenges and future directions ==
Despite the advances in technology and theory, lichen systematics faces several challenges as it moves forward, ranging from practical issues of workforce and resources to conceptual debates about how we define and name species.

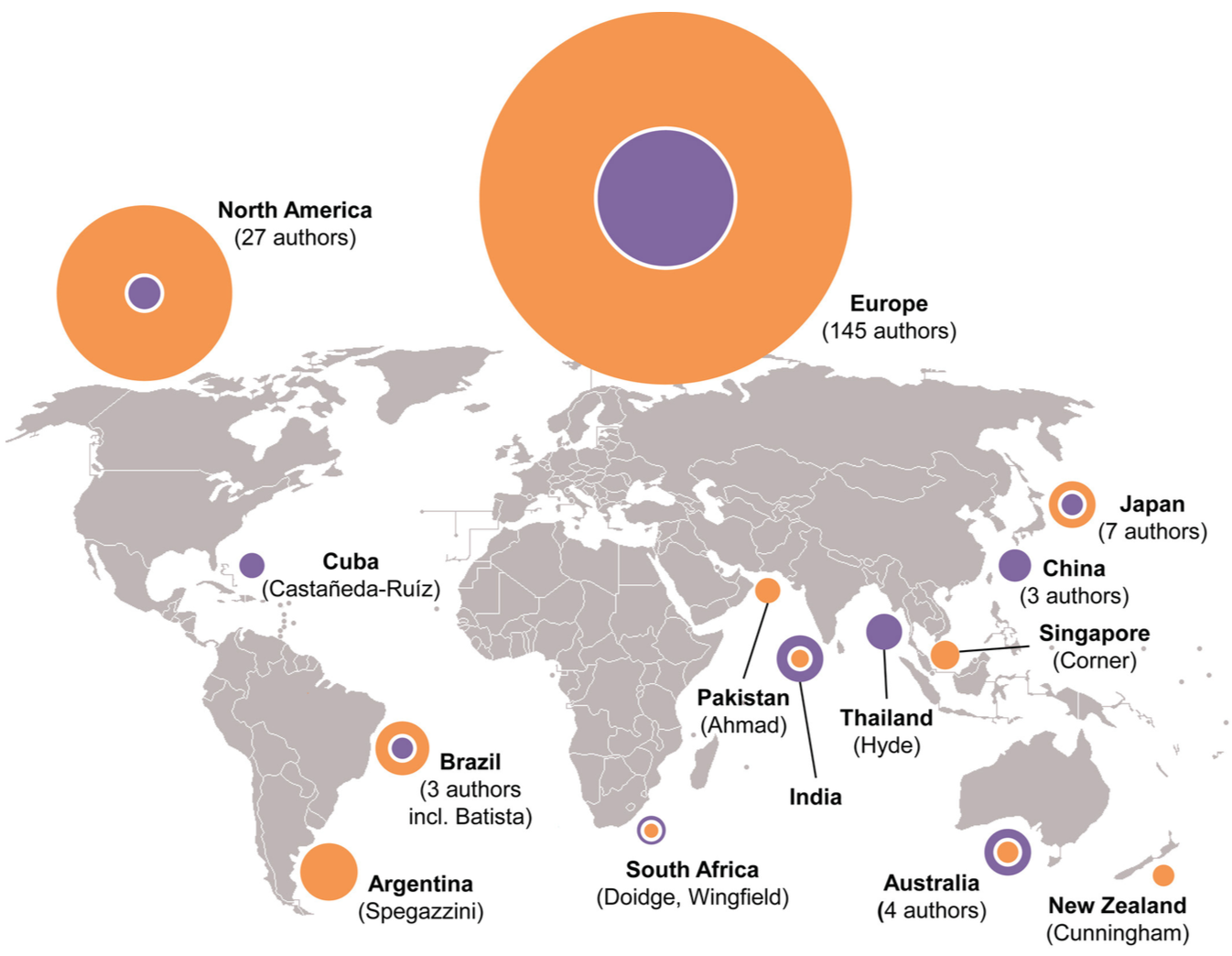
Global distribution of the 200 most prolific fungal taxonomists. Circle area is proportional to the number of species each author has named (Index Fungorum data, cut‑off December 2017). Orange circles mark historic and recently deceased authors (75% of the total); purple circles mark currently active authors (25%). The map depicts the long‑standing concentration of taxonomic effort in Europe and North America and the comparatively sparse coverage in biodiversity‑rich tropical regions.

The taxonomic workforce remains insufficient for documenting lichen diversity. Lendemer (2021) found that only 14% of lichen-related research papers published in 2018–2020 included taxonomic work, while Lücking (2020) estimated that the current community of lichen taxonomists is only a fraction of what would be needed for a complete inventory. Expertise is particularly lacking in biodiversity-rich tropical regions where most undescribed species likely occur. However, infrastructure improvements are helping address these gaps. Since 2012–2013, mandatory registration of new fungal names in repositories like MycoBank has been widely adopted, with over 97% of new lichen species from 2018 to 2020 properly registered. Additionally, citizen scientists using platforms such as iNaturalist increasingly contribute to species discovery when collaborating with professional taxonomists.

Nomenclatural challenges arise as lichen systematics increasingly encounters cryptic species. Environmental DNA studies reveal numerous uncharacterized fungal lineages, including potential lichenicolous fungi, but ICN rules require physical type specimens for species description. This creates difficulties for documenting diversity found only in environmental samples. The community generally discourages naming taxa known only from sequences to avoid proliferating dubious names. A related concern is taxonomic inflation—the risk that genomic data could lead to naming every population variant. Lücking and colleagues (2021) emphasize distinguishing real species from minor variants with differing allele frequencies or subtle sequence divergence. These issues reflect the balance between scientific progress and maintaining a practical, stable nomenclature for ecological and conservation work.

The LPR framework is one attempt to impose a higher bar: requiring evidence of reproductive isolation or ecological differentiation, not just genetic distinctness, to call something a new species. Additionally, nomenclatural stability is an ongoing issue. When molecular studies reorder relationships, it often necessitates changes in genus or family assignments. The 2016 global lichen classification (and its 2017 update) made hundreds of such changes to align names with phylogeny. They noted that fully half of all lichen genera had to be moved to a different family or order compared to the previous decade's understanding. These scientifically justified changes can be disruptive for end-users like ecologists or land managers who suddenly have to learn new names for familiar organisms. The challenge for systematists is to communicate these changes clearly and perhaps even temper the pace of renaming by holding off until results are strongly corroborated. Some stability measures (like proposing nomenclatural conservation of widely used names even if they are technically nested in another group) can mitigate the impact on the broader community. In lichenology, where many genera are small (the average genus has approximately 19 species, and a quarter of genera are monospecific), changes at genus level can particularly cause fragmentation. Discussions continue on how best to balance the need for monophyletic groups with the practical need for taxa that are reasonably diagnosable and useful. Nimis's five‑point checklist, although written for generic splits, provided an early blueprint for balancing lineage evidence with the practical need for taxonomic stability.

Emerging technologies offer new tools for lichen systematics. Long-read sequencing is making it feasible to assemble complete genomes of lichen fungi and their photobionts, providing extensive character data and resolving complex structural variants. Environmental metagenomics can detect lichen DNA in soil and air samples, potentially allowing surveys of overlooked microlichen diversity. Machine learning models show promise for identifying lichens from photographs and detecting patterns in multidimensional datasets. However, these technologies require robust reference databases and high-quality baseline taxonomy to be effective. As Lücking (2020) notes, incomplete or flawed taxonomy will simply be perpetuated more rapidly by automated systems. The principle of the "minimum adequate method" remains relevant—traditional methods like culture experiments and careful morphological observation continue to answer questions that sequencing alone cannot. Echoing this caution, Divakar and Crespo emphasise that maximum‑likelihood pipelines such as RAxML and Bayesian frameworks (e.g., MrBayes, BEAST) give the most dependable results only when their outputs are compared side by side and underpinned by formal model testing; over‑interpreting a single, untested method can yield artefactual trees.

== See also ==
- Lichen biogeography
