= Rhizoplaca parilis =

Scientific classification
- Kingdom: Fungi
- Division: Ascomycota
- Class: Lecanoromycetes
- Order: Lecanorales
- Family: Lecanoraceae
- Genus: Rhizoplaca
- Species: R. parilis

Binomial name
- Rhizoplaca parilis S.D.Leav., Fern.-Mend., Lumbsch, Sohrabi & St.Clair (2013)

Species of lichen

Rhizoplaca parilis is a crustose lichen in the family Lecanoraceae. Described in 2011, it was separated from the Rhizoplaca melanophthalma complex after molecular studies showed it forms an independent evolutionary lineage. It typically forms tightly attached, rosette-shaped growths with radiating lobes and a yellow-green surface, often featuring a dark, glossy centre when fruiting bodies are present. R. parilis occurs on exposed siliceous rock from about 2,000 metres up to 3,500 metres in habitats ranging from pinyon–juniper woodland to alpine tundra across North America, Europe, Asia and South America.

== Taxonomy ==
Rhizoplaca parilis was formally described in 2011 by Steven Leavitt, Félix Fernández-Mendoza, H. Thorsten Lumbsch, Mohammad Sohrabi and Larry St Clair from material collected on basalt at 2,875 m (9,432 ft) elevation on Thousand Lake Mountain, Utah. Molecular work that analysed several nuclear and mitochondrial loci resolved the species as "clade IVb" within the Rhizoplaca melanophthalma complex. Both the combined gene tree and a species-delimitation test strongly support treating it as a separate lineage. Although the internal transcribed spacer (ITS) sequences of known specimens differ by only about 0.3%, they are more closely related to each other than to any other member of the complex. Phylogenetically, R. parilis forms part of a well-supported clade that also contains R. occulta, R. polymorpha, R. porterii and the obligately unattached vagrant species R. haydenii and R. idahoensis. The epithet parilis (Latin for 'similar') refers to the close outward resemblance between the new taxon and several others in the genus.

The species is chemically distinctive within the complex because it alone may produce orsellinic, lecanoric and gyrophoric acids, although the presence and relative abundance of these secondary metabolites vary markedly among individuals. Genetic sampling includes confirmed vouchers from the western United States and from several localities in both Eurasia and South America, each bearing the same multilocus signature despite their geographical spread.

== Description ==
Thalli of Rhizoplaca parilis usually form tightly attached, placodioid rosettes that can be mistaken for R. melanophthalma: they have radiating lobes with slightly up-turned tips, an upper surface suffused with yellow-green usnic acid, and a dark, often glossy disc when apothecia (fruiting bodies) are present. Minute features such as lobe width, marginal crenulation (scalloping) or pruina provide no reliable separation from lookalike taxa. Instead, identification rests on a combined assessment of chemistry and DNA sequence data. Thin-layer chromatography typically reveals usnic and psoromic acids as major constituents, accompanied by constipatic, dehydroconstipatic and dehydroprotocetraric acids. Many thalli also contain lecanoric and orsellinic acids in significant quantities, while gyrophoric acid and several O-demethylated derivatives appear sporadically. No single metabolite profile is diagnostic, but the suite involving orsellinic-series compounds is otherwise unknown in the complex.

Superficially the lichen presents as a compact crust; however, rare collections possess slightly looser margins that suggest an incipient tendency toward a vagrant life-form. The photobiont is a green alga of the genus Trebouxia. Microscopic examination shows one-celled ascospores typical of the genus, but these fall within the range of dimensions reported for allied species and therefore offer little taxonomic utility.

== Habitat and distribution ==
Rhizoplaca parilis colonises exposed, nutritionally poor siliceous rocks—basalt, granite and schist are frequent substrates—yet it also tolerates calcium-rich sandstones and limestones. In North America the species occupies ecological zones from pinyon–juniper woodland through montane conifer forest to the lower fringes of alpine tundra, generally at elevations between about 2,000 and 3,500 m (6,600 and 11,500 ft). Overseas material has been gathered in analogous settings across Central Asia, western China, parts of Europe and the Andean cordillera, indicating a broad circumpolar to temperate distribution. In 2021, R. parilis was recorded on James Ross Island in the Antarctic Peninsula, where it was found growing near nutrient-enriched bird nesting sites. In 2023 it was reported from northern Pakistan.

The lichen favours fully insolated rock faces where melt-water or summer thunderstorms supply intermittent moisture. Its scattered records suggest that it may be common in suitable microhabitats yet overlooked because of its close resemblance to members of the R. melanophthalma aggregate.
