= Rhizoplaca ouimetensis =

Conservation status
- Critically Imperiled (NatureServe)

Scientific classification
- Kingdom: Fungi
- Division: Ascomycota
- Class: Lecanoromycetes
- Order: Lecanorales
- Family: Lecanoraceae
- Genus: Rhizoplaca
- Species: R. ouimetensis

Binomial name
- Rhizoplaca ouimetensis Brinker, Evankow & Timdal (2022)

Species of lichen

Rhizoplaca ouimetensis is a saxicolous (rock-dwelling), crustose lichen species in the family Lecanoraceae. Uniquely identified by its sorediate form—a feature not observed in other Rhizoplaca species—it was discovered in Ontario, Canada, specifically within the Ouimet Canyon Provincial Park.

== Taxonomy ==
The lichen was formally described in 2022 as a new species by Sam Brinker, Ann Evankow, and Einar Timdal. The type specimen was collected by the first author from the base of a canyon in Ouimet Canyon Provincial Park, where it was found growing on vertical faces of boulders among moss-covered talus. Plants in the area included stunted individuals of Picea mariana, Betula papyrifera, and Alnus alnobetula ssp. crispa. The species epithet refers to the type locality. Later molecular phylogenetics analysis placed the species as a member of "clade II", a grouping of Rhizoplaca species with bluish-black, rarely yellowish discs with a distribution mostly in North America.

== Description ==
Rhizoplaca ouimetensis has a crustose thallus that is made up of areoles (small, angular sections) that can spread irregularly to cover diameters of several centimetres. Each areole can measure up to 2 mm in diameter and may be rounded or slightly irregular in shape. These areoles are typically convex to bullate (blister-like) or pulvinate (cushion-shaped), occasionally presenting a minutely shield-like (peltate) appearance. Their colouration is a greenish yellow with a glossy finish, and their surface is smooth without any powdery (pruinose) covering.

Soralia, structures that produce reproductive powdery granules called soredia, are bright yellow and emerge from the areoles' surface. They can be individual or partially merged. The soredia themselves are approximately 80 to 150 μm in diameter. Neither a hypothallus or prothallus was observed.

The upper cortex of the thallus, the outer protective layer, has a thickness of 50 to 60 μm, including a very thin outermost layer (epinecral layer). This cortex is made up of densely branched, mostly vertically aligned (anticlinal) hyphae, which are fungal filaments with thin walls and short cylindrical spaces inside (lumina). These hyphae contain crystals that dissolve in potassium hydroxide (K). No remnants of algae are found within this layer. Directly beneath the cortex, the algal layer is continuous, 50 to 65 μm thick, and is composed of unicellular green algae, each up to 15 μm in diameter.

The medulla (the inner layer beneath the algal layer) is white and contains crystals that do not dissolve in potassium hydroxide but do dissolve in 25% sulfuric acid (H_{2}SO_{4}), leading to the precipitation of needle-shaped crystals, indicative of calcium oxalate. No observations were made of apothecia (fruiting bodies that produce spores) or pycnidia (structures that produce asexual spores), which are often present in lichen species for reproduction. All standard chemical spot tests are negative in this species. Thin-layer chromatography (TLC) analysis shows the lichen contains usnic acid and angardianic/roccellic acid. These two fatty acids cannot be separated using TLC, and therefore they are referred to collectively.

=== Similar species ===
Rhizoplaca ouimetensis shares morphological characteristics with several species of Lecanora, making it potentially confusing to differentiate. In particular, it resembles sorediate, saxicolous species of Lecanora that are yellow-green due to the presence of usnic acid. In North America, similar species include Lecanora brodoana, L. chloroleprosa, L. jamesii, and L. orosthea. European counterparts with similar traits are L. handelii and L. soralifera. Additionally, Lecanora epanora and L. subaurea may appear similar but are distinguishable by their deeper yellow pigmentation, attributed to epanorin and/or rhizocarpic acid, unlike the pale yellow usnic acid found in R. ouimetensis.

The thallus of these Lecanora species tends to form a more continuous crust or areolate pattern, differing from the pulvinate or minutely shield-like (peltate) areoles characteristic of R. ouimetensis. Another distinctive feature of R. ouimetensis is its well-developed upper cortex and a medulla densely packed with calcium oxalate crystals, setting it apart from the aforementioned Lecanora species. Except for L. jamesii, which also contains usnic acid along with 2-O-methylsulphurellin, atranorin, and chloroatranorin, the other Lecanora species include zeorin in addition to yellow pigments and possibly other compounds, further differentiating them from R. ouimetensis.

== Habitat and distribution ==
Rhizoplaca ouimetensis is found exclusively in the Lake Nipigon ecoregion of Thunder Bay District, growing on exposed, near-vertical diabase sills amidst a boreal forest backdrop. Its presence is restricted to areas with a specific microclimate characterized by cool, humid air flows. Given its limited known occurrences and specific habitat requirements, Rhizoplaca ouimetensis is suspected to be rare throughout its range.
