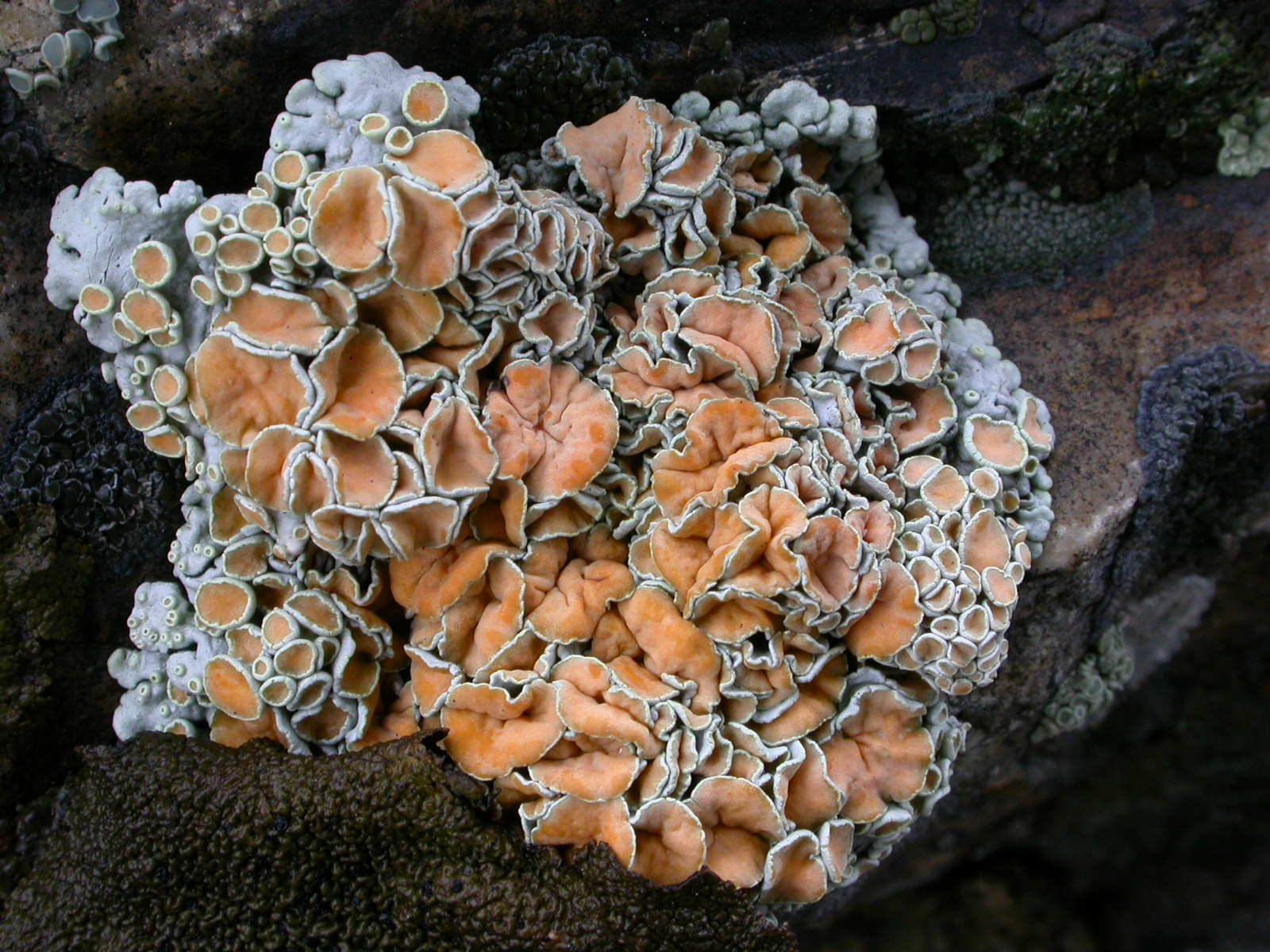

Conservation status
- Secure (NatureServe)

Scientific classification
- Kingdom: Fungi
- Division: Ascomycota
- Class: Lecanoromycetes
- Order: Lecanorales
- Family: Lecanoraceae
- Genus: Rhizoplaca
- Species: R. chrysoleuca

Binomial name
- Rhizoplaca chrysoleuca (Sm.) Zopf (1905)

Synonyms
- Lichen chrysoleucus Sm. (1791)

= Rhizoplaca chrysoleuca =

Species of fungus

Rhizoplaca chrysoleuca (orange rim lichen, rock-posy lichen, rockbright) is a pale yellowish-green to gray-green umbilicate foiliose lichen in the Lecanoraceae (rim lichen) family. It was first described in 1791 by English botanist Sir James Edward Smith as Lichen chrysoleucus; Friedrich Wilhelm Zopf transferred it to the genus Rhizoplaca in 1905.

The single-leaf (monophyllous) umbilicate thallus can be 2–3.5 cm in width, with deep lobes. The thallus is relatively thick and lumpy with warts and lobules. The fruiting structures (apothecia have lightly pruinose, burnt-orange to tan discs rimmed, with a contrasting rim of pale greenish thallus-like tissue making them easy to identify. Apothecia are 0.8–2.5 mm diameter, and often numerous and crowded into each other.

It grows in Eurasia and western North America. In the Sonoran Desert region it grows at elevations from 1,200 to 3,200 metres (3,900 to 10,500 ft). It prefers siliceous rock, granite, schist, quartz, mica, and basalt, but is also found on sandstone and less commonly on calcareous rock. It grows from the high desert to the alpine zone. It is often nitrophilous, preferring dropping areas under bird perches. It is common on rock in inland arid mountain and desert habitats in California.

Lichen spot tests are K+ yellow or K−, KC+ yellow-orange, C−, and P− on the cortex, and K−, KC+ red or KC−, C−, and P+ yellow or P− on the medulla.
