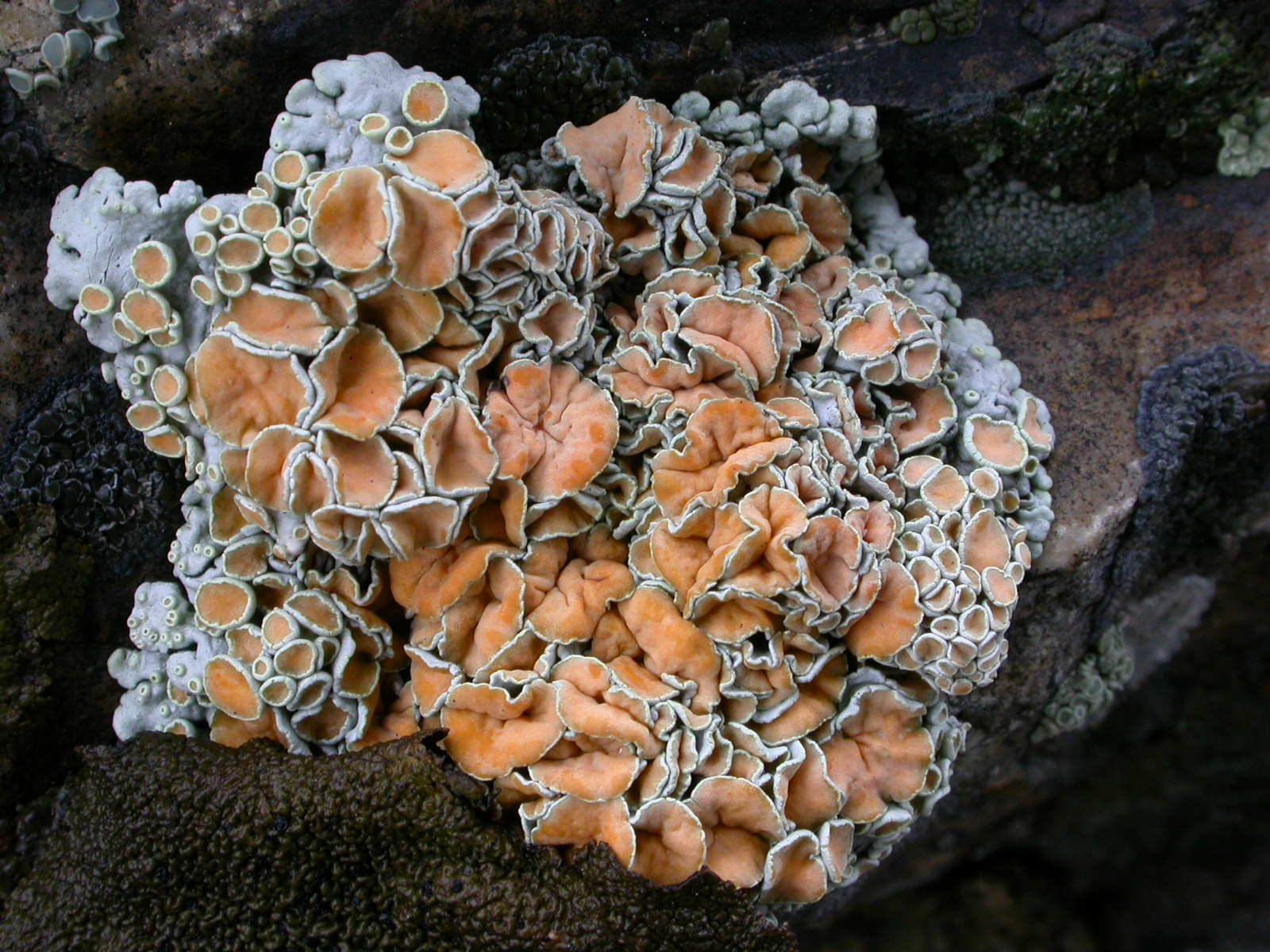
- Rhizoplaca chrysoleuca

Scientific classification
- Domain: Eukaryota
- Kingdom: Fungi
- Division: Ascomycota
- Class: Lecanoromycetes
- Order: Lecanorales
- Family: Lecanoraceae
- Genus: Rhizoplaca; Zopf (1905)

Type species
- Rhizoplaca opaca (Ach.) Zopf (1905)

Synonyms
- Omphalodina M.Choisy (1929)

= Rhizoplaca =

Genus of lichen-forming fungi

Rhizoplaca is a genus of lichenized fungi in the family Lecanoraceae. Members of the genus are commonly called rimmed navel lichens because of their umbilicate growth form and lecanorine (rimmed with thallus-like tissue)apothecia, also rock-posy lichen and rockbright.

== Species ==
As of August 2023, Species Fungorum (in the Catalogue of Life) accepts 17 species of Rhizoplaca:

- Rhizoplaca arbuscula (Rosentr.) Rosentr., St.Clair & Leavitt (2019)
- Rhizoplaca callichroa (Zahlbr.) Y.Y.Zhang (2020)
- Rhizoplaca glaucophana (Nyl.) W.A.Weber (1979)
- Rhizoplaca haydenii (Tuck.) W.A.Weber (1979)
- Rhizoplaca idahoensis Rosentr. & McCune (2007)
- Rhizoplaca melanophthalma (DC.) Leuckert & Poelt (1977)
- Rhizoplaca nigromarginata (H.Magn.) S.D.Leav., Zhao Xin & Lumbsch (2015)
- Rhizoplaca novomexicana (H.Magn.) S.D.Leav., Zhao Xin & Lumbsch (2015)
- Rhizoplaca occulta S.D.Leav., Fern.-Mend., Lumbsch, Sohrabi & St.Clair (2013)
- Rhizoplaca opaca (Ach.) Zopf (1905)
- Rhizoplaca ouimetensis Brinker, Evankow & Timdal (2022)
- Rhizoplaca pachyphylla (H.Magn.) Y.Y.Zhang (2020)
- Rhizoplaca parilis S.D.Leav., Fern.-Mend., Lumbsch, Sohrabi & St.Clair (2013)
- Rhizoplaca polymorpha S.D.Leav., Fern.-Mend., Lumbsch, Sohrabi & St.Clair (2013)
- Rhizoplaca porteri S.D.Leav., Fern.-Mend., Lumbsch, Sohrabi & St.Clair (2013)
- Rhizoplaca shushanii S.D.Leav., Fern.-Mend., Lumbsch, Sohrabi & St.Clair (2013)
- Rhizoplaca weberi (B.D.Ryan) S.D.Leav., Zhao Xin & Lumbsch (2015)
