= Rhizoplaca polymorpha =

Scientific classification
- Kingdom: Fungi
- Division: Ascomycota
- Class: Lecanoromycetes
- Order: Lecanorales
- Family: Lecanoraceae
- Genus: Rhizoplaca
- Species: R. polymorpha

Binomial name
- Rhizoplaca polymorpha S.D.Leav., Fern.-Mend., Lumbsch, Sohrabi & St.Clair (2013)

Species of lichen

Rhizoplaca polymorpha is a species of crustose lichen in the family Lecanoraceae.
