= Vagrant lichen =

Lichen that grows without a substrate

A vagrant lichen is a lichen that is either not attached to a substrate, or can become unattached then blow around, yet continue to grow and flourish. Some authors reserve the expression "vagrant lichen" for those lichens that never attach, that is, those that are obligately vagrant, referring to vagrant forms of other species as "erratic lichen". Vagrant lichens generally occur in open and windswept habitats, all over the world, in all kinds of temperature zones. Habitats include saltbush (mallee) vegetation zones in Australia, steppes of Eurasia, Arctic tundra, and the North American prairie. They range from the low elevations of the Namib Desert to the high-altitude Andean páramo. There are under 100 identified vagrant species, most commonly in the Aspicilia and Xanthoparmelia genera.
