= Lecanora nohedensis =

Scientific classification
- Kingdom: Fungi
- Division: Ascomycota
- Class: Lecanoromycetes
- Order: Lecanorales
- Family: Lecanoraceae
- Genus: Lecanora
- Species: L. nohedensis

Binomial name
- Lecanora nohedensis Cl.Roux & M.Barbero (2011)
- Type locality: Nohèdes, France

Species of lichen-forming fungus

Lecanora nohedensis is a species of crustose lichen in the family Lecanoraceae. It has an extremely reduced thallus consisting of scattered pale greenish granules, each bearing one or a few small disc-like fruiting structures. The species is unusual in being a parasite, growing on the lichen Placopyrenium breussii. It is known only from two localities in the eastern Pyrenees of southern France.

== Taxonomy ==
Lecanora nohedensis was described as a new species in 2011 by the lichenologists Claude Roux and Mercedes Barbero, based on material collected during an inventory of lichens in and around the nature reserve of Nohèdes (Pyrénées-Orientales, southern France). The specific epithet refers to Nohèdes, the locality where the lichen was discovered.

The species was placed in the Lecanora polytropa group because of its more or less green thallus and apothecia and its production of usnic acid. It is set apart from other saxicolous members of this group by a combination of characters: an extremely reduced thallus, small spores (mostly about 8–10 × 5–6 μm), a chemistry including usnic and stictic acid derivatives, and an unusual lifestyle as a parasite on Placopyrenium breussii (itself parasitic on Circinaria calcitrapa). The holotype was collected on 30 July 2009 from non-calcareous schist near Nohèdes at about 1,030 m elevation.

In the field, the species may be mistaken for very young forms of Lecanora muralis with a strongly reduced thallus, but those are consistently without apothecia, are not parasitic, and have a different chemistry (including zeorin but lacking stictic acid).

== Description ==
The thallus (lichen body) is extremely reduced, consisting of scattered granules or small clusters of granules that are pale greenish to whitish and about 0.05–0.4 mm across. These granules develop on the thallus of Placopyrenium breussii and often contain one to three developing apothecia (the disc-like fruiting bodies).

Apothecia are usually few and measure about 0.4–1.1 mm across. They begin immersed in the granules but soon break through and become lecanorine in form (with a thallus-like rim). The disc is pale greenish-brown and may become greyish or brownish with age, while the thick, white thalline margin is about 0.1–0.25 mm wide and typically dull rather than glossy.

Microscopically, the asci are 8-spored, and the spores are colourless, single-celled, and ellipsoid, typically (7)8–10(12) × 5–6(6.5) μm, often with one or two oil droplets. Pycnidia are rare. When present, they produce thread-like conidia about 19.5–29 × 1 μm. In spot tests, the thallus cortex is K+ (yellow), C−, KC+ (yellow), and P− or weakly P+; in some apothecia the epithecium shows an N+ reaction, turning deep blue and then purple. Thin-layer chromatography detected usnic acid as the major secondary metabolite, with stictic, cryptostictic, and constictic acids in smaller amounts.

== Habitat and distribution ==
Lecanora nohedensis grows on inclined to subvertical faces of non-calcareous schist that is only weakly acidic. The known sites are very sunny and dry but exposed to rainfall, in a warm, dry (xerothermic) low-elevation hilly setting. It occurs within a schist community characterised by Aspicilia calcitrapa and Pertusaria chiodectonoides, where it develops as a parasite on Placopyrenium breussii.

As of its original description, the species was known only from two localities in the Pyrénées-Orientales: the type area near the Nohèdes reserve (about 1,030 m elevation) and a second site in the Jujols reserve roughly 10 km to the south (about 1,025 m).

== See also ==
- List of Lecanora species
