= Wings for My Flight =

Book by Marcy Cottrell Houle

Wings for My Flight: The Peregrine Falcons of Chimney Rock
- Cover of the 1991 edition
- Author: Marcy Cottrell Houle
- Subject: Environmental protection
- Genre: Non-fiction
- Set in: Chimney Rock, Colorado; 1975
- Published: 1991 (Addison-Wesley)
- Publication place: United States
- Pages: 188
- Awards: Oregon Book Award; Christopher Award
- ISBN: 0-87108-897-5
- Dewey Decimal: 598.9

Wings for My Flight: The Peregrine Falcons of Chimney Rock is a book by American wildlife biologist Marcy Cottrell Houle. Wings for My Flight documents Houle's observations of a pair of the then-endangered peregrine falcons at Chimney Rock, a prominent rock formation in Colorado, while employed by the Colorado Division of Wildlife in the summer of 1975. To protect the falcons, Houle had to halt a million-dollar project to turn ancient Anasazi ruins in the area into a tourist attraction and faced opposition and harassment by the Chimney Rock community as a result.

By 1975, peregrine falcons had been reduced to 324 pairs in North America, primarily as a result of DDT, a widely used pesticide. DDT lowered estrogen levels in female peregrines and inhibited the production of calcium, causing eggs to thin and break during incubation. Recovery efforts for the peregrine falcon have been remarkably successful: agricultural DDT was banned by the U.S. in 1972 and efforts to breed and train peregrine falcons in captivity to later release to the wild were effective. In 1999, the peregrine falcon was removed from the U.S. Endangered Species list.

Wings for My Flight was originally published in hardcover by Addison-Wesley in 1991. The book was republished in 1999 by Pruett Publishing with a foreword by Robert Michael Pyle and a new preface and epilogue by Houle. The book was updated again in 2014 and republished by the University of New Mexico Press with photographs and a preface by Houle touching upon the recovery of the peregrine falcon. The book was republished again in 2026 by the University of Nebraska Press with a new afterword. In May 1996, the children's magazine Cricket published a short story written by Houle titled "Albert", adapted from Wings for My Flight. Reception to Wings for My Flight has generally been positive. The book co-received the Oregon Book Award in 1991 and received a Christopher Award for books in 1992.

== Background ==
Marcy Cottrell Houle wrote Wings for My Flight in the decades following a major decline in the peregrine falcon population, which occurred between 1950 and 1970. During the 1930s and 1940s, an estimated 1000 breeding pairs of peregrine falcons inhabited the western United States and Mexico, coupled with 500 pairs in the eastern U.S. By the 1970s, no peregrine falcons were discovered east of the Rocky Mountains, and in the west, peregrine falcon populations had declined by 80 to 90 percent. By 1975, the year in which the events of Wings for My Flight take place, only 324 pairs of peregrine falcons were known to reside in North America, with only seven pairs in the Rocky Mountains region, and one at Chimney Rock, a prominent rock formation in southwestern Colorado.

During the peregrine falcon decline, Houle studied biology at Colorado College in Colorado Springs. The institution's block scheduling system meant that Houle had fewer classes each day, allowing her to travel frequently to experience various ecosystems in addition to her academic studies. Upon leaving college, Houle began working for the Colorado Division of Wildlife, and her first field assignment was to observe peregrine falcon activity along the Rocky Mountains for four summers, two of which were spent at Chimney Rock. Following her experience with the peregrine falcons, Houle had to decide whether to continue pursuing wildlife biology or to commit instead to her passion of writing. Wings for My Flight combined both of Houle's interests; it recounted her observations of the peregrines as well as her interaction with the community at Chimney Rock during her first summer there.

The peregrine falcon became an endangered species primarily due to the use of organochlorine pesticides, especially DDT, the breakdown of which lowered estrogen levels in the bloodstream of female peregrine falcons and inhibited the production of calcium, causing eggs to grow thinner by up to 20 percent. Since peregrine falcons lay their eggs on rocky ledges rather than nests, the thinned shells would break under the stress of both the rocky ledge and the weight of the parents during incubation. Following 1970, recovery efforts for the peregrine falcon population have been successful. The agricultural use of DDT was banned in the United States in 1972, and recovery teams in the eastern United States were successful in breeding and training peregrines in captivity to later release to the wild, a procedure called hacking. In 1999, the peregrine falcon was removed from the U.S. Endangered Species list.

== Content summary ==
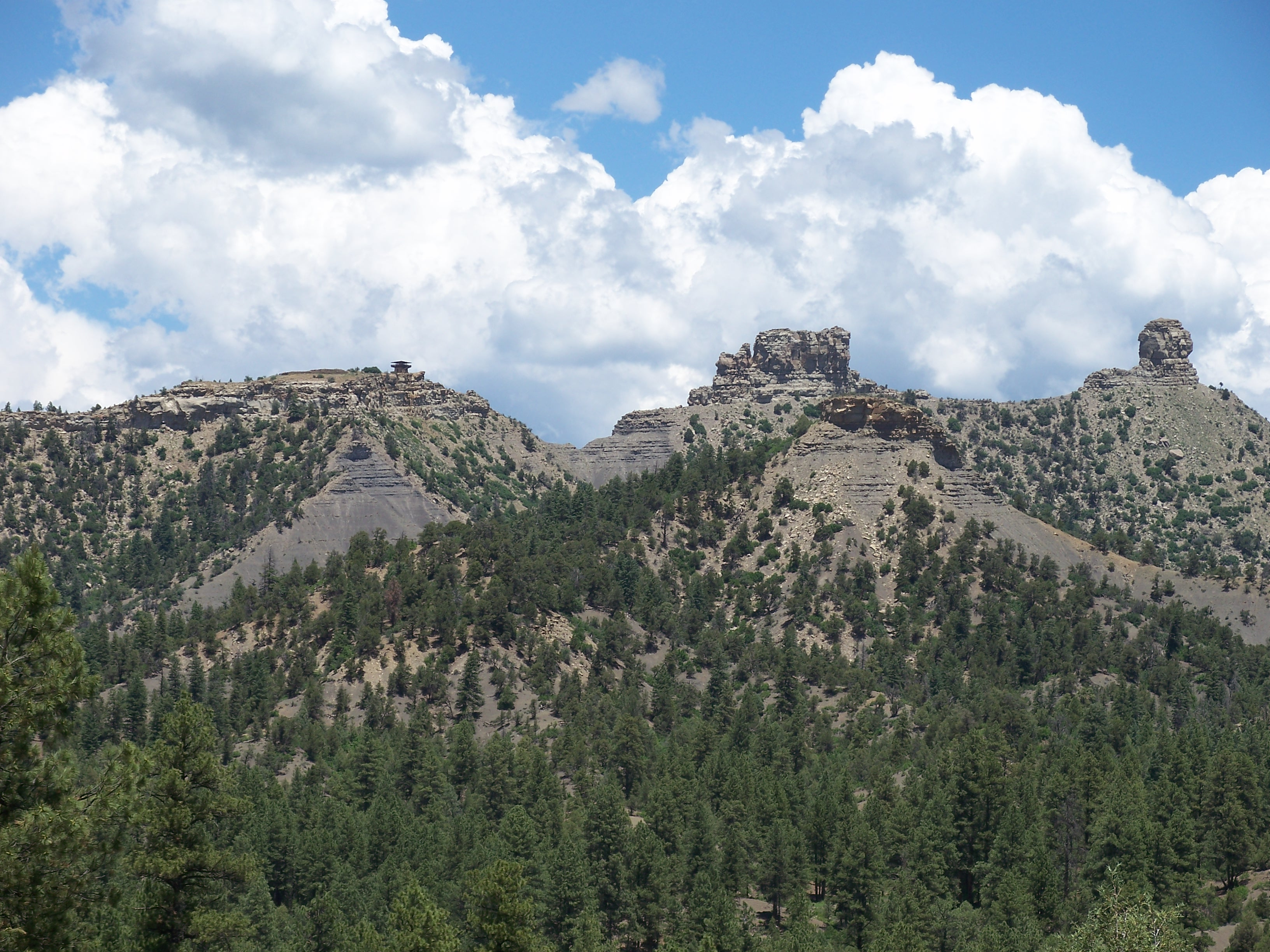
Chimney Rock (far right), a prominent geological rock formation in Colorado where the majority of the book's events took place, photographed in 2010

The events of Wings for My Flight take place throughout 1975. While writing the book, Houle changed the names of various people and places, later explaining the choice by saying, "I felt more comfortable changing the names because I worked for so long with those people, it was impossible to be honest about them if I named them".

Marcy Cottrell Houle (then "Marcy Cottrell"), a 21-year-old wildlife biologist, is sent by her supervisor, Barry Layne, to the U.S. Forest Service office near Chimney Rock in Colorado, where a pair of peregrine falcons reside. The pair is one of only seven pairs remaining in the Rocky Mountains region. Mr. Preston Fitch, an administrator involved with the peregrine falcon project, criticizes Houle for her lack of experience in the field upon meeting her. Nevertheless, Mr. Fitch introduces Houle to Chimney Rock. He explains that the Forest Service spent more than half a million dollars building a road which led to Chimney Rock; work on the road had to be discontinued upon discovery of the falcons. Further, the Chimney Rock area is home to 250 Anasazi ruins dated between 900 and 1100. The Chimney Rock community had been planning a million-dollar development to build a tourist attraction for the ruins. Houle spends several weeks with the peregrine falcons, recording her observations in her notebook. In spite of her initial attempt at maintaining an impersonal relationship with the falcons, Houle names the female peregrine "Jenny" and the male "King Arthur". In the middle of June, after Houle had spent several days of making field observations alone and with limited equipment, Mr. Fitch introduces Houle to her teammate, Alex Porter. He also provides them with a garbage truck for transportation.

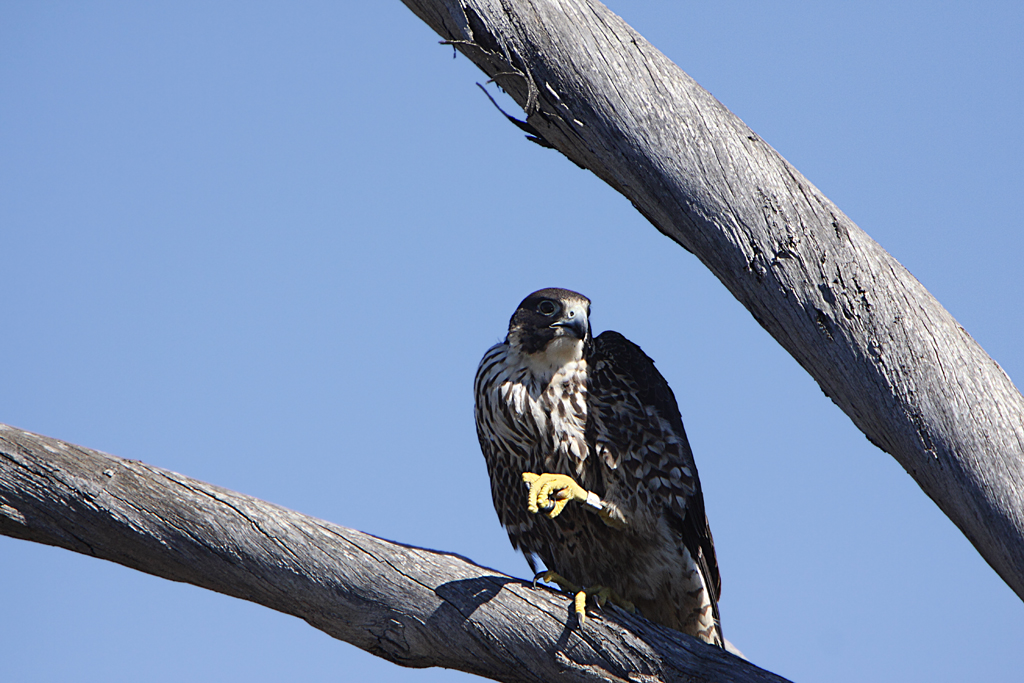
A juvenile American peregrine falcon (Falco peregrinus anatum), the same species as the ones observed by Houle at Chimney Rock, photographed in California, 2008

Meanwhile, Houle faces indignation and harassment from the residents of the Chimney Rock community, who view her presence as impeding the progress of the construction of a tourist attraction for the Anasazi ruins. At one point, Maurice Richards, a high-ranking official of the Colorado Division of Wildlife, attempts to host a picnic on an area restricted for the peregrines. When Houle forces him to leave, Richards threatens to fire her. Later, the female peregrine, Jenny, disappears and never returns. A local resident claims she was shot and killed by a member of the Chimney Rock community.As a result of Jenny's disappearance, King Arthur spends several days ignoring the hatchlings that they had been raising. After this period of "grief", King Arthur begins to raise the young falcons singlehandedly. Following this, Houle discovers that of five nestlings hatched by the pair, only two received enough food to survive. Houle names the surviving pair of nestlings "Bold Leopold" and "Albert" after their distinct personalities; Leopold was more courageous and was always the first to try new things, such as flying, whereas Albert was more hesitant. In spite of all the attempts to intimidate her, the people of Chimney Rock eventually sympathize with Houle after her trailer, containing valuable field equipment as well as personal items, is broken into and vandalized.

== Publication history ==
Wings for My Flight was first published in 1991 in hardcover by Addison-Wesley. Houle later wrote a short story titled "Albert" that was adapted from Wings for My Flight, focusing on Albert and Leopold's first attempts at flying. The story was published in the May 1996 issue of the children's magazine Cricket. Wings for My Flight was republished, this time in paperback, in 1999 by Pruett Publishing. This edition included a foreword by Robert Michael Pyle and a new preface and epilogue by Houle.

In 2014, the book was updated and republished again by University of New Mexico Press. The updated edition contained photographs of the Chimney Rock landscape, as well as a preface by Houle that addressed the recovery of the peregrine falcon population since the book was first published in 1991. Houle highlighted the 1972 agricultural prohibition of DDT, which was the chemical primarily responsible for the peregrine decline; the Endangered Species Act of 1973, which allowed the pursuit of wildlife conservation to take precedence over land issues; and successful attempts to raise peregrines in captivity and later release them to the wild. The book was republished again in 2026 by the University of Nebraska Press with a new afterword written by Houle. The afterword discusses the recovery of the peregrine falcon but also remarks on the endangerment of the Endangered Species Act itself in light of attempts to render the Act's protections against habitat destruction less effective.

== Reception ==
Wings for My Flight was generally well received. In 1991, the book received the Oregon Book Award for literary nonfiction, co-receiving the award with My Country, My Right to Serve by Mary Ann Humphrey. The Oregon Book Award, presented annually by Literary Arts, a non-profit organization that promotes literature, intends to recognize the works of Oregon-based authors in a variety of literary genres. Additionally, in 1992, the book received a Christopher Award, which is presented annually by The Christophers, a non-profit Christian inspirational group, and recognizes creators of books, motion pictures, and television specials that "affirm the highest values of the human spirit".

Dolores and Roger Flaherty wrote a positive review in the Chicago Sun-Times, noting how "Houle blends elements of adventure, romance, humor and pathos in the story of her rookie summer as a wildlife biologist. Along the way she offers vivid descriptions of her skydiving subjects and the seductive beauty of the wilderness." David M. Schwartz, in the May 1992 edition of Smithsonian, praised Houle's prose in Wings for My Flight, and wrote that the story is "told with a charming simplicity in fewer than 200 pages". Schwartz also praised Houle for including her notational system for documenting field observations, stating that it "opens a window on field biology". Writing in the Library Journal, Henry T. Armistead referred to the book as "well crafted and compelling, a dramatization of the classic conflict between the legitimate interests of conservationists and developers", and, "highly recommended on several levels, as science, sociology, or a story". Andrew Gulliford, a professor of history and environmental studies at Fort Lewis College, noted in The Durango Herald the significance of Houle's efforts to prevent "inappropriate development" at Chimney Rock, which was proclaimed a U.S. National Monument by President Barack Obama in 2012. "Wings for My Flight is a personal story", wrote Gulliford, "but also a chronicle of environmental success. Without a doubt, peregrines saved Chimney Rock for the rest of us."

Freehance writer Paul De Witte wrote a mixed review in The Record (now the Waterloo Region Record), writing that although the book "will certainly find its audience, its Disneyesque sensibilities will kill its broader appeal. The topics of wildlife conservation and global ecological accountability warrant a depth that the author seems unwilling to give her book." Kirkus Reviews referred to the book as "an enlightening cautionary take" and "a charmingly personal account", but also as "loosely organized and occasionally sparse on detail". John Wilkes, in the Los Angeles Times, wrote, "Although naive and overdrawn at times, this heartfelt tale will bring tears and smiles to even the most stubbornly objective reader." Donna Mitchell, writing in The Wilson Bulletin (now The Wilson Journal of Ornithology), wrote that Houle's interpretation of the falcons' behavior is excessively "anthropomorphic", but also that "Ms. Houle's perseverance and dedication to the protection of the Peregrine Falcon is admirable and an incentive not only to young biologists just getting started but to those of us who get a little more than discouraged with the struggle to protect endangered species and their habitats."
