= Marcy Cottrell Houle =

American writer and wildlife biologist

Marcy Cottrell Houle (born August 1, 1953) is an American writer and wildlife biologist. She lives in Portland, Oregon.

== Life and career ==
Marcy Houle is a fifth-generation Oregonian, the daughter of George (a prominent orthopedic surgeon) and Margaret Cottrell. When she was born, her family lived on 13 acres (5.3 ha) of old-growth forest in southwest Portland. Her early interest in biology was fostered by exploring her own backyard, and she and her two sisters also traveled frequently to Vancouver Island and backpacked in Oregon forests.

Houle attended Colorado College in Colorado Springs, where she studied biology. She spent summers after college working for the Colorado Division of Wildlife studying peregrine falcons near Chimney Rock National Monument, an experience she documented in her 1991 book Wings for My Flight: The Peregrine Falcons of Chimney Rock. She married John Houle in 1982; they lived on Sauvie Island. After enrolling in Oregon State University to earn a master's in biology, she studied raptors on Zumwalt Prairie for the U.S. Fish and Wildlife Service, an experience she documented in her 1995 book The Prairie Keepers: Secrets of the Zumwalt. Her research there helped lead to the prairie becoming a nature preserve.

Houle's 30-year interest in Forest Park in Portland culminated in a wildlife and vegetation study that the Oregon Historical Society (OHS) published in 1988 as One City's Wilderness: Portland's Forest Park. OHS published a second edition of the book in 1996, and in 2010 Oregon State University Press published the third edition. The third edition includes maps of the park by cartographer Erik Goetze and images by photographers Gerry Carr and Lois Miller.

In addition to Wings for My Flight and One City's Wilderness, her publications include a third book, The Prairie Keepers: Secrets of the Zumwalt. Her work has also appeared in The Nature Conservancy Magazine, Reader's Digest, The New York Times, and other periodicals.

== Awards and honors ==
Wings for My Flight was awarded an Oregon Book Award for literary nonfiction in 1991, a Christopher Award in 1992, and the same year New York Public Library named the book one of the Best Books for the Teenaged.

The Prairie Keepers was named a Booklist Editor's Choice. It was also named an Earth Day Reader's Selection by The New York Times.

== Works ==
- One City's Wilderness: Portland's Forest Park (2010), [1996], [1988]
- Wings For My Flight: The Peregrine Falcons of Chimney Rock (1991)
- The Prairie Keepers: Secrets of the Zumwalt (1995)
- The Gift of Caring: Saving Our Parents from the Perils of Modern Healthcare (2015)
- A Generous Nature: Lives Transformed by Oregon (2019)
- Forest Park: Exploring Portland's Natural Sanctuary (2023)
- The Gift of Aging: Growing Older with Purpose, Planning and Positivity (2023)
