= Circinaria rogeri =

Scientific classification
- Kingdom: Fungi
- Division: Ascomycota
- Class: Lecanoromycetes
- Order: Pertusariales
- Family: Megasporaceae
- Genus: Circinaria
- Species: C. rogeri

Binomial name
- Circinaria rogeri (Sohrabi) Sohrabi (2012)
- Type locality: Zumwalt Prairie, Oregon

Synonyms
- Aspicilia rogeri Sohrabi (2011)

Species of lichen-forming fungus

Circinaria rogeri is a species of lichen in the family Megasporaceae. It is a vagrant lichen, meaning it grows unattached to any surface and is moved about by wind and water. The species forms small, shrubby clumps that are dull olive-green to yellowish-green. It occurs on calcareous soils in the sagebrush steppes of the western United States, where it has been recorded from Colorado, Idaho, Oregon, Utah, and Wyoming.

== Taxonomy ==
Aspicilia rogeri is a free-living vagrant lichen in the family Megasporaceae. It was described as a new species in 2011 by Mohammad Sohrabi and coauthors, based on western North American material that had often been identified as Aspicilia fruticulosa but differed in morphology and internal transcribed spacer DNA sequences. The specific epithet honors the ecologist Roger Rosentreter, who provided many of the specimens used in the study.

In a broader phylogenetic and taxonomic revision of the so-called "manna lichens" (vagrant and related forms), Sohrabi and colleagues concluded that vagrant and erratic species should be treated in the genus Circinaria, and they made the new combination Circinaria rogeri for this species. Under that treatment, no vagrant or erratic species remain in Aspicilia.

The type specimen was collected in 2007 in Wallowa County, Oregon, at the Zumwalt Prairie Nature Preserve, where it was found on barren, rocky calcareous soil in an ephemerally wet seepage area, about 1,380 m (4,530 ft) elevation.

== Description ==
The thallus is somewhat fruticose and forms unattached, shrubby clumps that are typically 0.5–2 cm (0.2–0.8 in) across. Branching is usually irregular (only rarely neatly forked), and the tips are often pale with a small blackened area where pycnidia are common. The surface is generally dull yellow-green to olive-green or olive-brown, sometimes gray-green, and pale pseudocyphellae (small, pale breaks in the surface) are usually most obvious toward the branch tips.

In cross-section, the cortex (outer "skin") is distinctly two-layered, with a thin outer layer of rounded cells and a thicker inner layer of elongated cells. Apothecia are uncommon. When present they are dark, often pruinose, and may become adnate to short-stalked, reaching about 2.5 mm in diameter. The ascospores are hyaline and simple, while the conidia are threadlike and typically about 7–16 μm long. No secondary metabolites were detected, and standard chemical spot tests are negative (K−, C−, KC−, P−).

== Habitat and distribution ==
Aspicilia rogeri is an obligatory vagrant on calcareous soils in open shrub-steppe. It favors sites that are briefly moist in winter or spring but dry for most of the year, and it has often been recorded at elevations of about 1,000–2,000 m (3,300–6,600 ft). It is associated with calcareous badlands landscapes, including habitats dominated by black sagebrush (Artemisia nova) and other Artemisia communities, and it may occur alongside other soil-crust lichens such as Aspicilia hispida.

The species is known from western North America, with published records from Colorado, Idaho, Oregon, Utah, and Wyoming. In their global review of manna lichens and relatives, Sohrabi and coauthors treated it as restricted to North America (in contrast to several related vagrant species that are widespread in Eurasia).
