= The Prairie Keepers =

1995 book by Marcy Cottrell Houle

- Cover of the 2007 updated edition
- Author: Marcy Cottrell Houle
- Subject: Ecology
- Genre: Non-fiction
- Set in: Zumwalt Prairie, 1979
- Published: 1995 (Addison-Wesley)
- Publication place: United States
- Pages: 266
- ISBN: 020160843X

The Prairie Keepers: Secrets of the Zumwalt (originally published as The Prairie Keepers: Secrets of the Grasslands) is a book by American wildlife biologist Marcy Cottrell Houle. Originally published in 1995, the book documents Houle's experience studying the unusually prevalent amount of raptors on the Zumwalt Prairie while researching for Oregon State University with a grant from the U.S. Fish and Wildlife Service in 1979.

== Publication history ==
The book was first published in 1995 by Addison-Wesley. Oregon State University Press published an updated version of the book in 2007 with a new epilogue by Houle that discusses additional research by a former classmate about the Zumwalt Prairie done in the time after the book was published.

== Reception ==
John Hughes, an employee of the U.S. Fish and Wildlife Service, wrote a review of the book's updated version that was published in The Quarterly Review of Biology in 2007. Hughes wrote that The Prairie Keepers was a "highly engaging account of a graduate research project that provides a wonderful mix of both personal and professional growth, and is written with powerful prose". Hughes also commented that "inclusion of some salient points could have improved the volume", but ultimately characterized these omissions as "small nitpicks" and that overall, The Prairie Keepers was "an entertaining treatment of the challenges associated with preserving wild places." Hughes suggested that the book "should be required reading for undergraduate wildlife biology students, as it paints an accurate picture of life as an agency biologist and exposes the pitfalls that professional bias can create".

Tim Markus, a librarian at Evergreen State College, wrote in a review published by Library Journal that The Prairie Keepers "reads in large part like a mystery with a dash of romance". Markus thought that "the book suffers from too many analogies and dialog that often sounds contrived", but ultimately concluded that "this is an interesting work that draws surprising conclusions and illustrates the difficulties and rewards off field research". In a review published in Rangelands, the journal of the Society of Range Management, Larry D. Butler, an employee of the U.S. Natural Resources Conservation Service, commented that Houle "his book won't let you put it down if you have a love for rangelands and an admiration for the people who own and manage them". Butler also wrote that Houle is able to convey her experience on the grasslands in "an understandable and especially personal way that opens the secrets for all to understand".
