= Circinaria calcitrapa =

Scientific classification
- Kingdom: Fungi
- Division: Ascomycota
- Class: Lecanoromycetes
- Order: Pertusariales
- Family: Megasporaceae
- Genus: Circinaria
- Species: C. calcitrapa

Binomial name
- Circinaria calcitrapa (Cl.Roux & A.Nordin) Cl.Roux (2024)
- Type locality: near Nohèdes, France

Synonyms
- Aspicilia calcitrapa Cl.Roux & A.Nordin (2011)

Species of lichen-forming fungus

Circinaria calcitrapa is a species of rock-dwelling crustose lichen in the family Megasporaceae. Described in 2011 from the Pyrénées-Orientales in southern France, it grows on inclined to vertical faces of non-calcareous schist in warm, dry, sun-exposed habitats from low elevations into the lower montane zone, and is easily confused with Aspicilia viridescens unless examined microscopically, but differs in having non-pruinose fruiting bodies, eight-spored asci, and smaller ascospores.

== Taxonomy ==
Aspicilia calcitrapa was described as a new species in 2011 by Claude Roux and Anders Nordin, based on material collected during surveys in protected areas of the Pyrénées-Orientales (southern France). The type specimen was collected near Nohèdes (Pyrénées-Orientales) at about 1,030 m elevation, growing on small faces of non-calcareous schist. The epithet calcitrapa is from Latin (French chausse-trappe, 'a trap'), and the authors note that without microscopic work the species is easily confused with A. viridescens. In the authors' ITS-based phylogeny, A. calcitrapa is placed close to A. aquatica (a species with a very different, more water-associated ecology). In 2024, Roux transferred Aspicilia calcitrapa to the genus Circinaria, publishing the new combination Circinaria calcitrapa.

== Description ==
Circinaria calcitrapa forms a pale crust on rock, typically 1–8 cm across and 0.15–0.7 mm thick. The surface is divided into angular patches (areoles) about 0.2–1.0 mm wide, with a colour ranging from brownish-white to greenish or pale ochre. A grey-black marginal line (the hypothallus) is sometimes visible around the edge of the thallus, and may be bordered by a whitish line.

The fruiting bodies (apothecia) are small (0.15–0.7 mm wide) and black, usually sitting in the areoles. The discs are dull and very finely roughened to nearly smooth, and lack a powdery coating. Under the microscope, the asci contain eight hyaline, ellipsoid spores, typically about 13.5–21.5 × 8.5–12 μm, and the pycnidia produce short, rod-shaped conidia, typically about 8–11.5 × about 1 μm. Standard chemical spot tests on the thallus are negative, and thin-layer chromatography did not detect lichen substances. The green pigment (caesiocinerea-green) in the epithecium and upper cortex shows an emerald-green reaction with nitric acid (N+).

== Habitat and distribution ==
This is a rock-dwelling species that grows on inclined to near-vertical faces of non-calcareous schist. In the original study it is characterised as a lichen of open, exposed sites, favouring dry, sunny, warm microhabitats, and occurring mainly at low elevations, sometimes reaching the lower montane zone.

Circinaria calcitrapa was reported originally only from the Pyrénées-Orientales. The authors list multiple collections from local nature reserves in that department (including Jujols, Nohèdes, and Nyer), suggesting it is a local component of xerothermic (warm, dry, sun-exposed) crust communities on siliceous rock. It was later recorded from the southwestern Alps, where it often grows with Pertusaria chiodectonoides.

Circinaria calcitrapa is the specific host of the lichenicolous fungus species Placopyrenium breussii.
