= Circinaria digitata =

Scientific classification
- Kingdom: Fungi
- Division: Ascomycota
- Class: Lecanoromycetes
- Order: Pertusariales
- Family: Megasporaceae
- Genus: Circinaria
- Species: C. digitata

Binomial name
- Circinaria digitata (Sohrabi & Litterski) Sohrabi (2012)
- Holotype: Jal-Jyr river valley, Jangy-Jer Range, Kyrgyzstan

Synonyms
- Aspicilia digitata Sohrabi & Litterski (2010)

Species of lichen

Circinaria digitata is a species of fruticose lichen in the family Megasporaceae. This small, soil-dwelling species is a vagrant lichen, and grows as loose, finger-like tufts that roll freely across the ground. It is restricted to high-elevation valleys of the Tian Shan mountain range in Kyrgyzstan, where it forms part of the so-called "manna" lichens – vagrant species whose thalli are not anchored to a substrate. The species was originally described in 2010 as Aspicilia digitata and transferred to the genus Circinaria after molecular work clarified relationships within the Megasporaceae.

== Taxonomy ==
Circinaria digitata was first formally described in 2010 as Aspicilia digitata by Mohammad Sohrabi and Birgit Litterski, based on vagrant thalli collected at 2,900 m on gravel terraces above the Jal-Jyr River in the central Tian Shan. The authors contrasted its narrowly digitate, intricately branched lobes and the distinctive black spots at the lobe tips with the broader, more robust branches of the superficially similar A. fruticulosa. In a comprehensive revision of the "manna lichens" the following year, Sohrabi transferred the species to the resurrected genus Circinaria, publishing the new combination Circinaria digitata. That same paper synonymised the vagrant genera Agrestia, Chlorangium and Sphaerothallia under a broadly circumscribed Circinaria, leaving no unattached ("vagrant") species in Aspicilia. The original holotype (H 5185-A) is housed in the Finnish Museum of Natural History, with an isotype (duplicate) preserved in Greifswald (GFW).

Multilocus phylogenetic analyses (nrITS, nrLSU and mtSSU rDNA) show that C. digitata belongs to a strongly supported "sphaerothallioid" clade that contains other vagrant or erratic members of the Megasporaceae; within this group it clusters with C. elmorei and C. hispida rather than with the morphologically alike C. fruticulosa. The study further demonstrates that several diagnostic features traditionally relied upon for generic delimitation—such as the presence of a two-layered cortex—have evolved more than once inside Circinaria and therefore lack phylogenetic significance. Together these results support treating C. digitata as a specialised, vagrant offshoot within a morphologically heterogeneous but monophyletic Circinaria.

== Description ==
The thallus forms minute, cushion-like balls about 0.5–1.5 cm across. Each tuft consists of hundreds of cylindrical branchlets that radiate from a narrow basal core. Individual lobes are 0.45–1 mm thick, irregularly divided and often curve back upon themselves, giving the whole thallus a coral-like appearance. Their upper surface is dull dark-green to grey-green, occasionally with pale olive tones. Near the tips the cortex breaks to form tiny white pseudocyphellae—microscopic pores that assist gas exchange—and the very apices usually bear a charcoal-black spot interpreted as a sterile pycnidium (a flask-shaped reproductive cavity).

Cross-sections show a two-layered cortex: an outer paraplectenchymatous band of tightly packed, brownish cells (25–35 μm thick) and an inner prosoplectenchymatous zone up to 100 μm thick. A cluster of green algal cells (5–15 μm diameter) lies immediately beneath the cortex, enveloping a white, loosely woven medulla. No apothecia have yet been observed, and standard chemical spot tests as well as thin-layer and high-performance liquid chromatography analyses failed to detect any secondary metabolites.

== Habitat and distribution ==
Circinaria digitata is a strictly terricolous (ground-dwelling) species: its tufts rest on gravelly river terraces or among coarse alpine steppe soils rather than attaching to rock or plant material. Field observations place it between 2900 m and 3100 m in subalpine belts of the Jangy-Jer and Moldo Too ridges, where summer conditions are windy, cool and arid. The thalli are free-moving; wind or water can roll them across the stony surface, a strategy that disperses fragments and allows the lichen to colonise sparsely vegetated ground.

At the time of its original publication, the species was known only from two closely spaced localities in central Kyrgyzstan, suggesting a narrow distribution and possible endemism to the inner Tian-Shan. Its apparent confinement to high-elevation river valleys contrasts with related vagrant species such as C. fruticulosa and C. hispida, which occupy drier lowland steppes across Eurasia and North America.
