= Circinaria mansourii =

Scientific classification
- Kingdom: Fungi
- Division: Ascomycota
- Class: Lecanoromycetes
- Order: Pertusariales
- Family: Megasporaceae
- Genus: Circinaria
- Species: C. mansourii

Binomial name
- Circinaria mansourii (Sohrabi) Sohrabi (2013)

Synonyms
- Aspicilia mansourii Sohrabi (2011)

Species of lichen

Circinaria mansourii is a species of terricolous (ground-dwelling) crustose lichen in the family Megasporaceae. It is primarily found on soil or plant debris in Iran, particularly in the mountainous steppe-like habitats. It was described as new to science in 2011.

== Taxonomy ==
Circinaria mansourii was first described by lichenologist Mohammad Sohrabi in 2011, as Aspicilia mansourii. The type specimen was discovered in Golestan National Park, in the region between Mirzabaylou and Almeh valley, at an altitude of 1,300 m (4,300 ft). Due to morphological similarities, the author initially suggested a close relationship to the terricolous North American species Aspicilia californica and A. filiformis. This species is named in honour of Reza Mansouri, an Iranian physicist who has made significant contributions to the development of science in Iran. In 2013, Sohrabi transferred the taxon to the genus Circinaria following molecular phylogenetic analysis.

== Description ==
The thallus of Circinaria mansourii is terricolous, growing on soil or plant debris and forming small patches up to 3–5 cm (1.2–2.0 in) wide. The lobes are more or less stringy, continuous, warty, and rimose, with a surface that is white-pruinose and smooth to roughened. The photobiont is green and chlorococcoid, with unicellular cells distributed in a regular to irregular layer. The lower surface of the thallus is white to pale yellow or dark grey to ochraceous. No apothecia or pycnidia have been observed in this species. Secondary chemistry includes aspicilin and an unknown fatty acid, and the thallus displays negative reactions to K, C, and P chemical spot tests in both medulla and cortex.

== Habitat and distribution ==
Circinaria mansourii has been found on calcareous soil and dead plant debris, often growing on dead tufts of Poa bulbosa and other perennial grasses. It is known to inhabit open mountain areas with steppe-like habitats, and has so far only been recorded in Iran. In addition to the type collection from Golestan National Park, it has also been reported to occur in East Azerbaijan province. It is one of the dominant lichen species in the biological soil crust communities of the arid ecosystems of the Iranian Artemisia steppes.
