= Circinaria arida =

Scientific classification
- Kingdom: Fungi
- Division: Ascomycota
- Class: Lecanoromycetes
- Order: Pertusariales
- Family: Megasporaceae
- Genus: Circinaria
- Species: C. arida

Binomial name
- Circinaria arida Owe-Larss., A.Nordin & Tibell (2011)

Species of lichen

Circinaria arida (pebble ball lichen) is a 0.5–6 cm, light olive-brown crustose lichen that grows on rock, often like a cluster of little light brown to olive balls growing on pebbles, in the southwestern deserts of North America. It is also found in Eurasia, and arid parts of North America from the southern Great Plains and Midwest to California. It is warty (verrucose) with the warts sometimes cracking apart areolate. The warts or areolas have angular to rounded sides. The 0.2-2.3 mm, convex to flat-topped areolas are separated by deep fissures that may be as deep (0.1–2 mm) as the areola is wide, so the lichen often appears to be made of clusters of little balls crammed up next to each other, although the areolas are sometimes isolated. In California it is commonly found growing on pebbles. Each areola has a single sunken black, dust covered (pruinose) fruiting body (apothecium) with a white rim. A thin strip of prothallus sometimes is at the outer edge, forming a narrow dark zone (fimbriate). The similar Aspicilia desertorum has a white pruina (dusty coating) on the apothecia. It is negative for lichen spot tests, I−, K−, P−, C−.
