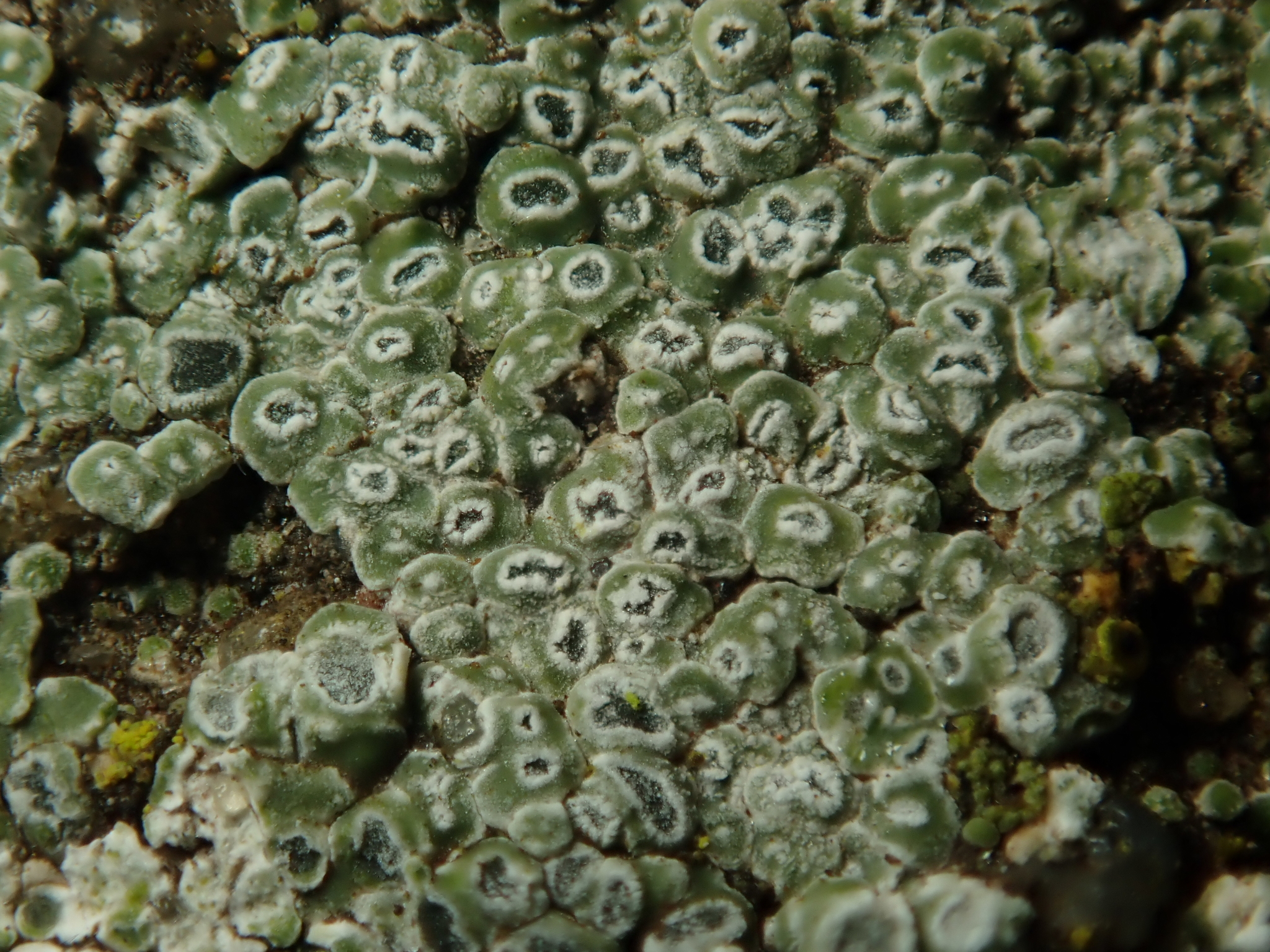
- Circinaria contorta

Scientific classification
- Kingdom: Fungi
- Division: Ascomycota
- Class: Lecanoromycetes
- Order: Pertusariales
- Family: Megasporaceae
- Genus: Circinaria; Link (1809)

= Circinaria =

Genus of lichen-forming fungi

Circinaria is a genus of lichen-forming fungi in the family Megasporaceae. It was circumscribed by Johann Heinrich Friedrich Link in 1809.

== Species ==
As of January 2026, Species Fungorum accepts 40 species of Circinaria.

- Circinaria affinis (Eversm.) Sohrabi (2012)
- Circinaria arida Owe-Larss., A.Nordin & Tibell (2011)
- Circinaria caesiocinerea (Nyl. ex Malbr.) A.Nordin, Savić & Tibell (2010)
- Circinaria calcarea (L.) A.Nordin, Savić & Tibell (2010)
- Circinaria calcitrapa (Cl.Roux & A.Nordin) Cl.Roux (2024)
- Circinaria cerebroides (Mereschk.) Sohrabi (2012)
- Circinaria clercii (Cl.Roux & M.Bertrand) Cl.Roux (2024)
- Circinaria contorta (Hoffm.) A.Nordin, Savić & Tibell (2010)
- Circinaria crespiana (V.J.Rico) Sohrabi & V.J.Rico (2013)
- Circinaria cupreogrisea (Th.Fr.) A.Nordin, Savić & Tibell (2010)
- Circinaria deminuta P.M.McCarthy & Elix (2020) – Australia
- Circinaria digitata (Sohrabi & Litterski) Sohrabi (2012)
- Circinaria elmorei (E.D.Rudolph) Owe-Larss., A.Nordin & Sohrabi (2011)
- Circinaria emiliae (Tomin) A.Nordin, Savić & Tibell (2010)
- Circinaria esculenta (Pall.) Sohrabi (2012)
- Circinaria excrescens (J.Steiner) Sohrabi (2019)
- Circinaria fruticulosa (Eversm.) Sohrabi (2012)
- Circinaria gibbosa (Ach.) A.Nordin, Savić & Tibell (2010)
- Circinaria hispida (Mereschk.) A.Nordin, Savić & Tibell (2010)
- Circinaria hispidoides (Mereschk.) Paukov, Davydov, Sohrabi & Q.Ren (2026)
- Circinaria hoffmanniana (S.Ekman & Fröberg ex R.Sant.) A.Nordin (2016)
- Circinaria jussuffii (Link) Sohrabi (2016)
- Circinaria lacunosa (Mereschk.) Sohrabi (2012)
- Circinaria laxilobata G.Ismayil, A.Abbas & S.Y.Guo (2019)
- Circinaria leprosescens (Sandst.) A.Nordin, Savić & Tibell (2010)
- Circinaria maculata (H.Magnusson) Q.Ren (2018)
- Circinaria mansourii (Sohrabi) Sohrabi (2013)
- Circinaria nimisii Sohrabi, H.Mayrhofer, Obermayer & S.D.Leav. (2023) – Greece
- Circinaria ochracea Thüs & Nascimb. (2023)
- Circinaria ochraceoalba (H.Magn.) Q.Ren (2018)
- Circinaria persepolitana Sohrabi & Pérez-Ort. (2024)
- Circinaria rogeri (Sohrabi) Sohrabi (2012)
- Circinaria rostamii Sohrabi (2012)
- Circinaria scabridula (H.Magn.) Sohrabi (2019)
- Circinaria schafeevii (Tomin) Q.Ren (2018)
- Circinaria scyphulifera Paukov, Chesnokov & Konoreva (2018) – Russia
- Circinaria semicontorta R.Zulfiqar, H.S.Asghar, K.Habib & Khalid (2024)
- Circinaria serenensis (Cl.Roux & M.Bertrand) A.Nordin (2016)
- Circinaria straussii (J.Steiner) Sohrabi (2019)
- Circinaria subochracea (H.Magn.) Q.Ren (2018)
- Circinaria tominii (Oxner) Sohrabi (2012)
- Circinaria tortuosa (H.Magnusson) Q.Ren (2018)
- Circinaria transbaicalica (Oxner) Q.Ren (2018)
- Circinaria ucrainica Khodos. & Darmostuk (2024) – Ukraine
- Circinaria yiae Q.Ren, Paukov & Davydov (2026) – China
