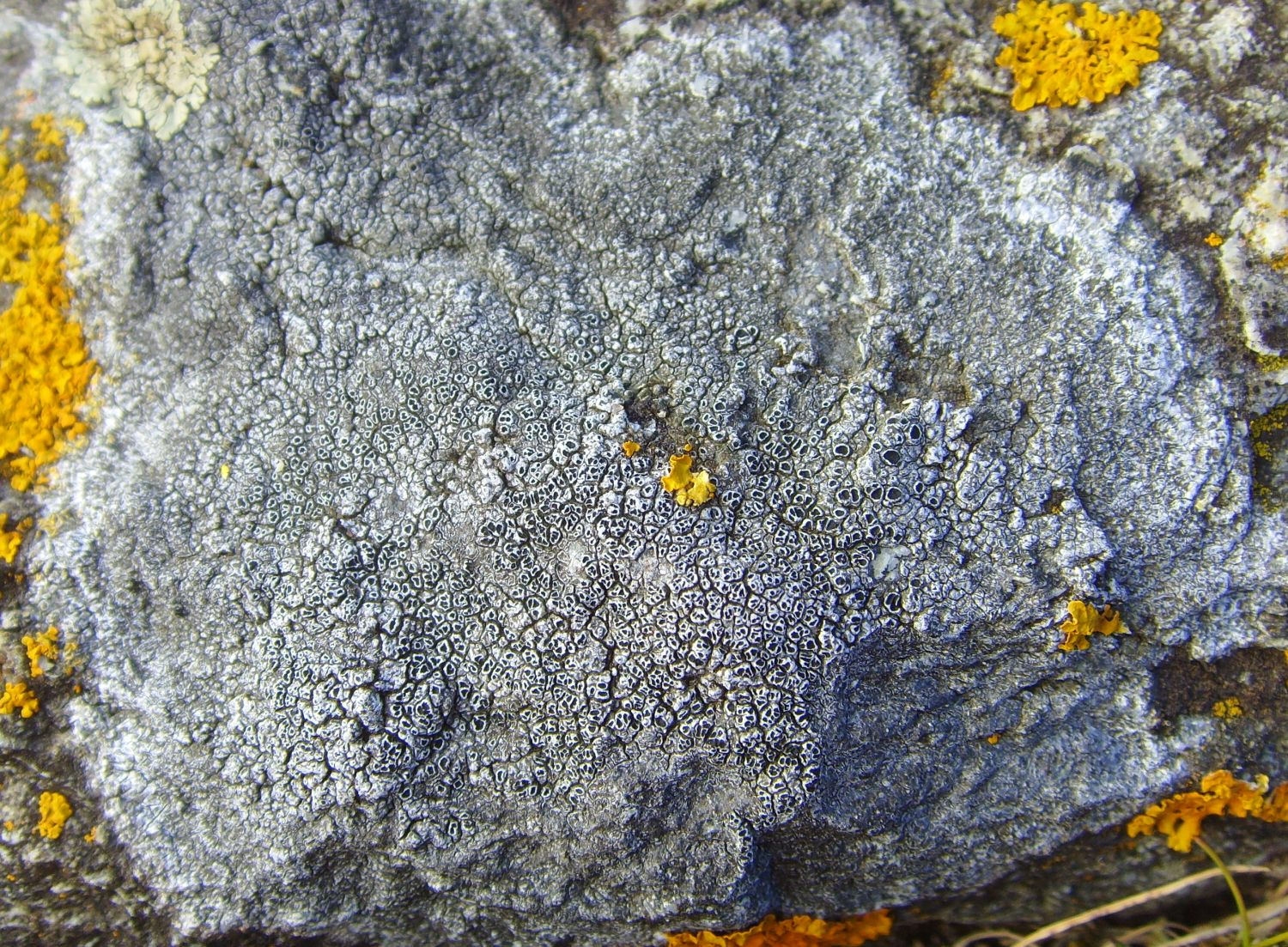

Conservation status
- Secure (NatureServe)

Scientific classification
- Kingdom: Fungi
- Division: Ascomycota
- Class: Lecanoromycetes
- Order: Pertusariales
- Family: Megasporaceae
- Genus: Circinaria
- Species: C. caesiocinerea

Binomial name
- Circinaria caesiocinerea (Nyl. ex Malbr.) A.Nordin, S.Savić & Tibell (2010)

Synonyms
- Lecanora caesiocinerea Nyl. (1869); Aspicilia caesiocinerea (Nyl. ex Malbr.) Arnold (1886); Pachyospora caesiocinerea (Nyl.) M.Choisy (1931); Urceolaria caesiocinerea (Nyl.) Motyka (1996)

= Circinaria caesiocinerea =

Species of lichen in the family Megasporaceae

Circinaria caesiocinerea is a species of crustose lichen belonging to the family Megasporaceae. It was first described as Lecanora caesiocinerea in 1869 by William Nylander, but was transferred to the genus Circinaria in 2010 by Anders Nordin, Sanja Savić, and Leif Tibell.
