= Chimney Rock, Colorado =

Unincorporated community in Archuleta County, CO, USA

- Unincorporated community
- Location of Chimney Rock, Colorado. Chimney Rock (Colorado)
- Coordinates: 37°13′42″N 107°20′52″W
- Country: United States
- State: Colorado
- County: Archuleta

Government
  - Type: Unincorporated community
  - Body: Archuleta County
- Elevation: 6,560 ft (2,000 m)
- Time zone: UTC−07:00 (MST)
  - Summer (DST): UTC−06:00 (MDT)
- ZIP code: Bayfield 81122; Pagosa Springs 81147
- Area codes: 970/748
- GNIS place ID: 196439

Chimney Rock is an unincorporated community and former post office in Archuleta County, Colorado, United States. The Chimney Rock community is located along U.S. Route 160, 3.4 miles (5.5 km) northwest of the Chimney Rock pillar in Chimney Rock National Monument.

== History ==
The Chimney Rock, Colorado, post office operated from November 1, 1950, until April 7, 1967.

In the 1960 Census, Chimney Rock's population was 2.

== See also ==
- List of populated places in Colorado
