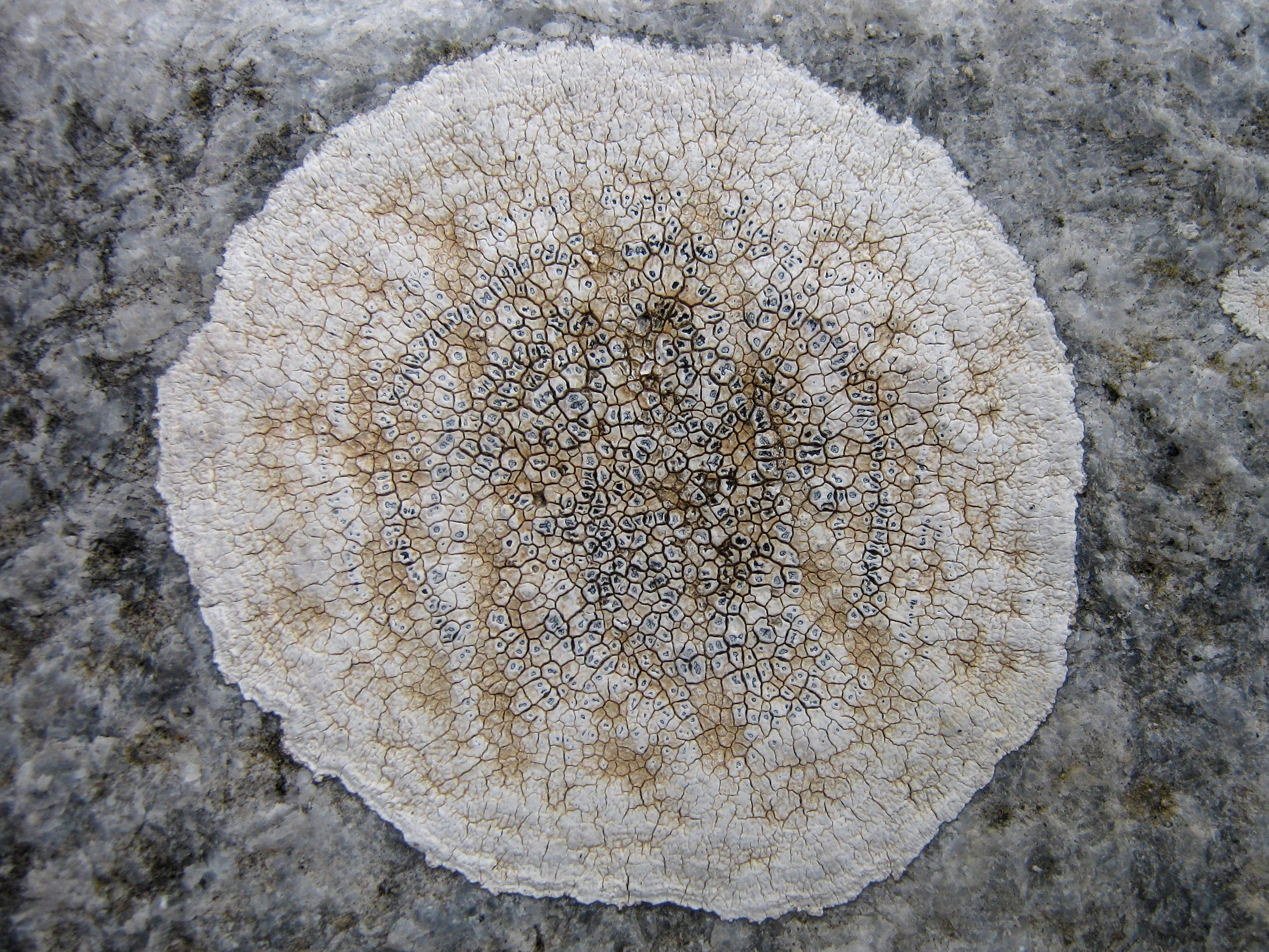

Scientific classification
- Kingdom: Fungi
- Division: Ascomycota
- Class: Lecanoromycetes
- Order: Pertusariales
- Family: Megasporaceae
- Genus: Circinaria
- Species: C. calcarea

Binomial name
- Circinaria calcarea (L.) A.Nordin, Savić & Tibell 2010

Synonyms
- Lichen calcareus L. (1753); Aspicilia calcarea (L.) Körb. (1861)

= Circinaria calcarea =

Species of lichen

Circinaria calcarea is a species of crustose lichen in the family Megasporaceae. It was first described as a new species by Carl Linnaeus in his 1753 work Species Plantarum. Linnaeus named it Lichen calcareus, as he classified all lichens in the eponymously named genus. The species has had an extensive taxonomic history, resulting in dozens of synonyms. In 2010, it was placed in its current genus, Circinaria, following molecular phylogenetic analysis of the Megasporaceae.

Circinaria calcarea has a cosmopolitan distribution, having been recorded from the Arctic, Asia, Australasia, Europe, Oceania, Central America, South America, and North America. It is a saxicolous lichen, and grows on calcareous, calciferous, and basic rock.

== See also ==
- List of lichens named by Carl Linnaeus
