= Circinaria persepolitana =

Scientific classification
- Kingdom: Fungi
- Division: Ascomycota
- Class: Lecanoromycetes
- Order: Pertusariales
- Family: Megasporaceae
- Genus: Circinaria
- Species: C. persepolitana

Binomial name
- Circinaria persepolitana Sohrabi & Pérez-Ort.

Species of lichen

Circinaria persepolitana is a species of lichen in the family Megasporaceae that has been identified on the historical stone surfaces of Persepolis in Iran.

== Discovery ==
This lichen was discovered in 2024 by an international team of researchers from Iran, Spain, Russia, and Italy, and was published in the journal The Lichenologist.

== Characteristics ==
This lichen has a crustose structure with an olive to olive-brown surface that appears cracked or areolate. At the margins, it has angular to elongate areoles. Phylogenetic analyses show that this species is closely related to C. mansourii, C. ochracea, and C. reptans.

Microscopic studies have shown that Circinaria persepolitana adheres directly to the surface of stones and can induce biophysical and biochemical changes in the rock. These properties make it a potential agent of biodeterioration for ancient stone structures. Although the presence of this lichen has also been observed in the natural surroundings of Persepolis, its highest density occurs in the historical and decorative sections of the site.
