= Jangy-Jer =

Jangy-Jer Kyrgyz: Жаңы-Жер
- Location within Kyrgyzstan
- Coordinates: 40°07′30″N 70°53′50″E
- Country: Kyrgyzstan
- Region: Batken
- District: Batken
- Elevation: 970 m (3,180 ft)

Population (2021)
  - Total: 3,168
- Time zone: UTC+6

Jangy-Jer (Kyrgyz: Жаңы-Жер) is a village in Batken Region of Kyrgyzstan. It is part of the Batken District. Its population was 3,168 in 2021.
