= Roger Rosentreter =

American botanist and lichenologist

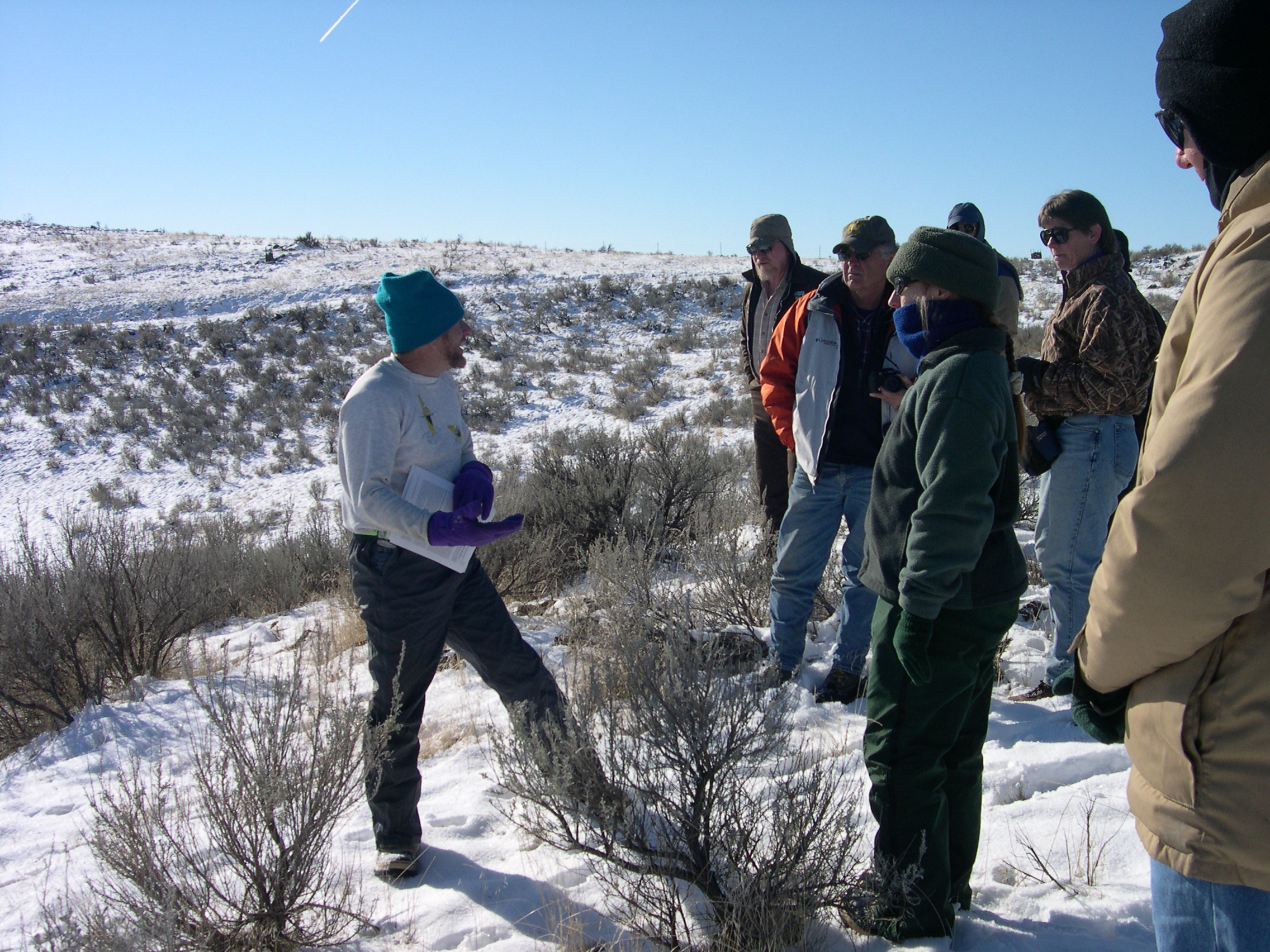
- Botanist Roger Rosentreter teaching about sagebrush – Artemisia – in southwestern Idaho
- Born: December 10, 1951 (age 74)
- Education: University of Montana; Clark University
- Scientific career
- Fields: Lichenology; Plant ecology Weed control
- Workplaces: Bureau of Land Management
- Thesis: The synecology of the epithetic lichen Xanthoria fallax (Hepp) Arn. occurring on the three subspecies of Artemisis tridentata Nutt. (allelopathic parasitism) (1984)
- Author abbrev. (botany): Rosentr.

Roger Dale Rosentreter (born 1951) is a botanist, plant ecologist, naturalist, and conservationist. He was the president of the American Bryological and Lichenological Society from 2011 to 2013.

== Education and career ==
Rosentreter graduated in 1974 with B.A. in botany and biology from the University of Montana and in 1976 with M.A. in biology from Clark University. From 1978 to 1977 in Browning, Montana he was a high school science teacher in biology and earth science, as well a cross-country and track coach. From March 1978 to January 2013 he was a U.S. Bureau of Land Management (BLM) employee, based in Boise, Idaho. He worked for the BLM both statewide and regionally, often as an educator. At BLM's Idaho State Office he was the program manager for rare and endangered plants and for weed management. He also assisted on wildlife projects, vegetation mapping, and land restoration. During his BLM career he received in 1984 a Ph.D. in botany from the University of Montana. There he taught courses in plant taxonomy, plant physiology, and agrostology. He was an adjunct professor at several universities, directed independent study in several academic disciplines, and was an occasional substitute professor in general botany, mycology, plant systematics, and mammalogy. Beginning in 1988, he served as a graduate faculty committee member at Boise State University, Idaho State University, Brigham Young University and Utah State University for several M.S. and Ph.D. students. At Boise State University he taught, from 1985 to 1989, flatwater and whitewater canoeing and, from 2001 to 2012, landscaping with native plants.

During his BLM career and during his retirement, Rosentreter collected more than 19,000 specimens, the vast majority being lichens, and donated duplicates of the specimens to herbaria all over the world. He is a leading expert on Idaho's rare plant species and has made a particular effort to protect the species Lewisia sacajaweana. He harshly criticized the methods used by the BLM in its rehabilitation efforts for sage grouse habitat following the 2015 Soda Fire, which burned nearly 280,000 acres in Idaho and Oregon southwest of Boise. He is the author or co-author of nearly 100 scientific publications. In 2022 he edited the exsiccata Anderson & Shushan Lichens of Western North America. He has done considerable research in grass ecology, cheatgrass control, and firewise landscaping and planning.

An avid kayaker and naturalist, Rosentreter has participated in efforts to remove trash from the Boise River and its beaches. In 2006 he received the Idaho Weed Hall of Fame Award from the Idaho Noxious Weed Control Association.

== Selected publications ==
- Rosentreter, Roger (1993). "Vagrant Lichens in North America". The Bryologist. 96 (3): 333–338. doi:10.2307/3243861. JSTOR 3243861.
- "Displacement of rare plants by exotic grasses by Roger Rosentreter". Proceedings of Ecology and Management of Annual Rangelands. USDA Forest Service General Technical Report INT-GTR-313. Intermountain Research Station, Ogden, UT. 1994. pp. 170–175.
- Hayward, Gregory D.; Rosentreter, Roger (1994). "Lichens as Nesting Material for Northern Flying Squirrels in the Northern Rocky Mountains". Journal of Mammalogy. 75 (3): 663–673. doi:10.2307/1382514. JSTOR 1382514.
- Eldridge, D.J.; Rosentreter, R. (1999). "Morphological groups: A framework for monitoring microphytic crusts in arid landscapes". Journal of Arid Environments. 41 (1): 11–25. Bibcode:1999JArEn..41...11E. doi:10.1006/jare.1998.0468.
- McCune, Bruce; Rosentreter, Roger; Ponzetti, Jeanne M.; Shaw, David C. (2000). "Epiphyte Habitats in an Old Conifer Forest in Western Washington, U.S.A.". The Bryologist. 103 (3): 417–427. doi:10.1639/0007-2745(2000)103[0417:EHIAOC]2.0.CO;2. ISSN 0007-2745.
- Rosentreter, R.; Belnap, J. (2001). "Biological Soil Crusts of North America". Biological Soil Crusts: Structure, Function, and Management. Ecological Studies. Vol. 150. pp. 31–50. doi:10.1007/978-3-642-56475-8_2. ISBN 978-3-540-43757-4.
- Hilty, Julie H.; Eldridge, David J.; Rosentreter, Roger; Wicklow-Howard, Marcia C.; Pellant, Mike (2004). "Recovery of biological soil crusts following wildfire in Idaho". Rangeland Ecology & Management. 57: 89–96. doi:10.2111/1551-5028(2004)057[0089:ROBSCF]2.0.CO;2. hdl:10150/643504. ISSN 1551-5028.
- Bowker, Matthew A.; Belnap, Jayne; Rosentreter, Roger; Graham, Bernadette (2004). "Wildfire-resistant biological soil crusts and fire-induced loss of soil stability in Palouse prairies, USA". Applied Soil Ecology. 26 (1): 41–52. Bibcode:2004AppSE..26...41B. doi:10.1016/j.apsoil.2003.10.005.
- Serpe, Marcelo D.; Orm, Jeanne M.; Barkes, Tara; Rosentreter, Roger (2006). "Germination and seed water status of four grasses on moss-dominated biological soil crusts from arid lands". Plant Ecology. 185 (1): 163–178. Bibcode:2006PlEco.185..163S. doi:10.1007/s11258-005-9092-1. S2CID 6142884.
- Deines, Lynell; Rosentreter, Roger; Eldridge, David J.; Serpe, Marcelo D. (2007). "Germination and seedling establishment of two annual grasses on lichen-dominated biological soil crusts". Plant and Soil. 295 (1–2): 23–35. Bibcode:2007PlSoi.295...23D. doi:10.1007/s11104-007-9256-y. S2CID 43263457.
- Rosentreter, R.; Bowker, M.; Belnap, J. (2007). "A field guide to biological soil crusts of western US drylands: common lichens and bryophytes". Bureau of Land Management. Denver, Colorado: U.S. Government Printing Office: 1–104; 104 pages
- Will-Wolf, Susan; Jovan, Sarah; Neitlich, Peter; Peck, Jerilynn E.; Rosentreter, Roger (2015). "Lichen-based indices to quantify responses to climate and air pollution across northeastern U.S.A". The Bryologist. 118: 59–82. doi:10.1639/0007-2745-118.1.059. S2CID 83789550.
- Rosentreter, R. (2007). "Biotic soil crust lichens of the Columbia Basin". Faculty & Staff Authored Books. Corvallis, Oregon: Northwest Lichenologists.
- Condon, Lea A.; Pietrasiak, Nicole; Rosentreter, Roger; Pyke, David A. (2020). "Passive restoration of vegetation and biological soil crusts following 80 years of exclusion from grazing across the Great Basin". Restoration Ecology. 28 (S2): S75–S85. doi:10.1111/rec.13021.
