= Chimney Rock National Monument =

National Monument in Colorado, US

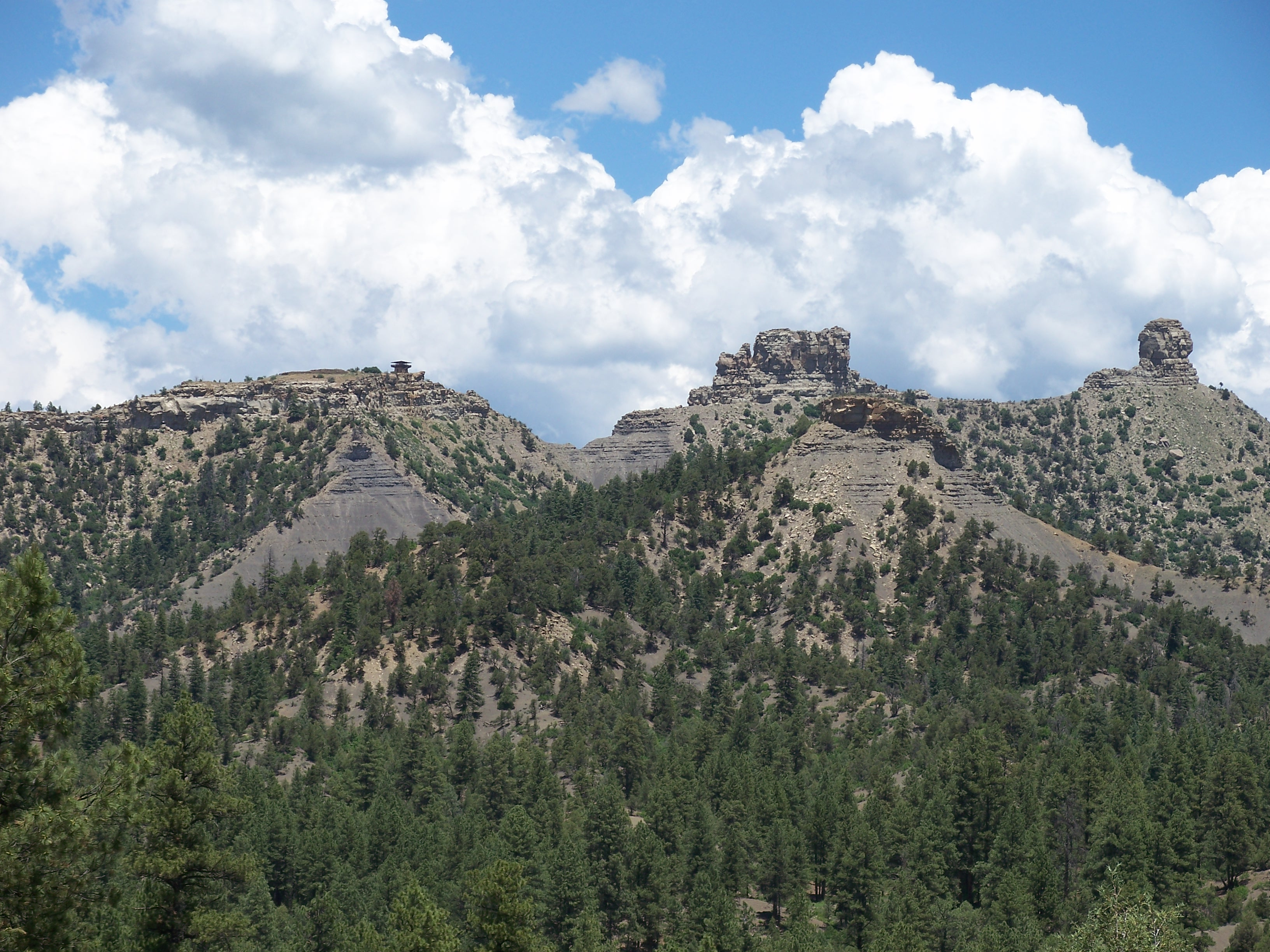
- Chimney Rock is on the right, Companion Rock on the left

- Location within Colorado Location within the United States
- Interactive map of Chimney Rock National Monument
- Location: Archuleta County, Colorado, USA
- Nearest city: Chimney Rock, Colorado
- Coordinates: 37.1917°N 107.3064°W
- Area: 4,726 acres (19.13 km^{2})
- Authorized: September 21, 2012
- Governing body: U.S. Forest Service
- Website: Chimney Rock National Monument

U.S. National Register of Historic Places
- Designated: August 25, 1970
- Reference no.: 70000153

Colorado State Register of Historic Properties
- Official name: Chimney Rock Archaeological Area
- Reference no.: 5AA.985

Chimney Rock National Monument is a 4,726-acre (1,913 ha) U.S. National Monument in San Juan National Forest in southwestern Colorado which includes an archaeological site. This area is located in Archuleta County, Colorado, between Durango and Pagosa Springs, and is managed for archaeological protection, public interpretation, and education. The Chimney Rock Archaeological Site has been listed on the National Register of Historic Places since 1970. U.S. President Barack Obama created Chimney Rock National Monument by proclamation on September 21, 2012, under authority of the Antiquities Act.

== Geography ==
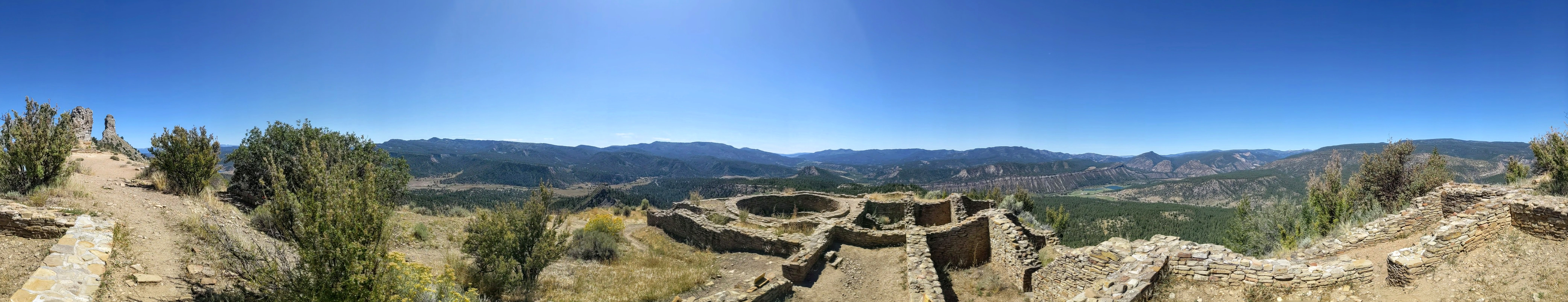
Full 360-degree panoramic view from the Great House; from left to right: Companion Rock and Chimney Rock to the north, the valley of Stollsteimer Creek (a tributary of the Piedra River) to the east, the Great House and points south along the ridge, the valley of the Piedra River to the west

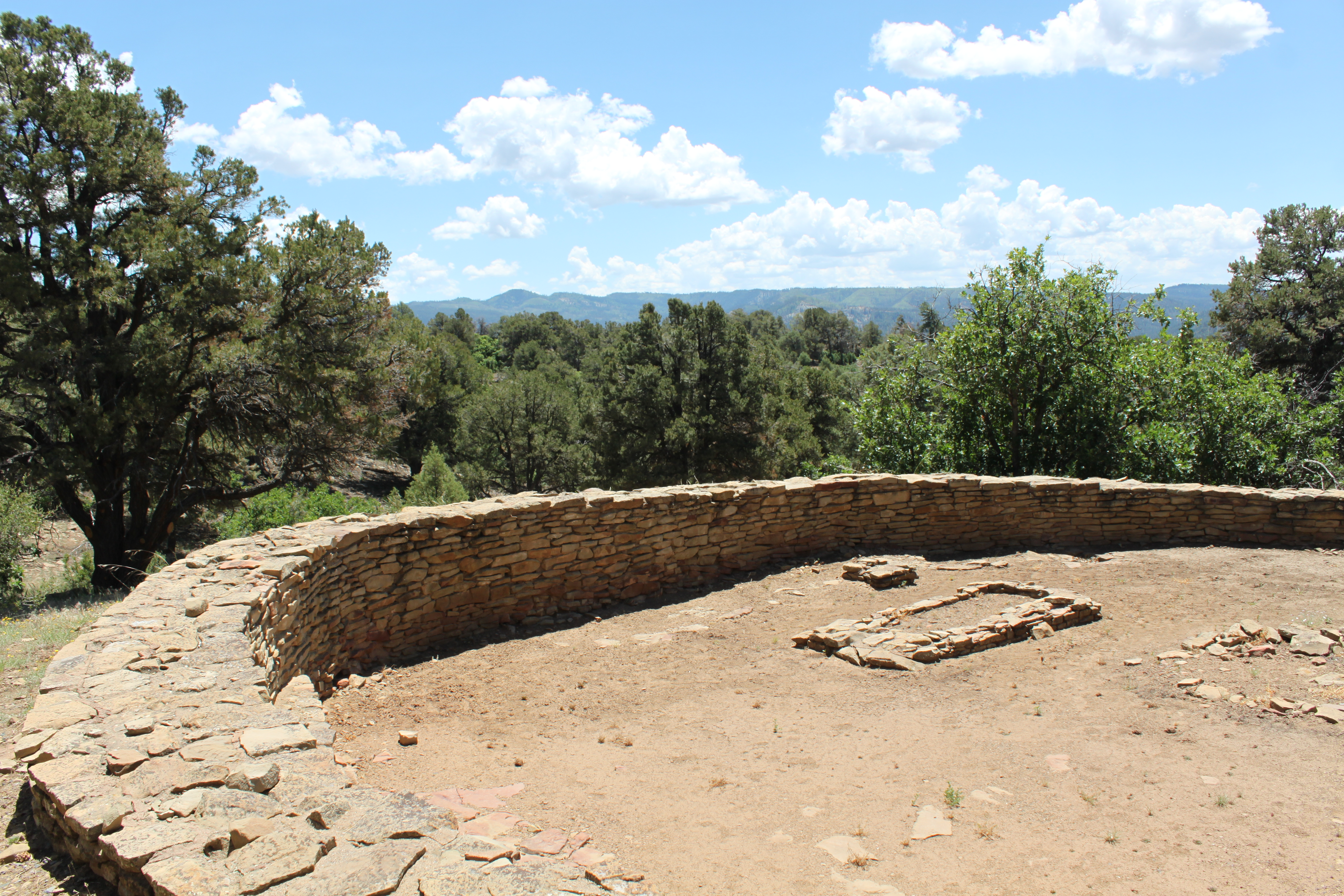
The Great Kiva was built in AD 1084 as part of the Chimney Rock settlement. Originally, it would have had an adobe plaster exterior. It was reconstructed and stabilized in 1972.

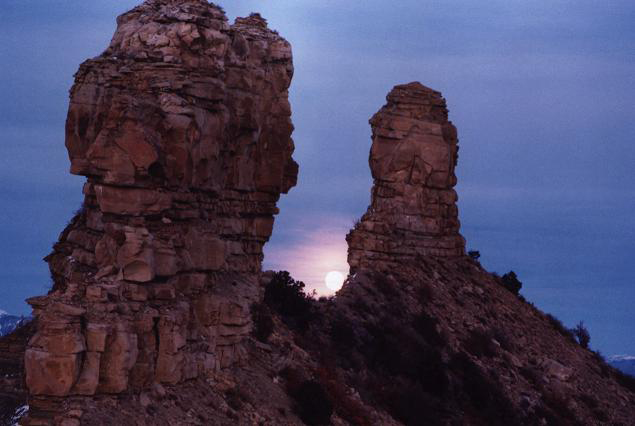
Major Lunar Standstill at Chimney Rock National Monument

Chimney Rock National Monument lies on 4,726 acres (19 km^{2}) of San Juan National Forest land surrounded by the Southern Ute Indian Reservation. The Chimney Rock Archeological Area, listed in the National Register of Historic Places in 1970, consists of a central 960 acres.

Chimney Rock itself is approximately 315 feet (96 m) tall. Next to Chimney Rock is Companion Rock, which is a popular nesting spot for the Peregrine Falcon.

The primary settlements that have been excavated lie on the ridge that eventually terminates at Chimney Rock. The ridge is mostly bedrock made of sandstone.

== History ==
The Ancestral Puebloan site, designated on the National Register of Historic Places in 1970, was a community inhabited between Durango and Pagosa Springs about 1,000 years ago with about 200 rooms. Rooms in the buildings were used for living, work areas and ceremonial purposes.

The site is located within the San Juan National Forest Archaeological Area on 4,726 acres (1,913 ha) of land. Between May 15 and September 30 the Visitor Center is open and guided walking tours are conducted daily.

Housing approximately 2,000 ancient Pueblo Indians between AD 925 and 1125, the settlement included a Great House Pueblo with round ceremonial rooms, known as kivas, and 36 ground-floor rooms. A grizzly bear jaw found in one of the rooms when excavated suggested a reverence for the animal, and modern Chaco oral history suggests that the Bear clan originated in the Chimney Rock area.

The Chaco culture which inhabited the Chimney Rock area was hierarchical, with a priest class overseeing the area's inhabitants. The construction of the Great House Pueblo at the top of the ridge, close to Chimney Rock and its neighbor Companion Rock, had a large ceremonial role in the later years of Chacoan presence. As the moon makes its lunar cycle across the sky over a period of 18.6 years, it appears in a lunar standstill between the two rocks for approximately 16 months.

Evidence suggests that Great House Pueblo was first built in AD 1076 during a lunar standstill and expanded and finished in AD 1093 during another. It consists of 36 rooms and two kivas. Archaeologists believe that Great House Pueblo was mainly ceremonial in nature, with only one or two families living in its rooms. During certain key ceremonies, it functioned as a hotel for visiting notables, some of whom came from as far away as Chaco Canyon, in modern-day Northern New Mexico, 90 miles from Chimney Rock.

Material to build the Great House Pueblo came from downhill and was hauled by hand up the ridge line from further below. Five pithouses, titled Room A through E, probably housed the workers who built Great House Pueblo. Rooms A and B were excavated in 1921–1922 by early archaeologists, but their insufficient knowledge of how to stabilize walls, coupled with a decision to use the wood they found in the ruins for their campfires, has left little knowledge of these ruins, with little left today. The pottery was preserved and is now stored in boxes in the basement of the Anasazi Center in Durango.

Halfway between the worker's houses and the Great House Pueblo was a ruin that archaeologists named the "Guardhouse". It stretched from one side of the ridge to the other, and housed one family. Rather than serving as a defensive post against invaders, it more likely performed crowd control, keeping undesirables out of the Great House Pueblo, and letting the elites through. After excavation this ruin became extremely unstable and was eventually removed by the Forest Service for fear of visitors' safety.

The base of the trail up to Great House Pueblo begins next to a pit-house complex made up of three pit houses and accompanying workrooms. An extended, multi generational family would have lived in this complex. Excavations of the workrooms showed separate areas with grinding stones for corn and a sort of "man cave" where men would make arrowheads and tools.

The last two excavated sites are a singular pit house and the Great Kiva. The Great Kiva shows similarities to others across the southwest, with a central fire pit, diverting stone and ventilation shaft.

It also has unique features. Instead of a bench that runs the perimeter to store ritual items, several pits in the ground were built, and they are believed to be storage areas. When excavated, archaeological students found a lack of wood and other roof materials; their hypothesis was that it had no roof and was open to the air. An alternative hypothesis is that it was never finished for a number of reasons. One is that—built in 1084—it was abandoned before they finished. The other is that during construction, the builders believed it had bad spirits and didn't wish to finish.

The inhabitants of Chimney Rock abandoned the site in 1125, burning the buildings when they left. Their modern-day descendants consider the site sacred with the spirits of their ancestors, and have asked the Forest Service to refrain from further excavation out of respect.

Since the 1960s, Frank Eddy of the University of Colorado and others have studied the site, and research continues. Eight villages or settlements have been discovered in the area so far, a majority of which have remained unexcavated since Eddy's work in the early 1970s.

Utilizing the provisions of the Antiquities Act, U.S. president Barack Obama elevated the archeological site to the status of a national monument on September 21, 2012.

Guided and self-guided tours begin at the small visitor center at the base of the monument today. The guided tour comes in two parts; a quarter mile paved pathway that winds through unexcavated sites and the Great Kiva and singular pithouse, and a third mile, more strenuous dirt and rock path that runs past the pit house complex, Rooms A-E, the Guardhouse, and Great House Pueblo. The tour lasts approximately 2 1/2 hours and gives detailed information of the inhabitants and their lives.

Since it became a National Monument, Chimney Rock's volunteers and employees have been calling for a grant to build a small museum on site to display information and artifacts from excavations. Currently all artifacts are boxed and stored in museums across the Four Corners Region.

== Biology ==
In the mid-1970s, Companion Rock was home to one of only seven remaining pairs of peregrine falcons in the Rocky Mountains region at the time. The experiences of Marcy Cottrell Houle in studying this pair of peregrine falcons were documented in her book Wings for My Flight: The Peregrine Falcons of Chimney Rock.

Peregrine falcons continue to nest in Companion Rock each year.

== Educational opportunities ==
As part of a continuing education program, the first virtual visitors this year were 26 people on indoor stationary bicycles in Ohio. They cycled, virtually, to the Monument, around the Monument, and from the Monument, while studying its rich history.

== Funding sources ==
Its care, protection, and preservation are shared by the Pagosa Ranger District, United States Forest Service and the public, who contribute through tour fees, donations, and purchase of items from the Chimney Rock Visitor Center. The Chimney Rock Interpretive Program, managed and staffed by the U.S. Forest Service and volunteers of the Chimney Rock Interpretive Association, conducts daily guided walking tours and operates the Visitor Center during in-season, May 15 to September 30.

== See also ==
- List of prehistoric sites in Colorado
- List of national monuments of the United States
