= Nohèdes =

Nohèdes Noedes
- Commune
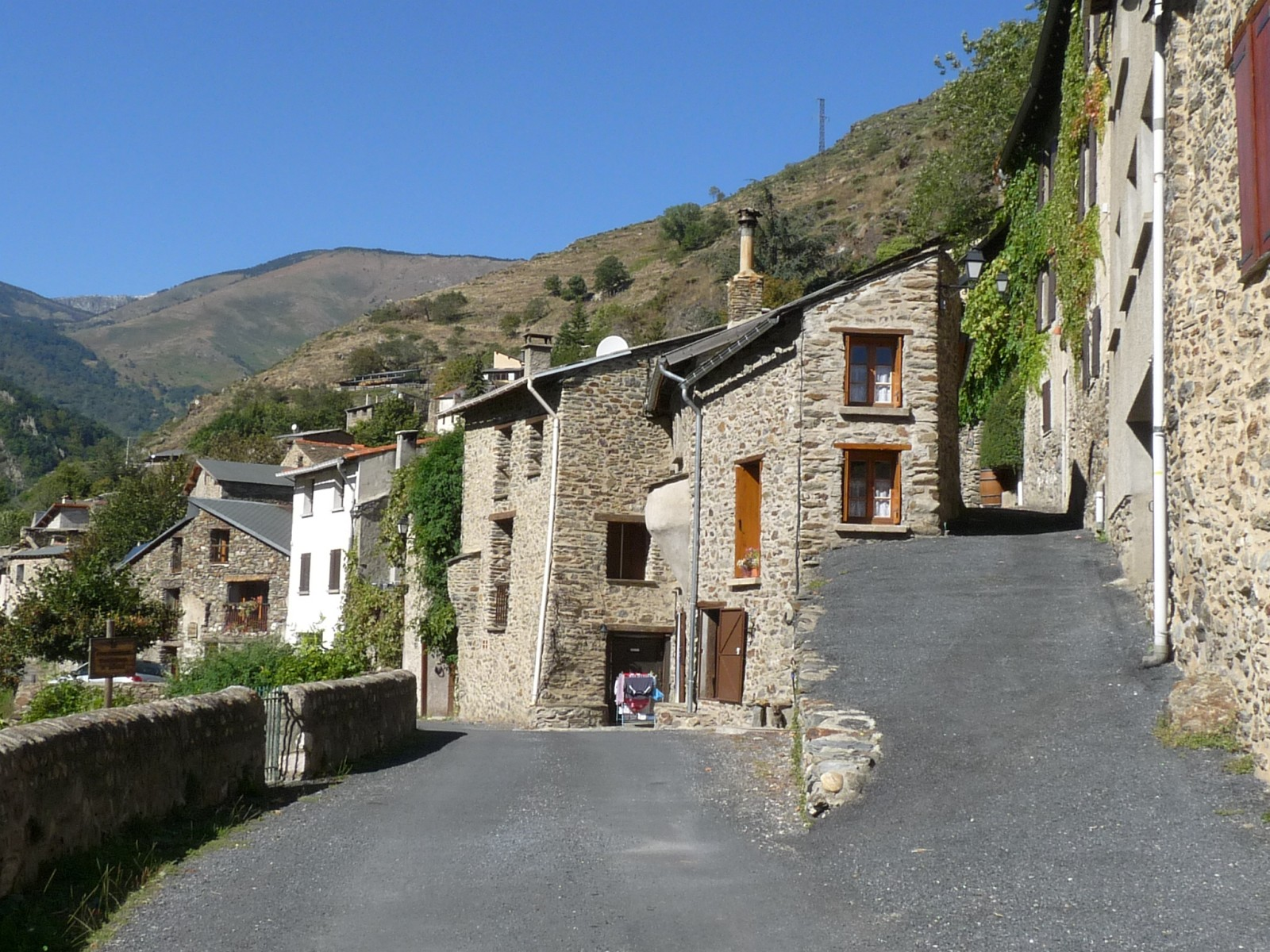
- The road into Nohèdes
- Location of Nohèdes
- Location within France Location within Occitanie
- Coordinates: 42°37′26″N 2°17′23″E
- Country: France
- Region: Occitania
- Department: Pyrénées-Orientales
- Arrondissement: Prades
- Canton: Les Pyrénées catalanes

Government
  - Mayor (2020–2026): Thierry Begue
- Area^{1}: 30.91 km^{2} (11.93 sq mi)
- Elevation: 995 m (3,264 ft)
- Highest elevation: 2,459 m (8,068 ft)
- Lowest elevation: 758 m (2,487 ft)
- Population (2023): 61
  - Density: 2.0/km^{2} (5.1/sq mi)
- Time zone: UTC+01:00 (CET)
  - Summer (DST): UTC+02:00 (CEST)
- INSEE/Postal code: 66122 /66500
- ^{1} French Land Register data, which excludes lakes, ponds, glaciers > 1 km^{2} (0.386 sq mi or 247 acres) and river estuaries.

Nohèdes (French pronunciation: [nɔɛd]; Catalan: Noedes) is a commune in the Pyrénées-Orientales department in southern France.

== Geography ==
Nohèdes is located in the canton of Les Pyrénées catalanes and in the arrondissement of Prades.

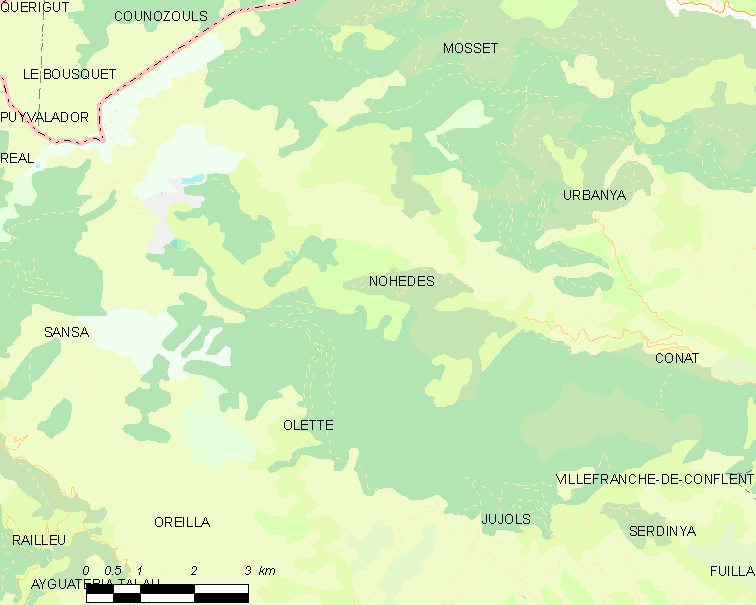
Map of Nohèdes and its surrounding communes

== Population ==
Historical population
| Year | Pop. | ±% p.a. |
|---|---|---|
| 1968 | 21 | — |
| 1975 | 23 | +1.31% |
| 1982 | 26 | +1.77% |
| 1990 | 55 | +9.82% |
| 1999 | 62 | +1.34% |
| 2007 | 71 | +1.71% |
| 2012 | 65 | −1.75% |
| 2017 | 63 | −0.62% |
| 2023 | 61 | −0.54% |
Source: INSEE

== See also ==
- Communes of the Pyrénées-Orientales department
