= Jujols =

Jujols Jújols
- Commune
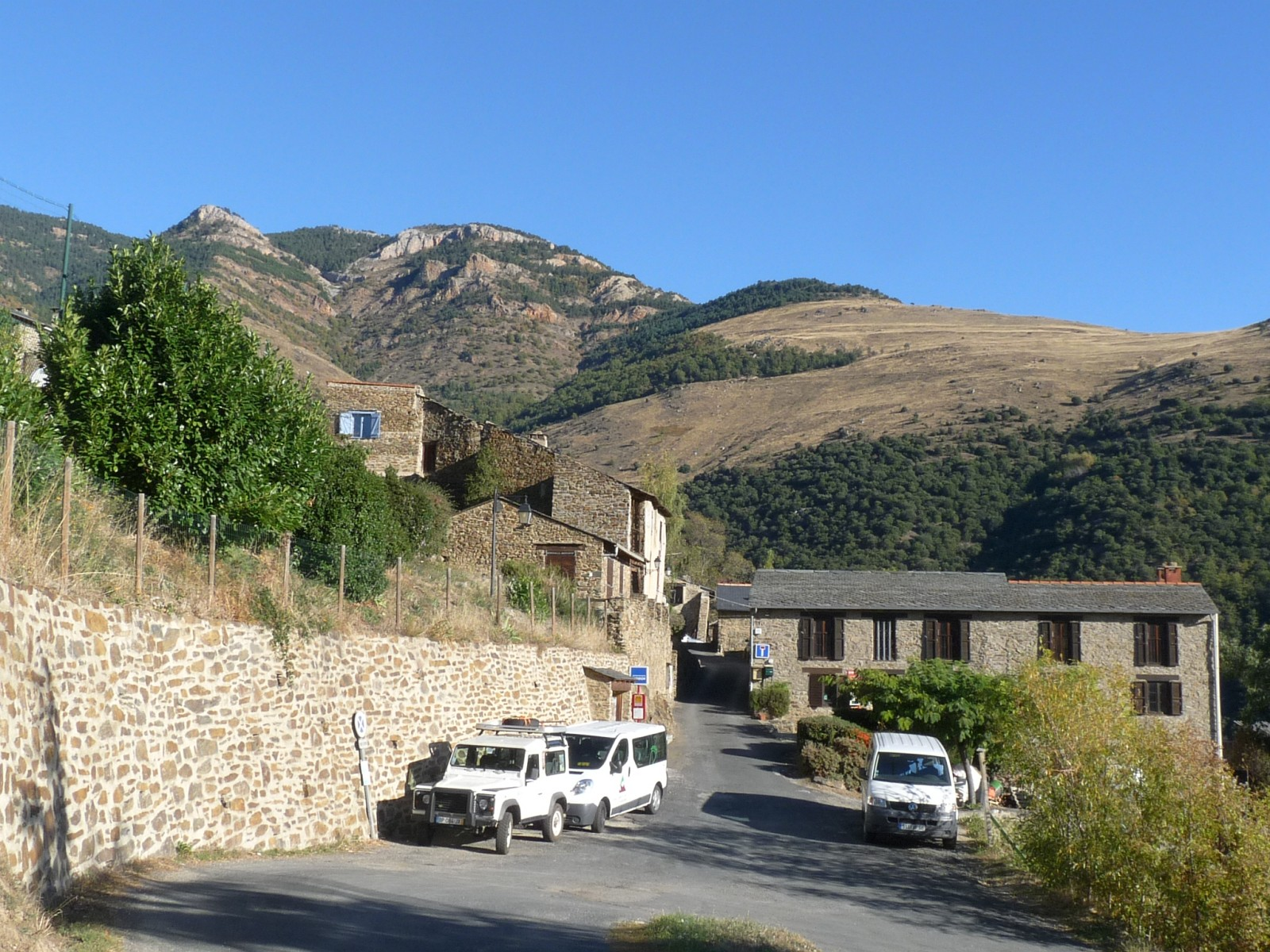
- The road into Jujols, with the town hall to the right
- Location of Jujols
- Location within France Location within Occitanie
- Coordinates: 42°34′18″N 2°17′46″E
- Country: France
- Region: Occitania
- Department: Pyrénées-Orientales
- Arrondissement: Prades
- Canton: Les Pyrénées catalanes

Government
  - Mayor (2020–2026): Yaël Delvigne
- Area^{1}: 10.11 km^{2} (3.90 sq mi)
- Elevation: 940 m (3,080 ft)
- Highest elevation: 2,163 m (7,096 ft)
- Lowest elevation: 570 m (1,870 ft)
- Population (2023): 47
  - Density: 4.6/km^{2} (12/sq mi)
- Time zone: UTC+01:00 (CET)
  - Summer (DST): UTC+02:00 (CEST)
- INSEE/Postal code: 66090 /66360
- ^{1} French Land Register data, which excludes lakes, ponds, glaciers > 1 km^{2} (0.386 sq mi or 247 acres) and river estuaries.

Jujols (French pronunciation: [ʒyʒɔls]; Catalan: Jújols) is a commune in the Pyrénées-Orientales department in southern France.

== Geography ==
Jujols is located in the canton of Les Pyrénées catalanes and in the arrondissement of Prades.

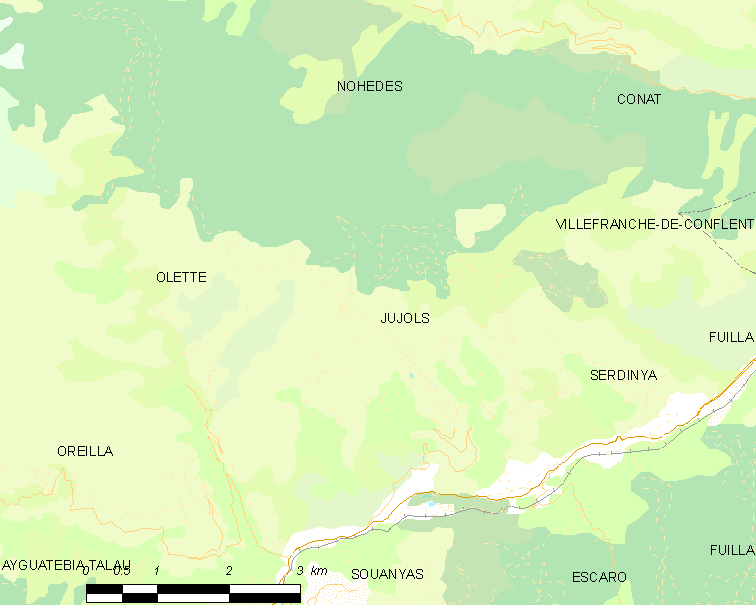
Map of Jujols and its surrounding communes

== Government and politics ==
=== Mayors ===
Mayor	Term start	Term end
Jean-Antoine Jaulent	?	June 1815
Louis Broch	June 1815	?
Jean Jaulent	1955	1977
Jean Battle	1977	1979
Yvon Robert	1979	1987
Olivier Robert	1987	1989
Yvon Robert	1989	1995
Josiane Isnard	1995	2001
Jean-Louis Arcis	2001	2008
Eric Nivet	2008	

== Demography ==
Historical population
Year	Pop.	±% p.a.
1968	18	—
1975	11	−6.79%
1982	36	+18.46%
1990	37	+0.34%
1999	43	+1.68%
2007	56	+3.36%
2012	47	−3.44%
2017	44	−1.31%
2023	47	+1.11%
Source: INSEE

== Sites of interest ==
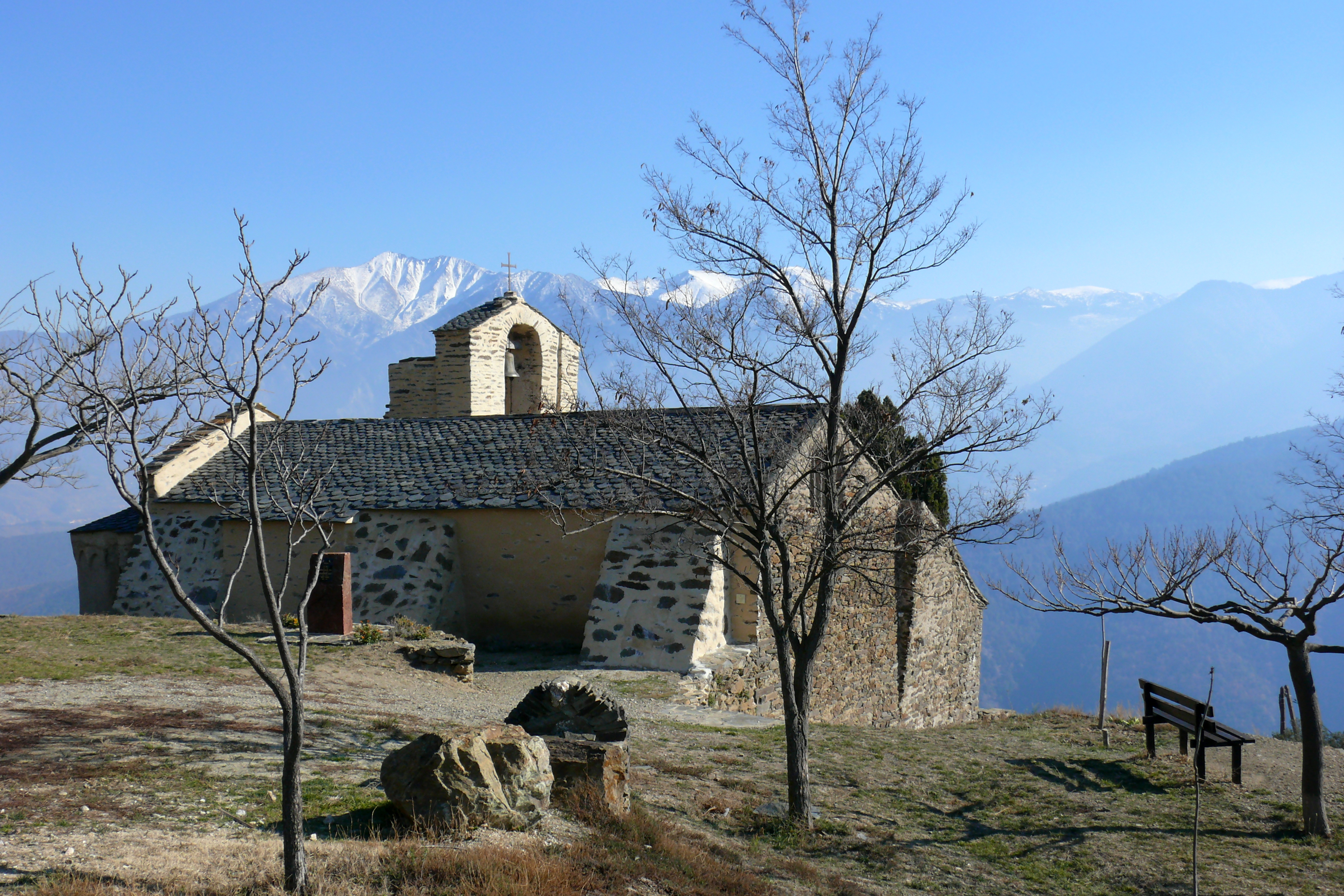
Church Saint-Julien-et-Sainte-Basilisse, with the Canigou in background

- Church Saint-Julien-et-Sainte-Basilisse, from the 11th century.

== See also ==
- Communes of the Pyrénées-Orientales department
