= Wildlife biologist =

Studier of animals and their behavior

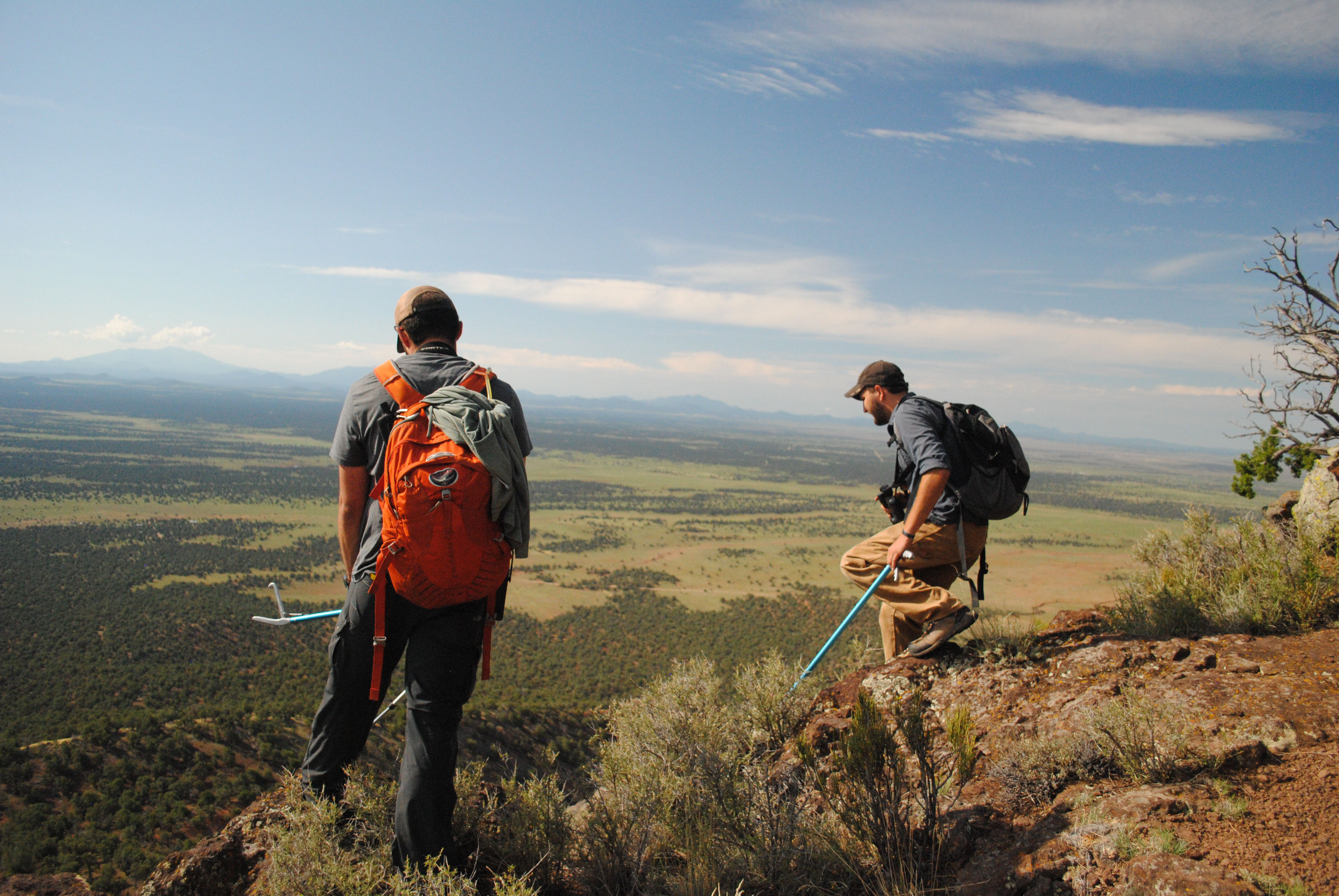
US Forest Service wildlife biologists survey Red Butte in Arizona for rattlesnakes

A wildlife biologist is a biologist who studies animals, their behavior, and the role each plays in its natural habitat. A wildlife biologist typically studies "whole animals", as distinct from a microbiologist, who studies microorganisms, or cellular biologist who studies life at the cellular level, or molecular biologist who studies it at the molecular level.

The duties of a wildlife biologist can include developing and conducting experiments/studies on animals in their natural habitats, studying the characteristics of animals such as their interaction with different species, their reproductive and movement patterns, the dynamic within a population, and the transmission of diseases. Wildlife biologists can also play important roles in managing and monitoring population dynamics to preserve certain species and/or environments. They observe how animals interact with one another as well as how they interact with humans. Some wildlife biologists study the impacts of human interference on an ecosystem. Wildlife biologists can work with endangered species, advocate for preservation of wildlife, resolve issues pertaining to wildlife, and manage animal populations. Many Wildlife Biologists will eventually specialize into a particular area of study defined by ecosystem or species. Some of these fields include: entomology, ornithology, marine biology, and limnology (see below).

Some important qualities in a wildlife biologist are attention to detail, communication skills, critical-thinking skills, interpersonal skills, outdoor skills, and problem-solving skills.

== Education ==
Educational requirements for wildlife biologists typically include tertiary education, such as a bachelor's degree in wildlife biology, zoology, wildlife ecology, or general biology. Many universities offer specialist degrees or courses in wildlife biology. Career progression into research or university-based roles will usually require relevant doctoral qualifications.

In the Netherlands, 54% of their wildlife biologists had only a bachelor's degree.

The U.S Fish and Wildlife Service says that a successful completion of a full 4-year course of study in an accredited college or university leading to a bachelor’s or higher degree in biological science which includes at least 12 semester hours in subjects such as general zoology, invertebrate or vertebrate zoology, comparative anatomy, physiology, genetics, ecology, cellular biology, parasitology, entomology, or research courses in such subjects is required to be hired. It also is a requirement to have at least 9 hours in one of the specialized courses or plant science.

== Annual Pay ==
In the United States, the average pay for a wildlife biologist is $62,290 per year or $29.95 per hour. The top 10% of wildlife biologists can earn up to $99,700 a year. In 2024, the US Department of Labor shows the top 10% of wildlife biologists and Zoologists can earn up to $45,840 per year. According to the US Department of Labor, employment of wildlife biologists and zoologists is predicted to increase by 8% between 2016 and 2026, which is similar to the projected rate of increase in other occupations. The median annual wage for zoologists and wildlife biologists was $64,650 in May 2021. In 2024, according to the US Department of Labor, the median annual wage for Zoologists and Wildlife Biologists is $70,600 of 2024.

As of Wednesday, April 17, 2024, the US Department of Labor Statistics states that Zoologists and Wildlife Biologists employment is expected to grow 3% from 2022 to 2032 which is average for all occupations.

In the United Kingdom, the average wildlife biologist salary is £26,944 or £13 per hour.

For reference, in the Netherlands, the average wildlife biologist salary is €33.727or €16.21 an hour. Although in Greece it is €9,65 an hour.

== Employment ==
According to the U.S Bureau of Labor Statistics, the states with the highest wildlife biologist employments as of 2023 are:

Washington, California, Alaska, Oregon, and Florida. Washington leads with an average wage of $39.40 an hour.

== Wildlife biologist specializations ==
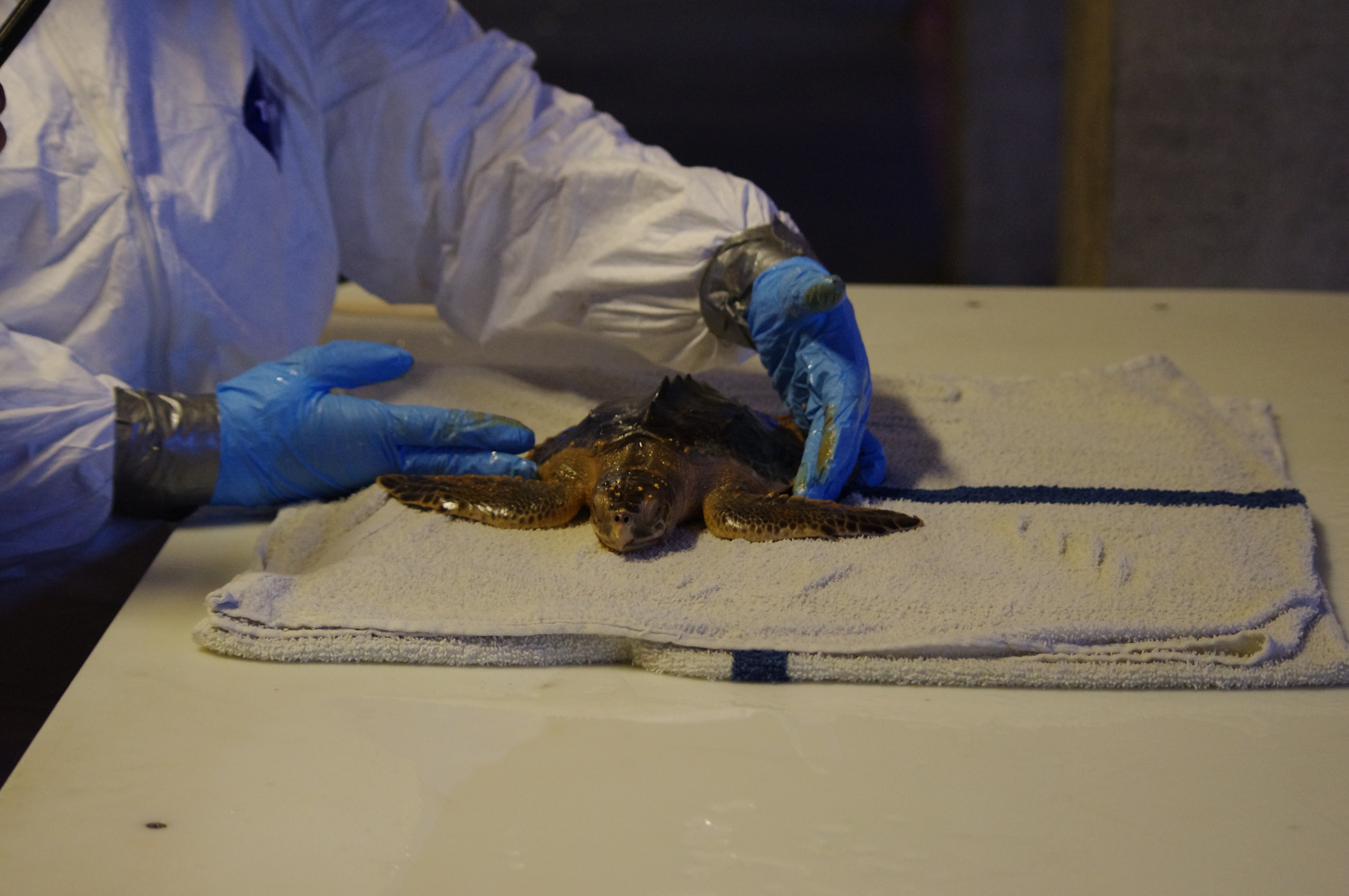
A Louisiana Department of Wildlife and Fisheries biologist attends to a Kemp's ridley sea turtle contaminated by an oil spill in the Gulf of Mexico

- Arachnology - study of arachnids, such as spiders, scorpions, pseudoscorpions, and harvestmen.
- Entomology - study of insects.
- Herpetology - study of amphibians and reptiles.
- Mammalogy - study of mammals.
  - Primatology - study of primates.
- Marine biology - study of marine life, including aquatic plants, aquatic animals, and microorganisms.
  - Limnology - study of inland aquatic ecosystems such as lakes and ponds.
  - Marine mammalogy - study of marine mammals, such as cetaceans, pinnipeds, and sirenians.
    - Cetology - study of whales, dolphins, and porpoises.
  - Ichthyology - study of fish.
  - Malacology - study of mollusks, such as snails and clams.
    - Teuthology - study of cephalopod mollusks, such as octopuses and cuttlefish.
- Ornithology - study of birds.
