= Zumwalt Prairie =

Grassland area in northeast Oregon

- IUCN category V (protected landscape/seascape)
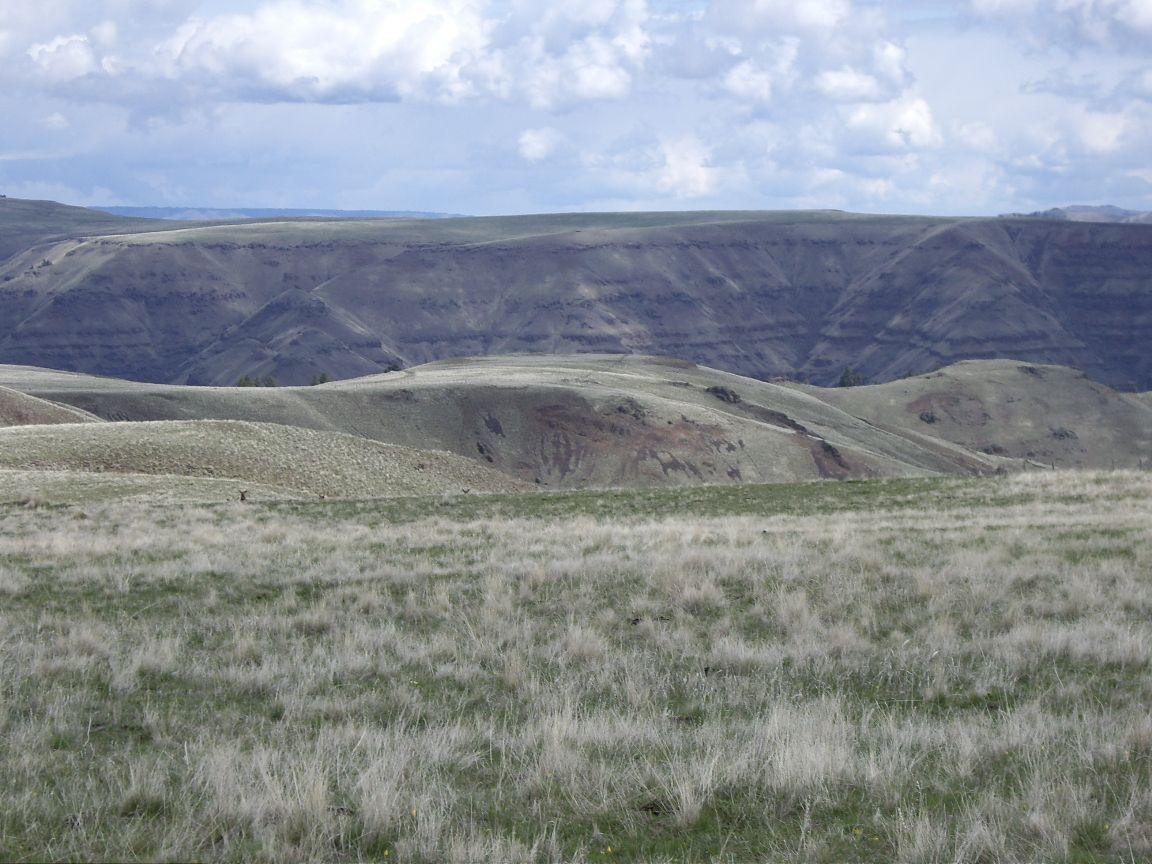
- Zumwalt Prairie landscape

- Location within Oregon
- Location: Wallowa County, Oregon, U.S.
- Nearest city: Enterprise, Oregon
- Coordinates: 45.54°N 117.09°W
- Area: 330,000 acres (130,000 ha)

Zumwalt Prairie is a grassland area located in Wallowa County in northeast Oregon, United States. Measuring 330,000 acres (130,000 ha), much of the land is used for agriculture, with some portions protected as the Zumwalt Prairie Preserve owned by The Nature Conservancy. Part of that portion is designated as a National Natural Landmark. The high elevation prairie is along the west edge of Hells Canyon on the Oregon-Idaho border.

== Geography ==
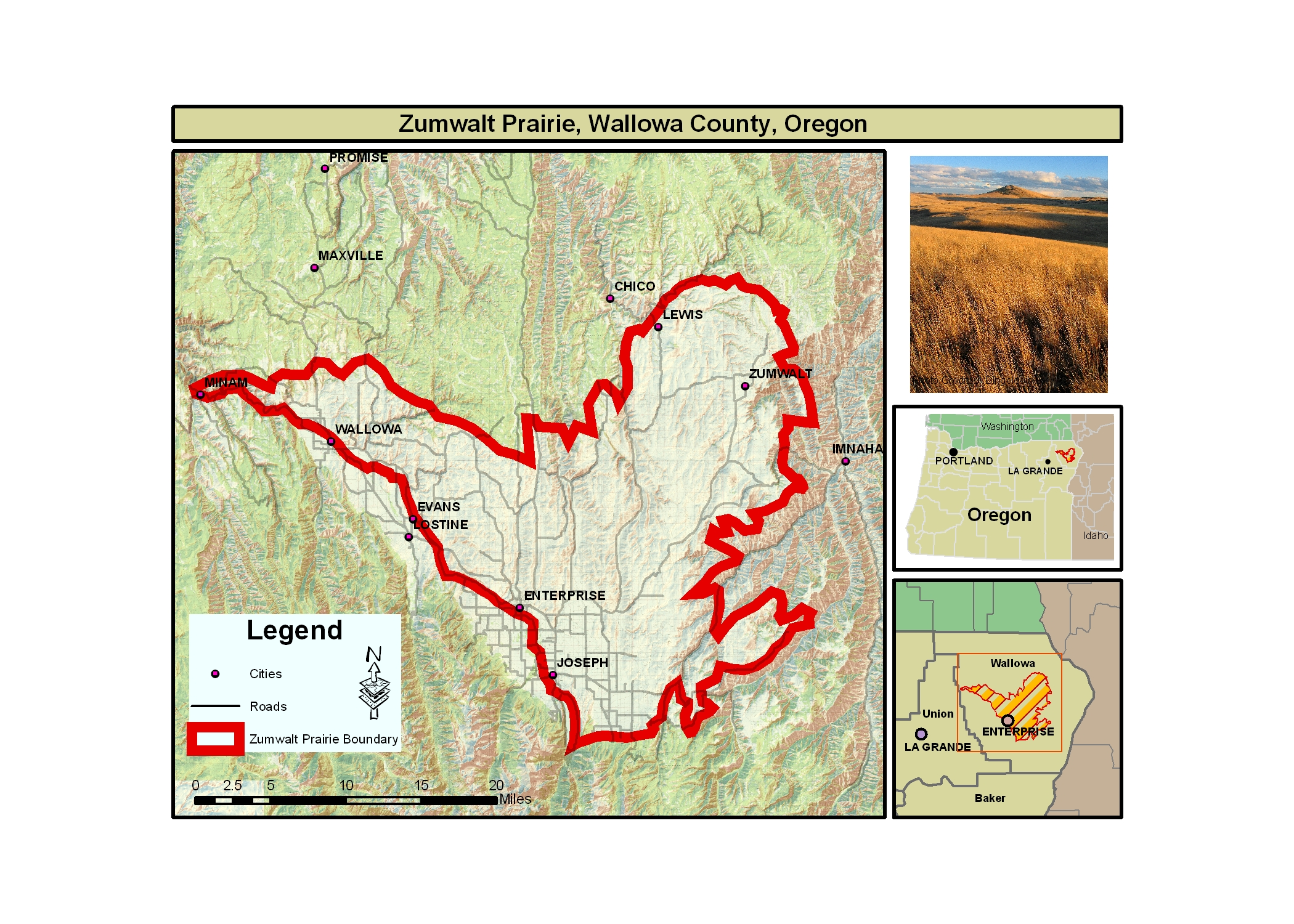
Zumwalt Prairie area map

The Zumwalt Prairie grassland is situated on a basalt plateau which varies in elevation from 3,500 to 5,500 feet (1,100 to 1,700 m) and is dominated by several native bunchgrasses, including Idaho Fescue (Festuca idahoensis), Bluebunch wheatgrass (Pseudoroegneria spicata), Sandberg's Bluegrass (Poa secunda) and many species of wildflowers. The Zumwalt Prairie is a piece of a once extensive temperate grassland system west of the Rocky Mountains which extended into Canada. The Zumwalt Prairie grassland system remains largely intact, unlike most other prairies in North America. This fact can be attributed to its high elevation, harsh climate, and poor soils which made agriculture difficult. Because most of the Zumwalt Prairie escaped the plow, much of the important habitat remains for the plants and animals.

== Wildlife ==
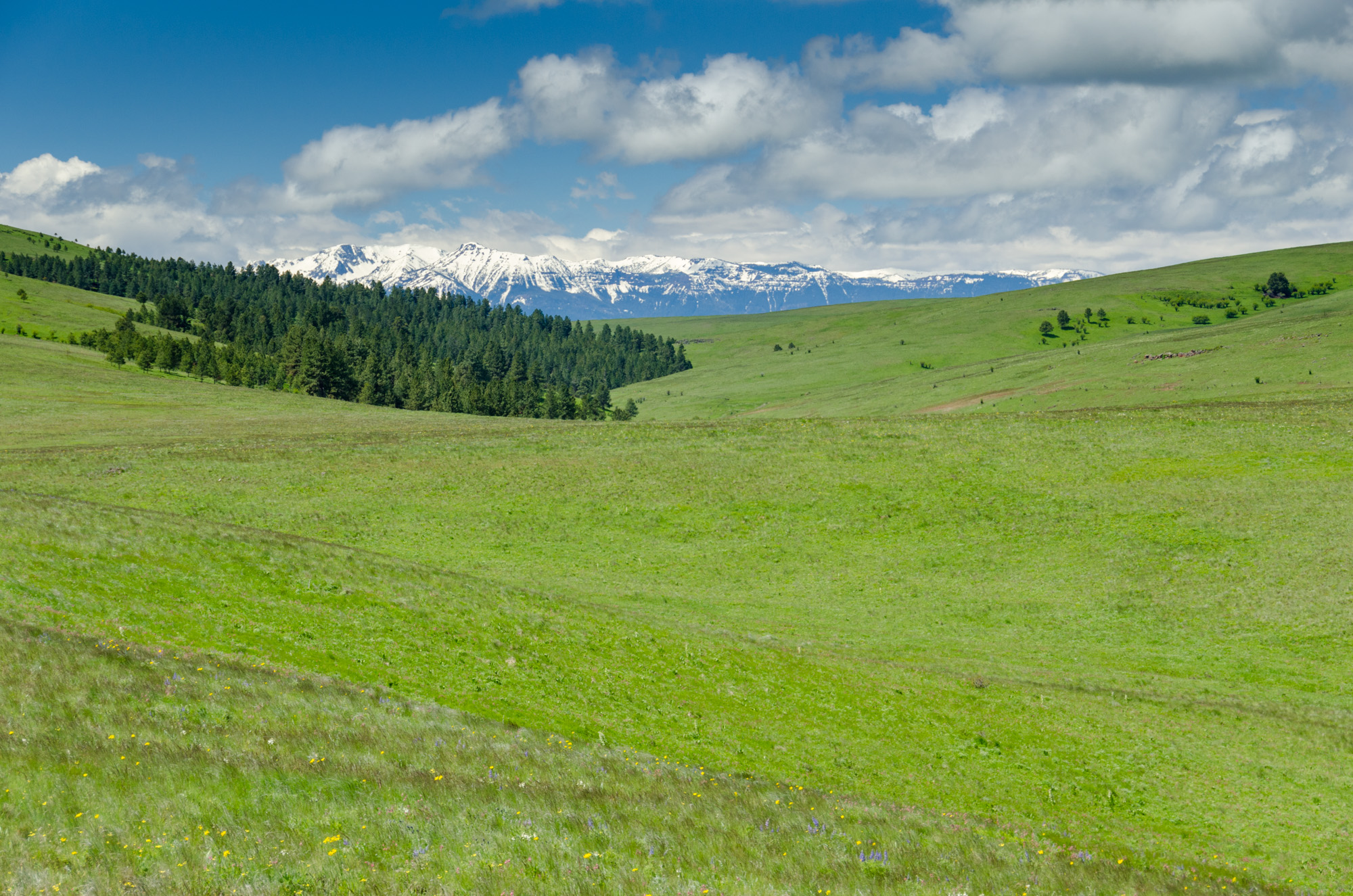
Zumwalt Prairie, Wallowa Mountains in background.

Zumwalt Prairie is home to a diverse array of raptor species and includes the grassland-dependent ferruginous hawk (Buteo regalis), swainson's hawk (Buteo swainsoni), rough-legged hawk (Buteo lagopus), and the red-tailed hawk (Buteo jamaicensis). Golden eagles (Aquila chrysaetos) are a common sight soaring high above the prairie. The Zumwalt also supports important breeding populations of grassland songbirds, including Savannah sparrow (Passerculus sandwichensis), western meadowlark (Sturnella neglecta), vesper sparrow (Pooecetes gramineus), horned lark (Eremophila alpestris) and grasshopper sparrow (Ammodramus savannarum). Grassland birds are highly threatened and many need large areas to maintain viable populations. The Columbian Sharp-tailed Grouse, which had been extirpated from the Zumwalt Prairie by 1947 is being reintroduced in an effort spearheaded by Oregon Department of Fish and Wildlife.

Other wildlife includes Belding's ground squirrels (Spermophilus beldingi), northern pocket gophers (Thomomys talpoides), Rocky mountain elk (Cervus elaphus), mule deer, white tail deer have recently begun migrating to the area as well, black bear (Ursus americanus), cougar (Felis concolor), bobcat (Lynx rufus), badgers and coyotes (Canis latrans) . After an approximately 50-year absence, gray wolves (Canis lupus) have begun to colonize northeastern Oregon and have been seen on the Zumwalt Prairie.

In addition to large vertebrate species, Zumwalt Prairie also is home to a diverse invertebrate community, including over 100 species of bees, which help to maintain the health of the grassland through their role as pollinators.

== Climate ==
The climate of the Zumwalt Prairie is continental and semi-arid. On average the Zumwalt Prairie receives 15 to 17 inches (38 to 43 cm) of precipitation yearly with the majority of the precipitation during winter months. The summer months of July and August are dry with a mean monthly rainfall of 1.25 inches (32 mm) and a mean daily maximum temperature of 84 °F (29 °C). Winters are cold with a mean daily minimum temperature of 16 °F (−9 °C).

== History ==
The Chief Joseph band of the Nez Perce were the original human inhabitants of the Zumwalt Prairie. These indigenous people used the area for hunting and gathering in the spring and fall. Euro-American settlement of the area began in the 1850s. The Nez Perce were forced out of the area in the late 1870s after President Ulysses S. Grant officially opened Wallowa County to white settlement.

In 1903, a post office was opened in the small unincorporated town of Zumwalt. The Zumwalt post office was closed in 1936. Today, Zumwalt is a ghost town.

As of 2008, the prairie consists mostly of privately owned ranches and is used for summer grazing of cattle. In April 2013, the National Park Service designated approximately 4,400 acres (1,800 ha) of The Nature Conservancy's site as a National Natural Landmark.

== Conservation ==
The Nature Conservancy, a non-profit environmental conservation organization, owns and operates a 36,000 acres (15,000 ha) nature preserve on the Zumwalt Prairie, and has undertaken several initiatives to understand and protect the biodiversity of the Zumwalt Prairie's ecosystems. These include biological inventories, ecological monitoring, and scientific research. The Conservancy has a conservation easement on the 12,000-acre (5,000 ha) Lightning Creek Ranch.

== See also ==
- List of protected grasslands of North America
