= Caloplaca himalayana =

Scientific classification
- Domain: Eukaryota
- Kingdom: Fungi
- Division: Ascomycota
- Class: Lecanoromycetes
- Order: Teloschistales
- Family: Teloschistaceae
- Genus: Caloplaca
- Species: C. himalayana

Binomial name
- Caloplaca himalayana Y.Joshi & Upreti (2009)

Species of lichen

Caloplaca himalayana is a species of lignicolous (wood-dwelling) crustose lichen belonging to the family Teloschistaceae. Found in the Himalayas of India, it was described as new to science in 2009. The lichen has a yellowish thallus with rusty red apothecial (fruiting body) discs.

== Taxonomy ==
This species was first named and formally described by the lichenologists Yogesh Joshi and Dalip Kumar Upreti. The type specimen was collected in May 2002 from Rohru, Sungri, in the Shimla district of Himachal Pradesh, India, at an elevation of 2,600 m (8,500 ft) meters, where it was found growing on dead wood.

== Description ==
Caloplaca himalayana features a crust-like (crustose), thin, and continuous growth, which forms an irregular shape with a diameter ranging from 0.4 to 3 cm and a thickness of about 25–30 μm. The lichen's colour is predominantly yellowish. The outer layer (cortex) of the lichen is thin and consists of thin-walled cells arranged in a compact manner (paraplectenchymatous). Its algal layer is even and continuous. The medulla, which is the innermost layer, is white and made of loosely arranged, translucent (hyaline) fungal hyphae, organised in a less compact manner (prosoplectenchymatous). The lichen lacks a bordering growth (prothallus).

The reproductive structures (apothecia) are biatorine in form, typically numerous, and can be scattered or somewhat clustered. They are sessile, meaning they are directly attached without a stalk, and vary from round to angular in shape due to compression. Their size ranges from 0.2 to 1.2 mm in diameter. The apothecia are characterised by a ferruginous red to reddish-brown, glossy disc, surrounded by a smooth, entire, and thin proper margin that is flush with the disc and either the same colour or paler. The lichen lacks a thalline margin. Microscopically, the epihymenium (outermost layer of the apothecium) is golden brown, while the hymenium (spore-producing layer) and hypothecium (layer below the hymenium) are hyaline. The parathecium (layer surrounding the apothecium) consists of elongated cells, and the amphithecium (outer layer of the apothecium) is similar in structure but lacks algae or has them restricted at the base.

The lichen's spores number eight per ascus. They are polaribilocular (divided into two components, or locules, separated by a central septum with a perforation, or isthmus), and range in shape from ellipsoid to broadly ellipsoid to ovoid, measuring 9–11 by 4–7 μm. The connecting isthmus between the spore compartments is 2–4 μm.

== Chemistry ==
Chemical spot tests reveal that the thallus, apothecial disc, and epihymenium turn purple when treated with a solution of potassium hydroxide (K+), and do not react to calcium hypochlorite (C−) or paraphenylenediamine (Pd−). The medulla shows no reaction to these tests (K−, C−, Pd−). Thin-layer chromatography identifies the presence of 7-chloroemodin (a major secondary metabolite) and traces of parietinic acid.

== Similar species ==
Caloplaca himalayana is distinct for its thin, continuous yellowish thallus and ferruginous coloured apothecia. It lacks both a thalline margin and algae in the amphithecium and typically inhabits dead wood. This species could be mistaken for Caloplaca herbidella which differs by being isidiate (having outgrowths). Another species, Opeltia flavorubescens, with deep reddish-brown to brown apothecia, can be challenging to distinguish from C. himalayana but can be distinguished by its thalline margin, presence of algae in the amphithecium, and larger spores.

Several other species share similar habitats and apothecial disc colours but can be differentiated from C. himalayana. These include Blastenia ammiospila, Blastenia ferruginea, Blastenia subathallina, Caloplaca caesiorufella, C. ferrugineofusca, C. jenisejensis, C. spitsbergensis, all of which have endoxylic (growing in wood), poorly to well-developed grey thalli and larger spores. Marchantiana asserigena differs in its grey thallus and small lecanorine to zeorine apothecia, while Opeltia juniperina is distinguished by its squamulose thalli and pale yellow-margined concave apothecia.

== Habitat and distribution ==
Caloplaca himalayana has been found in a few locations within Himachal Pradesh and Jammu and Kashmir in India. This species typically grows on dead wood at elevations between 2,150 and 2,800 m (7,050 and 9,190 ft) in the temperate regions of the Western Himalayas. It was reported from the Haat Kali sacred grove, Central Himalaya, Uttarakhand, in 2010. The localities where Caloplaca himalayana is found share similar lichen compositions, typically including species from the genera Lecanora and Rinodina, as well as a dense coverage of cyanobacterial species.

== See also ==
- List of Caloplaca species
