= Caloplaca streimannii =

Scientific classification
- Kingdom: Fungi
- Division: Ascomycota
- Class: Lecanoromycetes
- Order: Teloschistales
- Family: Teloschistaceae
- Genus: Caloplaca
- Species: C. streimannii

Binomial name
- Caloplaca streimannii S.Y.Kondr. & Kärnefelt (2007)
- Holotype site: Caves Creek, New South Wales

Species of lichen

Caloplaca streimannii is a little-known species of saxicolous (rock-dwelling), crustose lichen in the family Teloschistaceae. Found in New South Wales, Australia, it is characterised by its powdery soredious mass and numerous tiny apothecia (fruiting bodies).

== Taxonomy ==
The lichen was first formally described in 2007 by the lichenologists Sergey Kondratyuk and Ingvar Kärnefelt. The type specimen was collected in New South Wales, specifically at Blue Waterholes in the Caves Creek area, located 42 kilometres (26 mi) west-northwest of Adaminaby. The specimen, found at an altitude of 1,250 m (4,100 ft), was growing on a semi-exposed rock face in limestone outcrops within a grassland. The species epithet honours Heiner Streimann, a prominent and prolific lichen collector in Australia.

== Description ==
The thallus of Caloplaca streimannii typically appears as large citrine-yellow spots on rock surfaces. It is primarily soredious (powdery-like with soredia) with poorly developed areoles that soon become covered by a soredious mass. These areoles are very small, measuring 0.1–0.3 mm wide, and quickly become convex, eventually disintegrating into schizidia-like formations approximately 60–75 μm wide. The convex areole-like formations within the soredious mass are 0.5–1.5 mm wide, divided by cracks 0.1–0.2 mm wide, and vary in colour from yellow to whitish or greenish-yellow, sometimes appearing bluish-grey.

Apothecia are numerous in this species; they measure 0.2–0.5 mm in diameter. They are lecanorine in nature, with a thalline margin that is somewhat shiny and dull brownish-green-yellow or greenish-yellow with white inclusions. The disc is brownish-yellow or greenish-yellow, occasionally with sparse whitish pruina. The hymenium is approximately 60 μm high, underlain by a very thin, hyaline subhymenium.

Ascospores are narrowly ellipsoid, with a relatively thin septum, typically measuring 11–13 by 4–5.5 μm, with the septum being 2–3 μm thick. Conidiomata have not been observed to occur in this species.

Caloplaca streimannii reacts K+ (violetish) when tested with standard chemical spot tests. It contains parietin as a major secondary metabolite (lichen product), as well as minor amounts of erythroglaucin and xanthorin.

== Similar species ==
Caloplaca streimannii resembles Flavoplaca limonia in the colour of its soredious mass, but differs as it does not develop conblastidia and has narrower ascospores. The species is somewhat similar to Candelariella due to the scarce pruina on its apothecia. It also bears resemblance to Caloplaca karadagensis but differs in having smaller ascospores and narrower ascospore septa. Additionally, Caloplaca streimannii shares some similarities with the pantropical species C. cupulifera, but is distinguished by its crateriform eroding soralia.

== Habitat and distribution ==
Caloplaca streimannii grows on limestone outcrops in upland grasslands. At the time of its original publication, Caloplaca streimannii was known only from its type collection in New South Wales.

== See also ==
- List of Caloplaca species
