= Caloplaca lecanorocarpa =

Scientific classification
- Kingdom: Fungi
- Division: Ascomycota
- Class: Lecanoromycetes
- Order: Teloschistales
- Family: Teloschistaceae
- Genus: Caloplaca
- Species: C. lecanorocarpa

Binomial name
- Caloplaca lecanorocarpa Aptroot & M.Cáceres (2016)
- Holotype site: Trail to the Pedra da Galinha Choca, Brazil

Species of lichen

Caloplaca lecanorocarpa is a species of saxicolous (rock-dwelling), crustose lichen in the family Teloschistaceae. Found in Brazil, it was formally described as a new species in 2016 by the lichenologists André Aptroot and Marcela Cáceres. It is named for its overall appearance to lichens in the Lecanora subfusca species complex.

== Description ==
The thallus of Caloplaca lecanorocarpa is crustose (crust-like) and corticate (having a protective outer layer), slightly shiny, and grey in colour. The areoles (small patches on the thallus) range from round to angular, measuring approximately 0.2–1.0 mm in diameter, and rest on a black hypothallus (a layer below the thallus). The thallus is about 100–220 μm thick, with a loosely arranged medulla (inner layer) and a paraplectenchymatous cortex containing atranorin crystals, which are about 10–18 μm thick. The photobiont cells within the lichen are chlorococcoid (round, green algae) and measure roughly 6–11 μm in diameter.

The apothecia (fruiting bodies) are numerous, scattered, and sessile, ranging from 0.4 to 1.0 mm in diameter and 0.3–0.7 mm in height. They have a concave, glossy, chocolate brown disc and a grey, glossy, incurved margin with some incisions, raised significantly above the disc. The margin's cortex is similar in structure to the thallus, while the hymenium (spore-bearing layer) is not inspersed and measures 75–95 μm high. The paraphyses (filamentous structures in the hymenium) are sparingly branched and widen at the tips. Each ascus contains eight hyaline, ellipsoid, polaribilocular ascospores, around twice as long as they are wide, with a septum occupying about half of their length.

Chemical analysis reveals that both the thallus and apothecium margin react positively to a solution of potassium hydroxide (i.e., the K spot test) with a yellow colouration. Thin-layer chromatography shows the presence of atranorin and a terpenoid compound.

== Habitat and distribution ==
Caloplaca lecanorocarpa was first documented in Açude Cedro, Ceará, Brazil, specifically on a vertical gneiss face on an inselberg within Caatinga forest at an elevation of about 250 m (820 ft). It is known to occur only in this region in Brazil and is found growing in association with several other lichen species such as Buellia dejungens, Sucioplaca diplacia, and Thelenella brasiliensis.

== See also ==
- List of Caloplaca species
