= Caloplaca hopetounensis =

Scientific classification
- Kingdom: Fungi
- Division: Ascomycota
- Class: Lecanoromycetes
- Order: Teloschistales
- Family: Teloschistaceae
- Genus: Caloplaca
- Species: C. hopetounensis

Binomial name
- Caloplaca hopetounensis S.Y.Kondr. & Kärnefelt (2009)
- Holotype site: Fitzgerald River National Park

Species of lichen

Caloplaca hopetounensis is a species of crustose lichen in the family Teloschistaceae. Found in Australia, it was formally described as a new species in 2009 by lichenologists Sergey Kondratyuk and Ingvar Kärnefelt. The type specimen was collected from the Shire of Ravensthorpe in Fitzgerald River National Park, where it was found growing on the stems of shrubs, along with the crustose lichen Caloplaca hnatiukii. The species epithet refers to the type locality, which is 6 kilometres (3.7 mi) west of Hopetoun. The lichen is known to occur in several localities in Western Australia, New South Wales, and South Australia.

== See also ==
- List of Caloplaca species
