= Caloplaca magnetensis =

Scientific classification
- Kingdom: Fungi
- Division: Ascomycota
- Class: Lecanoromycetes
- Order: Teloschistales
- Family: Teloschistaceae
- Genus: Caloplaca
- Species: C. magnetensis

Binomial name
- Caloplaca magnetensis S.Y.Kondr., Kärnefelt, Elix & Kalb (2009)
- Holotype site: Great Northern Highway, Western Australia

Species of lichen

Caloplaca magnetensis is a species of corticolous (bark-dwelling) crustose lichen in the family Teloschistaceae. Found in Western Australia, it was formally described as a new species in 2009 by lichenologists Sergey Kondratyuk, Ingvar Kärnefelt, John Elix, and Klaus Kalb. The type specimen was collected along the Great Northern Highway between Mount Magnet and Meekatharra, where it was found growing on the bark of trees and twigs of shrubs. Associated lichen species include Caloplaca erthrosticta, C. beaugleholei, and species of Rinodina and Lecidella. The species epithet magnetensis refers to the type locality.

== See also ==
- List of Caloplaca species
