= Caloplaca fluviatilis =

Scientific classification
- Kingdom: Fungi
- Division: Ascomycota
- Class: Lecanoromycetes
- Order: Teloschistales
- Family: Teloschistaceae
- Genus: Caloplaca
- Species: C. fluviatilis

Binomial name
- Caloplaca fluviatilis Vondrák & I.V.Frolov
- Holotype site: Alash, Republic of Tuva, Siberia

Species of lichen

Caloplaca fluviatilis is a species of saxicolous (rock-dwelling), crustose lichen in the family Teloschistaceae. It is found in the Republic of Tyva in Siberia.

== Taxonomy ==
Caloplaca fluviatilis was formally described in 2019 by the lichenologists Jan Vondrák and Ivan Frolov. This species is distinct from related lineages in the genus Caloplaca due to its unique ecological and morphological characteristics. It belongs to the Caloplaca sensu stricto group, forming a clade within the larger group that includes Caloplaca stillicidiorum lineages. Caloplaca fluviatilis is ecologically distinct from all close lineages of C. stillicidiorum, which are confined to organic substrates. The type specimen of Caloplaca fluviatilis was collected by the authors in Russia, Republic of Tyva, near the village of Ak-Sug. It was found on siliceous rock in the river Mungash-Ak, occasionally inundated with water, at an elevation of 1,120 m (3,670 ft). The species name reflects its ecological preference, as it is found in rivers.

== Description ==
The thallus of Caloplaca fluviatilis is thin, usually less than 100 μm thick, rimose areolate in the centre, and film-like and effuse at the margins, lacking vegetative diaspores. The thallus and lecanorine apothecial margin are typically pale grey, with a low content of Sedifolia-grey pigment. The apothecial disc is pale orange or pale yellow in damp, shady conditions. It is morphologically distinct from other epilithic species in the genus due to the absence of vegetative propagules, pale colouration of the thallus and apothecia, and its film-like effuse thallus.

=== Similar species ===
The species shows a close relation to Caloplaca stillicidiorum, Caloplaca cerina, and Caloplaca chlorina, but differs in specific ecological and morphological traits.

== Habitat and distribution ==
Caloplaca fluviatilis is found on occasionally inundated siliceous boulders in rivers, particularly in damp and shaded sites. It has been found in two locations on the southern slopes of the Western Sayan in the Republic of Tyva, Russia, where it is abundant. It is presumed to be common in the rivers Ak-Sug and Kara-Sug at altitudes of 1,100–1,500 m (3,600–4,900 ft), in a forest steppe zone.

== See also ==
- List of Caloplaca species
