= Caloplaca nothocitrina =

Scientific classification
- Kingdom: Fungi
- Division: Ascomycota
- Class: Lecanoromycetes
- Order: Teloschistales
- Family: Teloschistaceae
- Genus: Caloplaca
- Species: C. nothocitrina

Binomial name
- Caloplaca nothocitrina S.Y.Kondr. et J.-S.Hur (2020)
- Holotype site: Patagonia, Chile

Species of lichen

Caloplaca nothocitrina is a species of saxicolous (rock-dwelling), crustose lichen in the family Teloschistaceae. Its thallus is up to 8 mm in diameter and deep yellow in colour. It comprises small dispersed areoles, occasional concave soralia, and circular apothecia with a bright yellow margin and a dull dark yellowish or brownish disc.

== Taxonomy ==
Caloplaca nothocitrina was formally described by the lichenologists Sergey Kondratyuk and Jae-Seoun Hur in 2020. The type specimens of Caloplaca nothocitrina were collected from Lake Balmaceda and Lake Pinto, Patagonia, Chile. Its species name reflects its distribution in the Southern Hemisphere and its resemblance to the Northern Hemisphere species Flavoplaca citrina.

== Description ==
The thallus of Caloplaca nothocitrina can reach up to 8 mm in diameter and is deep yellow, often with brighter deep yellow apothecia. It has small, dispersed areoles (0.2–0.3 mm in diameter) that are sometimes distant from each other. Soralia (small reproductive propagules) are concave and typically not numerous. The apothecia are circular, measuring between 0.4 and 0.7 mm in diameter. Initially, they have a thick thalline margin that gradually becomes thinner. The margin is bright yellow, while the disc is dull dark yellowish or dull brownish yellow. In section, the apothecia are biatorine, meaning they have algae present only at the base. The exciple (the outermost layer) varies in thickness and colour. Paraphyses are slender structures in the hymenium (the spore-bearing layer) with oil cells and can be up to 5 μm in diameter. Ascospores are elongated and fusiform (threadlike) in shape with attenuated ends and widened at the septum. They measure between 13 and 18 μm in length and 7–9 μm in width.

== Similar species ==
Caloplaca nothocitrina shares morphological traits with several other species. It resembles Flavoplaca citrina in its yellowish thalli but differs in its dispersed areoles and biatorine apothecia with oil-containing paraphyses. Compared to Lazarenkoella polycarpoides, both have elongated ascospores, but Caloplaca nothocitrina features an areolate thallus with wider ascospore septa, while Lazarenkoella polycarpoides has a lobate, non-soredious thallus.

Similarly, Xanthocarpia crenulatella and Caloplaca nothocitrina both have yellowish-orange apothecia, yet they diverge in their thallus colours and the width of their ascospore septa, with C. nothocitrina having a white hypothallus and biatorine apothecia. Xanthocarpia jerramungupensis, while also possessing elongated ascospores, contrasts sharply with C. nothocitrina in its thallus development and apothecial colours.

Caloplaca cupulifera, sharing small soredia with C. nothocitrina, has a greenish-yellow thallus and closely packed areoles, unlike the widely distributed and more yellowish-orange areoles of C. nothocitrina.

Caloplaca cupulifera also shares some similarities with C. nothocitrina. Both species have small, almost indistinct soredia. Caloplaca nothocitrina has a thallus with a more yellowish-orange hue, whereas C. cupulifera typically has a thallus that is greenish yellow or citrine yellow. Furthermore, the areoles of C. nothocitrina are widely distributed and distant from each other, in contrast to C. cupulifera, where they tend to form a nearly continuous thallus. The soralia and soredia of C. nothocitrina are larger than those of C. cupulifera.

== Habitat and distribution ==
Caloplaca nothocitrina is known to grow on rocks in coastal areas, often alongside other lichen species such as Caloplaca nothoholocarpa and other Caloplaca species, Gondwania sublobulata, and Buellia species. It is native to Chile in South America and has been documented in the Patagonian region.

== See also ==
- List of Caloplaca species
