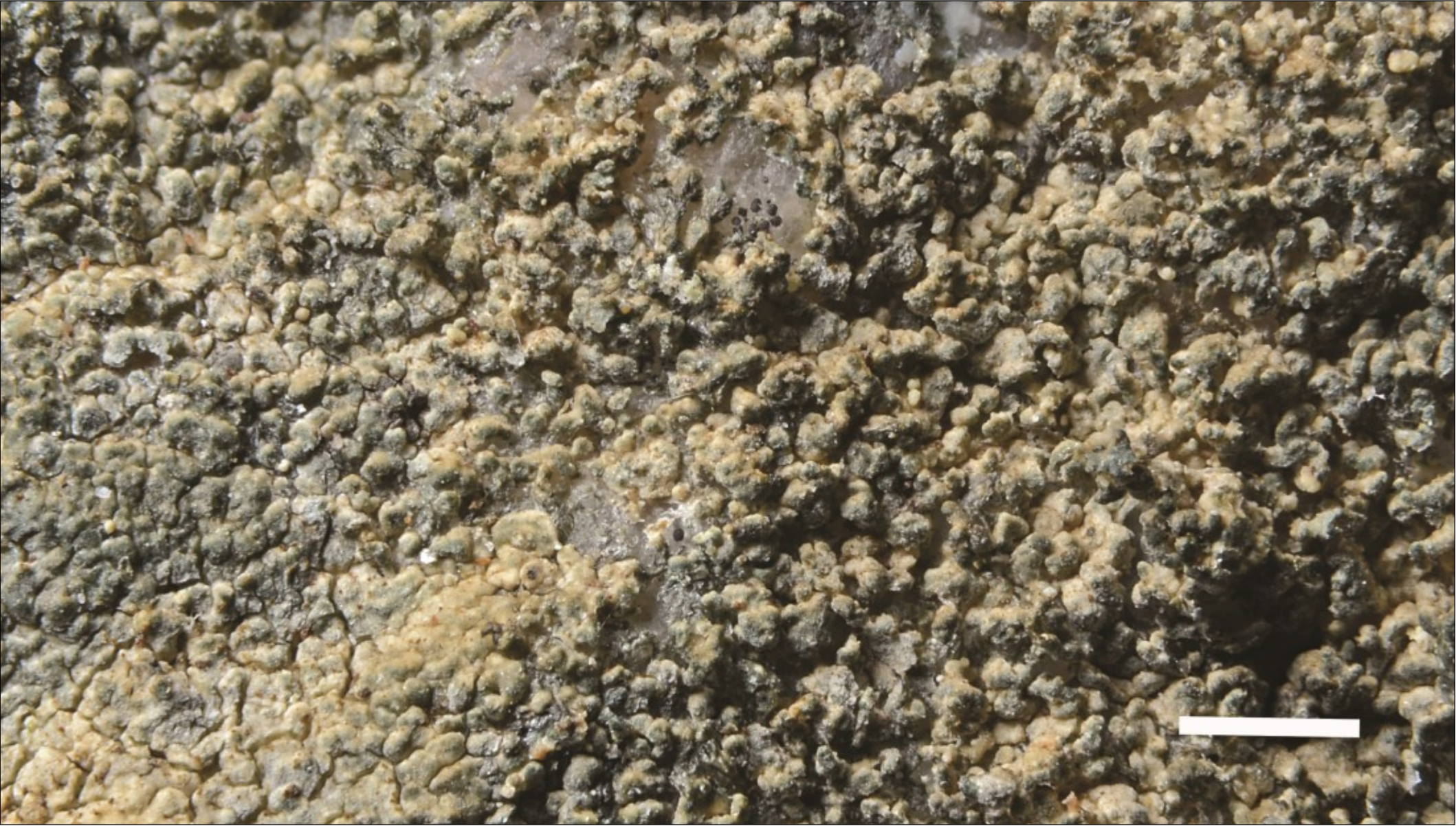
- in Sogn og Fjordane, Norway; scale bar = 1 mm

Scientific classification
- Kingdom: Fungi
- Division: Ascomycota
- Class: Lecanoromycetes
- Order: Teloschistales
- Family: Teloschistaceae
- Genus: Caloplaca
- Species: C. squamuloisidiata

Binomial name
- Caloplaca squamuloisidiata van den Boom & V.J.Rico (2006)

= Caloplaca squamuloisidiata =

Species of lichen

Caloplaca squamuloisidiata is a species of saxicolous (rock-dwelling) crustose lichen in the family Teloschistaceae. Described as a new species in 2006, it is found in southwestern and northern Europe.

== Taxonomy ==
The species was formally described as new to science in 2006 by the lichenologists Pieter van den Boom and Víctor Rico. Its specific epithet squamuloisidiata refers to two of its distinctive features: the squamulose (scale-like) thallus and the presence of isidia (vegetative reproductive structures). The species belongs to the genus Caloplaca, a large group of mostly orange or yellow lichens, though C. squamuloisidiata itself is pale green to grey with olivaceous patches. C. squamuloisidiata has a morphology that broadly aligns with that of the Caloplaca cerina group, although it does not belong in the Caloplaca cerina clade.

It is morphologically similar to Caloplaca chlorina but can be distinguished by several features, including its true isidia, paraplectenchymatous arrangement of hyphae (cells arranged in a tissue-like manner), and slightly larger conidia.

== Description ==
Caloplaca squamuloisidiata has a distinctive crustose thallus that is rimose-areolate to squamulose-isidiate, often with a defined outline. The thallus appears pale green to greyish or pale grey with dark olivaceous patches. Its margins feature small lobules (0.5–0.7 mm long) that frequently develop into isidia—vegetative reproductive structures that are cylindrical to flattened, simple to branched or coralloid. The upper cortex is well-developed and paraplectenchymatous, while a thin, usually visible prothallus appears white to brown around the thallus.

The reproductive structures include rare lecanorine apothecia (fruiting bodies) measuring 0.2–0.8 mm in diameter with pale to dark orange discs. The rim (thalline exciple) matches the thallus colour and can be smooth to somewhat granular or isidiate. Microscopically, the species has colourless, polarilocular ascospores measuring 10–13 by 5–8 μm and produces simple, rod-shaped conidia from inconspicuous pycnidia immersed in the thallus. When tested chemically, the thallus shows no reaction to standard chemical spot tests, though pigmented parts turn purplish with potassium hydroxide solution.

== Habitat and distribution ==
Caloplaca squamuloisidiata is known from four localities in the Iberian Peninsula: two in Portugal (Trás-os-Montes e Alto Douro and Alentejo provinces) and two in Spain (Cáceres province). It grows on acidic rocks, including quartzite, granite, and sandstone, in inland areas at elevations from 200 to 1,000 metres. In 2021, it was reported from the Gaupne area of Sogn og Fjordane, Norway, a biodiversity hotpot for lichens.

The species prefers shaded and sheltered rock faces, which are often slightly overhung and exposed to the north. It occurs in various vegetation zones of the Mediterranean region, from the thermomediterranean belt (in Alentejo, Portugal) to the mesomediterranean (in Cáceres, Spain) and supramediterranean belts (in Trás-os-Montes province, Portugal). The lichen is often found growing with other species such as Acarospora epithallina, A. hilaris, Caloplaca demissa, Ochrolechia androgyna, Ramalina pollinaria, Rinodina confragosa, Solenopsora vulturiensis, and various others, depending on the locality.

== See also ==
- List of Caloplaca species
