= Caloplaca lecapustulata =

Scientific classification
- Kingdom: Fungi
- Division: Ascomycota
- Class: Lecanoromycetes
- Order: Teloschistales
- Family: Teloschistaceae
- Genus: Caloplaca
- Species: C. lecapustulata

Binomial name
- Caloplaca lecapustulata Aptroot & M.Cáceres (2016)
- Holotype: Açude Cedro, Brazil

Species of lichen

Caloplaca lecapustulata is a species of saxicolous (rock-dwelling), crustose lichen in the family Teloschistaceae. Found in Brazil, it was described as a new species in 2016.

== Taxonomy ==
Caloplaca lecapustulata was formally described as a new species by the lichenologists André Aptroot and Marcela Cáceres. The type specimen was collected by the authors in Brazil, within the state of Ceará at Açude Cedro, specifically along the trail of Pedra da Galinha. This collection took place on a gneiss inselberg (an isolated hill rising abruptly from a plain) within the Caatinga biome, at an elevation of about 250 m (820 ft) above sea level.

== Description ==
Caloplaca lecapustulata is characterised by a crustose (crust-like), corticate, and slightly shiny thallus (the main body of the lichen) that is grey in colour. It features areolae (small, distinct areas) that can appear bullate (blistered) to somewhat flattened or slightly folded, ranging from round to angular shapes, each about 0.2 to 1.0 mm in diameter, situated on a black base layer known as the hypothallus. The thickness of the thallus is approximately 100 to 220 μm, with a loosely structured medulla (internal layer) and a cortex (outer layer) that is paraplectenchymatous (composed of tightly packed cells) and contains tiny crystals of a substance called atranorin, measuring about 10 to 18 μm thick. The lichen houses chlorococcoid algae, with cells measuring about 6 to 11 μm in diameter. This species does not produce vegetative propagules (asexual reproductive structures).

The apothecia (fruiting bodies) of Caloplaca lecapustulata are numerous, spread out, and sessile (attached directly by their base), with a concave, chocolate brown, glossy disc that ranges from 0.4 to 1.0 mm in diameter and 0.3 to 0.7 mm in height. The margins are grey, glossy, and incurved with some incisions, significantly elevated above the disc and about 0.2 mm wide. Similar to the thallus, the cortex around the margin of the apothecium is filled with atranorin crystals, and the medulla in this area contains algae. The hymenium (spore-bearing layer) is about 75 to 95 μm high, with a colourless excipulum (outer layer of the apothecium), a clear subhymenium (base layer below the hymenium) measuring about 50 to 75 μm high, and a brown epihymenium (top layer of the hymenium) about 7 to 12 μm high. The paraphyses (filamentous structures within the hymenium) are sparingly branched at the tips and widen towards the end.

The ascospores, numbering eight per ascus (spore-producing sac), are hyaline (transparent), ellipsoid in shape, and measure 10.0 to 12.5) by 5.0 to 5.5 μm. They are about twice as long as they are wide, with a septum (dividing partition) that is about 5.0 to 5.5 μm thick, occupying roughly half the length of the ascospore. Pycnidia (asexual reproductive structures that produce pycnidiospores) have not been observed to occur in this species.

== Habitat and distribution ==
Caloplaca lecapustulata is found on vertical faces of gneiss inselbergs within the Caatinga forest, a biome unique to Brazil, where this species is exclusively known to exist. It shares its habitat with a diverse group of lichen species, including Buellia dejungens, B. halonia, B. mamillana, Sucioplaca diplacia, Caloplaca leptozona, C. ochraceofulva, C. subsoluta, C. cf araguana, Dirinaria applanata, the Flavoplaca citrina species aggregate, Heterodermia tremulans, Lecanora subimmergens, L. sulfurescens, Parmotrema praesorediosum, Physcia sorediosa, Pyxine minuta, P. petricola, and Thelenella brasiliensis.

== See also ==
- List of Caloplaca species
