= Caloplaca ulleungensis =

Scientific classification
- Kingdom: Fungi
- Division: Ascomycota
- Class: Lecanoromycetes
- Order: Teloschistales
- Family: Teloschistaceae
- Genus: Caloplaca
- Species: C. ulleungensis

Binomial name
- Caloplaca ulleungensis S.Y.Kondr., Lőkös & J.-S.Hur (2020)
- Holotype site: Ulleungdo Island, South Korea

Species of lichen

Caloplaca ulleungensis is a species of saxicolous (rock-dwelling), crustose lichen in the family Teloschistaceae. It is found in South Korea, particularly on Ulleungdo and Jeju Islands.

== Taxonomy ==
The lichen was first formally described in 2020 by the lichenologists Sergey Kondratyuk, László Lőkös, and Jae-Seoun Hur. The type specimen was collected by the first two authors from Jeodong-ri (Ulleung County, North Gyeongsang Province) at an elevation of 285 m (935 ft), where it was found growing on a rock wall. The species is named after its type locality, Ulleungdo Island in the Republic of Korea.

== Description ==
The thallus of Caloplaca ulleungensis is crustose, overgrowing rock surfaces and sometimes bryophyte thalli and plant remnants. It appears dull yellowish, greyish, or whitish-grey and is often cracked into very small portions, creating a rough granulated surface texture. The thallus lacks vegetative propagules and has a black prothallus line along its edge.

Apothecia (fruiting bodies) are 0.2–1.1 mm in diameter and up to 0.35 mm thick. They have a dark brown disc with a dull yellow or yellow-orange margin, resembling the types found in Brigantiaea or Letrouitia. The apothecia are biatorine, with the true exciple being paraplectenchymatous and the hymenium reaching 100–180 μm in height. The ascospores are fusiform (spindle-shaped) with attenuated ends, often becoming yellowish, orange, or brownish, and vary in size and septum width.

Pycnidia are immersed in the thallus, with bacilliform conidia measuring approximately 2.6–3.0 by 1.0–1.1 μm.

== Similar species ==
Caloplaca ulleungensis resembles Caloplaca kedrovopadensis but differs in several aspects, including larger apothecia, a paraplectenchymatous true exciple, a higher hymenium, thicker subhymenium, and larger ascospores with a wider septum. It is also similar to C. fusanii known from Korea and Japan, but differs in ascospore dimensions and septum width. Its resemblance to Xanthocarpia jerramungupensis has been noted, but it differs in several anatomical aspects. In appearance, it resembles species of the genera Brigantiaea or Letrouiti but differs in its asci and bipolar ascospores.

== Habitat and distribution ==
Caloplaca ulleungensis is known from Ulleungdo and Jeju Islands in South Korea, where it grows on siliceous rock.

== See also ==
- List of Caloplaca species
