= Caloplaca papanui =

Scientific classification
- Domain: Eukaryota
- Kingdom: Fungi
- Division: Ascomycota
- Class: Lecanoromycetes
- Order: Teloschistales
- Family: Teloschistaceae
- Genus: Caloplaca
- Species: C. papanui

Binomial name
- Caloplaca papanui D.J.Galloway (2004)

Species of lichen

Caloplaca papanui is a species of saxicolous (rock-dwelling) crustose lichen in the family Teloschistaceae. The species was described in 2004 from specimens collected at Papanui Inlet on the Otago Peninsula. It is characterised by its cream-white thallus forming small rosettes and minute golden-yellow apothecia (fruiting bodies) with narrowly ellipsoid ascospores. C. papanui grows on hard coastal rocks in the upper intertidal zone, distributed along the south-eastern coasts of New Zealand's main islands from Wellington to Otago.

== Taxonomy ==
David J. Galloway described the species in 2004 after examining a collection from the northern margin of Papanui Inlet on the Otago Peninsula. The holotype specimen was gathered on New Year's Day 1996 by P. N. Johnson from schist blocks forming part of an old causeway that margins the estuary–salt-marsh ecotone at Papanui Inlet, barely a metre above high-tide level. Galloway coined the species epithet papanui to anchor the species to this type locality. Within the large and morphologically diverse genus Caloplaca, the new taxon was placed among the pale-thallus coastal oranges because of its saxicolous habit, yellow apothecia and narrowly ellipsoid, thin-septate ascospores. It most closely recalls the circumpolar alpine species C. approximata, but that taxon develops bright-orange discs and a virtually thallus-less crust; by contrast, C. papanui has a discrete, cream-white thallus and duller yellow apothecia.

== Description ==
The thallus forms scattered to coalescing rosettes 0.5–1.5 cm across, although adjacent colonies often merge into mats up to 6 cm in greatest dimension. A fibrous, spider-web-like prothallus fringes each patch. The upper surface is cream-fawn, sometimes blotched green-white when wet, and is broken into minute angular blocks (areoles) only 0.1–0.4 mm wide, separated by deep fissures; occasional patches show a continuous crust that under a hand-lens appears finely papillate. Standard potassium hydroxide solution spot tests are negative.

Minute apothecia (0.1–0.6, rarely 0.8 mm in diameter) arise singly or in loose clusters near the thallus centre. They are sessile, round to faintly contorted, with plane to gently convex discs that turn golden-yellow when moist and dry to a matt yellow. A thalline rim is seldom visible, persisting merely as pale granules, while the proper margin is entire, slightly elevated and paler than the disc. Internally, the epithecium is a granular yellow layer 8–12 micrometres (μm) thick; the hymenium is colourless, lacks oil globules and stands 45–60 μm tall. Cylindrical to club-shaped asci (40–55 × 10–13.5 μm) each contain eight biseriate spores. These ascospores are narrowly ellipsoid, 10–15 × 5–6.5 μm, with a very thin median wall (about 1.5–2 μm), so slender that under light microscopy they can appear almost unseptate.

== Habitat and distribution ==
Caloplaca papanui occupies hard coastal rock kept damp by wave splash and salt spray. It grows in the upper intertidal or just above high-tide level, frequently overgrowing the black, tar-like crusts of Hydropunctaria maura and mingling with orange Caloplaca species and the strap lichen Xanthoria ligulata. Confirmed records extend from exposed shores around Wellington southwards to Otago, indicating a south-eastern distribution on both main islands, though its minute size and pale thallus mean it is easily overlooked.

Field surveys suggest the lichen tolerates periodic submersion and prolonged sun-drying, growing where run-off drains across firm greywacke or schist. Its apparently patchy distribution may reflect genuine local rarity or, more plausibly, a lack of close inspection in New Zealand's extensive "orange zone" of maritime teloschistacean lichens.

== See also ==
- List of Caloplaca species
