= Caloplaca pseudocitrina =

Scientific classification
- Kingdom: Fungi
- Division: Ascomycota
- Class: Lecanoromycetes
- Order: Teloschistales
- Family: Teloschistaceae
- Genus: Caloplaca
- Species: C. pseudocitrina

Binomial name
- Caloplaca pseudocitrina Khodosovtsev & Kudratov (2002)

Species of lichen

Caloplaca pseudocitrina, a little-known species of lichen saxicolous (rock-dwelling) lichen in the family Teloschistaceae. Found in southern Tajikistan, it has a squamulose (scaley) thallus forming extensive yellow-orange spots. It was formally described as a new species in 2002 by the lichenologists Imomnazar Kudratov and Oleksandr Khodosovtsev.

== Taxonomy ==
Caloplaca pseudocitrina is a part of the Caloplaca citrina species complex, which, at the time its original publication, had not yet been resolved taxonomically. It is distinguished from Caloplaca citrina (in the broad sense) by its larger ascospores coupled with a narrow septum (internal partition). Similar taxa like C. citrina var. arcis, known only in a sterile state, and soil-dwelling relatives C. heterospora and C. tominii, also have narrow spore septa but differ in other morphological aspects.

== Description ==
The thallus of Caloplaca pseudocitrina is squamulose, forming expansive spots that can reach several centimetres in diameter. The squamules are yellow-orange, flat to undulate, and range from 0.2 to 2.0 mm in size. These squamules, either solitary or composed of 3–6 microlobes, attach centrally to the substrate with somewhat free margins and are sorediate. The cortex is paraplectenchymatous, measuring 18–24 μm in thickness, with cells around 4.8–7.2 μm. Soralia are typically developed at the edges of the squamules, with granular, yellow-orange soredia measuring 30–50 μm in diameter.

Apothecia in this species are zeorine to biatorine, ranging from 0.2 to 1.2 mm in width, generally one or two per squamule. The disc varies from concave to convex, orange in colour, with a yellow-orange margin. The proper margin is prosoplectenchymatous, thickening from 15 to 20 μm in the centre to 90–110 μm laterally. The thalline margin is poorly developed. The epithecium is yellowish, about 10 μm high. The hypothecium is hyaline and measures 30–50 μm in height. The hymenium stands 40–60 μm tall. Paraphyses are unbranched to apically branched, 1.8–2.2 μm wide, with apical cells reaching 3.6–4.5 μm in width. Asci contain eight spores each. The photobiont is from the green algal genus Trebouxia, with cells measuring 6.0–12.0 μm in diameter.

== Habitat and distribution ==
This species has so far been observed growing on metamorphic limestone in the arid regions of southern Tajikistan at high altitudes, particularly in the Chormagzak pass, "Schirbibi" locality, at an elevation of around 1,850 m (6,070 ft).

== See also ==
- List of Caloplaca species
