= Caloplaca norfolkensis =

Scientific classification
- Kingdom: Fungi
- Division: Ascomycota
- Class: Lecanoromycetes
- Order: Teloschistales
- Family: Teloschistaceae
- Genus: Caloplaca
- Species: C. norfolkensis

Binomial name
- Caloplaca norfolkensis Elix, S.Y.Kondr. & Kärnefelt (2009)
- Holotype site: Norfolk Island

Species of lichen

Caloplaca norfolkensis is a species of saxicolous (rock-dwelling), crustose lichen in the family Teloschistaceae. Found in Australia, it was formally described as a new species in 2009 by lichenologists John Elix, Sergey Kondratyuk, and Ingvar Kärnefelt. The species epithet combines the name of the type locality with the suffix -ensis ("place of origin"). The lichen grows on trunks and branches of Araucaria, and old fence posts. In addition to Norfolk Island, it has also been recorded from Lord Howe Island and southeastern Queensland.

== See also ==
- List of Caloplaca species
