= Caloplaca albovariegata =

Scientific classification
- Domain: Eukaryota
- Kingdom: Fungi
- Division: Ascomycota
- Class: Lecanoromycetes
- Order: Teloschistales
- Family: Teloschistaceae
- Genus: Caloplaca
- Species: C. albovariegata

Binomial name
- Caloplaca albovariegata (B.de Lesd.) Wetmore (1995)

Synonyms
- Pyrenodesmia albovariegata B.de Lesd. (1942)

Species of lichen

Caloplaca albovariegata, the variegated orange lichen, is a gray, blue-gray, or dark green crustose areolate lichen that grows on rocks in areas of western North America such as Arizona and California. It is common in the Mojave Desert. It has no prothallus. It is in the genus Caloplaca in the family Teloschistaceae. It is similar to Caloplaca peliophylla, which has lighter brown apothecial discs and a narrower spore isthmus.

== See also ==
- List of Caloplaca species
