= Caloplaca littorea =

Scientific classification
- Domain: Eukaryota
- Kingdom: Fungi
- Division: Ascomycota
- Class: Lecanoromycetes
- Order: Teloschistales
- Family: Teloschistaceae
- Genus: Caloplaca
- Species: C. littorea

Binomial name
- Caloplaca littorea Tav. (1956)

Species of lichen

Caloplaca littorea is a species of saxicolous (rock-dwelling) crustose lichen in the family Teloschistaceae. It was described as a new species in 1956 by the Portuguese lichenologist Carlos das Neves Tavares. This maritime lichen has been recorded from Portugal and the British Isles.

== See also ==
- List of Caloplaca species
