= Caloplaca tropica =

Scientific classification
- Domain: Eukaryota
- Kingdom: Fungi
- Division: Ascomycota
- Class: Lecanoromycetes
- Order: Teloschistales
- Family: Teloschistaceae
- Genus: Caloplaca
- Species: C. tropica

Binomial name
- Caloplaca tropica Y.Joshi & Upreti (2007)

Species of lichen

Caloplaca tropica is a species of saxicolous (rock-dwelling), crustose lichen in the family Teloschistaceae. It was first described by the lichenologists Yogesh Joshi and Dalip Kumar Upreti in 2007 from specimens collected in Madhya Pradesh, central India. The species belongs to the Sideritis group within the genus Caloplaca. The holotype specimen was collected from exposed rocks in the Rang Mahal area of Bhimbetka rock shelters, a World Heritage Site in Raisen district.

== Description ==
Caloplaca tropica is an inconspicuous crustose lichen characterised by its extremely thin, pale grey thallus (the main body of the lichen) which is often barely visible or restricted to the base of its fruiting bodies. The fruiting bodies (apothecia) are numerous and can appear either scattered across the surface or clustered in small groups of three to five. These apothecia measure 0.2–0.5 mm across, occasionally reaching 0.6 mm, and are firmly attached to the surface without stalks. The apothecia have distinctive orange to brownish-orange centres (discs) surrounded by prominent black, glossy margins. These margins are initially thick and regular but may become wavy (flexuose) and thinner as the apothecia mature. The internal structure shows a golden to golden-brown upper layer containing dense granular deposits.

When examined microscopically, the spores are distinctively thin and shaped like spindles or sickles, measuring approximately 9–12 micrometres (μm) long and 1.5–2 μm wide, with a narrow connecting bridge (isthmus) between the two cells. The species produces parietin, a secondary metabolite that turns purple when potassium hydroxide solution (the K spot test) is applied.

== Habitat and distribution ==
Caloplaca tropica grows on sun-exposed quartzite rocks in the dry tropical regions of central India, typically at elevations between 500–600 metres above sea level. It is often found growing alongside other lichen species including Caloplaca cinnabarina, C. poliotera, C. orissensis, and various Buellia species.

== See also ==
- List of Caloplaca species
