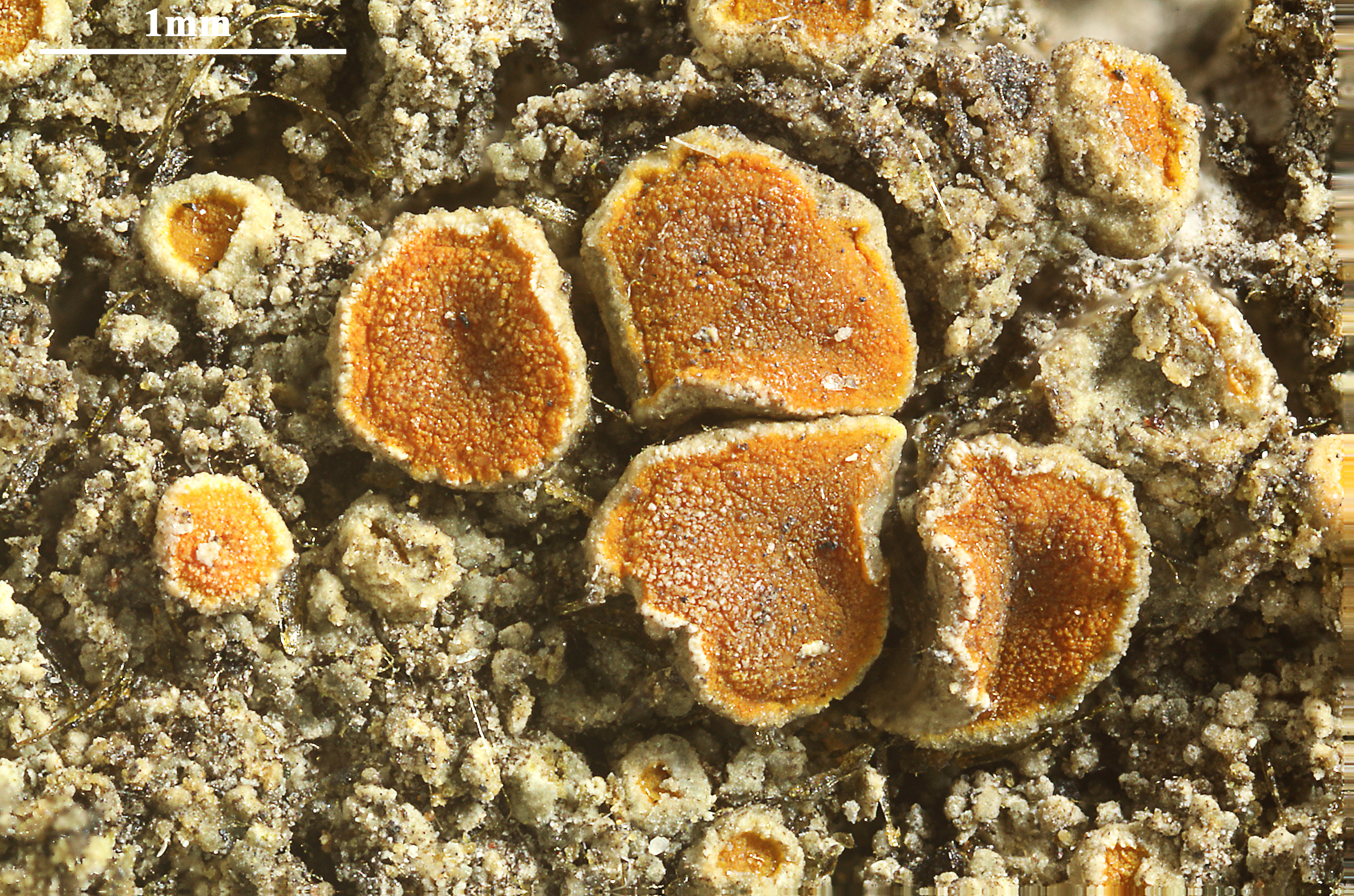

Scientific classification
- Domain: Eukaryota
- Kingdom: Fungi
- Division: Ascomycota
- Class: Lecanoromycetes
- Order: Teloschistales
- Family: Teloschistaceae
- Genus: Caloplaca
- Species: C. monacensis

Binomial name
- Caloplaca monacensis (Leder.) Lettau (1912)

Synonyms
- Pyrenodesmia monacensis Leder. (1896)

= Caloplaca monacensis =

Species of lichen

Caloplaca monacensis is a species of crustose lichen in the family Teloschistaceae. Originally described in 1896 by the German lichenologist Michael Lederer as a member of Pyrenodesmia, Georg Lettau reclassified it in Caloplaca in 1912. It occurs in Europe.

== See also ==
- List of Caloplaca species
