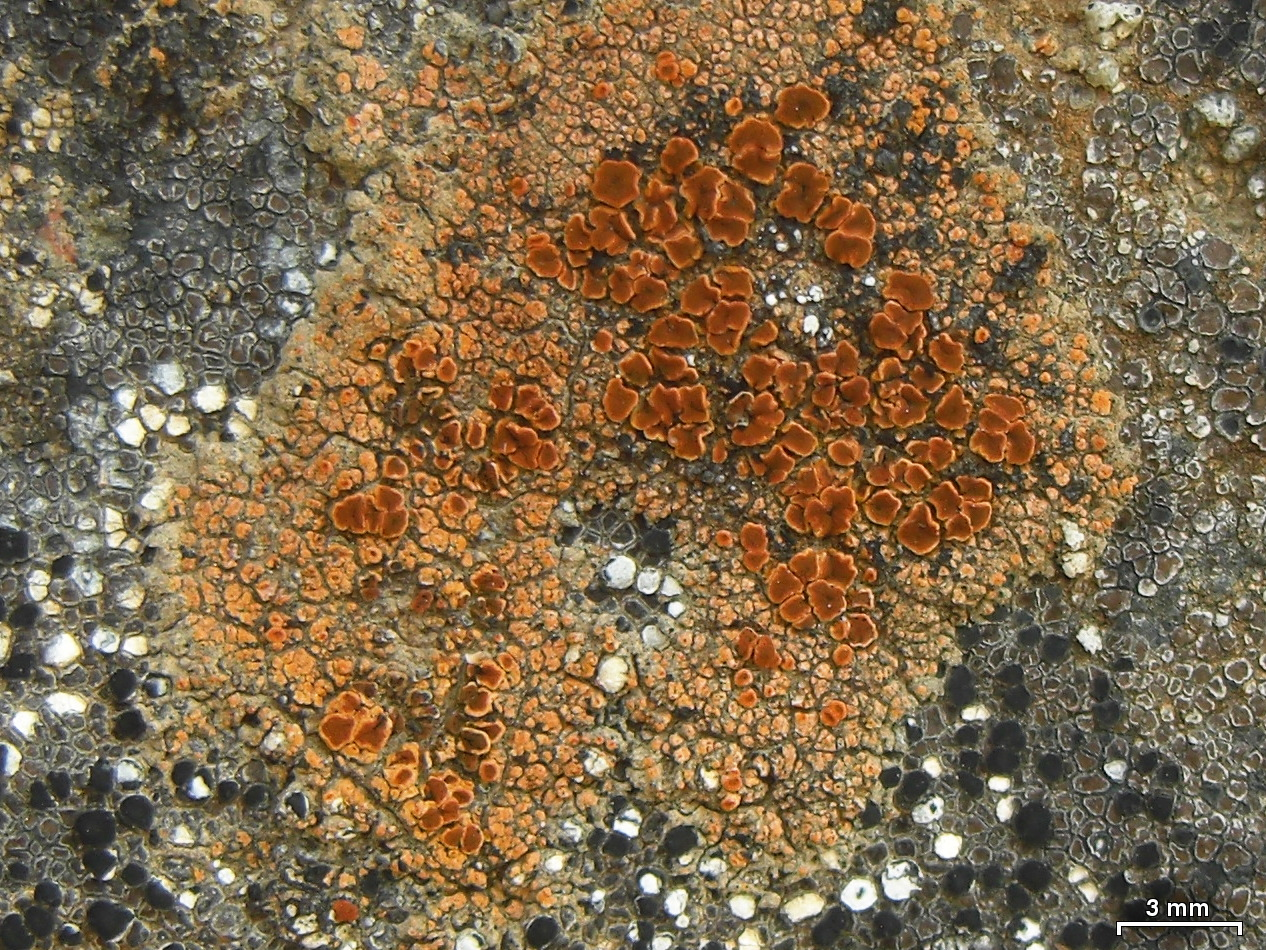

Scientific classification
- Kingdom: Fungi
- Division: Ascomycota
- Class: Lecanoromycetes
- Order: Teloschistales
- Family: Teloschistaceae
- Genus: Caloplaca
- Species: C. adnexa

Binomial name
- Caloplaca adnexa Vězda (1977)

= Caloplaca adnexa =

Species of lichen

Caloplaca adnexa is a species of saxicolous (rock-dwelling), crustose lichen in the family Teloschistaceae. It was formally described as a new species in 1977 by Czech lichenologist Antonín Vězda. The type specimen was collected from the mountain Popova Šapka in the former Yugoslavia (now North Macedonia), at an altitude of 2,000 m (6,600 ft). In addition to Europe, it is also found in North America.

== See also ==
- List of Caloplaca species
