= Caloplaca filsonii =

Scientific classification
- Domain: Eukaryota
- Kingdom: Fungi
- Division: Ascomycota
- Class: Lecanoromycetes
- Order: Teloschistales
- Family: Teloschistaceae
- Genus: Caloplaca
- Species: C. filsonii

Binomial name
- Caloplaca filsonii Hafellner, S.Y.Kondr. & Kärnefelt (2007)

Species of lichen

Caloplaca filsonii is a species of corticolous (bark-dwelling), crustose lichen in the family Teloschistaceae. It has a crust-like thallus that is uneven and warty around the edges and more distinctly wart-like in the centre, coloured in shades of grey and brownish-grey near its reproductive structures (apothecia), but lacking a developed prothallus.

== Taxonomy ==
The lichen was first formally described in 2007 by lichenologists Josef Hafellner, Sergey Kondratyuk, and Ingvar Kärnefelt. The type specimen was collected in 1979 by Neville Scarlett from Mud Island (Moreton Bay, Queensland), where it was found growing on Avicennia marina in a mangrove. The species epithet honours Australian lichenologist Rex Bertram Filson, who has contributed significantly to the study of Australian lichens, particularly within the family Teloschistaceae.

== Description ==
Caloplaca filsonii has a crustose thallus. In its peripheral zone, the thallus is uneven to somewhat verrucose, wrinkled, and warty, transitioning to a more strictly verrucose appearance in the central area. The verrucae are single, measuring 0.1–0.3 mm in diameter or width, and are coloured grey, whitish-grey, or brownish-grey near the apothecia. The prothallus is not developed in this species.

The apothecia of Caloplaca filsonii are 0.3–1 mm in diameter, abundant, and typically rounded. Initially, they are lecanorine in form but become distinctly zeorine as they mature. The thalline margin is whitish, measuring about 50–150 μm thick. The true exciple is hyaline-greyish, ranging from 50 to 75 μm in width, with the disc appearing brownish, brownish-grey, or dark grey without pruina. The hymenium is 90–100 μm high and hyaline, with a straw-yellowish epihymenium and a 50–70 μm-thick, brownish subhymenium underlined by an algal layer 60–90 μm thick. Ascospores are long and narrow, measuring 11–16 by 3–5.5 μm, with a septum of 1–2 (up to 5) μm.

The species contains caloploicin as a major secondary metabolite, vicanicin and atranorin as minor metabolites, and several unknown anthraquinones. Chemical spot tests of the thallus and apothecia yield K+ (red), C−, and I− reactions.

== Similar species ==
Caloplaca filsonii is characterized by its verrucose whitish-grey thallus, lecanorine then zeorine apothecia with a hyaline-greyish true exciple and brownish-grey disc. It is distinguished from similar species like the New Zealand Caloplaca homologa by having much smaller, polarilocular ascospores. Compared to the European boreal lichen C. suspiciosa, C. filsonii has a well-developed whitish thallus, larger apothecia, thicker thalline margin and true exciple, a higher hymenium, paraphyses not widened at the tips, and longer, narrower ascospores with a much narrower septum.

The eastern Asian species Fauriea yonaguniensis is similar to Caloplaca filsonii but has several key differences. It has exclusively lecanorine apothecia, compared to those of C. filsonii, which transition from lecanorine to zeorine. It has slightly wider ascospores (11–14 by 4–6 μm versus 11–16 by 3–5.5 μm) with a wider ascospore septum (2–4 μm thick versus 1–2 μm wide), has a different chemical spot test reaction (K− versus K+), and contains different secondary metabolites.

== Habitat and distribution ==
Caloplaca filsonii is only known to grow on the bark of Avicennia marina, a mangrove species. Its distribution is limited to several localities in Queensland, Australia.

== See also ==
- List of Caloplaca species
