= Caloplaca murrayi =

Scientific classification
- Domain: Eukaryota
- Kingdom: Fungi
- Division: Ascomycota
- Class: Lecanoromycetes
- Order: Teloschistales
- Family: Teloschistaceae
- Genus: Caloplaca
- Species: C. murrayi

Binomial name
- Caloplaca murrayi D.J.Galloway (2004)

Species of lichen

Caloplaca murrayi is a species of crustose lichen in the family Teloschistaceae. It is endemic to Aotearoa New Zealand. Its ochre-to-rusty thalli and crowded, rust-brown fruiting bodies make it conspicuous on sun-washed greywacke, schist and other hard rocks from Wellington southwards.

== Taxonomy ==
David J. Galloway described the lichen as a species new to science in 2004, based on material collected from a schist outcrop near Roxburgh, Otago. Caloplaca murrayi belongs to the large orange-lichen genus Caloplaca, which is most diverse in maritime and montane habitats. The holotype (CHR 534104) was collected in 2002 on the Roxburgh golf-course escarpment, but an earlier, unrecognised gathering had been made by James Murray; Galloway chose the epithet murrayi to commemorate that pioneering Dunedin lichenologist.

Morphologically, the species resembles the austral species Austroplaca cirrochrooides yet differs in lacking soredia, having consistently larger, rust-toned discs and broader, more robust ascospores. These distinctions, together with its New Zealand distribution and DNA evidence from allied taxa, support its recognition as a separate endemic lineage.

== Description ==
The thallus forms irregular, closely attached patches 1–5 cm across. At the margins the cortex fissures into tiny blocks (areoles) or minute flaps (squamules) that sometimes lift free of the rock surface. When dry the upper cortex is tawny-brown to cream-fawn; when moist it deepens to reddish-orange and shows scattered, whitish breathing pores (pseudocyphellae). No powdery soredia are produced.

Apothecia (fruiting bodies) erupt through the cortex, up to eight per areole, soon becoming plate-like cups 0.1–1.0 mm wide. Their discs start concave but usually flatten, turning rusty orange-brown to chestnut. A thin collar of thallus tissue (the thalline margin) often remains as a pale rim beneath the darker proper margin. Microscopy shows colourless, oil-free hymenia 55–75 μm tall, eight-spored asci, and oblong ascospores measuring 13–18.5 × 6.5–10 μm with a sturdy internal wall (septum) a quarter to a third of the spore length.

== Habitat and distribution ==
Caloplaca murrayi is strictly saxicolous, favouring hard, sun-exposed faces of schist, greywacke and coastal grey sandstone. It occurs from sea level supralittoral benches to inland valley cliffs, tolerating periodic salt spray as well as drier continental climates. Recorded sites extend from Makara on Cook Strait southwards through Otago localities such as Taieri Mouth and Roxburgh, indicating a principally south-eastern range within Te Waipounamu (the South Island).

Field observations note its frequent association with other orange Caloplaca species and black Verrucaria crusts, forming colour mosaics on lightly weathered rock. Despite this visibility, collections remain scattered, suggesting either a genuinely patchy distribution or under-recording across suitable New Zealand coastal and montane habitats.

== See also ==
- List of Caloplaca species
