= Caloplaca begaensis =

Scientific classification
- Kingdom: Fungi
- Division: Ascomycota
- Class: Lecanoromycetes
- Order: Teloschistales
- Family: Teloschistaceae
- Genus: Caloplaca
- Species: C. begaensis

Binomial name
- Caloplaca begaensis S.Y.Kondr. & Kärnefelt (2009)

Species of lichen

Caloplaca begaensis is a species of terricolous (ground-dwelling), crustose lichen in the family Teloschistaceae. Found in New South Wales, Australia, it was formally described as a new species in 2009 by lichenologists Sergey Kondratyuk and Ingvar Kärnefelt. The type specimen was collected by the first author from the Bega Valley Shire, at Beares Beach, where it was found growing on soil near sandstone outcrops. The species epithet refers to the type locality, the only place the lichen has been documented.

Although similar to Gyalolechia flavovirescens in appearance, Caloplaca begaensis has grayish-green areolae, broadly oil-containing cells positioned in the centre of paraphyses, smaller and narrower ascospores, narrower septa in the ascospores, and its subhymenium and basal hymenium lack oil droplets.

== See also ==
- List of Caloplaca species
