= Caloplaca filsoniorum =

Scientific classification
- Domain: Eukaryota
- Kingdom: Fungi
- Division: Ascomycota
- Class: Lecanoromycetes
- Order: Teloschistales
- Family: Teloschistaceae
- Genus: Caloplaca
- Species: C. filsoniorum

Binomial name
- Caloplaca filsoniorum S.Y.Kondr., Kärnefelt & Elix (2009)

Species of lichen

Caloplaca filsoniorum is a species of corticolous (bark-dwelling), crustose lichen in the family Teloschistaceae. Found in Australia, it was formally described as a new species in 2009 by lichenologists Sergey Kondratyuk, Ingvar Kärnefelt, and John Elix. The type specimen was collected by the first author from a Eucalyptus forest in Booral township, where it was found growing on the bark of Melaleuca. The species epithet honours Australian lichenologist Rex Filson, on whose farm the type was collected. In addition to the type locality in eastern Australia, the lichen also occurs in scattered localities in New South Wales.

== See also ==
- List of Caloplaca species
