= Caloplaca yammeraensis =

Scientific classification
- Kingdom: Fungi
- Division: Ascomycota
- Class: Lecanoromycetes
- Order: Teloschistales
- Family: Teloschistaceae
- Genus: Caloplaca
- Species: C. yammeraensis

Binomial name
- Caloplaca yammeraensis S.Y.Kondr., Kärnefelt, John Elix (2009)
- Holotype site: Yammera Gap in Napier Range

Species of lichen

Caloplaca yammeraensis is a species of corticolous (bark-dwelling), crustose lichen in the family Teloschistaceae. Found in Australia, it was formally described as a new species in 2009 by lichenologists Sergey Kondratyuk, Ingvar Kärnefelt, and John Alan Elix. The type specimen was collected from the Yammera Gap in Napier Range along the Gibb River Road, where it was found growing on Celtis. The species epithet refers to the type locality, the only location the species has been documented.

== See also ==
- List of Caloplaca species
