= Caloplaca megalariicola =

Scientific classification
- Kingdom: Fungi
- Division: Ascomycota
- Class: Lecanoromycetes
- Order: Teloschistales
- Family: Teloschistaceae
- Genus: Caloplaca
- Species: C. megalariicola

Binomial name
- Caloplaca megalariicola Fryday (2012)

Species of lichen-dwelling lichen

Caloplaca megalariicola is a species of lichenicolous (lichen-dwelling) lichen in the family Teloschistaceae. Found on the Falkland Islands, it was described as a new species in 2012 by Alan Fryday. It grows on the lichen Megalaria grossa.

== See also ==
- List of Caloplaca species
