= Caloplaca feuereri =

Scientific classification
- Kingdom: Fungi
- Division: Ascomycota
- Class: Lecanoromycetes
- Order: Teloschistales
- Family: Teloschistaceae
- Genus: Caloplaca
- Species: C. feuereri

Binomial name
- Caloplaca feuereri S.Y.Kondr., Kärnefelt & A.Thell (2009)
- Holotype site: Flinders Island, Bass Strait

Species of lichen

Caloplaca feuereri is a species of saxicolous (rock-dwelling), crustose lichen in the family Teloschistaceae. Found in Australia, it was formally described as a new species in 2009 by lichenologists Sergey Kondratyuk, Ingvar Kärnefelt, and Arne Thell. The type specimen was collected from Flinders Island, the largest island in the Furneaux Group in the Bass Strait, northeast of Tasmania. Caloplaca feuereri is known to occur only in a few localities in the Bass Strait Islands and in Tasmania, where it grows on coastal siliceous rocks, including granite and dolomite. The species epithet honours German lichenologist Tassilo Feuerer.

== See also ==
- List of Caloplaca species
