= Caloplaca obscurella =

Scientific classification
- Domain: Eukaryota
- Kingdom: Fungi
- Division: Ascomycota
- Class: Lecanoromycetes
- Order: Teloschistales
- Family: Teloschistaceae
- Genus: Caloplaca
- Species: C. obscurella

Binomial name
- Caloplaca obscurella (J.Lahm ex Körb.) Th.Fr. (1871)

Synonyms
- List: Blastenia obscurella J.Lahm ex Körb. (1860); Placodium obscurellum (J.Lahm ex Körb.) Hepp (1867); Lecanora obscurella (J.Lahm ex Körb.) Nyl. (1880); Callopisma obscurellum (J.Lahm ex Körb.) J.Lahm (1883); Blastenia diphyes var. obscurella (J.Lahm ex Körb.) Boistel (1903); Lecidea obscurella (J.Lahm ex Körb.) Hue (1913); Pyrenodesmia obscurella (J.Lahm ex Körb.) M.Choisy (1951); Lecanora refellens Nyl. (1877); Caloplaca refellens (Nyl.) H.Olivier (1909); Placodium refellens (Nyl.) A.L.Sm. (1918)

Species of lichen

Caloplaca obscurella is a species of crustose lichen in the family Teloschistaceae. Found in Europe, the lichen was first described as a new species of Blastenia by Johann Gottlieb Franz-Xaver Lahm in Gustav Wilhelm Körber's 1860 work Parerga lichenologica. It has been transferred to several genera in its taxonomic history, but was transferred to genus Caloplaca and given the binomial name it is now known as by Theodor Magnus Fries in 1871.

== See also ==
- List of Caloplaca species
