= Caloplaca wallabyensis =

Scientific classification
- Domain: Eukaryota
- Kingdom: Fungi
- Division: Ascomycota
- Class: Lecanoromycetes
- Order: Teloschistales
- Family: Teloschistaceae
- Genus: Caloplaca
- Species: C. wallabyensis

Binomial name
- Caloplaca wallabyensis Elix, S.Y.Kondr. & Kärnefelt (2010)

Species of lichen

Caloplaca wallabyensis is a species of crustose lichen in the family Teloschistaceae. Found in Australia, it was formally described as a new species in 2010 by lichenologists John Alan Elix, Sergey Kondratyuk, and Ingvar Kärnefelt. The type specimen was collected by Elix in Western Australia's Wallaby Hills Nature Reserve, for which the species is named. Here it was found growing on an old termite mound in Eucalyptus salmonophloia woodland with Xanthorrhoea shrubs and laterite rocks. It is known only from the type locality, where it is common.

The lichen has a thallus that is 1–2 cm (0.4–0.8 in) wide, which sometimes aggregates with nearby thalli to form larger colonies. The thallus is rather indistinct, only rarely forming a thin membrane, and the lichen is noticeable more by the dark brownish-orange apothecia, which are 0.3–1 mm in diameter. Secondary chemicals present in Caloplaca wallabyensis include parietin (major), as well as minor amounts of brialmontin 1, parietinic acid, and teloschistin.

== See also ==
- List of Caloplaca species
