= Caloplaca sterilis =

Scientific classification
- Kingdom: Fungi
- Division: Ascomycota
- Class: Lecanoromycetes
- Order: Teloschistales
- Family: Teloschistaceae
- Genus: Caloplaca
- Species: C. sterilis

Binomial name
- Caloplaca sterilis Šoun, Khodosovtsev, Vondrák (2011)
- Holotype site: Cape Tarchankut, Ukraine

Species of lichen

Caloplaca sterilis is a corticolous (bark-dwelling), crustose lichen belonging to the family Teloschistaceae, described in 2011. It is primarily found in steppe and sand dune habitats in the Black Sea region, and has been recorded from Bulgaria, Romania, southwest Russia, and Ukraine. Caloplaca sterilis is characterised by tiny squamules/areoles with contrasting pale greyish-green to greenish soredia. It is easily overlooked and challenging to identify when completely sorediate and sterile (i.e., without any apothecia), especially as its soredia do not contain the typical Sedifolia-grey pigment.

== Taxonomy ==
The lichen was formally described in 2011 by the lichenologists Jaroslav Šoun, Oleksandr Khodosovtsev, and Jan Vondrák. The species name sterilis reflects the often sterile state of this species. The type specimen was collected by the second author from cape Tarchankut on the coast of the Tarkhankut Peninsula, in the Chernomorsky District of Ukraine.

== Description ==
The thallus of Caloplaca sterilis is scattered, forming areoles or squamules that can be up to 2–3 cm wide. It is generally thin, grey-green, and often white with pruina. The areoles or squamules are slightly convex, measuring 50–300 μm in width and 50–130 μm in thickness. The cortical layer is alveolate (honeycombed), 8–12 μm thick, and the algal layer is thick, extending to the lower thallus surface.

Soralia develop on the margins of areoles or occasionally on the thallus surface, and are greenish or greenish-grey, measuring 80–250 μm. Soredia are 15–35 μm in diameter and may form consoredia. The thalli sometimes form continuous greenish sorediate crusts. Apothecia are very rare, lecanorine, measuring 0.2–0.6 mm in diameter, with a yellow-orange to orange disc. Pycnidia are immersed and inconspicuous, with bacilliform conidia measuring approximately 3 by 1 μm.

Caloplaca sterilis does not contain anthraquinone pigments or Sedifolia-grey in the thallus and soralia. The soredia's unique colour within the Caloplaca cerina species complex is noted for its lack of Sedifolia-grey.

== Habitat and distribution ==
This species grows on the basal parts of woody plant stems such as Artemisia, Halocnemum, and Thymus, as well as on plant debris and dead wood in steppe and sand dune habitats. It is a common species in steppe landscapes and coastal habitats on sand dunes in Southeast Europe. Associated lichen species include Caloplaca raesaenenii, C. phlogina, Lecania cyrtella, and Xanthoria parietina.

Old specimens from Cherry Hinton near Cambridge (UK) seem to be identical to this species, but molecular data is needed to confirm their identity.

== See also ==
- List of Caloplaca species
