= Caloplaca hafellneri =

Scientific classification
- Domain: Eukaryota
- Kingdom: Fungi
- Division: Ascomycota
- Class: Lecanoromycetes
- Order: Teloschistales
- Family: Teloschistaceae
- Genus: Caloplaca
- Species: C. hafellneri

Binomial name
- Caloplaca hafellneri S.Y.Kondr. & Kärnefelt (2009)

Species of lichen

Caloplaca hafellneri is a rare species of lignicolous (bark-dwelling), crustose lichen in the family Teloschistaceae. Found in South Australia, it was formally described as a new species in 2009 by lichenologists Sergey Kondratyuk and Ingvar Kärnefelt. The type specimen was collected from north of Kingoonya, where it was found growing on wood. The species epithet honours Austrian lichenologist Josef Hafellner, "in recognition to the knowledge of the plurilocular representatives of the genus Caloplaca in Australia, as well as his contributions to lichenology in general". The species is only known from the type collection.

== See also ==
- List of Caloplaca species
