= Caloplaca tephromelae =

Scientific classification
- Kingdom: Fungi
- Division: Ascomycota
- Class: Lecanoromycetes
- Order: Teloschistales
- Family: Teloschistaceae
- Genus: Caloplaca
- Species: C. tephromelae

Binomial name
- Caloplaca tephromelae Kantvilas, Suija & Motiej. (2021)
- Holotype site: Callitris Gully, Tasmania

Species of lichen

Caloplaca tephromelae is a species of lichenicolous (lichen-dwelling) lichen in the family Teloschistaceae. Found in Australia, it was formally described as a new species in 2021 by Gintaras Kantvilas, Ave Suija, and Jurga Motiejūnaitė. The type specimen was collected from the northern rim of Callitris Gully (Wind Song Property, Tasmania); here it was found growing on the thallus of the lichen Tephromela atra, which itself was growing on dolerite outcrops. Caloplaca tephromelae is only known to occur at the type locality. It appears as whitish areolate sections, outlined by a dark band of prothallus, growing within the thallus of its host lichen. Another recorded host is Tephromela granularis. The specific epithet tephromelae refers to the genus of the host.

== See also ==
- List of Caloplaca species
