= Caloplaca fraserensis =

Scientific classification
- Kingdom: Fungi
- Division: Ascomycota
- Class: Lecanoromycetes
- Order: Teloschistales
- Family: Teloschistaceae
- Genus: Caloplaca
- Species: C. fraserensis

Binomial name
- Caloplaca fraserensis S.Y.Kondr. & Kärnefelt (2009)
- Holotype site: Fraser Island

Species of lichen

Caloplaca fraserensis is a species of corticolous (bark-dwelling), crustose lichen in the family Teloschistaceae. Found in Australia, it was formally described as a new species in 2009 by lichenologists Sergey Kondratyuk and Ingvar Kärnefelt. The type specimen was collected by John Elix from Fraser Island, where it was growing on Casuarina. The species epithet combines the name of the type locality with the Latin suffix -ensis, indicating place of origin. The lichen is known to occur in several localities in Queensland and in Victoria.

== See also ==
- List of Caloplaca species
