= Caloplaca marchantiorum =

Scientific classification
- Domain: Eukaryota
- Kingdom: Fungi
- Division: Ascomycota
- Class: Lecanoromycetes
- Order: Teloschistales
- Family: Teloschistaceae
- Genus: Caloplaca
- Species: C. marchantiorum

Binomial name
- Caloplaca marchantiorum S.Y.Kondr. & Kärnefelt (2009)

Species of lichen

Caloplaca marchantiorum is a species of corticolous (bark-dwelling), crustose lichen in the family Teloschistaceae. Found in Australia, it was formally described as a new species in 2009 by lichenologists Sergey Kondratyuk and Ingvar Kärnefelt. The type specimen was collected by the authors along the Gwydir Highway, between Delungra and Warialda, where it was found in Eucalyptus woodland growing on bark. The species epithet honours Neville Marchant and his wife, who assisted the authors with their fieldwork. In addition to New South Wales, the lichen is known to occur in Western Australia, Victoria, and Tasmania.

== See also ==
- List of Caloplaca species
