= Caloplaca aseptatospora =

Scientific classification
- Domain: Eukaryota
- Kingdom: Fungi
- Division: Ascomycota
- Class: Lecanoromycetes
- Order: Teloschistales
- Family: Teloschistaceae
- Genus: Caloplaca
- Species: C. aseptatospora

Binomial name
- Caloplaca aseptatospora S.Y.Kondr. & Kärnefelt (2009)

Species of lichen

Caloplaca aseptatospora is a species of corticolous (bark-dwelling), crustose lichen in the family Teloschistaceae. Found in Australia, it was formally described as a new species in 2009 by lichenologists Sergey Kondratyuk and Ingvar Kärnefelt. The type specimen, collected from Coochiemudlo Island (Moreton Bay) in 1982 by Rex Filson, was found growing on the base of a sheltered tree trunk. The species epithet alludes to its main diagnostic character–largely immature, non-septate spores. Caloplaca aseptatospora is only known to occur in a few localities in Queensland.

== Description ==
The crustose thallus of Caloplaca aseptatospora forms patches up to 3–5 cm (1.2–2.0 in) across, whitish-grey to dark grey in colour. The surface has numerous granular isidia and many zeorine or lecanorine apothecia, with yellowish discs. The apothecia measure 0.4–0.9 mm in diameter and are about 0.2 mm thick. The ascospores are usually immature and lacking septa; mature spores with a septum are rare.

Lichen products that occur in the species include fragilin as a major substance, atranorin, 7-chloroparietinic acid, 7-chloroemodin as minor substance, and trace amounts of parietin.

== See also ==
- List of Caloplaca species
