= Caloplaca alstrupii =

Scientific classification
- Domain: Eukaryota
- Kingdom: Fungi
- Division: Ascomycota
- Class: Lecanoromycetes
- Order: Teloschistales
- Family: Teloschistaceae
- Genus: Caloplaca
- Species: C. alstrupii

Binomial name
- Caloplaca alstrupii Søchting (1999)

Species of lichen

Caloplaca alstrupii is a species of corticolous (bark-dwelling) crustose lichen in the family Teloschistaceae. Found in Denmark, it was described as a new species in 1999 by the lichenologist Ulrik Søchting. It is a member of a group of soredia-producing Caloplaca species that do not produce anthraquinone pigments; lacking these typically colourful pigments, the thallus of lichens in this group is often inconspicuous.

== See also ==
- List of Caloplaca species
