= Caloplaca rinodinae-albae =

Conservation status
- Vulnerable (IUCN 3.1)

Scientific classification
- Kingdom: Fungi
- Division: Ascomycota
- Class: Lecanoromycetes
- Order: Teloschistales
- Family: Teloschistaceae
- Genus: Caloplaca
- Species: C. rinodinae-albae

Binomial name
- Caloplaca rinodinae-albae Poelt & Nimis (1987)

Species of lichen

Caloplaca rinodinae-albae is a lichenicolous (lichen-dwelling) species of crustose lichen in the family Teloschistaceae, first described in 1987. This species is unique for its parasitic growth on the lichen Helmutiopsis alba. Characteristics of the lichen include its small, rounded, pale orange thalli and its ability to form larger patches through the confluence of individual thalli.

== Taxonomy ==
The species was first formally described in 1987 by the lichenologists Josef Poelt and Pier Luigi Nimis, based on specimens collected in Sardinia. The type specimen was found at Isola dei Cavoli, near the southern part of Cape Carbonara, within the Province of Cagliari. The collection was made by the authors in July 1985, on north-facing cliffs of the area. It is distinguished from similar species by its small size, parasitic growth on Helmutiopsis alba (formerly in genus Rinodina), the thick swollen cells in the paraphyses, and its broadly elliptical to spherical spores.

== Description ==
The thallus of Caloplaca rinodinae-albae is small and rounded, measuring 5–8 mm in diameter. It is crustose, ranging from continuous to squamulose-areolate in texture, with some areolae slightly lobulate and measuring 0.2–0.5 mm in diameter. The apothecia (fruiting bodies) are sparsely distributed or clustered, typically up to 1 mm in diameter but can be smaller. They feature a thick and initially prominent margin with a plane, red-orange disc. The apothecia are lecanorine in form, meaning they have a thalline margin, and their medulla is mostly filled with photobiont cells. The cortex of the apothecia is thin and paraplectenchymatous, with cells up to 5 μm thick. The hymenium is about 70 μm high. The paraphyses are 1.5–2 μm thick at the base, with the last 2–3 terminal cells swelling to up to 7 μm. Each ascus contains eight broadly ellipsoid to spherical spores, measuring 9–15.5 by 7.5–9 μm, with the spherical spores being 7–8 μm.

== Habitat and distribution ==
Caloplaca rinodinae-albae was first identified in Sardinia, Italy, specifically on the Isola dei Cavoli, near Capo Carbonara. It grows parasitically on Helmutiopsis alba, a host lichen, often in isolated patches suggesting obligate parasitism. This species coexists with other lichens such as Sanguineodiscus aractinus, Polyozosia salina, Tephromela atra, and Xanthoparmelia pulla. It has also been recorded from a coastal station near Santa Teresa Gallura in northern Sardinia. The area of occurrence of C. rinodinae-albae is estimated to be 0.432 km^{2} (0.167 sq mi).

== Conservation ==
In 2017, the conservation status of Caloplaca rinodinae-albae was assessed for the global IUCN Red List. It is considered a vulnerable species because it is at risk from accidental fire (owing to its small area of occurrence), tourism development, and increased erosion on Sardinia's coasts.

== See also ==
- List of Caloplaca species
