= Caloplaca dorrigoensis =

Scientific classification
- Kingdom: Fungi
- Division: Ascomycota
- Class: Lecanoromycetes
- Order: Teloschistales
- Family: Teloschistaceae
- Genus: Caloplaca
- Species: C. dorrigoensis

Binomial name
- Caloplaca dorrigoensis S.Y.Kondr. & Kärnefelt (2009)

Species of lichen

Caloplaca dorrigoensis is a rare species of corticolous (bark-dwelling), crustose lichen in the family Teloschistaceae. Found in Australia, it was formally described as a new species in 2009 by lichenologists Sergey Kondratyuk and Ingvar Kärnefelt. The type specimen was collected by Rex Filson from Dorrigo National Park on the east side of Dorrigo Mountain, where it was found growing on the bark of a tree. The species epithet refers to the type locality, which is the only location the species is known to occur.

== See also ==
- List of Caloplaca species
