= Caloplaca concilians =

Scientific classification
- Domain: Eukaryota
- Kingdom: Fungi
- Division: Ascomycota
- Class: Lecanoromycetes
- Order: Teloschistales
- Family: Teloschistaceae
- Genus: Caloplaca
- Species: C. concilians

Binomial name
- Caloplaca concilians (Nyl.) H.Olivier (1909)

Synonyms
- List: Lecanora ferruginea f. concilians Nyl. (1861); Caloplaca ferruginea var. concilians (Nyl.) H.Olivier (1884); Lecanora concilians (Nyl.) Cromb. (1894); Lecidea concilians (Nyl.) Hue (1914); Placodium concilians (Nyl.) A.L.Sm. (1918); Caloplaca ferruginea f. concilians Nyl. (1861); Lecanora ferruginea var. concilians (Nyl.) Nyl. (1880)

Species of lichen

Caloplaca concilians is a species of corticolous (bark-dwelling) crustose lichen in the family Teloschistaceae. It was described as a new species in 1862 by the Finnish lichenologist William Nylander, who classified as a form of the species Lecanora ferruginea (now Blastenia ferruginea). Henri Jacques François Olivier promoted it to full species status in the genus Caloplaca in 1909.

== See also ==
- List of Caloplaca species
