= Caloplaca clavatoisidiata =

Scientific classification
- Kingdom: Fungi
- Division: Ascomycota
- Class: Lecanoromycetes
- Order: Teloschistales
- Family: Teloschistaceae
- Genus: Caloplaca
- Species: C. clavatoisidiata

Binomial name
- Caloplaca clavatoisidiata S.Y.Kondr., Kärnefelt & Vondrák (2009)
- Holotype site: Porcupine Gorge National Park, Queensland

Species of lichen

Caloplaca clavatoisidiata is a species of saxicolous (rock-dwelling), crustose lichen in the family Teloschistaceae. Found in Australia, it was formally described as a new species in 2009 by the lichenologists Sergey Kondratyuk, Ingvar Kärnefelt, and Jan Vondrák. The type specimen was collected by the third author from Porcupine Gorge National Park (Hughenden, Queensland) at an altitude between 550 and 600 m (1,800 and 1,970 ft); there, it was found growing on sandstone. It is only known to occur at the type locality. The species epithet refers to the clavate (club-shaped) isidia.

== See also ==
- List of Caloplaca species
