= Caloplaca haematommona =

Scientific classification
- Kingdom: Fungi
- Division: Ascomycota
- Class: Lecanoromycetes
- Order: Teloschistales
- Family: Teloschistaceae
- Genus: Caloplaca
- Species: C. haematommona

Binomial name
- Caloplaca haematommona Elix & S.Y.Kondr. (2007)
- Holotype site: Yilliminning Rock, Western Australia

Species of lichen

Caloplaca haematommona is a little-known species of corticolous (bark-dwelling), lichen in the family Teloschistaceae. It has a very thin, whitish, crust-like thallus dotted with black, spanning about 10–18 mm in width, and apothecia (fruiting bodies) ranging from 0.2 to 0.8 mm in diameter, and becoming yellow-orange to brownish-orange as they mature. The lichen is known only from its type locality in Western Australia.

== Taxonomy ==
The lichen was first formally described in 2007 by the lichenologists John Alan Elix and Sergey Kondratyuk. The type specimen was collected by the first author from Yilliminning Rock in Western Australia, which is situated 17 km (11 mi) to the east of Narrogin. Discovered on a dead shrub in a crevice of a rock and coexisting with an unclassified Caloplaca species, the specimen was located in a vast, open granite outcrop encircled by arid Eucalyptus forests, at an elevation of 330 m (1,080 ft). The species name refers to the presence of haematommone, a rare metabolite in the genus Caloplaca.

== Description ==
Caloplaca haematommona has a crustose thallus that is very thin or almost absent, measuring approximately 10–18 mm in width. It is somewhat uneven and continuous, with a whitish appearance dotted with black, and is about 15 μm thick.

The species features apothecia that range from 0.2 to 0.8 mm in diameter. Initially, these are biatorine or rarely zeorine, with a very thin or absent thalline margin. They become distinctly sessile as they mature, featuring a well-developed proper margin approximately 50–75 μm thick, usually coloured yellow-orange to dull, brownish-orange. The disc ranges from brownish-orange to orange-red. The hymenium is about 60–70 μm high, underlain by a hyaline (translucent) subhymenium. Paraphyses (filament-like support structures in the hymenium) in Caloplaca haematommona are distinctively septate, slightly wider towards the tips, and richly branched. Ascospores have a thick cell wall at the poles, measuring 9–14 by 5–7 μm, with a septum 4–6 μm thick.

Chemical analysis using standard spot tests reveals that the true exciple and epithecium react K+ (reddish violet, turning bluish violet), with the contents of the ascus becoming purplish. Major chemicals constituents include atranorin and haematommone.

== Similar species ==
Caloplaca haematommona is characterised by its very thin or absent whitish thallus, biatorine apothecia with yellow-orange proper margins, and brownish orange-red discs. It features highly branched paraphyses, particularly towards the tips, and ascospores with thick cell walls at the poles. While it bears resemblance to C. holocarpa and C. luteoalba, it is distinguished by its brighter apothecia and chemical composition. The presence of haematommone and atranorin sets it apart from other epiphytic species in its group. The Mediterranean species C. aegatica differs in several aspects, including the presence of a well-developed greyish thallus, oil droplets in the paraphyses, and blackish pycnidia. Caloplaca haematommona also differs from Athallia cerinelloides in the colour of its apothecia and from Lendemeriella borealis in the pigment in its apothecial margin.

== Habitat and distribution ==
This lichen is found on dead twigs of shrubs and is associated with several other lichen species. At the time of its original publication, Caloplaca haematommona was known to occur only at its type locality in Western Australia.

== See also ==
- List of Caloplaca species
