= Caloplaca nigra =

Scientific classification
- Kingdom: Fungi
- Division: Ascomycota
- Class: Lecanoromycetes
- Order: Teloschistales
- Family: Teloschistaceae
- Genus: Caloplaca
- Species: C. nigra

Binomial name
- Caloplaca nigra Bungartz & Søchting (2020)

Species of lichen

Caloplaca nigra is a species of saxicolous (rock-dwelling), crustose lichen in the family Teloschistaceae. Found on rocks predominantly in the Galápagos Islands, it is characterised by its dark reproductive structures (apothecia).

== Taxonomy ==
The species Caloplaca nigra was formally described and catalogued by lichenologists Frank Bungartz and Ulrik Søchting. The species epithet nigra derives from the Latin for "black", alluding to the colour of its apothecial discs. The type specimen is from the Galápagos Islands, specifically from San Cristóbal Island's hills south of Punta Pit at the island's northeast coast.

== Description ==
The lichen has a brownish-olive, distinctly areolate thallus. These areoles, in some instances, appear as though outlined by a whitish border, especially around their periphery. The apothecia, ranging from sparse to abundant, are more or less aspicilioid (more or less immersed in the thallus) at the onset. Their margins are hard to distinguish from the thallus, later becoming more adnate and lecanorine. Apothecial discs are flat to slightly convex and black. Microscopic examinations of Caloplaca nigra reveal a brownish-olive epihymenium and a hymenium that is clear and free from any dispersion. Asci are broadly clavate and resemble the Teloschistes-type. The ascospores, numbering eight per ascus, are polaribilocular and range from ellipsoid to broadly ellipsoid, measuring approximately 10.0–11.3 by 5.8–7.8 μm.

Chemical spot tests conducted on the thallus and apothecia have shown consistent non-reactivity. Secondary metabolites have not been identified in the species.

The Galápagos also has another species, C. floridana, which shares the trait of black apothecia with Caloplaca nigra. However, C. floridana is corticolous, growing on tree bark, and displays distinct thallus characteristics and chemical reactions that differentiate it from Caloplaca nigra. Although DNA extraction for Caloplaca nigra proved challenging, its unique attributes underscore its classification as a separate species.

== Habitat and distribution ==
Endemic to the Galápagos Islands, Caloplaca nigra has been observed growing on rocks in environments ranging from sun-drenched coastal regions to the lower transition zones. These habitats are typically exposed to significant sunlight, wind, and rainfall.

== See also ==
- List of Caloplaca species
