= Caloplaca stewartensis =

Scientific classification
- Kingdom: Fungi
- Division: Ascomycota
- Class: Lecanoromycetes
- Order: Teloschistales
- Family: Teloschistaceae
- Genus: Caloplaca
- Species: C. stewartensis

Binomial name
- Caloplaca stewartensis S.Y.Kondr. & Kärnefelt (2009)

Species of lichen

Caloplaca stewartensis is a species of lignicolous (wood-dwelling) crustose lichen in the family Teloschistaceae. Found in New Zealand, it was formally described as a new species in 2009 by lichenologists Sergey Kondratyuk and Ingvar Kärnefelt. The type specimen was collected from Whale Point on Stewart Island, where it was found growing on wood and stems of Cytisus scoparius. The species epithet refers to the type locality.

== See also ==
- List of Caloplaca species
