= Caloplaca edwardiana =

Scientific classification
- Domain: Eukaryota
- Kingdom: Fungi
- Division: Ascomycota
- Class: Lecanoromycetes
- Order: Teloschistales
- Family: Teloschistaceae
- Genus: Caloplaca
- Species: C. edwardiana

Binomial name
- Caloplaca edwardiana J.R.Hoffm. & Lendemer (2020)

Species of fungi

Caloplaca edwardiana is a species of lichen-forming fungus in the family Teloschistaceae. It was described as new to science in 2019 by Jordan Hoffman and James Lendemer. It has been found in the southern Appalachian Mountains of eastern North America; more specifically, Alabama, Georgia, and Tennessee.

The thallus, or body, of Caloplaca edwardiana typically has a bright orange to reddish-orange coloration, although slight variations may occur based on environmental conditions. When moist, the thallus appears slightly darker, while in dry conditions, its color becomes more vivid. One feature of Caloplaca edwardiana is its bright orange to reddish-orange color, which sets it apart from other lichen species within its range. Small raised structures known as apothecia (fruiting bodies) dot the surface of the thallus. These apothecia, functioning as the reproductive organs of the lichen, are pale yellow to orange.

This species lives in montane and subalpine environments, particularly on exposed surfaces of rocks and soil in open areas with sufficient sunlight exposure. Caloplaca edwardiana demonstrates a preference for calcareous substrates but may also occur on non-calcareous surfaces under suitable conditions.

== See also ==
- List of Caloplaca species
