= Caloplaca patagoniensis =

Scientific classification
- Kingdom: Fungi
- Division: Ascomycota
- Class: Lecanoromycetes
- Order: Teloschistales
- Family: Teloschistaceae
- Genus: Caloplaca
- Species: C. patagoniensis

Binomial name
- Caloplaca patagoniensis S.Y.Kondr. S.O.Oh & Hur (2020)
- Holotype site: Cordillera Paine, Chile

Species of lichen

Caloplaca patagoniensis is a species of lignicolous (wood-dwelling), crustose lichen in the family Teloschistaceae. It is found in Chile. It forms small thallus patches, with distinctive areoles that change from whitish or greyish-yellow to deep orange or brownish-orange, often covered by a bright orange blastidious mass. Its fruiting bodies (apothecia) are dark reddish-orange and initially immersed in the substrate, while its spores are ellipsoid to elongated, and the species contains parietin, turning purple when exposed to a potassium hydroxide solution.

== Taxonomy ==
The lichen was formally described as a new species in 2020 by the lichenologists Sergey Kondratyuk and Jae-Seoun Hur. The type specimen of Caloplaca patagoniensis was collected from Cordillera Paine in Patagonia, Chile. This specimen, found at an altitude of about 120 m (390 ft), was found growing on a dead tree along with the lichen Massjukiella candelaria.

== Description ==
Caloplaca patagoniensis has a thallus that typically ranges from 2–9 mm across, often forming larger aggregations. This thallus is areolate, with areoles measuring up to 0.6 mm across. Initially, these areoles appear whitish to greyish-yellow, featuring blastidia on a few sides. These blastidia stand out in their deep orange to dark brownish-orange or dull brownish-yellow colour, with a vividly orange blastidious mass. The conidiomata and apothecia of the species are dark, dull reddish-orange.

Areoles in Caloplaca patagoniensis vary in size from 0.2 to 0.8 mm across and 0.1–0.6 mm in height/thickness, especially noticeable in the centre where they are almost entirely covered by blastidious mass. Soredia and blastidia, measuring 20–25 μm in diameter, have a brownish-orange surface. Conblastidia, comprising several blastidia, can reach up to 40–50 μm in diameter.

In cross-section, the thallus reveals a very narrow cortical layer, about 5–7 μm thick, with paraplectenchymatous cells elongated along the areole's surface. An epinecral layer, somewhat greyish, can be up to 10 μm thick.

The apothecia of Caloplaca patagoniensis range from 0.2 to 0.6 mm in diameter and 0.2–0.25 mm thick. Initially, these apothecia are immersed into the substrate, then into the sorediate-blastidiate mass, with a zeorine structure at first. The true exciple is slightly lighter than the disc, which is dark reddish-brownish-orange. The thalline exciple, when present and not dissolved into soredia/blastidia, can be up to 50–70 μm thick. The algal layer often contains oil cells, more apparent in potassium hydroxide (K) solution. The hymenium is 80–100 μm high, with paraphyses distinctly swollen towards the tips, and the subhymenium is up to 30 μm thick. The asci contain 8 spores with a mix of larger and smaller bipolar ascospores. The ascospores are widely ellipsoid to somewhat elongated, measuring 9–16 by 5–9 μm, with the septum ranging from 3–8 μm in width.

Conidiomata are common and numerous, with a dull reddish-orange hue. Conidia are narrowly bacilliform to widely ellipsoid, measuring 2.5–3 by 0.8–1.2 μm.

Chemically, the thallus, apothecia, and conidiomata react to potassium hydroxide (K+) by turning purple; the epihymenium transitions from somewhat blackish-purple to crimson purple. Parietin is present in this species.

== Habitat and distribution ==
Caloplaca patagoniensis has a distribution that, at the time of its original publication, was confined to its type collection in Chile, South America. This lichen species predominantly grows on dead wood. In its natural habitat, Caloplaca patagoniensis is often found in association with other lichen species such as Massjukiella candelaria and various Lecidella species, alongside a range of crustose lichens.

== See also ==
- List of Caloplaca species
