= Caloplaca vainioi =

Scientific classification
- Domain: Eukaryota
- Kingdom: Fungi
- Division: Ascomycota
- Class: Lecanoromycetes
- Order: Teloschistales
- Family: Teloschistaceae
- Genus: Caloplaca
- Species: C. vainioi

Binomial name
- Caloplaca vainioi Hafellner & Poelt (1979)

Species of lichen in the family Teloschistaceae

Caloplaca vainioi is a species of crustose lichen in the family Teloschistaceae. It is based on the name Placodium brebissonii var. microspora, collected by Friedrich Welwitsch in Angola and described by Edvard August Vainio in 1901. In 1979, lichenologists Josef Hafellner and Josef Poelt renamed this taxon to Caloplaca vainioi. Thorsten Lumbsch and colleagues indicated that this species is the same as Caloplaca cateileoides, and proposed placing the two in synonymy. However, Clifford Wetmore questioned the synonymy of these species, noting that their lichen spot tests and hymenium colour were different, and suggested that "further collections and study are necessary".

== See also ==
- List of Caloplaca species
