= Caloplaca akbarica =

Scientific classification
- Kingdom: Fungi
- Division: Ascomycota
- Class: Lecanoromycetes
- Order: Teloschistales
- Family: Teloschistaceae
- Genus: Caloplaca
- Species: C. akbarica

Binomial name
- Caloplaca akbarica Kudratov & Khodosovtsev (2002)

Species of lichen

Caloplaca akbarica, a species of lichen saxicolous (rock-dwelling), crustose lichen described in 2002. Found in Tajikistan, it has a rosette-shaped, lobate thallus, and apothecia that are distinctly pruinose. It was formally described as a new species in 2002 by the lichenologists Imomnazar Kudratov and Oleksandr Khodosovtsev.

== Description ==
Caloplaca akbarica has a rosette-shaped thallus, expanding to 2–3 cm in size. The lobes of this lichen are yellow to orange, flattened, thin, and range in length from 1.5 to 3 mm, with a width of 0.5 to 1.0 mm and a thickness of about 0.2 mm. These lobes widen towards the tips and are closely placed or overlapping without apparent fissures, covered with a yellowish pruina. The central part of the thallus comprises smaller lobes, measuring 0.3–1.0 by 0.2–0.3 mm, which are flat to slightly convex, orange, and may have small fissures or cracks. The cortex consists of several layers of paraplectenchymatous cells.

Apothecia in C. akbarica are zeorine, measuring 0.5–1.0 mm in width, and numerous. They are sessile to constricted at the base and have a thick, bright yellow pruina. Initially, they develop as distinctly pruinose primordia, contrasting with the orange thallus. The disc of the apothecia is concave to plane, covered with thick yellow pruina, and has a slightly crenulate margin. The thalline margin cortex is paraplectenchymatous, measuring 20–25 μm thick. The true exciple is well developed and consists of slightly elongated large cells. The epithecium is yellow, about 7–10 μm high, and the hymenium is hyaline, measuring 70–95 μm in height. The hypothecium is also hyaline, standing 48–60 μm tall. Asci contain eight spores, with ascospores being ellipsoid and measuring 10.7–16.8 by 5.1–9.6 μm, having septa (internal partitions) of 1.4–2.8 μm.

== Similar species ==
Caloplaca akbarica is distinguished from similar species by its flat, yellow-orange lobes with a distinct pruinose coating and the unique structure of its apothecia. It resembles Variospora aurantia in its flattened, pruinose lobes, yet differs in the shape of its ascospores. Compared to Massjukiella impolita, which has a flattened, yellowish pruinose thallus, C. akbarica differs in its narrower ascospores and wider septum. Unlike M. impolita, which tends to be coastal in western North America, C. akbarica is found in central Asia and differs in the more areolated central parts of the thallus.

== Habitat and distribution ==
At the time of its original publication, Caloplaca akbarica was known only from its type locality in southern Tajikistan, specifically from the east slope of the ridge Gozimalik. It grows on exposed limestone at high elevations, around 1,300 m (4,300 ft).

== See also ==
- List of Caloplaca species
