= Caloplaca astonii =

Scientific classification
- Domain: Eukaryota
- Kingdom: Fungi
- Division: Ascomycota
- Class: Lecanoromycetes
- Order: Teloschistales
- Family: Teloschistaceae
- Genus: Caloplaca
- Species: C. astonii

Binomial name
- Caloplaca astonii S.Y.Kondr. & Kärnefelt (2007)

Species of lichen

Caloplaca astonii is a rare species of crustose lichen in the family Teloschistaceae. Described in 2007, is known for its distinct appearance and very limited distribution in Australia. The lichen has a thin thallus measuring 3–8 mm wide, with confluent spots that are thicker and cracked in the centre, showing a dull rose-orange or dull brown-orange colour, and lecanorine apothecia that transition from being immersed in the thallus to raised above it, revealing a bright reddish-brown disc.

== Taxonomy ==
The lichen was first formally described in 2007 by lichenologists Sergey Kondratyuk and Ingvar Kärnefelt. The type material was found in Northwest New South Wales about 8 miles (13 km) south-southwest of Kayrunners and roughly 30 miles (48 km) west of White Cliffs. In this location, a glaring white quartz stone plain, it is common on stones.

This species is akin to Caloplaca montisfracti, but is distinguished by its lecanorine apothecia with a very thin hymenium and small ascospores with attenuated tips. Among Australian Caloplaca species, Caloplaca astonii is unique due to its thin hypothallus, a dull pink thallus, and lecanorine apothecia with a bright red or pink-red disc. It is further characterised by a large thalline margin, a lax palisade paraplectenchymatous cortex, and a loose medulla. The species is named in honour of Helen Aston, who collected the type material in 1966.

== Description ==
Caloplaca astonii features a thallus with a width of 3–8 mm, consisting of confluent spots. It is crustose, very thin, and closely adheres to the substrate, especially at the periphery. The thallus is thicker and cracked in the central part and has a dull rose-orange or dull brown-orange colour. The lecanorine apothecia are initially immersed in the thallus and become raised as they mature, revealing a bright reddish-brown disc.

The hypothallus is extremely thin in the peripheral zone, expanding to 0.5–1.5 mm wide and up to 100 μm thick. The central part of the thallus features areoles measuring 0.6–1.3 mm wide and 0.3–0.4 mm thick, with cracks that are not the naked rock surface, ranging from 25 to 50 (up to 75) μm wide. In section, areoles are 220–350 μm thick, with numerous vertical, lax bundles of hyphae. The cortex is 30–35 μm thick, composed of large, rounded cells, and the algal layer is dispersed and discontinuous. The medulla, consisting of loose short hyphae, reaches a thickness of 70–100 μm.

Apothecia are 0.3–1.0 mm in diameter, initially immersed and then raised as they mature, with a flat, epruinose, and bright reddish-brown disc. Each areole typically contains 1–5 apothecia. The thalline margin is quite thick, and the disc has an uneven surface. The true exciple is 30–35 μm thick, with elongated hyphae. The hymenium is 40–45 μm high, and the subhymenium is 60–100 μm thick. Ascospores are very small, distinctly widened at the septum, and attenuated towards the tips, typically measuring 8–9 by 4.5–6 μm with a septum thickness of 2.5–3 μm.

== Habitat and distribution ==
Caloplaca astonii occurs on quartzite rocks and is considered a very rare inland species. At the time of its original publication, it had only been recorded from the type collection in New South Wales, Australia.

== See also ==
- List of Caloplaca species
