= List of Caloplaca species =

This is a list of species in the lichen genus Caloplaca. Although there were estimated to be more than 500 species in 2008, the family Teloschistaceae has undergone major revisions since then. Several molecular phylogenetic studies have been published that have established a phylogenetic framework to more appropriately classify lichens that were previously grouped in Caloplaca. As of December 2023, Species Fungorum (in the Catalogue of Life) accepts 173 species of Caloplaca.

== A ==
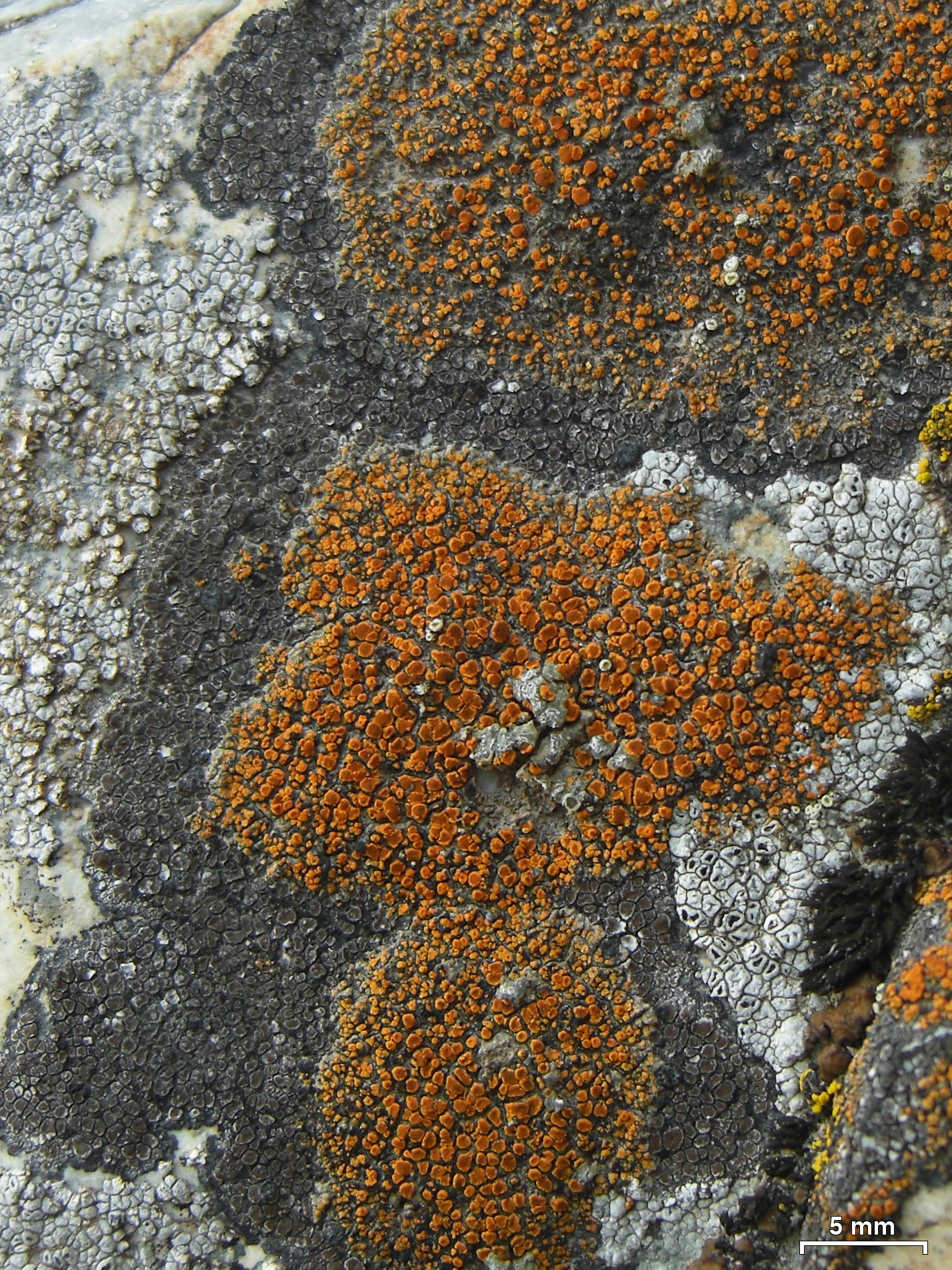
Caloplaca adnexa

- Caloplaca abbreviata Malme (1932)
- Caloplaca abuensis Y.Joshi & Upreti (2008)
- Caloplaca adnexa Vězda (1977) - Europe; North America
- Caloplaca agrata (Vain.) Zahlbr. (1930)
- Caloplaca ahtii Søchting (1994)
- Caloplaca akbarica Kudratov & Khodos. (2002) – Tajikistan
- Caloplaca albopruinosa (Arnold) H.Olivier (1909)
- Caloplaca albovariegata (B.de Lesd.) Wetmore (1995)
- Caloplaca alcarum Poelt (1954)
- Caloplaca aliciae S.Y.Kondr., Kärnefelt & Elix (2007)
- Caloplaca allanii Zahlbr. (1934)
- Caloplaca almbornii Kärnefelt (1987)
- Caloplaca alstrupii Søchting (1999) – Europe
- Caloplaca amsterdamensis Aptroot & Ertz (2011) – Île Amsterdam
- Caloplaca anularis Clauzade & Poelt (1972)
- Caloplaca arandensis Elix, S.Y.Kondr. & Kärnefelt (2010) – Australia
- Caloplaca archeri Kalb, S.Y.Kondr., Elix & Kärnefelt (2010) – Australia
- Caloplaca areolata (Zahlbr.) Clauzade (1963)
- Caloplaca aseptatospora S.Y.Kondr. & Kärnefelt (2009) – Australia
- Caloplaca astonii S.Y.Kondr. & Kärnefelt (2007)
- Caloplaca atroalba (Tuck.) Zahlbr. (1930)
- Caloplaca atrosanguinea (G.Merr.) I.M.Lamb (1954)
- Caloplaca aurea (Schaer.) Zahlbr. (1890)
- Caloplaca austroatlantica Øvstedal (2010)
- Caloplaca austromaritima Aptroot, Gumboski, M.Cáceres & Schumm (2019)

== B ==
- Caloplaca bartlettii S.Y.Kondr. & Kärnefelt (2009) – Tasmania, Australia; New Zealand
- Caloplaca baueri (Müll.Arg.) Zahlbr. (1927)
- Caloplaca beaugleholei S.Y.Kondr. & Kärnefelt (2009) – Australia
- Caloplaca begaensis S.Y.Kondr. & Kärnefelt (2009) – Australia
- Caloplaca bellemerei Hafellner (1983)
- Caloplaca bispora Kalb (2001)
- Caloplaca blastidiomaritima Aptroot, Gumboski, M.Cáceres & Schumm (2019)
- Caloplaca boergesenii (Vain.) Zahlbr. (1930)
- Caloplaca borreri J.R.Laundon (2005)
- Caloplaca brittonii (Zahlbr.) Aptroot (2019)
- Caloplaca brunneola Wetmore (1995)
- Caloplaca bullata (Müll.Arg.) Zahlbr. (1930)
- Caloplaca byrsonimae (Malme) Zahlbr. (1930)

== C ==
- Caloplaca caesiorufa (Ach.) Flagey (1895)
- Caloplaca caesiorufella (Nyl.) Zahlbr. (1930)
- Caloplaca calicioides P.M.Jørg. (1986)
- Caloplaca cerina (Hedw.) Th.Fr. (1861)
- Caloplaca chlorina (Flot.) Sandst. (1912)
- Caloplaca cinereosquamosa Aptroot (2022) – Brazil
- Caloplaca cinnamomea (Th.Fr.) H.Olivier (1909)
- Caloplaca clauzadeana (Gaya) Nav.-Ros. & Cl.Roux (2009)
- Caloplaca clavatoisidiata S.Y.Kondr., Kärnefelt & Vondrák (2009) – Australia
- Caloplaca clavigera (Stirt.) Zahlbr. (1930)
- Caloplaca coaddita (Nyl.) T.Okamoto (2004)
- Caloplaca coeruleofrigida Søchting & Seppelt (2003)
- Caloplaca concilians (Nyl.) H.Olivier (1909)
- Caloplaca conjungens (Nyl.) Zahlbr. (1930)
- Caloplaca conranii S.Y.Kondr. & Kärnefelt (2007)
- Caloplaca coreana S.Y.Kondr. & Hur (2012)
- Caloplaca craggyensis S.Y.Kondr., Elix & Kärnefelt (2010) – Australia
- Caloplaca cravensis (Clauzade & Wunder) Cl.Roux (2014)
- Caloplaca crocea (Kremp.) Hafellner & Poelt (1979)
- Caloplaca crocina (Kremp.) Wilk & R.Vargas (2017)
- Caloplaca crozetica Zahlbr. (1906)
- Caloplaca cupulifera (Vain.) Zahlbr. (1931)

== D ==
- Caloplaca depauperata (Müll.Arg.) Zahlbr. (1906)
- Caloplaca diphasia (Tuck.) Wetmore (1995)
- Caloplaca dorrigoensis S.Y.Kondr. & Kärnefelt (2009) – Australia
- Caloplaca dzhankoiensis S.Y.Kondr. (2013)

== E ==
- Caloplaca edwardiana J.R.Hoffm. & Lendemer (2019)
- Caloplaca elaeophora (E.S.Hansen, Poelt & Søchting) Alstrup & E.S.Hansen (2001)
- Caloplaca elixii S.Y.Kondr. & Kärnefelt (2004)
- Caloplaca elvebakkiana Søchting, Lorentsen & Arup (2008)
- Caloplaca endodermia Wetmore (1999)
- Caloplaca epiborya S.Y.Kondr. & Kärnefelt (2007)
- Caloplaca epibrya Kantvilas & Søchting (2013)
- Caloplaca epiphora (Taylor) C.W.Dodge (1971)
- Caloplaca eugyra (Tuck.) Zahlbr. (1931)

== F ==
- Caloplaca festivella (Nyl.) Kieff. (1895)
- Caloplaca feuereri S.Y.Kondr., Kärnefelt & A.Thell (2009) – Australia
- Caloplaca filsonii Hafellner, S.Y.Kondr. & Kärnefelt (2007)
- Caloplaca filsoniorum S.Y.Kondr., Kärnefelt & Elix (2009) – Australia
- Caloplaca fissurata Wetmore (2009)
- Caloplaca floridana (Tuck.) S.C.Tucker (1979)
- Caloplaca fluviatilis Vondrák & I.V.Frolov (2019)
- Caloplaca fraserensis S.Y.Kondr. & Kärnefelt (2009) – Australia
- Caloplaca fulva (Schwein.) Halsey (1824)

== G ==
- Caloplaca gambiensis Aptroot (2001)
- Caloplaca granularis (Müll.Arg.) Zahlbr. (1930)
- Caloplaca gyalectoides S.Y.Kondr. & Kärnefelt (2002)
- Caloplaca gypsicola V.Wirth & S.Y.Kondr. (2010)
- Caloplaca gyrophorica Jagad.Ram, Y.Joshi & G.P.Sinha (2013)

== H ==
- Caloplaca haematites (Chaub. ex St.-Amans) Zwackh (1862)
- Caloplaca haematodes (A.Massal.) Zahlbr. (1930)
- Caloplaca haematommona Elix & S.Y.Kondr. (2007)
- Caloplaca hafellneri S.Y.Kondr. & Kärnefelt (2009) – Australia
- Caloplaca hakkodensis (Räsänen) T.Okamoto (2004)
- Caloplaca hallasanensis S.Y.Kondr., S.O.Oh & Hur (2013)
- Caloplaca hanneshertelii S.Y.Kondr. & Kärnefelt (2004)
- Caloplaca herbidella (Hue) H.Magn. (1932)
- Caloplaca hexaspora (Hue) T.Okamoto (2004)
- Caloplaca himalayana Y.Joshi & Upreti (2009) – India
- Caloplaca hnatiukii S.Y.Kondr. & Kärnefelt (2009) – Australia
- Caloplaca hopetounensis S.Y.Kondr. & Kärnefelt (2009) – Australia
- Caloplaca hueana B.de Lesd. (1914)

== I ==
- Caloplaca inclinans (Stirt.) Hellb. (1896)
- Caloplaca indica Y.Joshi, Jagad. Ram & G.P.Sinha (2014)
- Caloplaca irrubescens (Arnold) Zahlbr. (1898)
- Caloplaca isidiosa (Vain.) Zahlbr. 1931)
- Caloplaca isidiosella (Cromb.) R.Sant. 1987)
- Caloplaca isidiosissimus Breuss (2001) – Costa Rica
- Caloplaca itiana Cl.Roux, M.Boulanger & Malle (2009)

== J ==
- Caloplaca jatolensis Y.Joshi & Upreti (2008) – India
- Caloplaca jemtlandica H.Magn. (1945)
- Caloplaca johnwhinrayi S.Y.Kondr. & Kärnefelt (2009) – Australia
- Caloplaca juniperi Poelt & Hinter. (1993)

== K ==
- Caloplaca karadagensis Khodos. & S.Y.Kondr. (2003)
- Caloplaca kashmirensis Y.Joshi & Upreti (2008)
- Caloplaca kedrovopadensis S.Y.Kondr. & Hur (2014) – Russia; South Korea
- Caloplaca kiewkaensis Yakovcz., Galanina & S.Y.Kondr. (2011) – Russian Far East
- Caloplaca kurzii (Kremp.) Zahlbr. (1930)

== L ==
- Caloplaca lactea A.Massal.) Zahlbr. (1901)
- Caloplaca lagunensis Wetmore (1999)
- Caloplaca lecanorae Seavey & J.Seavey (2012)
- Caloplaca lecanorocarpa Aptroot & M.Cáceres (2016) – Brazil
- Caloplaca lecanoroides Lendemer (2010)
- Caloplaca lecapustulata Aptroot & M.Cáceres (2016)
- Caloplaca leptozona (Nyl.) Zahlbr. (1930)
- Caloplaca letrouitioides S.Y. Kondr., Elix & Kärnefelt (2011)
- Caloplaca lignicola Wetmore (2009)
- Caloplaca lithophila H.Magn. (1946)
- Caloplaca litoricola Brodo (1984)
- Caloplaca littorea Tav. (1956)
- Caloplaca lucy-beatrice-mooreae Zahlbr. (1941)
- Caloplaca lypera Poelt & Hinter. (1993)

== M ==
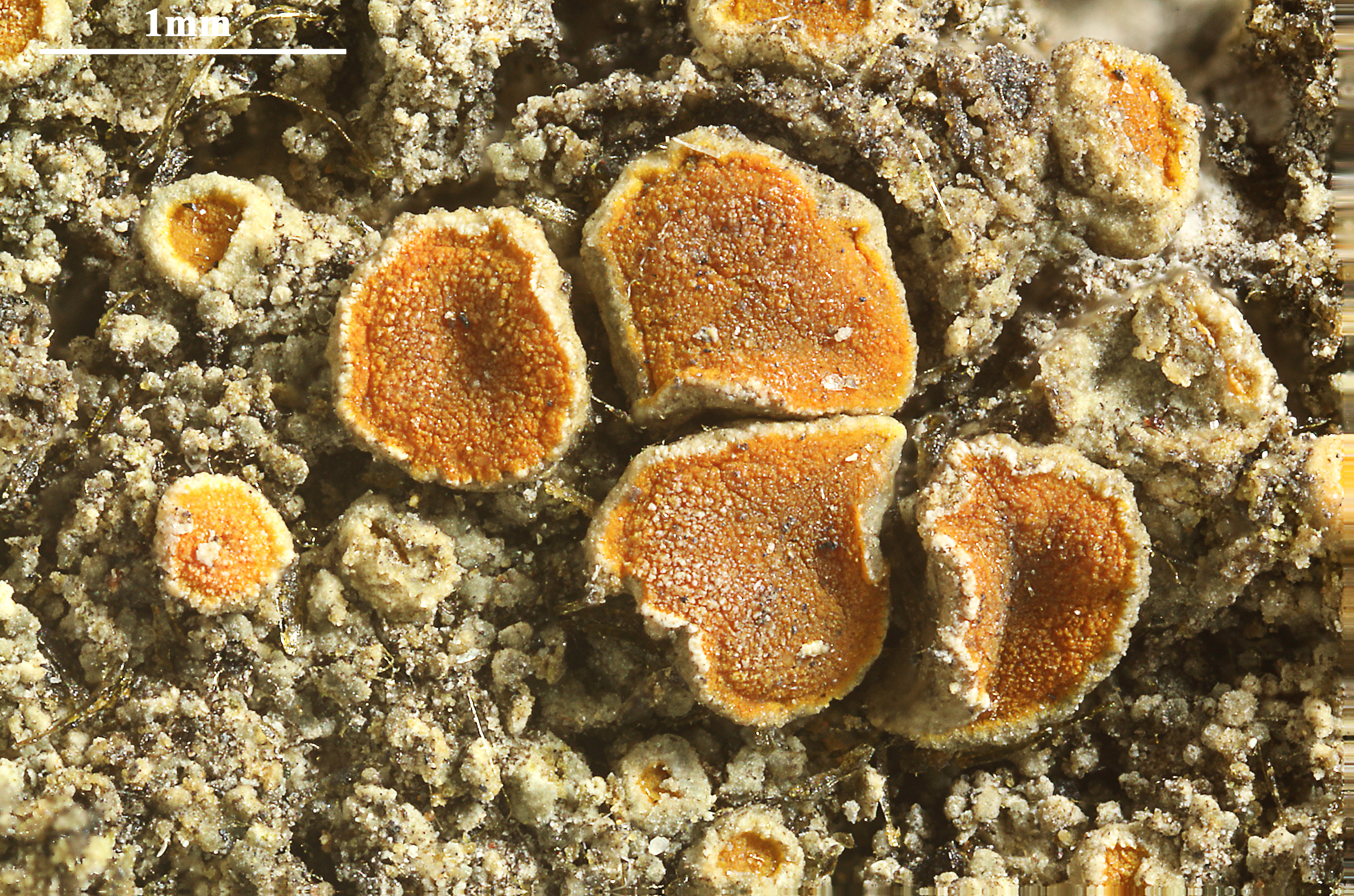
Caloplaca monacensis

- Caloplaca magellanica Søchting & Sancho (2012)
- Caloplaca magnetensis S.Y.Kondr., Elix, Kärnefelt & Kalb (2009)
- Caloplaca magni-filii Poelt (1958)
- Caloplaca magnussoniana S.Y.Kondr., Kärnefelt & A.Thell (2011)
- Caloplaca mallacootensis S.Y.Kondr. & Kärnefelt (2013)
- Caloplaca marchantiorum S.Y.Kondr. & Kärnefelt (2009) – Australia
- Caloplaca megalariicola Øvstedal (2012) – Falkland Islands
- Caloplaca michoacanensis Wetmore (2009)
- Caloplaca microloba (Müll.Arg.) Zahlbr. (1931)
- Caloplaca microthallina Wedd. (1875)
- Caloplaca monacensis (Leder.) Lettau (1912)
- Caloplaca montenegrensis S.Y.Kondr. & Kärnefelt (2013)
- Caloplaca murrayi D.J.Galloway (2004) – New Zealand

== N ==
- Caloplaca nana (Gaya) Nav.-Ros. & Cl.Roux (2009)
- Caloplaca neotropica Wetmore (1995)
- Caloplaca nigra Bungartz & Søchting (2020)
- Caloplaca nigrocarpa Pérez-Vargas & Hern.-Padr. (2014)
- Caloplaca norfolkensis Elix, S.Y.Kondr. & Kärnefelt (2009) – Norfolk Island
- Caloplaca nothocitrina S.Y.Kondr. et J.-S.Hur (2020) – Chile
- Caloplaca nothoholocarpa S.Y.Kondr. et J.-S.Hur (2020) – Chile
- Caloplaca nuraki S.Y.Kondr. & Kudratov (2003)

== O ==
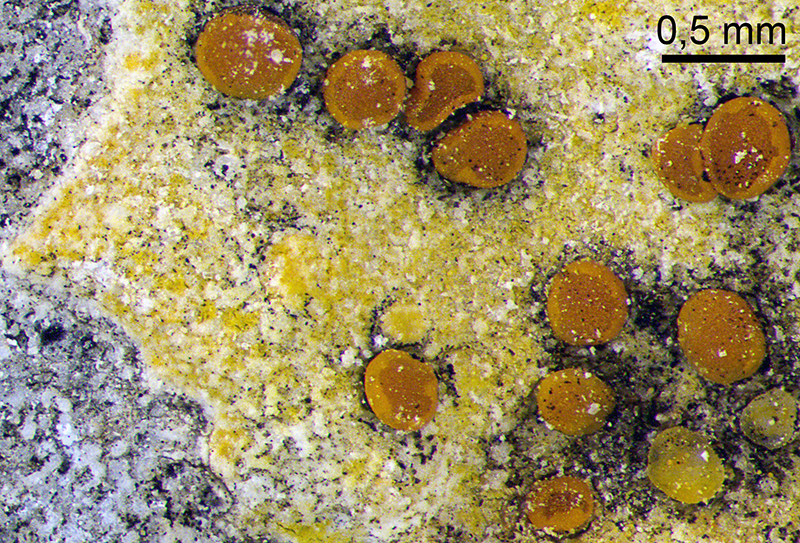
Caloplaca ochracea

- Caloplaca obamae K.Knudsen (2009) – Santa Rosa Island (California)
- Caloplaca obesimarginata Søchting (2004)
- Caloplaca obscurella (J.Lahm ex Körb.) Th.Fr. (1871)
- Caloplaca ochracea (Schaer.) Flagey (1886)
- Caloplaca ochrochroa (Müll.Arg.) Zahlbr. (1930)
- Caloplaca ochrolechioides S.Y.Kondr. & Kärnefelt (2011)
- Caloplaca ochroleuca (Müll.Arg.) S.Y.Kondr. & Kärnefelt (2009)
- Caloplaca orloviana S.Y.Kondr. (2020)

== P ==
- Caloplaca pacifica Wetmore (2009)
- Caloplaca papanui D.J.Galloway (2004)
- Caloplaca parvula Wetmore (1995)
- Caloplaca patagoniensis S.Y.Kondr., S.-O.Oh & J.-S.Hur (2020) – Chile
- Caloplaca patwolseleyae S.Y.Kondr., Jayalal & Hur (2016)
- Caloplaca pellodella (Nyl.) Hasse (1913)
- Caloplaca phaeantha (Nyl.) Zahlbr. (1931)
- Caloplaca phaeocincta S.Y.Kondr. & Elix (2011)
- Caloplaca pinicola H.Magn. (1953)
- Caloplaca piscatorica Kantvilas & S.Y.Kondr. (2013)
- Caloplaca pseudisteroides Y.Joshi & Upreti (2008) – India
- Caloplaca pseudocitrina Khodos. & Kudratov (2002)
- Caloplaca pseudofulgensia Gaya & Nav.-Ros. (2009)
- Caloplaca psoromatis Olech & Søchting (1993)
- Caloplaca pulicarioides Aptroot (1999)
- Caloplaca pygmaea Wetmore (1999)

== Q ==
- Caloplaca queenslandica Kalb, S.Y.Kondr., Elix & Kärnefelt (2010) – Australia

== R ==
- Caloplaca raesaenenii Bredkina (1986)
- Caloplaca rexii S.Y.Kondr. & Kärnefelt (2013)
- Caloplaca rinodinae-albae Poelt & Nimis (1987) – Sardinia
- Caloplaca rossii S.Y.Kondr. & Kärnefelt (2013)
- Caloplaca rubelliana (Ach.) Lojka (1876)
- Caloplaca rubens (Müll.Arg.) Zahlbr. (1930)
- Caloplaca rubentior (Zahlbr.) D.J.Galloway (2004) – New Zealand
- Caloplaca ruderum (Malbr.) J.R.Laundon (1976)

== S ==
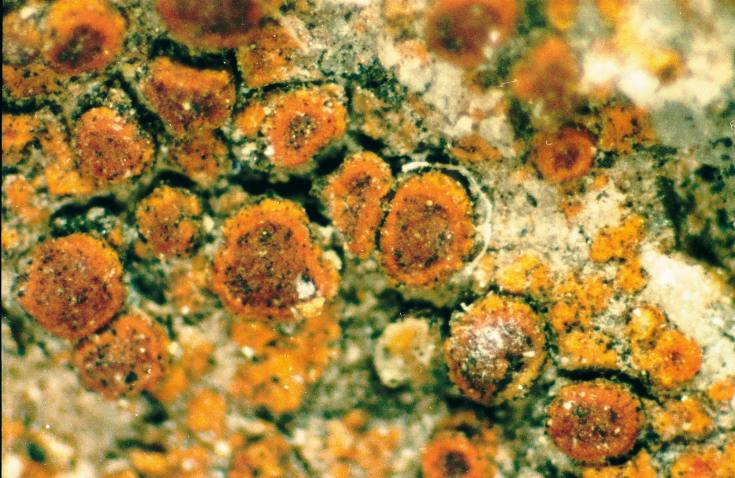
Caloplaca sideritis

- Caloplaca sarcopidoides (Körb.) Zahlbr. (1901)
- Caloplaca saviczii I.V.Frolov, Himelbrant, Stepanchikova, Konoreva & S.Chesnokov (2021)
- Caloplaca schisticola D.J.Galloway (2004)
- Caloplaca schoeferi Poelt (1955)
- Caloplaca schisticola D.J.Galloway (2004) – New Zealand
- Caloplaca schwarzii (F.Schumm & S.Y.Kondr.) Aptroot & Schumm (2019)
- Caloplaca scolecomarginata Søchting & Olech (2000)
- Caloplaca sconensis S.Y.Kondr., Kärnefelt & A.Thell (2011)
- Caloplaca seawardii S.Y.Kondr., Kärnefelt & A.Thell (2009)
- Caloplaca sideritis (Tuck.) Zahlbr. (1911)
- Caloplaca sipmanii S.Y.Kondr., Kärnefelt, Elix & Vondrák (2009)
- Caloplaca sonorae Wetmore (1996)
- Caloplaca soredians (Müll.Arg.) Elix, S.Y.Kondr. & Kärnefelt (2009)
- Caloplaca squamuloisidiata van den Boom & V.J.Rico (2006) – Europe
- Caloplaca stanfordensis H.Magn. (1944)
- Caloplaca sterilis Šoun, Khodos. & Vondrák (2011)
- Caloplaca stewartensis S.Y.Kondr. & Kärnefelt (2009) – Australia
- Caloplaca streimannii S.Y.Kondr. & Kärnefelt (2007) – New South Wales, Australia
- Caloplaca subalpina Vondrák, Šoun & Palice (2008) – Europe
- Caloplaca subbassiae Y.Joshi & Upreti (2008)
- Caloplaca subconcilians S.Y.Kondr., Lőkös & Hur (2013)
- Caloplaca subleptozona Y.Joshi & Upreti (2008) – India
- Caloplaca subochrochroa S.Y.Kondr. & V.Wirth (2010)
- Caloplaca subpoliotera Y.Joshi & Upreti (2008)
- Caloplaca subrubelliana (Vain.) Aptroot (2002)
- Caloplaca subsaxicola S.Y.Kondr., Elix & Kärnefelt (2010) – Australia
- Caloplaca subscopularis (Arup & Frisch) S.Y.Kondr. (2013)
- Caloplaca subsquamosa (Müll.Arg.) Zahlbr. (1931)
- Caloplaca subunicolor (Nyl.) Zahlbr. (1931)

== T ==
- Caloplaca tephromelae Kantvilas, Suija & Motiej. (2021) – Australia
- Caloplaca thracopontica Vondrák & Šoun (2008)
- Caloplaca thuringiaca Søchting & Stordeur (2001) – Europe
- Caloplaca tibellii S.Y.Kondr. & Kärnefelt (2009) – Australia
- Caloplaca tomnashii S.Y.Kondr., Elix & Kärnefelt (2011)
- Caloplaca tropica Y.Joshi & Upreti (2007)
- Caloplaca tswaluensis Fryday, S.Svoboda & D.A.Ward (2024)
- Caloplaca turkuensis (Vain.) Zahlbr. (1932)

== U ==
- Caloplaca ulcerata Poelt & Hinter. (1993)
- Caloplaca ulleungensis S.Y.Kondr., Lőkös & Hur (2020) - South Korea
- Caloplaca ulmorum (Fink) (Fink 1935)
- Caloplaca umbrinofusca (Nyl.) H.Olivier (1909)
- Caloplaca urceolata B.de Lesd. (1932)
- Caloplaca ursina Lynge (1926)

== V ==
- Caloplaca vainioi Hafellner & Poelt (1979)
- Caloplaca virescens (Sm.) Coppins (1980)
- Caloplaca viridirufa (Ach.) Zahlbr. (1931)
- Caloplaca vitellinaria Szatala (1956)
- Caloplaca volkii V.Wirth & Vězda (1975) – Namibia
- Caloplaca vorukhica S.Y.Kondr. & Kudratov (2003)

== W ==
- Caloplaca wallabyensis Elix, S.Y.Kondr. & Kärnefelt (2010) – Australia
- Caloplaca wasseri Khodos. & S.Y.Kondr. (2007)
- Caloplaca wesselsii S.Y.Kondr. & V.Wirth (2010) – Namibia
- Caloplaca wrightii (Tuck.) Fink (1935)

== X ==
- Caloplaca xanthobola (Kremp.) Zahlbr. (1931)
- Caloplaca xanthopa (Hue) Zahlbr. (1931)
- Caloplaca xerica Poelt & Vězda (1975)
- Caloplaca xochitepea B.de Lesd. (1935)
- Caloplaca xochitepecensis B.de Lesd. (1933)

== Y ==
- Caloplaca yammeraensis S.Y.Kondr., Kärnefelt & Elix (2009) – Australia
- Caloplaca yeosuensis S.Y.Kondr. & Hur (2017)

== Z ==
- Caloplaca zavattarii Sambo (1939) – Ethiopia
- Caloplaca zeorina B.G.Lee & Hur (2018) – China
