= Caloplaca bartlettii =

Scientific classification
- Domain: Eukaryota
- Kingdom: Fungi
- Division: Ascomycota
- Class: Lecanoromycetes
- Order: Teloschistales
- Family: Teloschistaceae
- Genus: Caloplaca
- Species: C. bartlettii

Binomial name
- Caloplaca bartlettii S.Y.Kondr. & Kärnefelt (2009)

Species of lichen

Caloplaca bartlettii is a species of saxicolous (rock-dwelling), crustose lichen in the family Teloschistaceae. It is found in Tasmania and New Zealand, where it grows on coastal rock outcrops.

== Taxonomy ==
The lichen was formally described as a new species in 2009 by lichenologists Sergey Kondratyuk and Ingvar Kärnefelt. The type specimen was collected from Kapowairua, a locality at the eastern end of Spirits Bay (North Island), where it was found growing on coastal rocks above sea level. The species epithet honours New Zealand botanist John Bartlett, who collected the type species in 1984.

== Description ==
The crustose, areolate thallus is 3–10 mm (0.1–0.4 in) wide (although neighbouring lichens will often coalesce to form larger patches), with a greenish-yellow to whitish or greyish-yellow colour. The main identifying field characteristic of Caloplaca bartlettii are its densely aggregated, mostly biatorine apothecia. Microscopically, another characteristic of the lichen are the large bermaguina-type oil droplets in its paraphyses. Parietin is the major lichen product that occurs in the species.

== See also ==
- List of Caloplaca species
