= Caloplaca hnatiukii =

Scientific classification
- Kingdom: Fungi
- Division: Ascomycota
- Class: Lecanoromycetes
- Order: Teloschistales
- Family: Teloschistaceae
- Genus: Caloplaca
- Species: C. hnatiukii

Binomial name
- Caloplaca hnatiukii S.Y.Kondr. & Kärnefelt (2009)
- Holotype site: Lake King, Western Australia

Species of lichen

Caloplaca hnatiukii is a species of lichen in the family Teloschistaceae. Found in Australia and New Zealand, it was formally described as a new species in 2009 by lichenologists Sergey Kondratyuk and Ingvar Kärnefelt. The type specimen was collected from Lake King, Western Australia, where it was found growing on the stems of Pachycornia tenuis, often together with the crustose lichen Caloplaca gyalectoides. The species epithet honours Australian botanist Roger Hnatiuk, who collected the type in 1976.

== See also ==
- List of Caloplaca species
