= Sungri =

Coordinates: 31°19′N 77°42′E

Sungri is a hill station in Himachal Pradesh, India. It is located in the Rohru block and comes under the administration of Bhaloon panchayat. As a hill station, it is a popular travel destination popular among domestic tourists. Nice place to visit and famous for tracking among local people
