= Caloplaca kedrovopadensis =

Scientific classification
- Domain: Eukaryota
- Kingdom: Fungi
- Division: Ascomycota
- Class: Lecanoromycetes
- Order: Teloschistales
- Family: Teloschistaceae
- Genus: Caloplaca
- Species: C. kedrovopadensis

Binomial name
- Caloplaca kedrovopadensis S.Y.Kondr. & Hur (2014)

Species of lichen

Caloplaca kedrovopadensis is a little-known species of crustose lichen in the family Teloschistaceae. It is only found in the Kedrovaya Pad Nature Reserve in the Russian Far East, and on the Jiri Mountain of South Korea. The lichen has been recorded growing on rocks and on bark.

== Taxonomy ==
Caloplaca kedrovopadensis was formally described as a new species in 2014 by lichenologists Sergei Kondratyuk and Jae-Seoun Hur. The type specimen was collected by the authors from the Land of the Leopard National Park in Khasansky District (Primorsky Krai). There, at an altitude of 163 m (535 ft), on a slope in a deciduous forest, the lichen was found growing on silicate rocks. It is only known from the type locality; the species epithet refers to the Kedrovaya Pad Nature Reserve, which contains the type locality.

== Description ==
The crustose thallus of Caloplaca kedrovopadensis is thin, continuous to cracked, and greenish-yellow in colour. It has many apothecia (spore-bearing structures), which measure 0.3–0.55 mm in diameter. Its asci can hold eight spores, but they often instead have 1, 2, 4, or sometimes 6 of the mature, bipolar spores. These ascospores are spindle-shaped (fusiform) with tapered ends, split into two cells by a central septum (hence, "bipolar"), and measure 19–26 by 8.5–10 μm.

== Habitat and distribution ==
Caloplaca kedrovopadensis was first recorded from the Kedrovaya Pad Nature Reserve in Russia, and a few years later, from the Jiri Mountain of South Korea, at an altitude of 1,314 m (4,311 ft). Both of the Korean collections were found growing on bark. Phaeophyscia exornatula, Verrucaria species, and Aspicilia species are other lichens that have been noted to grow in close association with Caloplaca kedrovopadensis.

== See also ==
- List of Caloplaca species
