= Caloplaca beaugleholei =

Scientific classification
- Kingdom: Fungi
- Division: Ascomycota
- Class: Lecanoromycetes
- Order: Teloschistales
- Family: Teloschistaceae
- Genus: Caloplaca
- Species: C. beaugleholei

Binomial name
- Caloplaca beaugleholei S.Y.Kondr. & Kärnefelt (2009)
- Holotype site: Bermagui, New South Wales

Species of lichen

Caloplaca beaugleholei is a species of corticolous (bark-dwelling), crustose lichen in the family Teloschistaceae. Found in Australia, it was formally described as a new species in 2009 by lichenologists Sergey Kondratyuk and Ingvar Kärnefelt. The type specimen was collected by the authors on the top of a cliff near Marine Drive by Breakaway Beach (Bermagui, New South Wales); there, in a Eucalyptus forest, it was found growing on the bark of a dying Casuarina plant. The species epithet honours Australian botanist Alexander Clifford Beauglehole, who had this rarely collected species in his extensive collection of botanical specimens. Caloplaca beaugleholei occurs in Western Australia, New South Wales, and Victoria.

== See also ==
- List of Caloplaca species
