= Caloplaca caesiorufella =

Scientific classification
- Kingdom: Fungi
- Division: Ascomycota
- Class: Lecanoromycetes
- Order: Teloschistales
- Family: Teloschistaceae
- Genus: Caloplaca
- Species: C. caesiorufella

Binomial name
- Caloplaca caesiorufella (Nyl.) Zahlbr. 1930

Synonyms
- Lecanora caesiorufella Nyl. (1885); Lecidea caesiorufella (Nyl.) Hue (1914); Blastenia caesiorufella (Nyl.) Oxner (1990)

Species of lichen

Caloplaca caesiorufella is a species of crustose lichen in the family Teloschistaceae. It is found in Europe and the Russian Far East. It was described as a new species in 1885 by the Finnish lichenologist William Nylander, who placed it in the genus Lecanora. Alexander Zahlbruckner gave it the binomial name by which it is now known when he reclassified it in genus Caloplaca in 1930. Although the species has long been cited under Caloplaca, molecular work indicates that it falls outside Caloplaca in the strict sense (sensu stricto) and has no clear generic placement within Teloschistaceae; for that reason it has been treated as "Caloplaca" (with quotation marks) in some modern accounts.

The lichen has been treated as an arctic to northern boreal circumpolar species, and it is common on the Commander Islands in the Russian Far East, where it occurs in coastal, tundra and floodplain habitats, growing mainly on driftwood and on the bark of shrubs.

== See also ==
- List of Caloplaca species
