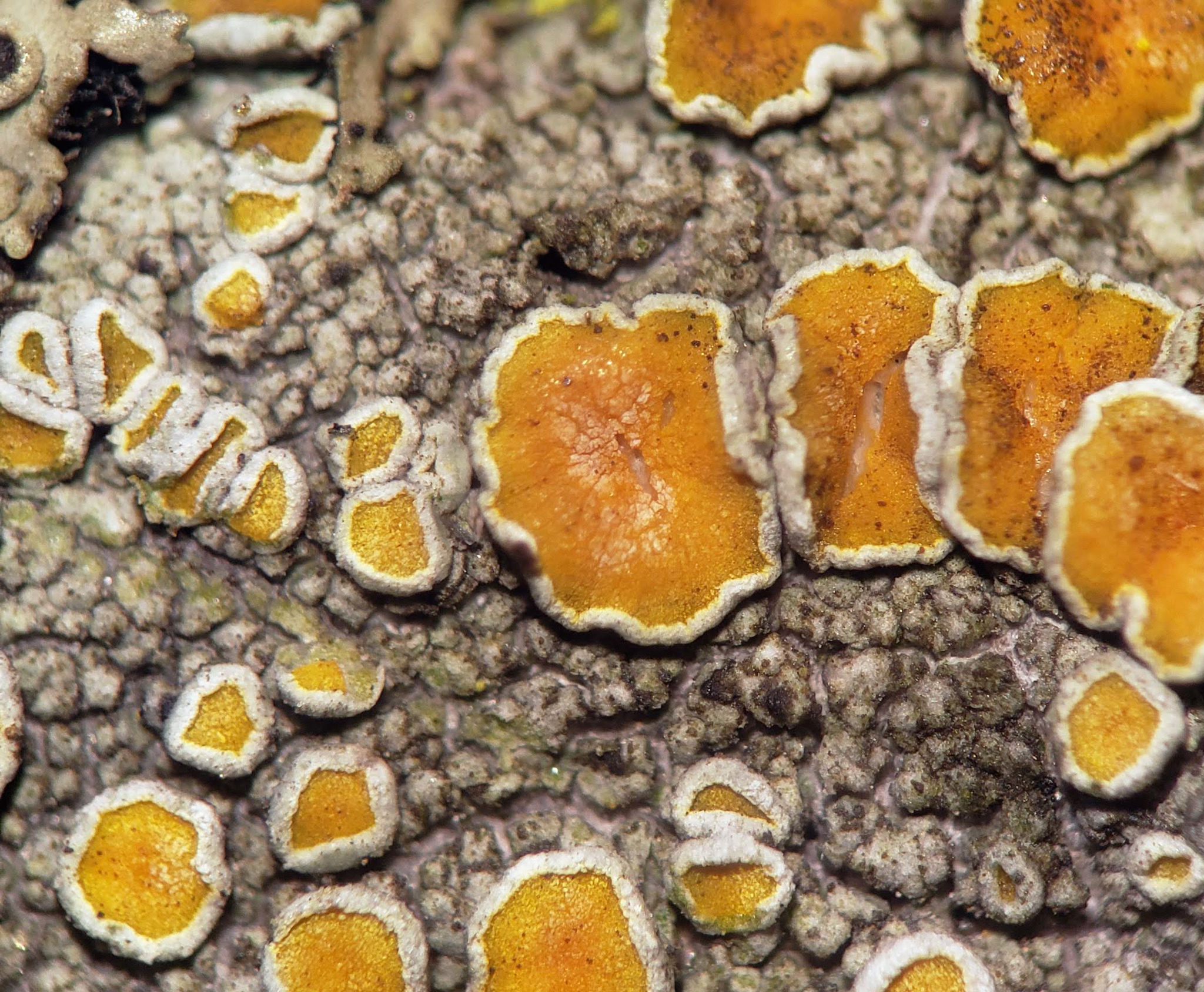

Scientific classification
- Domain: Eukaryota
- Kingdom: Fungi
- Division: Ascomycota
- Class: Lecanoromycetes
- Order: Teloschistales
- Family: Teloschistaceae
- Genus: Caloplaca
- Species: C. cerina

Binomial name
- Caloplaca cerina Ehrh. ex Hedwig

= Caloplaca cerina =

Species of lichen

Caloplaca cerina, also known as the gray-rimmed firedot lichen, is a species of lichen. It is part of the monophyletic Caloplaca cerina species group and is the type species of the genus Caloplaca.

== Description ==
Caloplaca cerina has a crustose thallus, typically dark grey to white. It has a thalline margin, although this is sometimes thin and difficult to note. However its appearance can be very variable; as a result, many specimens that have been identified as Caloplaca cerina are actually other species. One study that examined 3,000 specimens of Caloplaca cerina found that roughly 1,000 were other species.

== Distribution ==
It is very common on tree bark, particularly on poplar and elm trees.

== See also ==
- List of Caloplaca species
