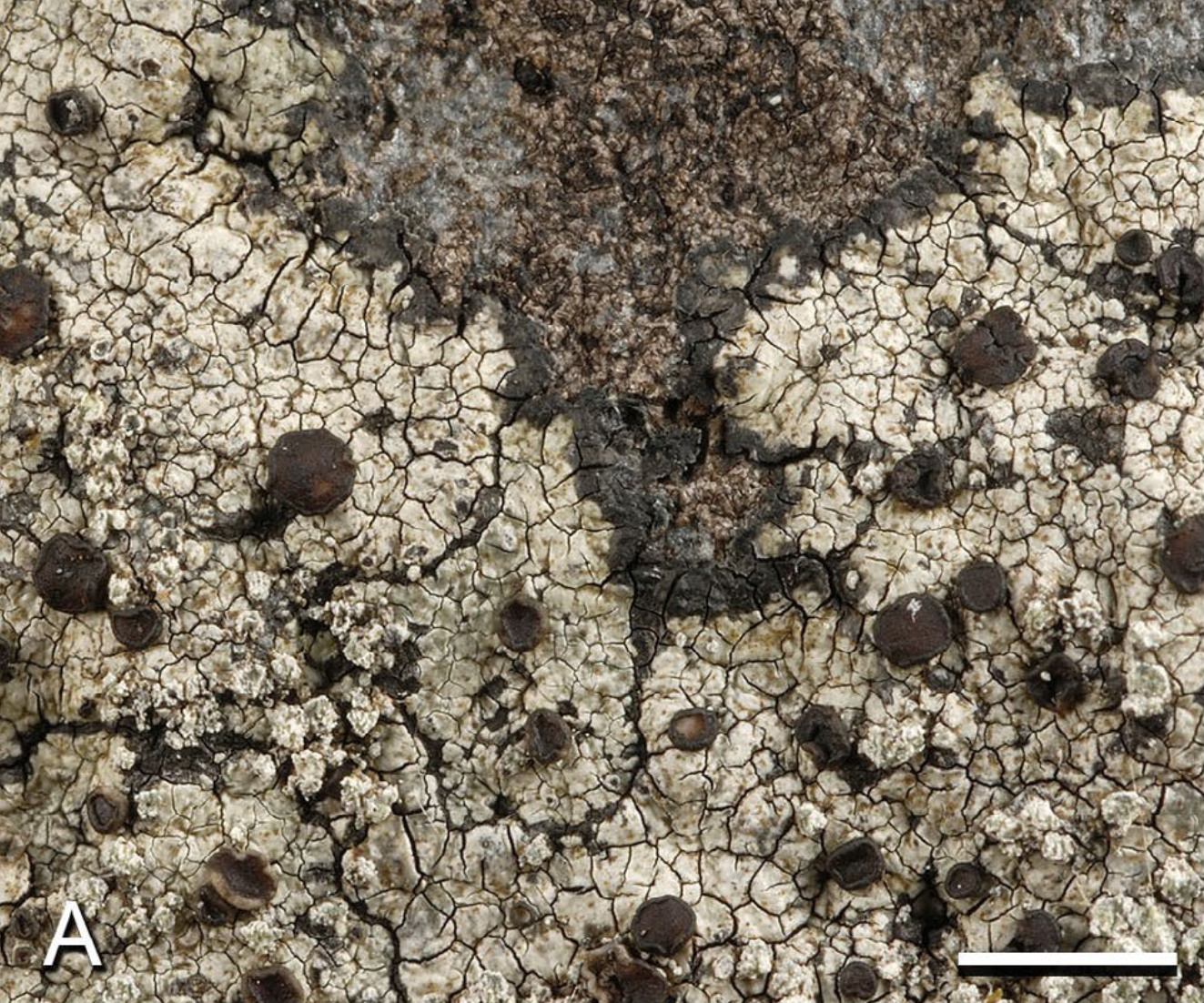
- Sucioplaca diplacia; scale bar = 2 mm

Scientific classification
- Kingdom: Fungi
- Division: Ascomycota
- Class: Lecanoromycetes
- Order: Teloschistales
- Family: Teloschistaceae
- Genus: Sucioplaca; Bungartz, Søchting & Arup (2020)
- Species: S. diplacia

Binomial name
- Sucioplaca diplacia (Ach.) Bungartz, Søchting & Arup (2020)

Synonyms
- Lecanora diplacia Ach. (1814); Patellaria diplacia (Ach.) Spreng. (1827); Placodium diplacium (Ach.) Vain. (1915); Caloplaca diplacia (Ach.) Riddle (1918); Callopisma diplacium (Ach.) Malme (1926)

= Sucioplaca =

Genus of lichen

Sucioplaca is a single-species fungal genus in the family Teloschistaceae. It contains Sucioplaca diplacia, a saxicolous (rock-dwelling) crustose lichen. It is common and widely distributed in the Caribbean, Central America, and the Galápagos Islands, where it grows on coastal rocks.

== Taxonomy ==
The genus Sucioplaca was formally proposed in 2020 by the lichenologists Frank Bungartz, Ulrik Søchting, and Ulf Arup. The name of the genus is derived from merging -placa, alluding to Caloplaca (the genus from which its species was reclassified), with sucio-, the Spanish term for "dirty". This reference is a nod to the dust-laden habitats near the ground where the sole known species of this genus is commonly found. Sucioplaca is in the subfamily Caloplacoideae of the family Teloschistaceae, where it is uniquely situated in a distinct clade, marking its isolated position within this grouping. Sucioplaca diplacia was originally described by Erik Acharius in 1814 as a species of Lecanora. In its taxonomic history, it has been proposed for inclusion in the genera Patellaria, Placodium, Caloplaca, and Callopisma.

== Description ==
The lichen Sucioplaca diplacia has a thallus, or main body, that varies from cracked (rimose) to a cracked and patchy (rimose-areolate) appearance. It ranges from thin to thick, generally bordered by a compact, blackish outline known as a prothallus. Although individual thalli can merge and blend with each other, they are usually distinct. The surface of Sucioplaca diplacia is dark to pale bluish-grey, occasionally with a pink tint, and has a smooth texture. It lacks a powdery coating (epruinose) and features pimple-like (pustulate) soralia, which are structures for asexual reproduction, measuring 0.2–0.7 mm in diameter. These soralia contain pale green soredia, small granulular propagules, which may appear bluish-black when not eroded.

Apothecia (fruiting bodies) are typically absent in Sucioplaca diplacia. If present, they are scattered or loosely grouped, sometimes deformed as if forming galls. They are seated (sessile) and small, usually less than 1 mm in diameter, with a lecanorine appearance (having a distinct margin), but can resemble other types. Initially pale, they darken with age, turning reddish-black. The margin of the apothecia is waxy, smooth, and initially pale, turning black over time. The disc, or central part, follows a similar colour transformation, from pale to deeply blackened, and is also smooth and epruinose. The epihymenium, or upper layer above the spore-bearing tissue, is reddish-orange to violaceous and reacts yellowish-brown with the C chemical spot test. The hymenium, or spore-bearing layer, is clear (hyaline) and uncluttered. The structure surrounding the hymenium is poorly defined, with few hyaline hyphae (filamentous fungal cells).

The thalline exciple (the thallus-like layer around the hymenium) consists of three parts: a central part with abundant algae (photobionts), a transitional part with small crystals dissolving in potassium hydroxide (K), and an outer part that becomes pigmented with age. The subhymenium and hypothecium, supporting layers beneath the hymenium, are greyish and hyaline respectively. The asci, or spore sacs, are club-shaped (clavate) and of the Teloschistes type. Each ascus contains eight two-celled, broadly ellipsoid to almost spherical spores, with a thick septum. Pycnidia (asexual reproductive structures) have not been observed in this species.

Secondary metabolites (lichen products) that occur in the thallus of Sucioplaca diplacia include atranorin, isofulgidin, vicanicin, and caloploicin. The expected results of standard chemical spot tests on the thallus are P+ (yellow), K+ (yellow), C−, and KC−; all spot tests on the apothecia are negative.
