= Caloplaca cupulifera =

Scientific classification
- Domain: Eukaryota
- Kingdom: Fungi
- Division: Ascomycota
- Class: Lecanoromycetes
- Order: Teloschistales
- Family: Teloschistaceae
- Genus: Caloplaca
- Species: C. cupulifera

Binomial name
- Caloplaca cupulifera (Vain.) Zahlbr. (1931)

Synonyms
- Placodium cupuliferum Vain. (1915)

Species of lichen

Caloplaca cupulifera is a widely distributed species of saxicolous (rock-dwelling), crustose lichen in the family Teloschistaceae. It has a chrome-yellow thallus with bright yellow cup-shaped soredia (powdery vegetative propagules). Although originally described as a new species in 1915 and placed in the large genus Caloplaca in 1931, modern molecular phylogenetics suggests that its classification requires an update.

== Taxonomy ==
The lichen was first formally described as a new species in 1915 by Finnish lichenologist Edvard August Vainio as a member of the genus Placodium. The type specimen was collected by Frederik Børgesen from Saint John, one of the Virgin Islands. Alexander Zahlbruckner transferred it to the Caloplaca in 1931.

Modern molecular phylogenetic studies have affirmed the placement of this species in this subfamily Teloschistoideae in the family Teloschistaceae. These results demonstrate that its genetic lineage is distinct from the Caloplaca (in the strict sense), a genus that is part of the subfamily Caloplacoideae.

== Description ==
Caloplaca cupulifera is distinguished by its rimose-areolate to areolate thallus, with marginal areoles that are irregularly lobate but not distinctly effigurate or placodioid. The thallus has a deep chrome-yellow colour, with a smooth yet dull and non-shiny surface. This species is characterised by its unique crateriform (or 'cupuliform') soralia, measuring 0.2–0.4 mm in diameter. These soralia are often deeply abraded, showing excavate features with granular, bright yellow soredia (15–34 μm in diameter). Apothecia have not been observed to occur in this species.

The secondary chemical makeup of Caloplaca cupulifera includes fragilin, a lichen product that contributes to the thallus's chrome-yellow colour and the soredia's bright yellow hue. Other compounds such as 7-chloroemodinal, 7-chloroemodic acid, 7-chloroemodin, and norcaloploicin are occasionally present in smaller amounts.

== Habitat and distribution ==
Caloplaca cupulifera is believed to have a potentially global distribution in dry (sub-)tropical regions. Originally reported from the New World, including Mexico, Central America, the Caribbean, Brazil, and the Galapagos, it has also been recorded from Australia. In the Galapagos, it is quite common, especially along the coast and in the dry zone, where it typically grows beneath shaded and sheltered rock overhangs. The species has uniform internal transcribed spacer (ITS) DNA sequence data in specimens from the Galapagos, while those from Australia have slightly different ITS sequences, suggesting the presence of various genotypes across different global regions. In northern North America, Caloplaca cupulifera grows on acidic rocks on the western coast, with a range extending north to northern Oregon and south to northern Baja California. It is widely distributed in India, where it grows on both calcareous and non-calcareous rocks in moist and dry habitats of temperate to tropical areas. It is one of two saxicolous lichens implicated in the slow degradation of the Konark Sun Temple in India.

== See also ==
- List of Caloplaca species
