= Filsoniana ferdinandmuelleri =

Scientific classification
- Domain: Eukaryota
- Kingdom: Fungi
- Division: Ascomycota
- Class: Lecanoromycetes
- Order: Teloschistales
- Family: Teloschistaceae
- Genus: Filsoniana
- Species: F. ferdinandmuelleri

Binomial name
- Filsoniana ferdinandmuelleri (S.Y.Kondr. & Kärnefelt) S.Y.Kondr., Kärnefelt, Elix, A.Thell & Hur (2013)

Synonyms
- Caloplaca ferdinandmuelleri S.Y.Kondr. & Kärnefelt (2009)

Species of lichen

Filsoniana ferdinandmuelleri is a species of saxicolous (rock-dwelling), crustose lichen in the family Teloschistaceae. It is found in Australia. The lichen has a squamulose (scaly) thallus, with a range of bright yellow to greenish-yellow and brownish-orange colours in its soredia (powdery propagules) and apothecia (fruiting bodies), respectively. The areoles of this lichen are varied in size, slightly raised from the thallus surface, and each carries one to four apothecia. The soralia are rounded or irregularly shaped, covering most of the thallus surface as a yellow to greenish-yellow mass. The apothecia have dark brownish-orange discs, surrounded by slightly paler yellow margins, with the spore-bearing asci containing typically eight brownish-golden ascospores.

== Taxonomy ==
It was formally described as a new species in 2009 by the lichenologists Sergey Kondratyuk and Ingvar Kärnefelt, who initially classified it as a member of the genus Caloplaca. The type specimen was collected by Kondratyuk in the Royal Botanic Gardens in Melbourne, Victoria. The specimen was found near the "Temple of the Winds" and "Plant Craft Cottage buildings," amid 'grey plants' and succulents, growing on volcanic rocks known as tuffs. It was growing alongside Filsoniana rexfilsonii, which, at the time, was also a member of Caloplaca. In 2013, the taxon Caloplaca ferdinandmuelleri was formally transferred to the newly proposed genus Filsoniana, as part of a molecular phylogenetics-informed restructuring of the family Teloschistaceae. Gintaras Kantvilas (who prefers to maintain this taxon in a broadly defined genus Caloplaca) suggests that it is likely a sorediate counterpart to Filsoniana rexfilsonii.

== Description ==
Filsoniana ferdinandmuelleri is characterised by its squamulose thallus, which has a vibrant colour palette ranging from bright yellow to greenish-yellow soredia (powdery vegetative propagules) and brownish-orange apothecia (fruiting bodies). The areoles of this lichen, measuring between 0.4 and 2.7 mm in width and 100 to 200 μm in thickness, contain palisade inclusions. Initially, these areoles lie close to the substrate but gradually become more raised, with their edges curling upwards. The upper surface of the areoles is uneven, with a brownish-yellow to dull yellow colouration. Typically, each areole bears one to four apothecia and one to five conidiomata (asexual reproductive structures), either separately or in combination.

The soralia measure between 0.1 and 0.2 mm in diameter, and are found along the edges or at the ends of the upper thallus surface. They are rounded to irregular in shape, with a sorediose mass covering most of the surface. This mass is bright yellow to greenish-yellow in colour, and the soredia within are approximately round, measuring between 20 and 25 μm in diameter.

The apothecia of Filsoniana ferdinandmuelleri are 0.3 to 0.7 mm in diameter and 0.2 to 0.25 mm thick. They are scattered or weakly aggregated, featuring dark brownish-orange discs that lack a powdery coating (pruina) and are surrounded by slightly paler yellowish margins. The true exciple (the outer layer of the apothecium) varies from scleroplectenchymatous to somewhat paraplectenchymatous in structure. The asci (spore-bearing structures) typically contain eight spores, which are often brownish-golden in colour. These ascospores have widely rounded ends, measuring between 13 and 17 μm in length and 6 to 8 μm in width, with moderately thick septa ranging from 3 to 6 μm. The conidiomata of this lichen are 40 to 50 μm in diameter, with long, rod-shaped conidia measuring 4 to 5.5 μm by 0.8 to 1 μm.

Chemically, the epithecium of Filsoniana ferdinandmuelleri reacts to a solution of potassium hydroxide (i.e., the K spot test) by turning purple. It contains several secondary metabolites (lichen products), including parietin as the major constituent, along with argopsin, atranorin, teloschistin, fallacinal as minor components, and traces of parietinic acid.

== Habitat and distribution ==
Filsoniana ferdinandmuelleri has been identified in a few scattered locations across Western Australia, Victoria, and Tasmania, suggesting a distribution that spans significant parts of southeastern and southwestern Australia. It is typically found growing on terrestrial substrates, particularly favouring dolerite and volcanic rocks. In these environments, it is often found in association with other lichen species such as F. rexfilsonii and Kuettlingeria atroflava. On Kangaroo Island, it has been recorded growing on siliceous rocks (including sandstone) in mallee woodland.
