= Filsoniana lhasanensis =

Scientific classification
- Kingdom: Fungi
- Division: Ascomycota
- Class: Lecanoromycetes
- Order: Teloschistales
- Family: Teloschistaceae
- Genus: Filsoniana
- Species: F. lhasanensis

Binomial name
- Filsoniana lhasanensis X.M.Wen, Shahidin & A.Abbas (2020)

Species of lichen

Filsoniana lhasanensis is a species of saxicolous (rock-dwelling), crustose lichen in the family Teloschistaceae. It is found in Tibet, where it grows on rocks at altitudes between 4,200 and 4,432 m (13,780 and 14,541 ft). This species is defined by its reduced, vivid orange appearance and unique, aggregated reproductive structures.

== Taxonomy ==
It was formally described as a new species in 2020 by Xue-Mei Wen, Hurnisa Shahidin, and Abdulla Abbas. The species epithet lhasanensis refers to Lhasa City, where the type specimen was collected. This was the first report of a Filsoniana species in China.

== Description ==
The Filsoniana lhasanensis lichen is characterised by its crust-like structure, known as a thallus, which is areolate (appearing as small individual patches). This thallus, which ranges from 0.1 to 0.2 mm in diameter, has a bright orange to deep orange hue. Unique to this species, the thallus is often minimal or even absent, mainly concentrating around its reproductive structures, or apothecia. These apothecia are numerous and typically cluster together. They are distinguishable by their bright yellow to deep orange margins, while the central disc can be coloured from yellow-orange to signal orange. These discs are round to irregularly shaped, spanning 0.3 to 0.7 mm in diameter. The outer layer (the exciple) measures between 9.6 and 14.8 μm in thickness.

Internally, the hymenium (the fertile, reproductive layer within the apothecia) is colourless and ranges from 52.2 to 89.5 μm in height. The lichen's asci have a teloschistes-type form and contain eight spores each. These spores are colourless and ellipsoid in shape. Chemical tests reveals the presence of parietin, emodin, and two unknown anthraquinones in the lichen's composition.

Morphologically, the Filsoniana lhasanensis shares similarities with another lichen species, Xanthocarpia ferrarii. However, differences in their structural components, spore size, and classification help distinguish the two. Notably, Filsoniana lhasanensis thallus appears reduced, with only a few scattered areoles, which makes it stand out when compared to its closely related counterparts like F. australiensis and F. rexfilsonii.

== Habitat and distribution ==
Preferring rocky terrains, Filsoniana lhasanensis is found in open areas, typically co-existing with other lichen species including Aspicilia, Lecanora, and Rusavskia, among others. This lichen thrives in the arid and semi-arid regions of Lhasa and Shannan cities, situated at elevations ranging from 4,200 to 4,432 m (13,780 to 14,541 ft). Another specimen was identified near Yamzho Yumco in Shannan City, further confirming its presence in the region.
