= Thelliana =

Scientific classification
- Kingdom: Fungi
- Division: Ascomycota
- Class: Lecanoromycetes
- Order: Teloschistales
- Family: Teloschistaceae
- Genus: Thelliana; S.Y.Kondr., Kärnefelt, Elix & Hur (2015)
- Species: T. pseudokiamae

Binomial name
- Thelliana pseudokiamae S.Y.Kondr., Kärnefelt, Elix & Hur (2015)

Single-species fungal genus

Thelliana is a single-species fungal genus in the family Teloschistaceae. It comprises the species Thelliana pseudokiamae, a crustose lichen. It forms a dull brownish-yellow to brownish-orange crust on rock surfaces, and is known only from South Australia. Later phylogenetic studies have questioned its placement, suggesting that Thelliana may belong within the genus Filsoniana.

== Taxonomy ==
Thelliana was described by Sergey Kondratyuk and colleagues in 2015 for T. pseudokiamae, an Australian lichen that is the type and only species of the genus. On the basis of combined data of three genetic markers (ITS, LSU, and mitochondrial SSU sequence data), they treated it as a distinct lineage in the family Teloschistaceae and placed it in the newly proposed subfamily Brownlielloideae. The generic name honours the Swedish lichenologist Arne Thell. The species epithet pseudokiamae was chosen to reflect the species' similarity to Filsoniana kiamae.

Wen and colleagues in 2019 re-examined these relationships and argued that the Brownlielloideae concept used in the 2015 study was affected by contaminant SSU data. In their analysis, Thelliana pseudokiamae grouped with species of Filsoniana within Teloschistoideae rather than in a separate subfamily, indicating a different interpretation of its higher-level placement. Wilk and colleagues later revisited the Brownlielloideae concept and concluded that it had been based on a chimeric DNA data set. In their revised phylogeny, Thelliana was placed within Teloschistoideae, in the Filsoniana clade, and was treated as a putative synonym of Filsoniana.

== Description ==
Thelliana forms a crust-like thallus broken into small areoles that are dull brownish yellow to dull brownish orange. The areoles are flat to slightly concave, with wavy margins that often turn upwards. Older areoles may become thicker, develop transverse cracks, and cluster densely along rock crevices. Small bright yellow blastidia or minute soralia are sparse and often difficult to see. The cortex is composed of tightly packed cells, and the genus produces rare, small biatorine apothecia with reddish-orange discs and proper margins. In the type material, only juvenile apothecia were observed, so mature asci and ascospores have not yet been described.

In their comparison of related taxa, Wen and colleagues likewise characterised T. pseudokiamae as having a brownish-yellow thallus with rare brighter yellow blastidia or point-like (punctiform) soralia, unlike the more strongly developed thalli seen in some species of Filsoniana.

== Habitat and distribution ==
Thelliana is a saxicolous (rock-dwelling) genus known only from Australia, and Kondratyuk and colleagues recorded it specifically from South Australia. The type and only known species, T. pseudokiamae, was collected on rock surfaces about 12 km southwest of Quorn, where it grew on rock surfaces and in crevices. At the type locality it occurred with other saxicolous lichens, including species of Acarospora, Buellia, Verrucaria, and Xanthoparmelia, as well as other lichens with cyanobacterial partners (cyanolichens).
