= Parvoplaca nigroblastidiata =

Scientific classification
- Domain: Eukaryota
- Kingdom: Fungi
- Division: Ascomycota
- Class: Lecanoromycetes
- Order: Teloschistales
- Family: Teloschistaceae
- Genus: Parvoplaca
- Species: P. nigroblastidiata

Binomial name
- Parvoplaca nigroblastidiata Arup, Halıcı & Vondrák (2015)

Species of lichen

Parvoplaca nigroblastidiata is a species of corticolous (bark-dwelling), crustose lichen in the family Teloschistaceae. Found in Europe and Alaska, it was formally described as a new species in 2015 by Ulf Arup, Jan Vondrák, and Mehmet Halıcı. The type specimen was collected in the Nyhem Parish, Jämtland (Sweden), where it was growing on the bark of Populus tremula. In Turkey, it has been recorded at high altitudes on the bark of Juniperus excelsa and Abies cilicica, while in a single record from Alaska it is growing on Populus. In 2018 it was reported from the sacred groves of Epirus in Greece, and in 2020 from Norway.

== Description ==
The main distinguishing characteristics of Parvoplaca nigroblastidiata include its endophloeodal thallus (i.e., immersed in the bark substrate), the black blastidia that resemble small spots (the species epithet refers to this feature), and zeorin-lecanorine apothecia featuring an orange disc and a black thalline margin. Caloplaca turkuensis is a similar in appearance and morphology, but differs in the form of the apothecia and the dark grey-black instead of grey thalline margin. Other potential lookalikes include Caloplaca ahtii and Caloplaca turkuensis.

Both the disc of the apothecia and the true exciple contain the lichen product parietin as a major metabolite; there are smaller amounts of fallacinal, emodin, teloschistin, and parietinic acid. The thallus and the thalline margin contain Sedifolia-grey, a pigment that give a positive reaction with two chemical spot tests: K+ (violet) and N+ (brownish red).
