= Weia =

Scientific classification
- Kingdom: Fungi
- Division: Ascomycota
- Class: Lecanoromycetes
- Order: Teloschistales
- Family: Teloschistaceae
- Genus: Weia; H.Shahidin & X.L.Wei (2025)
- Species: W. dinggyensis

Binomial name
- Weia dinggyensis H.Shahidin & X.L.Wei (2025)

Single species lichen genus

Weia is a fungal genus in the family Teloschistaceae. It comprises the single species Weia dinggyensis, a rock-dwelling lichen known from a few sites in southwestern China. The genus was proposed in 2025 based on both its external features and DNA evidence, and it is thought to be related to other yellow-orange members of the family. It typically grows on exposed rock in valley habitats at mid elevations, where conditions are warmer and more humid than the high alpine environments where some similar genera occur.

== Taxonomy ==
Weia was erected by Hursina Shahidin and Xin-Li Wei in 2025. It was established for a single species, Weia dinggyensis, and the genus name honours professor Jiangchun Wei, described by the authors as the "father of Chinese lichenology". The specific epithet dinggyensis refers to Dinggyê County in the Tibet Autonomous Region of China, where the type material was collected.

In the authors' multigene phylogeny, Weia forms a distinct lineage within Teloschistioideae. They regard it as phenotypically close to Shigatsia and Filsoniana, but separate it as a new genus based on its combination of DNA-based placement and morphology. Compared with Shigatsia, Weia has smaller apothecia that are more tightly attached to the thallus to partly immersed in the thallus, and it differs ecologically by being associated with warmer, more humid valley habitats at lower elevations (around 2,000 m) rather than the alpine steppe-to-meadow belt where Shigatsia is reported to occur.

== Description ==
Weia dinggyensis forms a small, saxicolous (rock-dwelling) thallus made up of tiny squamules; in places the thallus is thin and somewhat membranous. The thallus is reported as yellow to orange-yellow, with squamules about 0.2–0.7 mm wide. The upper surface has an alveolate cortex (a honeycomb-like cortical structure), 12–36 μm thick.

The apothecia are zeorine in form (with a thallus-derived rim beneath the proper margin) and are small and semi-immersed in the thallus, about 0.2–0.5 mm wide. The proper margin is orange and smooth, while the disc (the spore-bearing surface) is coarsely textured and yellow-brown to darker orange-brown. Internally, the hymenium is almost colourless and contains extracellular oil droplets and crystals; the hypothecium is also almost colourless. Paraphyses are simple or only rarely branched, with slightly swollen tips. The asci are Teloschistes-type and 8-spored, and the ascospores are hyaline and polarilocular (two-chambered with a connecting channel), with oil droplets; pycnidia were not observed.

Chemically, the species consistently contains parietin and methyl parietinate. Several other lichen substances are reported as common (norvicanicin, xanthorin, fragilin 9-anthrone, 7-chloroemodic acid, and an unknown compound), while haemathamnolic acid, 7-chloroemodin, and 7-chlorocitreorosein were reported less often.

== Habitat and distribution ==
Weia dinggyensis is known from a small number of collections in China. The type material was collected on rock in Dinggye County (Shigatse Municipality, Xizang (Tibet) Autonomous Region) at 2,455 m elevation, and additional specimens were reported from the Gyirong valley area of the Tibet Autonomous Region (to 2,861 m) and from Heqing County (Songgui town) in Yunnan Province (about 2,000 m).

The authors describe these localities as valley settings that fall within a transitional climatic zone between subtropical and temperate conditions, including damp, low-lying valleys with relatively high temperatures. In their discussion, they contrast this distribution with that of Shigatsia species, which they report as occurring in the alpine steppe-to-meadow belt of the Qinghai–Xizang Plateau, whereas W. dinggyensis is associated with a warmer and more humid subtropical mountain-valley belt.
