= Dijigiella =

Scientific classification
- Kingdom: Fungi
- Division: Ascomycota
- Class: Lecanoromycetes
- Order: Teloschistales
- Family: Teloschistaceae
- Genus: Dijigiella; S.Y.Kondr. & Lőkös (2017)

Type species
- Dijigiella kaernefeltiana S.Y.Kondr. (2017)

Species
- D. kaernefeltiana D. subaggregata

Genus of lichen-forming fungi

Dijigiella is a small genus of bark-dwelling lichens in the family Teloschistaceae. It currently comprises two species. The genus was established in 2017 on the basis of DNA sequence data from Australian material that formed its own evolutionary branch, although later work has suggested that Dijigiella may not represent a distinct lineage and could be better merged with the related genus Teuvoahtiana. Both known species produce small, bright yellow to orange disc-shaped fruiting bodies on tree bark, often growing in dense clusters that are more conspicuous than the thin, greyish thallus beneath them. The genus is currently known only from Australia, where it occurs on the bark of shrubs and trees in open, dry habitats.

== Taxonomy ==
Dijigiella was introduced by Sergey Kondratyuk and László Lőkös in a 2017 revision of the family that used DNA sequences from three different genes (nuclear ITS, nuclear LSU and mitochondrial SSU) to redraw relationships within the group. In those analyses Dijigiella formed its own branch within the subfamily Brownlielloideae, separate from superficially similar genera such as Marchantiana that belong to a different subfamily. The genus was circumscribed to accommodate a small, well-supported lineage informally referred to as the Dijigiella kaernefeltiana group, and currently contains two Australian species, D. kaernefeltiana and D. subaggregata, which together define its morphological and molecular concept. Both species share a similar crustose growth form and bright yellow to orange fruiting bodies, and they group together in the combined three-gene phylogeny as a distinct branch of the Brownlielloideae. The authors expect that additional species will later be placed in Dijigiella, and note that several sorediate (powdery-reproducing) crusts from Australia, for which DNA data were not yet available, may belong to this lineage once sequenced.

A later family-wide analysis of Teloschistaceae by Karina Wilk and co-workers raised problems with the original placement of Dijigiella in the newly created subfamily Brownlielloideae. They showed that Brownlielloideae had been defined using a mixed, or "chimeric", set of DNA sequences, with some of the sequences in fact belonging to quite different lichen families such as Umbilicariaceae, Acarosporaceae and members of the order Chaetothyriales. When those foreign sequences were removed and the phylogeny was recalculated using only verified Teloschistaceae data, the supposed Brownlielloideae species no longer formed a single natural group: instead they were scattered across the three established subfamilies, and the type genus Brownliella fell back into Teloschistoideae, making Brownlielloideae an artificial group and a synonym of that subfamily. In the corrected tree, the genuine sequences of Dijigiella do not form their own separate branch at all, but sit within the subfamily Xanthorioideae as part of a strongly supported Teuvoahtiana clade; on this basis Wilk and colleagues regarded Dijigiella as a putative synonym of Teuvoahtiana. Other recent studies likewise placed Dijigiella in the Xanthorioideae, where it falls in the same well-supported clade as Teuvoahtiana, in line with the view that the two generic names represent the same lineage.

== Description ==
Species of Dijigiella are crustose lichens that live on bark. The thallus is small and often inconspicuous. It may be almost entirely immersed in the outer layers of the bark (endophloedal), or form a very thin to slightly thicker crust on the surface (corticolous). It may be almost entirely immersed in the outer layers of the bark (endophloedal), or form a very thin to slightly thicker crust on the surface (corticolous). In both cases the thallus is whitish grey to grey and can be more or less continuous or broken into tiny, irregular "islands" (areoles); in the field, the genus is usually recognised by its fruiting bodies rather than by the thallus itself.

The sexual structures are apothecia, small disc-like fruiting bodies that produce spores. In Dijigiella these apothecia are relatively small (typically about 0.3–0.6 mm in diameter) and often stand slightly above the bark surface. They are usually abundant and, in D. subaggregata, can be packed into dense clusters that almost cover the thallus. The discs are yellow to yellow-orange or dull brownish yellow, and the rim can be of different construction: in some cases the rim includes tissue from the surrounding thallus (lecanorine or zeorine apothecia), while in others it consists only of the fruiting-tissue itself (biatorine apothecia). Microscopically, the apothecial margin (true exciple) is built from tightly interwoven fungal hyphae forming scleroplectenchymatous or textura intricata tissue, sometimes grading to a more regular, brick-like paraplectenchyma.

The spore-bearing layer (hymenium) contains densely branched, "broom-like" paraphyses whose tips spread out above the asci. Each ascus typically contains eight colourless (hyaline) ascospores. The spores are bipolar or polarilocular – that is, divided into two compartments by a cross-wall, with a narrow connection between the halves. In the described species they are relatively small and narrowly ellipsoid, with some variation in size between D. kaernefeltiana and D. subaggregata, but overlapping enough that spore dimensions alone do not separate the species. Chemical reactions of the apothecial pigments show the presence of anthraquinone pigments typical of many Teloschistaceae.

== Habitat and distribution ==
Dijigiella is a bark-dwelling genus. Its species grow on the bark of shrubs and trees in open, often dry situations, frequently intermixed with other brightly coloured crustose lichens in the Teloschistaceae. The type species D. kaernefeltiana was collected on dry shrubs along a roadside in Western Australia, where it occurred among thalli of other crustose lichens such as Streimanniella michelagoensis and species of Caloplaca, Buellia, Teloschistes and Candelariella. Dijigiella subaggregata was described from bark of an elm (Ulmus) in an urban setting in Camperdown, Victoria, where it formed dense patches of orange apothecia together with species of several other crustose lichen genera. In both species the thallus can be very thin and partly immersed in the bark, so the lichens often present in the field as orange crusts of crowded fruiting discs rather than as a clearly delimited grey thallus.

On current evidence the genus is endemic to Australia. Dijigiella kaernefeltiana is so far known only from its type locality in Western Australia, while D. subaggregata is known from its type collection in Victoria. The authors of the original description suggest that additional Australian crustose lichens, particularly sorediate forms that are still being sequenced, may eventually prove to belong to Dijigiella, which would broaden its known distribution and ecological range within the continent.
