= Cladonia compressa =

Scientific classification
- Domain: Eukaryota
- Kingdom: Fungi
- Division: Ascomycota
- Class: Lecanoromycetes
- Order: Lecanorales
- Family: Cladoniaceae
- Genus: Cladonia
- Species: C. compressa

Binomial name
- Cladonia compressa Ahti & Flakus (2016)

Species of lichen

Cladonia compressa is a species of lichen in the family Cladoniaceae. Found in Bolivia, it was formally described as a new species in 2016 by lichenologists Teuvo Ahti and Adam Flakus. The type specimen was collected by the second author near Siniari colony (Nor Yungas Province) at an altitude of 2,186 m (7,172 ft). Here, in a Yungas secondary cloud forest, the lichen was found growing on the ground, in humus-rich mineral soil. The specific epithet compressa refers to the compressed podetia. Secondary compounds that occur in the lichen include fumarprotocetraric acid (major), and minor to trace amounts of protocetraric acid and physodalic acid.

== See also ==
- List of Cladonia species
