= Cladonia glacialis =

Scientific classification
- Kingdom: Fungi
- Division: Ascomycota
- Class: Lecanoromycetes
- Order: Lecanorales
- Family: Cladoniaceae
- Genus: Cladonia
- Species: C. glacialis

Binomial name
- Cladonia glacialis Kristinsson & Ahti (2009)

Species of lichen

Cladonia glacialis is a rare species of fruticose lichen in the family Cladoniaceae. It is only known from a single locality by a glacier in central Iceland.

== Taxonomy ==
It was described as a new species in 2009 by Hördur Kristinsson and Teuvo Ahti. Kristinsson collected the type specimen in 1979 from Arnarfellsmúlar (a moraine in central Iceland) at an elevation of 600 m (2,000 ft). This type locality is on the southeast side of Múlajökull, which is an outlet glacier of the Hofsjökull ice cap. At the time of its original publication, Cladonia glacialis was only known to occur at the type locality.

The authors suggest that the species belongs to the "supergroup" Cladonia (as defined by Soili Stenroos and colleagues in 2002), and that it may be closely related to Cladonia phyllophora.

== Description ==
Cladonia glacialis is a lichen species characterised by its slender growth habit. The primary squamules (small, scale-like structures forming the base of the lichen) are inconspicuous but persistent, measuring 2–3 mm long and 1–2 mm wide. These squamules are flat, minimally divided, and display a distinctive colouration with glaucous grey on the upper surface and pure white underneath, featuring melanotic (blackened) bases.

The podetia (upright, stem-like structures) range in colour from deep grey to pale brown with a matt finish. They typically grow 3–4 cm tall and 0.8–1.5 mm thick, appearing slender with minimal branching. These structures can be either subulate (awl-shaped, coming to a point) or narrowly scyphose (cup-forming), with the cups measuring 0.5–2 mm in width. The melanotic darkening also appears inside the bases of the podetia.

The surface texture of C. glacialis is rough, with continuous but verruculose-knobby (warty) cortex throughout. At the base, the cortex occasionally bursts into tuberculose (bumpy) white spots. The scyphi (cups) develop granular soredia (powdery reproductive structures) in patches and often proliferate from their margins to form 3–7 subulate branchlets. Sometimes the podetia branch dichotomously (in pairs) without forming cups. The podetial squamules are scarce and small.

Apothecia (fruiting bodies) have not been observed on this species but are presumed to be brown if present. The conidiomata (asexual reproductive structures) appear terminally at podetial tips or on scyphus margins. They are broadly pyriform (pear-shaped) and sessile (attached without a stalk).

Chemically, C. glacialis tests negative with potassium hydroxide colution (K−) and positive red with p-phenylenediamine (P+ red). It contains fumarprotocetraric acid with traces of protocetraric and fumarprotocetraric acids, plus a minor unidentified compound detectable through thin-layer chromatography.

== See also ==
- List of Cladonia species
