= Cinnabaria =

Scientific classification
- Kingdom: Fungi
- Division: Ascomycota
- Class: Lecanoromycetes
- Order: Teloschistales
- Family: Teloschistaceae
- Genus: Cinnabaria; Wilk, Pabijan & Lücking (2021)
- Species: C. boliviana

Binomial name
- Cinnabaria boliviana Wilk & Lücking (2021)

Single-species fungal genus

Cinnabaria is a monospecific fungal genus in the family Teloschistaceae, represented by its sole species, Cinnabaria boliviana. This lichen, found only in Bolivia, is distinguished by its unique genetic signature, as well as morphological characteristics like ascospore size and other traits. Despite its resemblance to certain species from the Caloplaca cinnabarina species complex, Cinnabaria boliviana belongs to a distinct genetic lineage.

== Taxonomy ==
The genus Cinnabaria was circumscribed by Karina Wilk, Maciej Pabijan, and Robert Lücking, who also identified and formally described its sole species, Cinnabaria boliviana. The genus name Cinnabaria alludes to its similarity to members of the Caloplaca cinnabarina species group, as defined by Clifford Wetmore and Ingvar Kärnefelt in 1999. Despite these similarities, Cinnabaria boliviana shows a closer affinity to Group II in the phylogenetic tree, while the Caloplaca cinnabarina group aligns more with Group III. The type specimen was collected from the region of Inkarraya-Sipesipe in Quillacollo Province (Cochabamba Department, Bolivia).

== Description ==
Cinnabaria boliviana is characterised by a pale yellow-orange thallus, which is areolate and somewhat lobate at the margin. The red apothecia, contrasting sharply with the thallus, are immersed and have polarilocular ascospores of medium size and thin septa, measuring between 2.0 and 3.5 μm in thickness. This lichen exhibits notable differences from the Caloplaca cinnabarina group in the size of its thallus, apothecia, and ascospores.

== Habitat and distribution ==
Cinnabaria boliviana is currently known only from Bolivia, where it thrives in the dry Interandean Valles. It is found primarily on calcareous rocks in sunny, well-lit conditions at approximately 3,000 m (9,800 ft) above sea level.

== Similar species ==
Cinnabaria boliviana bears a striking resemblance to certain species of the Caloplaca cinnabarina group, especially Caloplaca montisfracti and Caloplaca rubelliana. Despite this, it is genetically distinct from these species, which align more closely with Group III in the phylogenetic tree. While it has a larger thallus, thicker thalline cortex, and larger apothecia and ascospores, Caloplaca rubelliana is different, possessing a grey-orange to orange, thin thallus without lobules at the margins and a grey prothallus. The Australian species Neobrownliella montisfracti also shows similarities, but differs in having a pinkish, continuous to areolate thallus that thins towards the margin, and smaller apothecia and ascospores.

Caloplaca fernandeziana is another species somewhat similar to Cinnabaria boliviana, known for its red apothecia contrasting against a yellowish thallus. However, it differs in having a thinner, usually discontinuous thallus, a distinct, black prothallus, and sessile, biatorine apothecia. Caloplaca fernandeziana is believed to be endemic to Chile.
