= Cladonia cayennensis =

Scientific classification
- Domain: Eukaryota
- Kingdom: Fungi
- Division: Ascomycota
- Class: Lecanoromycetes
- Order: Lecanorales
- Family: Cladoniaceae
- Genus: Cladonia
- Species: C. cayennensis

Binomial name
- Cladonia cayennensis Ahti & Sipman (2013)

Species of lichen

Cladonia cayennensis is a species of fruticose lichen in the family Cladoniaceae. It is found in French Guiana, although the authors suggest that its distribution might be more widespread.

== Taxonomy ==
The lichen was formally described as a new species in 2013 by the lichenologists Teuvo Ahti and Harrie Sipman. The type specimen was collected by André Aptroot from the botanical garden in Cayenne, where it was found growing on palm.

== Description ==
Cladonia cayennensis is characterised by a durable primary thallus, which is the main vegetative body of the lichen. This thallus comprises flat to slightly curved, scale-like segments known as squamules, typically measuring 1–2 mm in width. These squamules are soft and delicate, with rounded edges that are either smooth or slightly divided. The upper surface of the squamules presents a greenish-brown colour, while the underside is white, with a fluffy or cotton-like appearance. This underside is loosely covered with soredia, especially along the margins, giving it a somewhat powdery look. Soredia are vegetative propagules present as small clusters of algal cells surrounded by fungal filaments, aiding in the lichen's reproduction and spread. In some instances, these squamules have short, brownish-veined stalks at their base. As for reproductive structures, Cladonia cayennensis lacks podetia, conidiomata, and hymenial discs.

In terms of chemistry, Cladonia cayennensis contains usnic acid, albeit in low concentrations. Additionally, this species contains zeorin, which forms needle-like crystals that are particularly abundant in older herbarium specimens. The colour reactions of Cladonia cayennensis are negative for the standard lichen spot tests, indicated as P–, K–, and KC–.

== See also ==
- List of Cladonia species
