= Neobrownliella brownlieae =

Scientific classification
- Domain: Eukaryota
- Kingdom: Fungi
- Division: Ascomycota
- Class: Lecanoromycetes
- Order: Teloschistales
- Family: Teloschistaceae
- Genus: Neobrownliella
- Species: N. brownlieae

Binomial name
- Neobrownliella brownlieae (S.Y.Kondr., Elix & Kärnefelt) S.Y.Kondr., Elix, Kärnefelt & A.Thell (2015)

Synonyms
- Caloplaca brownlieae S.Y.Kondr., Elix & Kärnefelt (2011)

Species of lichen

Neobrownliella brownlieae is a species of saxicolous (rock-dwelling), crustose lichen in the family Teloschistaceae. It is widely distributed in Australia.

== Taxonomy ==
The lichen was described as new to science in 2011 by Sergey Kondratyuk, John Elix, and Ingvar Kärnefelt. It was originally placed in the large genus Caloplaca. The type specimen was collected above Lake Eucumbene, in New South Wales, where it was found growing on a granite boulder. The specific epithet brownlieae honours Australian botanist Sue Brownlie, who collected the type.

The species was transferred to the newly circumscribed genus Neobrownliella in 2015, in which it is the type species. This segregate genus of Caloplaca is characterised by a thallus that is continuous or areolate, the presence of anthraquinones as lichen products, a cortical layer with a palisade paraplectenchyma, and the lack of a thick palisade cortical layer on the underside of the thalline exciple (the ring-shaped layer of tissue surrounding the hymenium).

== Description ==
Neobrownliella brownlieae has a crustose thallus reaching a diameter of 3–5 cm (1.2–2.0 in) wide, although neighbouring colonies can coalesce to form larger spots. Its form is areolate, with the larger areoles measuring 0.3–0.8 mm wide. Its colour ranges from dull, dirty pinkish white to pinkish orange to dull brownish orange. The apothecia are tiny, measuring 0.3–0.6 mm in diameter and typically numbering 1 to 3 per areole (some may have up to 5). They are normally rounded, unless pressure from neighbouring apothecia cause them to be distorted; in rare instances, groups of apothecia grow clustered closely together to form a compound apothecial structure. Ascospores are more or less ellipsoid in shape, contain a single septum, number 8 per ascus (rarely 7) and measure 9–14 by 7–9 μm.

Several lichen products have been detected using thin-layer chromatography. These are parietin and gyrophoric acid as major metabolites, minor amounts of lecanoric acid, xanthorin, and erythroglaucin, and minor to trace amounts of ovoic acid.

== Habitat and distribution ==
Neobrownliella brownlieae has been recorded from Western Australia, Northern Territory, Queensland, Australian Capital Territory, New South Wales, and South Australia, where it grows on siliceous rock.
