= Aspergillus caperatus =

Scientific classification
- Kingdom: Fungi
- Division: Ascomycota
- Class: Eurotiomycetes
- Order: Eurotiales
- Family: Aspergillaceae
- Genus: Aspergillus
- Species: A. caperatus

Binomial name
- Aspergillus caperatus A.J. Chen, Frisvad & Samson (2017)

Species of fungus

Aspergillus caperatus is a species of fungus in the genus Aspergillus. It is from the Aspergillus section. The species was first described in 2017. It has been isolated from soil in South Africa. It has been reported to produce auroglaucin, a bisanthron, dihydroauroglaucin, echinulins, epiheveadrides, flavoglaucin, isoechinulins, neoechinulins, physcion, and tetrahydroauroglaucin.

== Growth and morphology ==
A. caperatus has been cultivated on both Czapek yeast extract agar (CYA) plates and yeast extract sucrose agar (YES) plates. The growth morphology of the colonies can be seen in the pictures below.

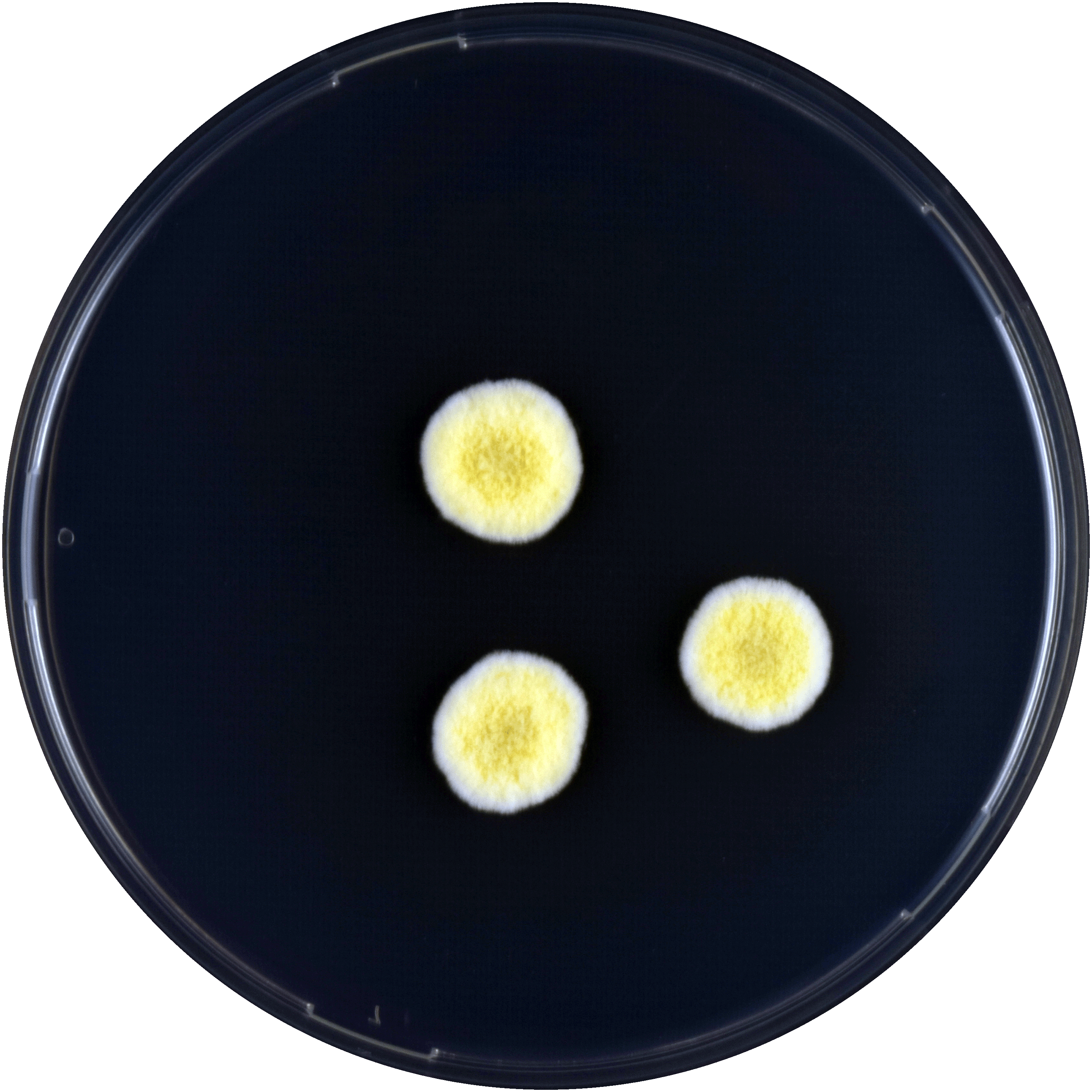
Aspergillus caperatus growing on CYA plate

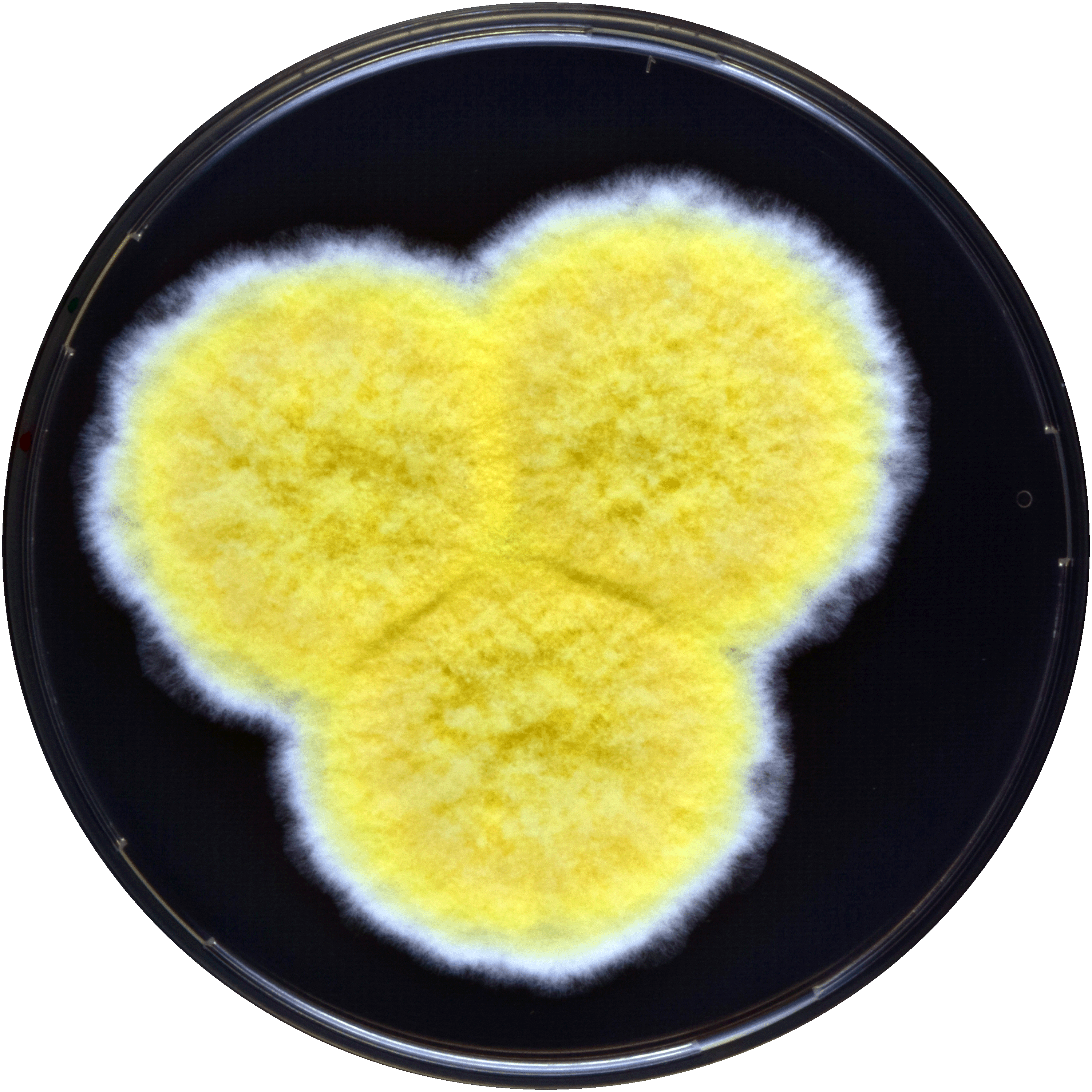
Aspergillus caperatus growing on YES plate
