= Brownliella =

Scientific classification
- Domain: Eukaryota
- Kingdom: Fungi
- Division: Ascomycota
- Class: Lecanoromycetes
- Order: Teloschistales
- Family: Teloschistaceae
- Genus: Brownliella; S.Y.Kondr., Kärnefelt, Elix, A.Thell & Hur (2013)

Type species
- Brownliella aequata (Hue) S.Y.Kondr., Kärnefelt, Elix, A.Thell & Hur (2013)

Species
- B. aequata B. kobeana

Genus of lichens

Brownliella is a genus of crustose lichens in the subfamily Teloschistoideae of the family Teloschistaceae. It has two species. The genus was established in 2013 and is named after the Australian botanist Sue Brownlie. These lichens are characterised by their flat, crusty growth and colours ranging from dull pink to vivid orange, caused by natural pigments.

== Taxonomy ==
The genus was circumscribed in 2013 by Sergey Kondratyuk, Ingvar Kärnefelt, John Elix, Arne Thell, and Jae-Seoun Hur, with the widely distributed lichen Brownliella aequata assigned as the type species. The genus was proposed for species formerly referred to as the Caloplaca cinnabarina species group. The generic name honours the Australian botanist Sue Brownlie, who assisted the authors with their collections.

== Description ==
The thallus of Brownliella lichens form a flat crust that may remain smooth and continuous or fracture into tiny, discrete areoles; towards the edge it can partly lift to give a faintly lobed appearance. Its colours span dull pink and brownish-pink through to vivid orange or reddish-orange, a palette produced by anthraquinone pigments. A thin outer skin (cortex) is built from densely interwoven, upright fungal cells—technically a palisade paraplectenchyma—that protects the algal layer beneath. At maturity both thallus and fruit bodies turn purple when touched with a potassium hydroxide reagent (K+ purple), a field spot test that signals the presence of parietin and related compounds; some species also accumulate gyrophoric, ovoic or lecanoric acids, plus minor traces of xanthorin and erythroglaucin.

Sexual reproduction is through tiny, pale orange apothecia (fruiting bodies) that are immersed to slightly sunken in the crust and belong to the biatorine type, meaning they lack the thick algal rim seen in many relatives. Their margin is so thin that under the microscope the true exciple—an inner ring of fungal tissue—appears little more than a membrane. Each club-shaped (clavate) ascus is of the Lecanora-type and normally holds eight ascospores, though two to four may remain rudimentary; the mature spores are ellipsoidal, divided into two unequal chambers by a central wall (they are polarilocular), and relatively small compared with those of allied genera. Scattered among the crust lie minute pycnidia—flask-shaped cavities that release slender, rod-shaped conidia; these asexual spores can regenerate the fungal partner but must re-associate with a compatible micro-alga before a new thallus develops.

== Species ==
As of July 2025, Species Fungorum (in the Catalogue of Life) includes two species in genus Brownliella:

- Brownliella aequata (Zahlbr.) S.Y.Kondr., Kärnefelt, Elix, A.Thell & Hur (2013)
- Brownliella kobeana (Nyl.) S.Y.Kondr., Kärnefelt, A.Thell, Elix, Jung Kim, A.S.Kondr. & Hur (2015)

Two species formerly placed in this genus, Brownliella montisfracti and Brownliella cinnabarina, have since been transferred to Neobrownliella.
