= Cladonia islandica =

Scientific classification
- Domain: Eukaryota
- Kingdom: Fungi
- Division: Ascomycota
- Class: Lecanoromycetes
- Order: Lecanorales
- Family: Cladoniaceae
- Genus: Cladonia
- Species: C. islandica

Binomial name
- Cladonia islandica Kristinsson & Ahti (2009)

Species of lichen

Cladonia islandica is a species of fruticose lichen in the family Cladoniaceae. It is endemic to Iceland, where it grows on moss-covered rocks and stone walls. The lichen was described as a new species in 2009 by Hördur Kristinsson and Teuvo Ahti. The type specimen was collected by Kristinsson from Herdisarvik, Árnessýsla (Southern Region) in 1978. It has been collected from various locations around Iceland, but is most common around the lake Mývatn.

== Description ==
Cladonia islandica is a lichen species with both primary and secondary growth forms. The primary thallus squamules (small, scale-like structures) are persistent, somewhat thick, ranging from convex to flat in shape, and measure 0.2–1.0 mm in length. These squamules show minimal division and appear dark brown and shiny on the upper surface, with a distinctive blackening at the base. The underside displays a floccose (woolly or fluffy) texture interspersed with patches of cortex (outer protective layer).

The podetia (vertical stalks) are dark brown, taking on a greyish hue in shaded conditions, and have a somewhat shiny surface. The base of these structures shows strong melanisation (darkening). These podetia typically stand 3–7 cm tall with a diameter of 0.1–0.5 mm, appearing relatively slender. They may be unbranched or show irregular branching in their upper portions, with some branchlets being long and either curved or spreading at wide angles, culminating in pointed tips. The podetia generally lacking cup-like structures (they are ascyphose), though narrow cups occasionally form. The axils (branch junctions) are initially closed but may develop perforations as they age.

The surface texture of the podetia is rough, lacking soredia (reproductive structures) but with microsquamules and coarse granules. The cortex is discontinuous even in young specimens, relatively thick, and transforms into small, bullate (bubble-like) squamules. The medulla (inner layer) is thick but not particularly hard, while the surface of the central canal appears finely papillate (covered with small protuberances). Some larger squamules may be present near the base.

Reproductive structures include infrequent apothecia (disc-shaped fruiting bodies) positioned at the tips of the podetia. These are small, flat, and blackish-brown in colour, though only immature specimens have been observed. Spores have not been documented. The conidiomata (asexual reproductive structures) are relatively sparse, appearing either at the tips or bases of the podetia, broadly pyriform (pear-shaped) to cylindrical, black, and sessile (lacking stalks). Conidia (asexual spores) have not been observed.

Chemical spot test analysis shows that Cladonia islandica is K−, and P+ (red). It contains fumarprotocetraric acid as its main secondary metabolite, with traces of protocetraric and confumarprotocetraric acids, as confirmed through thin-layer chromatography.

== See also ==
- List of Cladonia species
