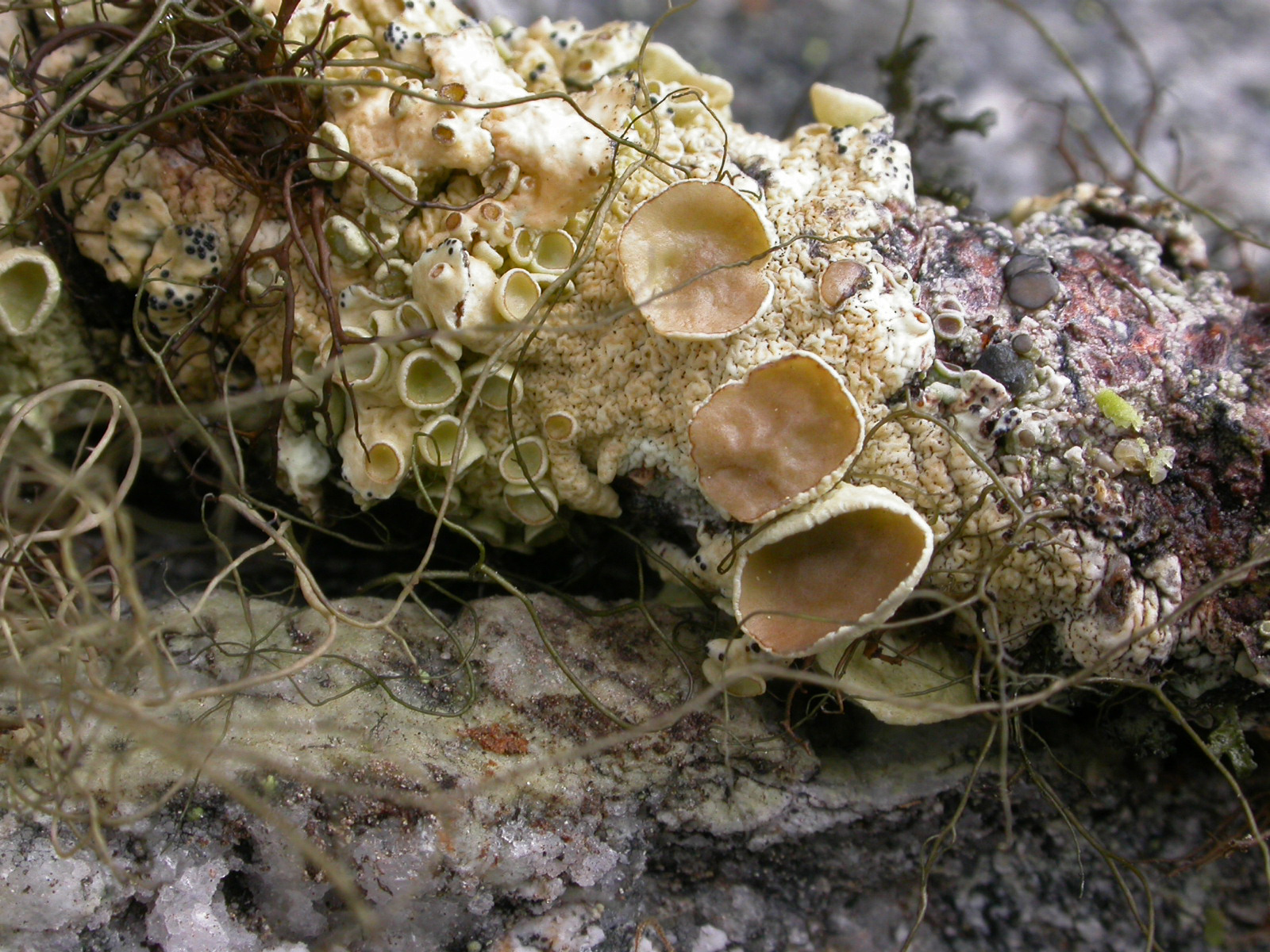
- Ahtiana sphaerosporella growing on whitebark pine (Pinus albicaulis) in Whistler, British Columbia, Canada

Conservation status
- Secure (NatureServe)

Scientific classification
- Domain: Eukaryota
- Kingdom: Fungi
- Division: Ascomycota
- Class: Lecanoromycetes
- Order: Lecanorales
- Family: Parmeliaceae
- Genus: Ahtiana; Goward (1986)
- Species: A. sphaerosporella

Binomial name
- Ahtiana sphaerosporella (Müll.Arg.) Goward (1986)

Synonyms
- Parmelia sphaerosporella Müll.Arg. (1891); Nephromopsis sphaerosporella (Müll.Arg.) Divakar, A.Crespo & Lumbsch (2017)

= Ahtiana =

Single-species genus of lichen

Ahtiana is a fungal genus in the family Parmeliaceae. A monotypic genus, it contains the single species Ahtiana sphaerosporella, the mountain candlewax lichen, found in western North America. The species was originally classified as Parmelia sphaerosporella by Johannes Müller Argoviensis in 1891, before Trevor Goward established the new genus Ahtiana in 1985, naming it after Finnish lichenologist Teuvo Ahti. This foliose lichen is characterised by its pale yellowish-green thallus, spherical spores, laminal apothecia (fruiting bodies), and the presence of usnic and caperatic acids. It primarily grows on the bark of whitebark pine in subalpine and montane regions, though it occasionally colonises other conifers outside its preferred host's range.

== Taxonomy ==
The genus Ahtiana was established in 1985 by Trevor Goward to accommodate the species Ahtiana sphaerosporella, previously classified as Parmelia sphaerosporella by Johannes Müller Argoviensis in 1891. Goward's reclassification was prompted by notable morphological and chemical differences between A. sphaerosporella and other members of the genus Parmelia. The name Ahtiana honours the Finnish lichenologist Teuvo Ahti, renowned for his contributions to the study of western North American lichens.

Historically, Parmelia sphaerosporella was considered part of the broad genus Parmelia, which has since been divided into numerous smaller genera. While some earlier taxonomic studies emphasized its similarity to Parmelia sect. Cyclocheila (now Pseudoparmelia), subsequent analyses highlighted fundamental distinctions, such as its spore shape, cortical structure, and secondary chemistry. These features, particularly its spherical spores and production of caperatic acid, indicated a closer relationship with cetrarioid lichens than with the parmelioid group.

Despite sharing some superficial traits with other cetrarioid genera, such as Nephromopsis, Ahtiana differs in its closely appressed foliose thallus, laminal apothecia, and emergent pycnidia. These distinctive characteristics, coupled with its unique chemical profile, justify its placement in a separate monotypic genus within the family Parmeliaceae.

In 2017, Pradeep Divakar and colleagues applied a recently developed "temporal phylogenetic" method to define time-based thresholds for taxonomic ranks within the family Parmeliaceae. According to their analysis, groups of species that diverged between 29.45 and 32.55 million years ago were proposed to represent genera. As part of their findings, they suggested synonymizing Arctocetraria with Nephromopsis, along with several other Parmelioid genera, to ensure that all genera within the family were of similar evolutionary age. While some of their proposed taxonomic revisions gained acceptance, a subsequent critical review of the temporal phylogenetic approach for fungal classification rejected the synonymisation of the Parmelioid genera with Nephromopsis.

It had been suggested that the genus include A. aurescens (Eastern candlewax lichen, formerly Cetraria aurescens Tuck.) and A. pallidula (pallid candlewax lichen, formerly Cetraria pallidula Tuck.) based on similarities in morphology, but this transfer is not supported by molecular analysis.

== Description ==
The genus Ahtiana includes foliose lichens, meaning they have a leaf-like structure that closely adheres to their substrate. The thallus, or main body, is pale yellowish-green, occasionally darkening to an olivaceous hue, and often has a wrinkled or folded surface texture. The undersides are typically pale tan to olive and feature sparse to abundant rhizines—root-like structures that help the lichen anchor to its substrate. A key distinguishing feature of Ahtiana is the absence of pseudocyphellae, which are small pores or breaks in the surface commonly seen in related genera. Instead, the upper cortex (the lichen's outer layer) is smooth and composed of a thin, specialised tissue type known as a leptodermatous cortex.

The reproductive structures are prominently laminal, meaning they occur all over the thallus surface, rather than in the centre or on the margins. Apothecia, the fruiting bodies that produce spores, are frequently found near the centre of the lichen and have an entire, unbroken disc. The spores are spherical, simple (non-segmented), and measure 4–6 μm in diameter. Pycnidia, small flask-shaped structures producing asexual spores, are also laminal, often abundant, and conspicuous due to their dark colouration. Ahtiana produces characteristic chemical compounds, including usnic acid, which contributes to its yellowish colour, and caperatic acid, an aliphatic acid identified through thin-layer chromatography.

== Habitat, distribution, and ecology ==
Ahtiana sphaerosporella is exclusively found in western North America, where it inhabits subalpine and montane regions. It has a strong ecological preference for the bark of Pinus albicaulis (whitebark pine), often forming abundant colonies on this tree. However, it is absent from nearby trees of other species in its typical range. In certain areas outside the range of Pinus albicaulis, such as the Northwest Territories, it has been observed on other conifers, including Abies lasiocarpa (subalpine fir). The distribution of the lichen closely parallels that of its preferred host tree P. albicaulis, which is typically found at high elevations and, in some cases, in lower montane stands. In southern parts of its range, the lichen has been documented colonising other species of pine and spruce, showinfg some adaptability to alternative hosts when necessary. Reports of the lichen from outside western North America, such as a record from Emo, Ontario, were later identified as misidentifications.
