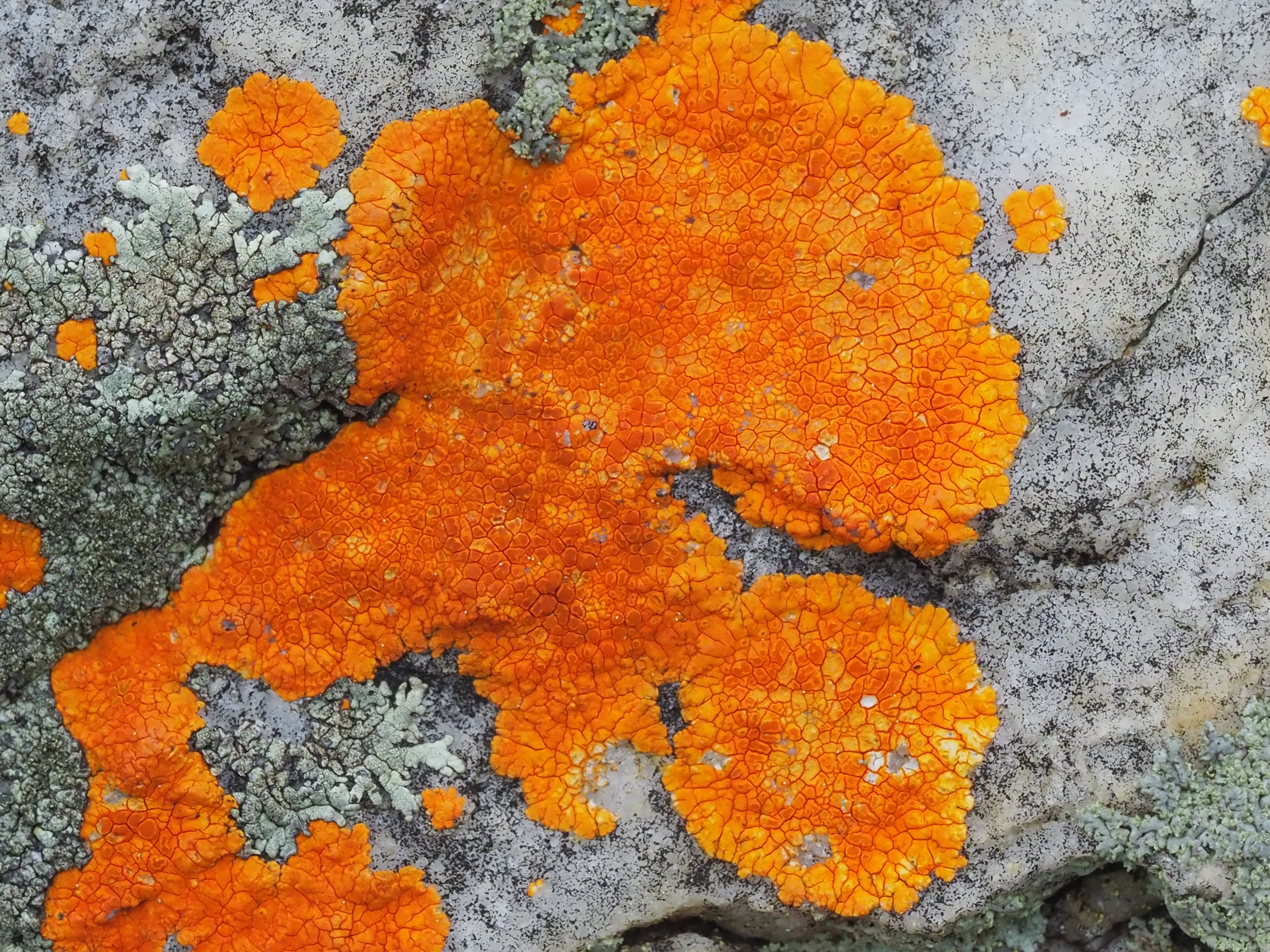
- Neobrownliella cinnabarina

Scientific classification
- Domain: Eukaryota
- Kingdom: Fungi
- Division: Ascomycota
- Class: Lecanoromycetes
- Order: Teloschistales
- Family: Teloschistaceae
- Genus: Neobrownliella; S.Y.Kondr., Elix, Kärnefelt & A.Thell (2015)

Type species
- Neobrownliella brownlieae (S.Y.Kondr., Elix & Kärnefelt) S.Y.Kondr., Elix, Kärnefelt & A.Thell (2015)

Species
- N. brownlieae N. cinnabarina N. holochracea N. montisfracti N. salyangensis

= Neobrownliella =

Genus of lichens

Neobrownliella is a genus of five crust-forming lichens in the family Teloschistaceae. Its pink- to orange-red crusts may stay smooth or break into tiny plates (areolate), contain parietin and other anthraquinone pigments, and have a protective outer cortex of upright fungal cells (a palisade paraplectenchyma); unlike many close relatives, the thin rim that rings each spore disc lacks an extra palisade layer.

== Taxonomy ==
The genus was circumscribed in 2015 by lichenologists Sergey Kondratyuk, Jack Elix, Ingvar Kärnefelt, and Arne Thell, with Neobrownliella brownlieae assigned as the type species. It is a segregate of the large genus Caloplaca, and is classified in the subfamily Teloschistoideae of the family Teloschistaceae. Two species were included in the original circumscription of the genus; an additional three species were added in 2020.

== Description ==
The thallus of Neobrownliella forms a crust that begins as an unbroken film but often fractures into discrete areoles; at the margins these can lift slightly so the rim looks faintly lobed. Colours range from muted pink and brown-pink to bright orange or reddish-orange, a palette produced by anthraquinone pigments of the parietin group. A thin outer cortex is built from densely interwoven upright hyphae (a palisade paraplectenchyma) that shields the algal layer beneath. Both the thallus and the fruit bodies turn a deep purple when a drop of potassium hydroxide solution is applied, a quick field test that confirms the presence of parietin and related lichen products; some species also contain gyrophoric, ovoic or lecanoric acids together with traces of xanthorin and erythroglaucin.

Sexual structures are minute, pale-orange apothecia set flush with or slightly sunken in the crust. They are biatorine, lacking the thick algal rim seen in many teloschistoid relatives, and their internal ring of fungal tissue (the true exciple) is reduced to a delicate membrane. Inside each club-shaped ascus up to eight ascospores are produced, although two to six usually mature fully; the spores are relatively small and divided into two unequal chambers by a central wall (they are polarilocular). Asexual reproduction occurs in microscopic flask-shaped pycnidia embedded in the thallus, which release slender, rod-shaped conidia.

== Species ==
As of July 2025, Species Fungorum (in the Catalogue of Life) accept five species of Neobrownliella:

- Neobrownliella brownlieae (S.Y.Kondr., Elix & Kärnefelt) S.Y.Kondr., Elix, Kärnefelt & A.Thell (2015) – Australia
- Neobrownliella cinnabarina (Ach.) S.Y.Kondr., Upreti & A.Thell (2020)
- Neobrownliella holochracea (Nyl.) S.Y.Kondr., Upreti & A.Thell (2020)
- Neobrownliella montisfracti (S.Y.Kondr. & Kärnefelt) S.Y. Kondr., Elix, Kärnefelt & A. Thell (2015) – Australia
- Neobrownliella salyangensis S.Y.Kondr. & Hur (2020) – South Korea
