= Filsoniana fabricola =

Scientific classification
- Kingdom: Fungi
- Division: Ascomycota
- Class: Lecanoromycetes
- Order: Teloschistales
- Family: Teloschistaceae
- Genus: Filsoniana
- Species: F. fabricola

Binomial name
- Filsoniana fabricola H.Shahidin & X.L.Wei (2025)

Species of lichen-forming fungus

Filsoniana fabricola is a species of lichen-forming fungus in the family Teloschistaceae. Found in China, it was formally described as a new species in 2025. The type was collected in De-ching town (Lhasa, Tibet Autonomous Region), where it was found growing on the surface of old worn-out clothes found at the field ridge in the mountains. The species epithet, fabricola, refers to its unusual substrate.
