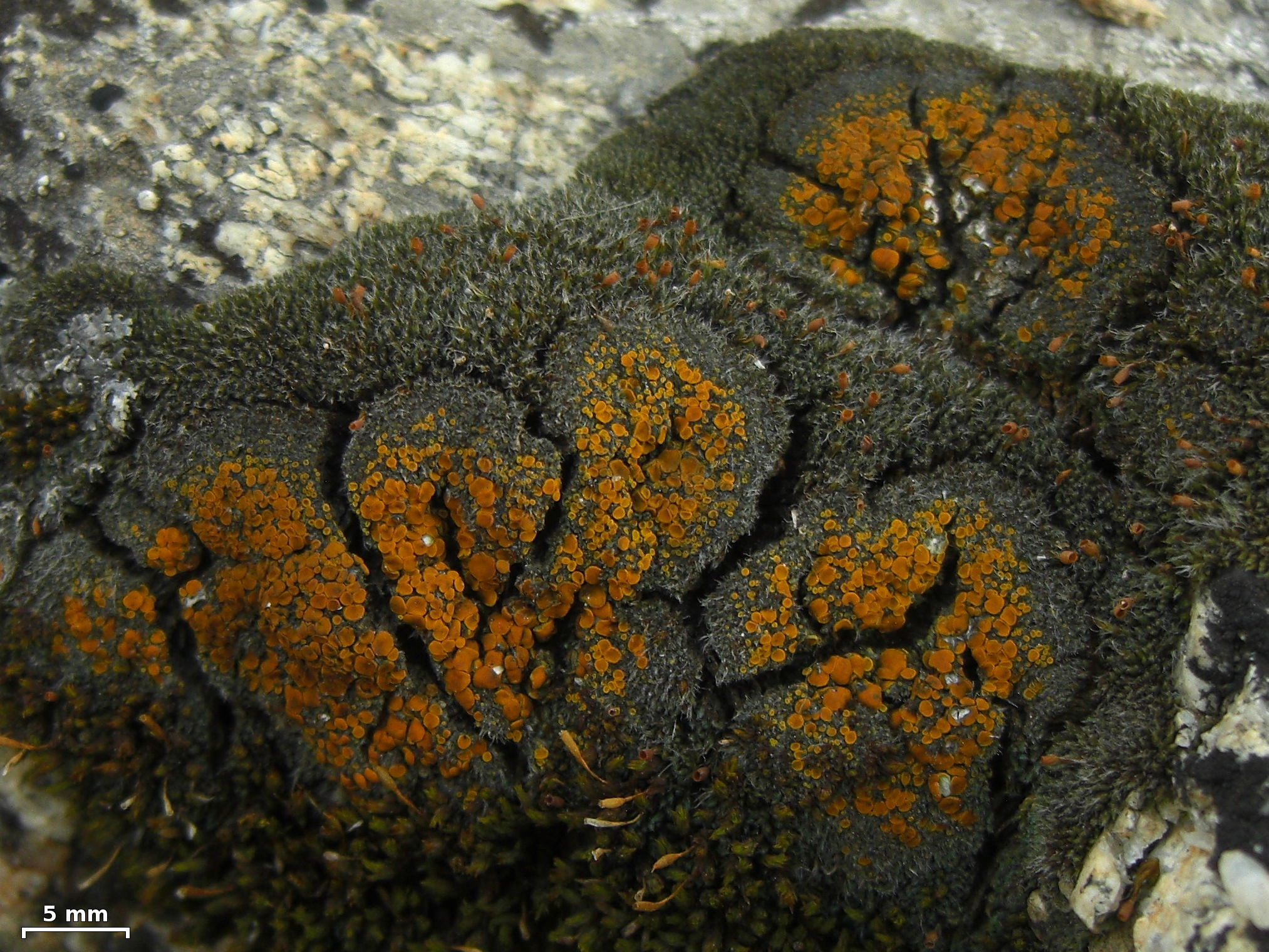
- Caloplaca tiroliensis

Scientific classification
- Domain: Eukaryota
- Kingdom: Fungi
- Division: Ascomycota
- Class: Lecanoromycetes
- Order: Teloschistales
- Family: Teloschistaceae
- Genus: Parvoplaca; Arup, Søchting & Frödén (2013)

Type species
- Parvoplaca tiroliensis (Zahlbr.) Arup, Søchting & Frödén (2013)

Species
- see text

= Parvoplaca =

Genus of lichen

Parvoplaca is a genus of lichen-forming fungi in the family Teloschistaceae. The genus was circumscribed in 2013 by Ulrik Søchting, Patrik Frödén, and Ulf Arup.

== Species ==
- Parvoplaca athallina (Darb.) Arup, Søchting & Frödén (2013)
- Parvoplaca candanii Halıcı & Søchting (2023) – Antarctica
- Parvoplaca chelyae (Pérez-Vargas) Vondrák, Halıcı & Arup (2015)
- Parvoplaca lamprocarpa Arup & Søchting (2023) – Alaska
- Parvoplaca macroborealis Arup & Søchting (2023) – Oregon, USA
- Parvoplaca nigroblastidiata Arup, Halıcı & Vondrák (2015) – Europe; Alaska
- Parvoplaca servitiana (Szatala) Arup, Søchting & Frödén (2013)
- Parvoplaca suspiciosa (Nyl.) Arup, Søchting & Frödén (2013)
- Parvoplaca tenebrosa Arup & Søchting (2023) – Oregon, USA
- Parvoplaca tiroliensis (Zahlbr.) Arup, Søchting & Frödén (2013)

== Description ==
Parvoplaca is a genus of crustose lichens with small, usually yellow or blackened apothecia. The spores are polar-diblastic with a septum. No pycnidia are seen.

== Distribution and habitat ==
Parvoplaca is mainly distributed in polar regions but also in the boreal zone and the Mediterranean.

Species of Parvoplaca generally grow on moss or detritus but are also found growing on bark.
