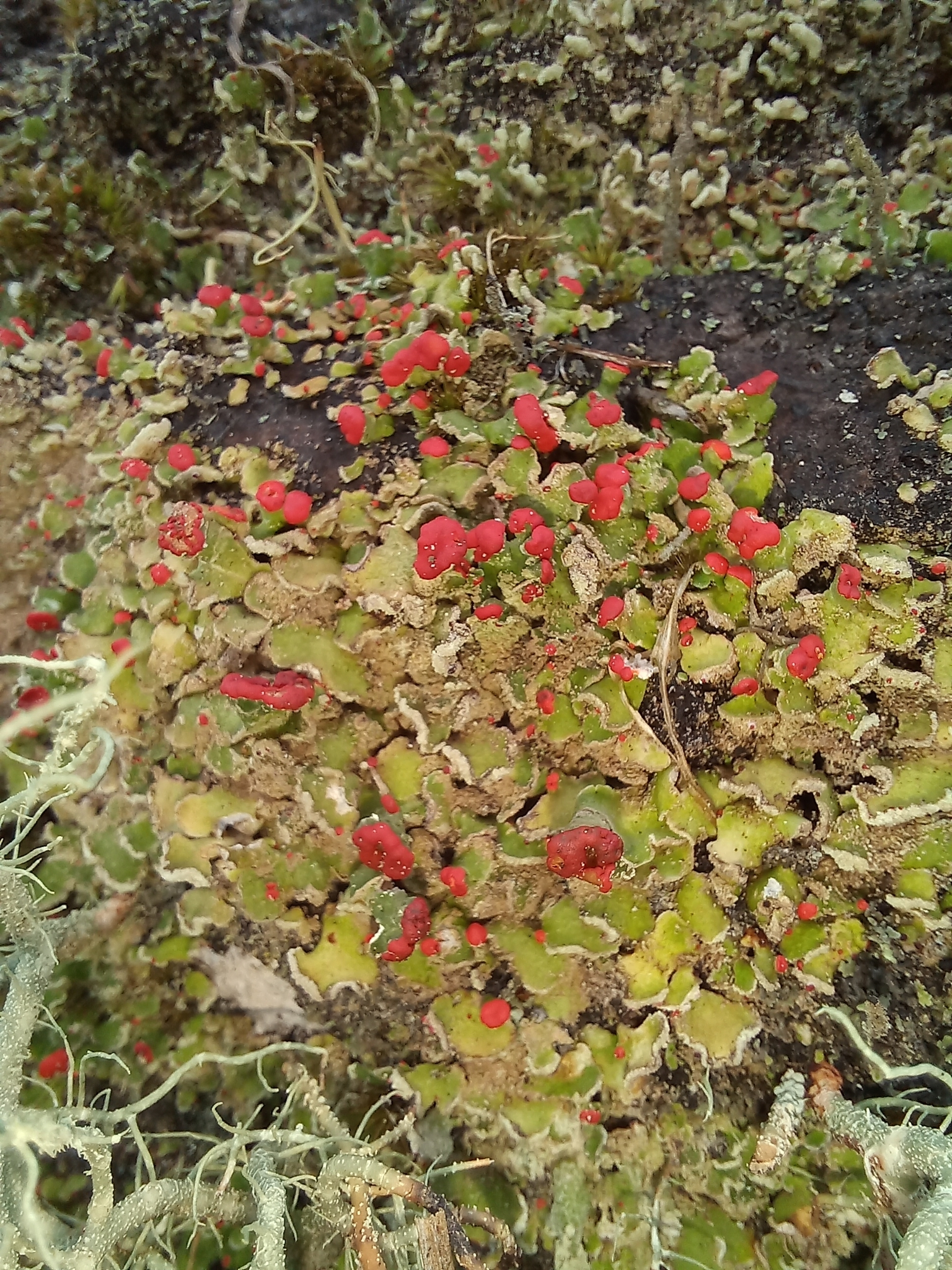

Scientific classification
- Kingdom: Fungi
- Division: Ascomycota
- Class: Lecanoromycetes
- Order: Lecanorales
- Family: Cladoniaceae
- Genus: Cladonia
- Species: C. ahtii

Binomial name
- Cladonia ahtii S.Stenroos (1989)

= Cladonia ahtii =

Species of lichen-forming fungus

Cladonia ahtii is a species of cup lichen in the family Cladoniaceae. It is found in Brazil, and grows in tropical moist broadleaf forests. The specific epithet honours Finnish lichenologist Teuvo Ahti.
