= Teuvoahtiana =

Scientific classification
- Domain: Eukaryota
- Kingdom: Fungi
- Division: Ascomycota
- Class: Lecanoromycetes
- Order: Teloschistales
- Family: Teloschistaceae
- Genus: Teuvoahtiana; S.Y.Kondr. & Hur (2017)

Type species
- Teuvoahtiana rugulosa (Nyl.) S.Y.Kondr. & Hur (2017)

Genus of lichens

Teuvoahtiana is a genus of lichen-forming fungi in the family Teloschistaceae. It contains three species of saxicolous (rock-dwelling), crustose lichens, all of which occur in South America.

== Taxonomy ==
Teuvoahtiana was circumscribed in 2017 by lichenologists Sergey Kondratyuk and Jae-Seoun Hur, with Teuvoahtiana rugulosa assigned as the type species. This species was first formally described as Placodium rugolosum by William Nylander in 1855. The genus name honours Finnish lichenologist Teuvo Ahti, "in recognition of his contribution to lichenology and especially to development of lichenological investigation in the South American continent".

== Description ==
Teuvoahtiana has members that are crustose, areolate, and squamulose–an unusually diverse range of forms for a single monophyletic branch of the Teloschistaceae. In some cases, the peripheral zone of the thallus has unique areoles that are elongated to form distinct lobes. This genus is noted for the pronounced thickness of the areolae and lobes. Their colour ranges from a luminescent yellow-orange to a more muted yellowish-brown or dull orange-brown. When numerous apothecia are present, the thallus can take on a less common reddish-orange-brown shade. Structurally, the cortical layer transitions between a paraplectenchymatous to a mesodermatous paraplectenchymatous state.

The apothecia of Teuvoahtiana vary from medium to large size, often congregating in dense clusters. They have a lecanorine to zeorine structure, with a flat disc that displays a spectrum of colours from soft yellow to a more vibrant pinkish orange-brown. The true exciple, or outer layer, is characterised by a complex interwoven structure, known as "textura intricata". The asci, the reproductive sacs in which spores are formed, hold a variable count of one to eight spores. These ascospores are polarilocular (divided into two compartments by a thick septum with a perforation).

Teuvoahtiana is similar to the Australian genus Filsoniana, but unlike that genus, is in the subfamily Xanthorioideae rather than subfamily Teloschistoideae. Close relatives of Teuvoahtiana include the genera Xanthopeltis and Austroplaca.

== Species ==
- Teuvoahtiana altoandina (Malme) S.Y.Kondr. & Hur (2017)
- Teuvoahtiana fernandeziana (Zahlbr.) S.Y.Kondr. & Hur (2017)
- Teuvoahtiana rugulosa (Nyl.) S.Y.Kondr. & Hur (2017)

The new species Teuvoahtiana meridionalis was recently (2023) described from Antarctica and Southern South America.
