= Filsoniana kiamae =

Scientific classification
- Kingdom: Fungi
- Division: Ascomycota
- Class: Lecanoromycetes
- Order: Teloschistales
- Family: Teloschistaceae
- Genus: Filsoniana
- Species: F. kiamae

Binomial name
- Filsoniana kiamae (S.Y.Kondr. & Kärnefelt) S.Y.Kondr., Kärnefelt, Elix, A.Thell & Hur (2013)
- Holotype: Kiama township, New South Wales

Synonyms
- Caloplaca kiamae S.Y.Kondr. & Kärnefelt (2007); Squamulea kiamae (S.Y.Kondr. & Kärnefelt) Arup, Søchting & Frödén (2013)

Species of lichen

Filsoniana kiamae is a species of saxicolous (rock-dwelling), crustose lichen in the family Teloschistaceae. It is found in Australia. The lichen forms small rosettes with brownish-orange areoles, and it occasionally develops isidia. Its rare apothecia (fruiting bodies) are round, with brownish-orange margins and a reddish disc.

== Taxonomy ==
The lichen was formally described as a new species in 2007 by the lichenologists Sergey Kondratyuk and Ingvar Kärnefelt. The species epithet refers to Kiama township, its type locality. The type specimen was collected by the first author on rock outcrops along the coast. Initially classified in the genus Caloplaca, it has been proposed for inclusion in the genus Squamulea in 2013, and later transferred by Kondratyuk and colleagues to Filsoniana in 2013.

== Description ==
Filsoniana kiamae typically forms rosettes ranging in size from 3 to 15 mm in diameter. The thallus is often discernible, especially in the peripheral zone, which is usually about 2–3 mm wide and has a brownish-orange hue. The areoles or squamules of this species measure 0.7–1.8 mm in length, 0.5–1.2 mm in width, and are 0.3–0.4 mm thick, occasionally reaching up to 1 mm. Terminal portions of these areoles can be dissected into smaller sections, measuring 0.2–0.5 mm in width and up to 0.7 mm in length, with lateral dissected portions typically overlapping and measuring 0.3–0.4 mm in width. These areoles are flat to somewhat convex and tightly adhered to the substrate, with their upper surface having a brownish-orange to greenish-brownish orange colour.

In cross-section, the thallus of Filsoniana kiamae is about 150–350 μm thick. It has a paraplectenchymatous cortex approximately 20–30 μm thick, with cells measuring 4–9 μm in width. The algal layer can be up to 200 μm thick but is not continuous. The blastidious mass, slightly brighter in colour, ranges from yellow to dull yellow. Blastidia are typically about 25–30 μm in diameter, originating from the underside along laterally dissected portions and sometimes on terminal portions, occasionally evolving into isidia up to 100 μm in diameter. In larger rosettes, the blastidious mass is confined to the central part, with a peripheral zone of 1–2 mm typically lacking blastidia.

The apothecia of Filsoniana kiamae are relatively rare, measuring 0.3–0.7 mm in diameter. They are sessile, round, flat, and can be either lecanorine or zeorine in type, with brownish-orange thalline and proper margins, and a reddish to reddish-brown disc. The thalline margin is approximately 80 μm thick, while the proper exciple is 70–100 μm thick at its uppermost lateral portion, reducing to 15–20 μm in the lower lateral and basal portions. The exciple is scleroplectenchymatous with a matrix and cell lumina of 1–1.5 μm in diameter. The hymenium is 75–80 μm high, and the subhymenium, which can contain oil droplets up to 3 μm in diameter, is about 50 μm thick. Paraphyses are slightly expanded towards their tips, reaching up to 7 μm in diameter, often containing oil droplets in the upper cells. The spores of Filsoniana kiamae are characteristically wide with slightly expanded septa, measuring 10–16 by 6–8 μm, with a septum of 1–4 μm.

Chemically, the thallus and apothecia are K+ (red), C−, and I−. The species contains parietin as its major lichen product, along with minor amounts of fallacinal, traces of parietinic acid, and teloschistin.

== Habitat and distribution ==
Filsoniana kiamae is typically found in natural indentations and fissures of granite rock outcrops, as well as on sandy limestone surfaces. The species is known to inhabit various regions across southern Australia. Its presence has been recorded in a number of dispersed locations, including Western Australia, South Australia, and New South Wales.
