= Neobrownliella montisfracti =

Scientific classification
- Kingdom: Fungi
- Division: Ascomycota
- Class: Lecanoromycetes
- Order: Teloschistales
- Family: Teloschistaceae
- Genus: Neobrownliella
- Species: N. montisfracti

Binomial name
- Neobrownliella montisfracti (S.Y.Kondr. & Kärnefelt) S.Y.Kondr., Elix, Kärnefelt & A.Thell (2015)
- Holotype: north of Northampton, Western Australia

Synonyms
- Caloplaca montisfracti S.Y.Kondr. & Kärnefelt (2007); Brownliella montisfracti (S.Y.Kondr. & Kärnefelt) S.Y.Kondr., Kärnefelt, Elix, A.Thell & Hur (2013)

Species of lichen

Neobrownliella montisfracti is a species of saxicolous (rock-dwelling), crustose lichen in the family Teloschistaceae. It is found in Australia. The small lichen has dull pink to grey areoles, characterised by completely immersed, reddish to pink-brown apothecia (fruiting bodies) and lacking soredia and isidia. Its areoles are closely pressed against the substrate, with the apothecia containing small, elongated ascospores and narrowly rod-shaped conidia.

== Taxonomy ==
The lichen was formally described as a new species in 2007 by the lichenologists Sergey Kondratyuk and Ingvar Kärnefelt. The epithet of the species, montisfracti, alludes to its frequent presence near Broken Hill (montis meaning "hill" and fractus meaning "broken" in Latin). The type specimen was collected in 2004 north of Northampton on the road to Port Gregory, where it was found growing on sandstone–ironstone rocks. The taxon was transferred to the newly proposed genus Neobrownliella in 2015.

== Description ==
Neobrownliella montisfracti presents as small, rounded spots, typically 5–10 mm wide. The thallus is crustose, ranging from continuous to areolate and thinning considerably towards the periphery. Its colour varies from dull pink to grey, occasionally tinged with rose, or indistinctly coloured. This species is characterised by its completely immersed apothecia (fruiting bodies), which are bright reddish, pink-brown, or reddish-pink in colour, and the lack of soredia and isidia.

The areoles in the central part of the thallus are about 0.3–0.7 mm wide, expanding slightly to 0.4–1.0 mm in the peripheral zone. They are often radially oriented, yet remain closely pressed against the substrate and become thinner towards the edges. The upper surface of the areoles is generally dull pink to brownish-orange, sometimes showing patches of whitish pruina or appearing greyish in some areas. In cross-section, the areoles can be up to 200–250 μm thick, with a necrotic layer up to 10–15 μm and a cortex about 15–20 μm thick, made of palisade paraplectenchymatous tissue.

The apothecia, measuring 0.2–0.3 (sometimes up to 0.7) mm in diameter, are found in the central portion or throughout the thallus. They are entirely immersed in the areoles and occasionally slightly rise above the level of the areole. Typically, there are 1–2 apothecia per areole, although sometimes more (up to 4–5). The proper margin of the apothecia is usually not visible, but when apparent, it is about 50 μm thick, hyaline (translucent) or somewhat rose. The discs of the apothecia are initially slightly concave, soon becoming flat and are rose or dull reddish-brown in colour, turning yellowish-orange when overmature. The true exciple in cross-section is about 30 μm thick at the uppermost lateral portion, reducing to about 10 μm in the middle lateral portion and 15–20 μm at the basal portion. The hymenium stands 60–70 μm high, with a subhymenium 15–20 μm thick. The paraphyses are well branched in the upper portion, almost not widening towards the tips, measuring about 2–3 μm in diameter. Asci typically contain eight ascospores, which are small and elongated to almost spherical, with a wide septum measuring 7–12 by 5–6.5 μm and a septum thickness of 2.5–3.5 μm. Conidia are narrowly bacilliform, measuring 4 by 1–1.1 μm.

== Habitat and distribution ==
Neobrownliella montisfracti grows predominantly on a variety of siliceous substrates such as quartzite, schist, granite, and sandstone rocks. It is occasionally found on calcareous and man-made substrates like asphalt. This species often coexists with other members of the Caloplaca genus (in the broad sense), such as Filsoniana australiensis and Nevilleiella cfr. lateritia.

At the time of its original publication, Neobrownliella montisfracti had been recorded in scattered locations across Western Australia, New South Wales, and South Australia. It was reported to occur on Kangaroo Island in 2016.
