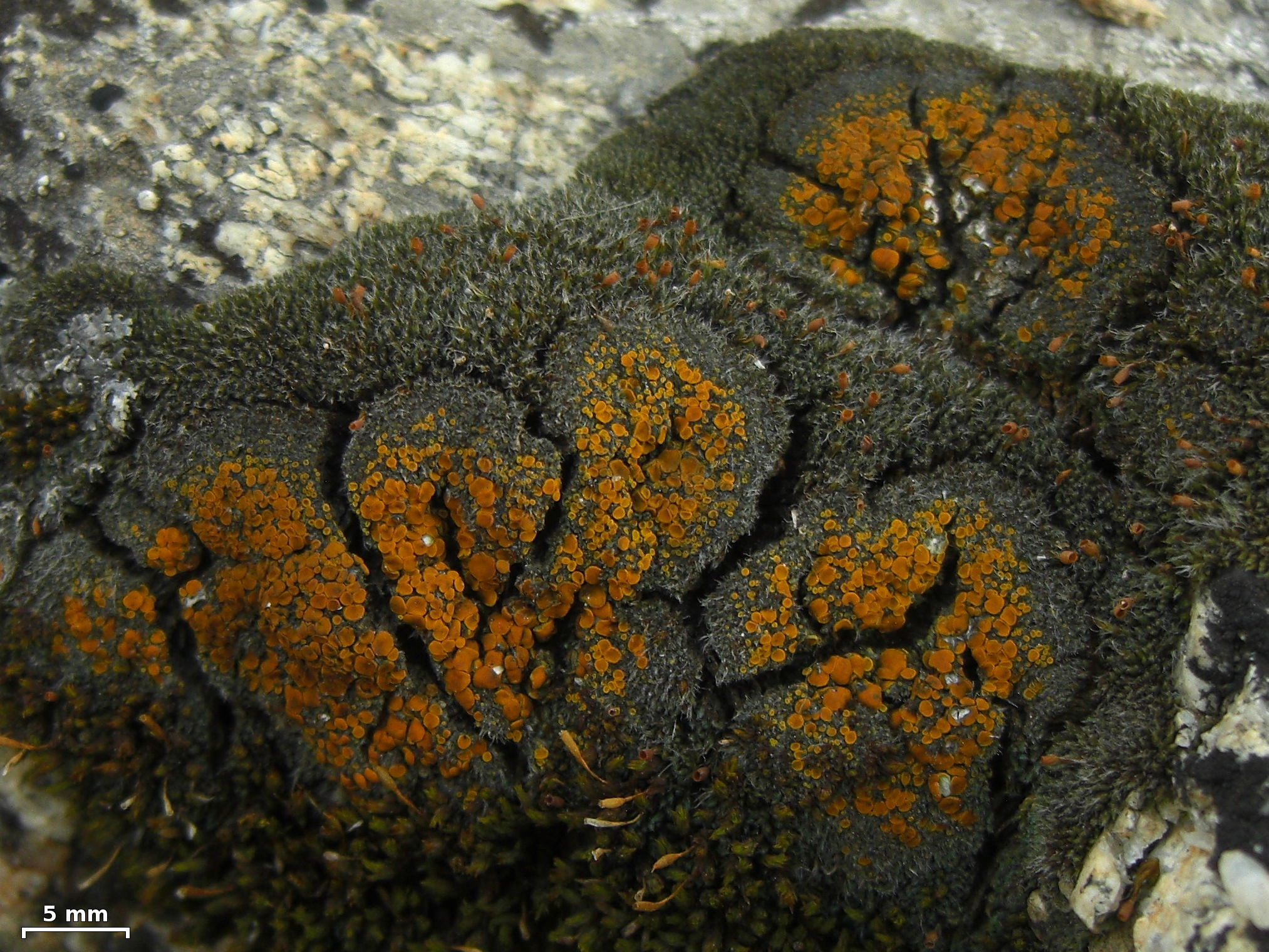

Conservation status
- Apparently Secure (NatureServe)

Scientific classification
- Kingdom: Fungi
- Division: Ascomycota
- Class: Lecanoromycetes
- Order: Teloschistales
- Family: Teloschistaceae
- Genus: Parvoplaca
- Species: P. tiroliensis

Binomial name
- Parvoplaca tiroliensis (Zahlbr.) Arup, Søchting & Frödén (2013)

Synonyms
- Caloplaca tiroliensis Zahlbr. (1903)

= Parvoplaca tiroliensis =

Species of lichen

Parvoplaca tiroliensis is a species of crustose lichen in the family Teloschistaceae, and the type species of the genus Parvoplaca. It is widely distributed, and has been recorded growing on a variety of substrates, including moss, dead plant material, and bone.

== Taxonomy ==
The lichen was formally described as a species new to science in 1903 by the Austrian-Hungarian lichenologist Alexander Zahlbruckner, who initially classified it in the genus Caloplaca. Ulf Arup and colleagues transferred the taxon to the genus Parvoplaca in 2013, following a molecular phylogenetics-based restructuring of the family Teloschistaceae.

== Description ==
Parvoplaca tirolensis is a muscicolous lichen, characterised by a thallus that tends to be obscured or blend into the moss it grows upon. The apothecia (fruiting bodies) of this species are dispersed and sessile, typically measuring about 0.2 mm in diameter, though they can reach up to 0.3 mm. In its early stages, the disc of the apothecia is flat to slightly concave and has a yellow hue with a greenish tinge. As it matures, the disc turns to an olive colour, retaining a yellowish tinge.

The margin of the apothecia is thick and prominent, initially yellow before becoming more or less the same colour as the disc. The lateral margins, however, often retain a more pronounced yellow colour. The thalline margin of the apothecia is abundant in algae. The proper margin has a fan-shaped structure made of prosoplectenchymatic, conglutinated cells.

The hypothecium of Parvoplaca tirolensis is hyaline and contains oil droplets. The hymenium measures between 70 and 100 μm and is characterized by medium coarse epipsamma. The paraphyses are slender, measuring 0.5–1 μm, and are sparsely branched at the apex. The upper cells are enlarged, about 4–6 μm thick, and constricted at the septa. The asci of this species typically contain eight spores. The spores themselves are sized 17–19 by 9–12 μm, with a septum measuring 4–4.5 μm.

=== Similar species ===
Athallia saxifragarum is a similar species with which Parvoplaca tirolensis might be confused. The former lichen is distinguished by its somewhat larger (0.4–1.0 mm wide) and more orange-coloured apothecial discs, and smaller ascospores (12–15 by 5–8 μm).

== Distribution ==
The lichen was reported from Iran in 2022, where it was found growing on the oak tree bark in Mawat. In Greenland, it has been recorded on old bone in addition to plant remains, the latter substrate together with Caloplaca cerina. In 2025, P. tiroliensis was documented from Medny Island in the Russian Far East, where it was growing on bryophytes on siliceous rocks. Globally, the lichen is treated as an arctic-alpine species with a circumpolar distribution.
