= Caloplaca ahtii =

Scientific classification
- Kingdom: Fungi
- Division: Ascomycota
- Class: Lecanoromycetes
- Order: Teloschistales
- Family: Teloschistaceae
- Genus: Caloplaca
- Species: C. ahtii

Binomial name
- Caloplaca ahtii Søchting (1994)

Species of lichen

Caloplaca ahtii is a species of corticolous (bark-dwelling) crustose lichen in the family Teloschistaceae. It was formally described as a new species in 1994 by Ulrik Søchting. The type locality was in Finland, and the type specimen was found growing on Populus. The species epithet honours Finnish lichenologist Teuvo Ahti. In 2022, the species was documented from North-Western European Russia. It is also found in North America.

== Description ==
Caloplaca ahtii has a rather inconspicuous growth form. Its thallus (the main body of the lichen) is effuse—meaning it spreads out thinly without clearly defined boundaries—and typically appears pale grey with a distinctive bluish tinge. In some populations outside of Britain, the thallus may develop small, confluent, scale-like segments (squamule-like areoles) measuring 0.1–0.2 mm in diameter, though this feature is absent in British specimens.

The most distinctive characteristic of this species is its reproductive structures. Rather than primarily reproducing through spore-producing bodies (apothecia), this lichen forms specialised structures called soralia. These soralia begin as small pustules that eventually rupture to reveal dark green to blue granular masses (soredia). The soralia are relatively sparse to numerous, measuring 0.1–0.15 (occasionally up to 0.2) mm in diameter. Each individual soredium ranges from 15 to 30 (sometimes up to 40) micrometres (μm) in diameter. The outer fungal filaments (hyphae) of these soredia contain a blue-green pigment that turns purple when tested with potassium hydroxide solution (K) and violet when treated with nitric acid.

While apothecia have not been observed in British material, they are known to occur in specimens from other regions. When present, these apothecia are scattered across the thallus, measuring approximately 0.4 mm in diameter, and display bright yellow to orange colouration. Young apothecia may have a pale grey margin derived from the thallus (thalline margin), but this typically disappears as the structure matures.

The spores (ascospores) produced within these apothecia measure 10.5–13 μm long by 5–7 μm wide, with a cross-wall (septum) that is 2.5–4 μm thick. When tested with potassium hydroxide (K), the thallus itself shows no reaction (K−), while both the soredia and the disc of the apothecia turn purple (K+ purple).

== See also ==
- List of Caloplaca species
