= Filsoniana =

Scientific classification
- Kingdom: Fungi
- Division: Ascomycota
- Class: Lecanoromycetes
- Order: Teloschistales
- Family: Teloschistaceae
- Genus: Filsoniana; S.Y.Kondr., Kärnefelt, Elix, A.Thell & Hur (2013)

Type species
- Filsoniana australiensis (S.Y.Kondr., Kärnefelt & Filson) S.Y.Kondr., Kärnefelt, Elix, A.Thell & Hur (2013)

Species
- F. australiensis F. fabricola F. ferdinandmuelleri F. kiamae F. lhasanensis F. rexfilsonii F. scarlatina

Genus of lichen-forming fungi

Filsoniana is a genus of squamulose lichens in the family Teloschistaceae. It has seven species. The genus was proposed in 2013 following molecular phylogenetic work on the Teloschistaceae, and its name honours the Australian lichenologist Rex Bertram Filson. Species of Filsoniana are typically rock-dwelling and are best represented in Australia, with additional records from New Zealand and Tibet. Filsoniana is distinguished from Caloplaca by its squamulose (scaly) thallus that contains anthraquinones, in the tissue structure comprising the rim (exciple) of the apothecia, and in differences in the cortical layer on the underside of the exciple.

== Taxonomy ==
Filsoniana was circumscribed in 2013 by Ingvar Kärnefelt, Arne Thell, Jae-Seoun Hur, Sergey Kondratyuk, and John Elix following a molecular phylogenetic analysis of the Teloschistaceae. The generic name honours the Australian lichenologist Rex Bertram Filson, "in recognition of his contribution to lichenology, in particular to the lichen flora of Australia".

== Description ==
Genus Filsoniana is characterised by its distinctive pinkish to brownish-pink body (thallus) that grows in either lobed or scale-like patterns. The outer protective layer (the cortex) of the lichen is made up of tightly packed, column-like cells arranged in a distinctive cellular pattern.

A distinctive feature of Filsoniana is its reproductive structures (apothecia), which vary in form from cup-shaped to partially enclosed. These structures are bordered by tissue (the excipulum) that matches the main body of the lichen and contains a similar cellular arrangement. Inside these reproductive structures, each spore-producing sac (ascus) typically contains eight spores, though usually only 4–6 develop fully. The spores themselves have two compartments with concentrated contents at opposite ends. The lichen also produces small, rod-shaped reproductive cells called conidia.

When tested with potassium hydroxide solution (K), both the thallus and apothecia turn purple, indicating the presence of anthraquinone compounds, specifically those related to the chemical parietin. This characteristic, along with its lobed or scaly growth form and distinctive cellular structure, distinguishes Filsoniana from the related genus Caloplaca. Additionally, genetic analysis places Filsoniana in a distinct group within the larger family Teloschistaceae.

== Habitat and distribution ==
Species of Filsoniana are mostly saxicolous, growing on a range of substrates including granite, quartzite, basalt, sandstone, schist, dolerite, and other volcanic rocks. They occupy both sheltered and exposed microsites, from coastal outcrops to subalpine settings and dry inland localities. In Australia, F. rexfilsonii has been recorded growing alongside F. australiensis. F. ferdinandmuelleri has been reported from terrestrial substrates, especially dolerite and other volcanic rocks, and may occur with other lichens including F. rexfilsonii and Kuettlingeria atroflava. In Tibet, F. lhasanensis occurs on open rocky ground in arid to semi-arid settings at 4,200 to 4,432 m (13,780 to 14,541 ft) and has been recorded with lichens including Aspicilia, Lecanora, and Rusavskia. By contrast, F. fabricola is known from the Lhasa area of Tibet, where the type was collected on the surface of old worn-out clothes at a field ridge in the mountains.

The genus is best represented in Australia, with records across Western Australia, the Northern Territory, Queensland, New South Wales, South Australia, Victoria, Tasmania, and the Australian Capital Territory. Some species also occur outside mainland Australia, including records from Kangaroo Island and Lord Howe Island. New Zealand records are documented for F. rexfilsonii and F. scarlatina. In China, F. lhasanensis is known from the Lhasa and Shannan areas, while F. fabricola is reported from the Lhasa area.

== Species ==
- Filsoniana australiensis (S.Y.Kondr., Kärnefelt & Filson) S.Y.Kondr., Kärnefelt, Elix, A.Thell & Hur (2013)
- Filsoniana fabricola H.Shahidin & X.L.Wei (2025) – China
- Filsoniana ferdinandmuelleri (S.Y.Kondr. & Kärnefelt) S.Y.Kondr., Kärnefelt, Elix, A.Thell & Hur (2013)
- Filsoniana kiamae (S.Y.Kondr. & Kärnefelt) S.Y.Kondr., Kärnefelt, Elix, A. Thell & Hur (2013)
- Filsoniana lhasanensis X.M.Wen, Shahidin & A.Abbas (2020) – Tibet
- Filsoniana rexfilsonii (S.Y.Kondr. & Kärnefelt) S.Y.Kondr., Kärnefelt, Elix, A.Thell & Hur (2013)
- Filsoniana scarlatina (Zahlbr.) S.Y.Kondr., Kärnefelt, Elix, A.Thell & Hur (2013)
