= Filsoniana scarlatina =

Scientific classification
- Kingdom: Fungi
- Division: Ascomycota
- Class: Lecanoromycetes
- Order: Teloschistales
- Family: Teloschistaceae
- Genus: Filsoniana
- Species: F. scarlatina

Binomial name
- Filsoniana scarlatina (Zahlbr.) S.Y.Kondr., Kärnefelt, Elix, A.Thell & Hur (2013)

Synonyms
- Caloplaca scarlatina Zahlbr. (1941)

Species of lichen-forming fungus

Filsoniana scarlatina is a species of crustose lichen in the family Teloschistaceae. It grows on rock surfaces in south-eastern Australia and New Zealand, where its thin, pale thallus is often almost hidden beneath a dense covering of vivid scarlet apothecia (fruiting bodies). The species was first described from schist rock near Dunedin in 1941 by the Austrian lichenologist Alexander Zahlbruckner, who placed it in the large genus Caloplaca; it was transferred to Filsoniana in 2013 following studies that split Caloplaca into smaller, more natural groupings.

== Taxonomy ==
The lichen was described as a new species by Alexander Zahlbruckner in 1941, as Caloplaca scarlatina. The species was collected on schist at Maeracs Hill near Dunedin, at about 200 m elevation, by the New Zealand botanist John Scott Thomson. In 2013, the taxon was transferred to Filsoniana, a segregate genus of Caloplaca.

== Description ==
This species forms a thin, crustose thallus on rock, spreading moderately but often hard to see because of the dense covering of apothecia (fruiting bodies). The thallus is tightly appressed to the substrate and only about 0.1 mm thick, with a slightly chalky appearance and a dull, pale fawn-buff colour. It is cracked into a rimose-areolate to areolate pattern, with flat, angular areoles separated by fine fissures that do not gape open. The margin lacks a black prothallus line. The photobiont is a green, cystococcoid alga, with spherical cells about 12–16 μm in diameter, clustered in groups.

Apothecia are extremely abundant, often crowded together and sometimes confluent. They may look biatorine at first glance, but they are actually lecanorine, with a very narrow thalline margin that is roughly the same colour as the thallus. This margin is initially slightly raised and later becomes depressed, and it contains algal cells. Apothecia are broadly sessile, 0.4–1.2 mm in diameter, scarlet, opaque, and not pruinose; they begin flat and later become convex to slightly tuberculate. Microscopically, the upper part of the hymenium is ferruginous, and potassium hydroxide solution (the K spot test) produces a purple colour (with a purple solution exuding), while the remainder is clear and colourless. The hymenium is about 90–95 μm high and turns blue in iodine before darkening. The hypothecium is thick and colourless, without an iodine reaction. Paraphyses are dense, threadlike (filiform), unbranched and aseptate, with slightly thickened tips. Asci contain eight spores. The ascospores are colourless, arranged in two rows, ellipsoid to somewhat cylindrical, with well-rounded ends, and polarilocular (two cells joined by a thin isthmus), measuring 12–14 × 4–5.5 μm.

== Habitat and distribution ==
Filsoniana scarlatina typically grows on siliceous rock substrates. It is widely distributed in south-eastern Australia, where it has been recorded from South Australia through New South Wales to Victoria, and it is also found in New Zealand.
