= Xanthoparmelia ahtii =

Conservation status
- Imperiled (NatureServe)

Scientific classification
- Kingdom: Fungi
- Division: Ascomycota
- Class: Lecanoromycetes
- Order: Lecanorales
- Family: Parmeliaceae
- Genus: Xanthoparmelia
- Species: X. ahtii

Binomial name
- Xanthoparmelia ahtii (Essl.) O.Blanco, A.Crespo, Elix, D.Hawksw. & Lumbsch (2004)

Synonyms
- Neofuscelia ahtii (Essl.) Essl. (1978); Parmelia ahtii Essl. (1977)

Species of lichen found in the US

Xanthoparmelia ahtii is a rock shield lichen that belongs to the family Parmeliaceae. One previous name for this species was Neofuscelia ahtii. The lichen is uncommon and is listed as imperiled by the Nature Conservatory.

== Description ==
The lichen grows on rocks and is olive brown to yellow or reddish brown in color. Lobes are approximately 1–2.5 mm wide and are slightly curved and broad.

== Habitat and range ==
It is found in the North American southwest growing on rocks. It has been observed in forested areas in the state of Arizona as well as well as the Mexican state of Baja California Sur.

== See also ==
- List of Xanthoparmelia species
