= Filsoniana australiensis =

Scientific classification
- Kingdom: Fungi
- Division: Ascomycota
- Class: Lecanoromycetes
- Order: Teloschistales
- Family: Teloschistaceae
- Genus: Filsoniana
- Species: F. australiensis

Binomial name
- Filsoniana australiensis (S.Y.Kondr., Kärnefelt & Filson) S.Y.Kondr., Kärnefelt, Elix, A.Thell & Hur (2013)
- Holotype: Merredin Peak, Western Australia

Synonyms
- Caloplaca australiensis S.Y.Kondr., Kärnefelt & Filson (2007)

Species of lichen

Filsoniana australiensis is a species of saxicolous (rock-dwelling), crustose lichen in the family Teloschistaceae. It is found in Australia. The lichen forms patches up to 9 cm wide, with dull pink to brownish pink lobes and a verrucose central area. It has distinctive, raised reddish-orange apothecia (fruiting bodies).

== Taxonomy ==
The lichen was formally described as Caloplaca australiensis in 2007 by the lichenologists Sergey Kondratyuk, Ingvar Kärnefelt, and Rex Filson. The type specimen was collected by the second author in Western Australia at Merredin Peak in Merredin. This particular specimen was found growing on sun-exposed rocks located in an area dominated by scrub vegetation on shallow soils. The collection site is a mount consisting entirely of monolithic granite. In 2013, the taxon was transferred to Filsoniana, a newly proposed genus that was segregated from Caloplaca.

== Description ==
Filsoniana australiensis has a thallus that typically spans 8–30 mm (5/16–1 3/16 in) wide, but also forms larger patches up to 5–9 cm (1 15/16–3 9/16 in). The thallus has distinct lobes, usually dull pink to dirty brownish pink, with marginal lobes measuring 1–3.5 millimetres (1/32–1/8 in) long. These lobes are thin and convex, often with white pruina at the tips and are interspersed with deep fissures. The central thallus area is characterised by irregularly shaped, convex areoles ranging from 0.3 to 0.8 mm in width, forming a verrucose or papillose texture.

Apothecia of Filsoniana australiensis range from 0.3 to 0.9 mm, occasionally up to 1.4 millimetres (1/16 in) in diameter. They are prominently raised above the substrate and have a reddish-orange disc. The thalline margin is thick and rose-coloured, while the proper margin is orange. The hymenium and subhymenium layers are distinct, with the former measuring 50–70 μm in height and the latter containing oil droplets. Ascospores are variable in size, generally long with a wide septum. In terms of standard chemical spot tests, it is K+ (violetish).

== Similar species ==
Filsoniana australiensis shares some resemblance with the Asian species Caloplaca scrobiculata in terms of its overall appearance and dull colouration. It can be distinguished by its eroded (scrobiculate) surface texture and a brighter thallus hue, which is attributed to the exposure of its white medullary layer. Unlike C. scrobiculata, F. australiensis lacks marginal lobes and has a different type of ascospores, along with a distinct geographical distribution.

When compared to the species Tarasginia tomareeana, F. australiensis is characterised by its dull pink thallus and thalline margin. The two species also differ in the morphology of their marginal and central thallus areas, as well as in the nature of their apothecia, with F. australiensis having lecanorine apothecia as opposed to the zeorine form in T. tomareeana.

Additionally, F. australiensis can be differentiated from the more commonly found species Filsoniana scarlatina and Filsoniana rexfilsonii. While these species share similar palisade inclusions in the cortical layer, F. australiensis sets itself apart with its almost rounded hyphal cells and unusually wide lumina measuring 4–5 μm.

== Habitat and distribution ==
Filsoniana australiensis is typically found on various rock types including granite, quartzite, basalt, sandstone, and schist, preferring sun-exposed locations. This species is recognised as the most prevalent among the pinkish-coloured inland variants of the genus Caloplaca (in the broad sense). Its presence has been recorded across a range of inland regions in Australia, including Western Australia, Northern Territory, Queensland, New South Wales, and South Australia.
