= Filsoniana rexfilsonii =

Scientific classification
- Kingdom: Fungi
- Division: Ascomycota
- Class: Lecanoromycetes
- Order: Teloschistales
- Family: Teloschistaceae
- Genus: Filsoniana
- Species: F. rexfilsonii

Binomial name
- Filsoniana rexfilsonii (S.Y.Kondr. & Kärnefelt) S.Y.Kondr., Kärnefelt, Elix, A.Thell & Hur (2013)
- Holotype: Coronation park, New South Wales

Synonyms
- Caloplaca rexfilsonii S.Y.Kondr. & Kärnefelt (2007)

Species of lichen

Filsoniana rexfilsonii is a species of saxicolous (rock-dwelling), crustose lichen in the family Teloschistaceae. Found in Australia, it was formally described as a new species in 2007. The thallus of Filsoniana rexfilsonii comprises brownish-orange squamules each hosting one to four reproductive structures.

== Taxonomy ==
The lichen was first formally described in 2007 by the lichenologists Sergey Kondratyuk and Ingvar Kärnefelt; it was initially placed in the genus Caloplaca. The type specimen of Caloplaca rexfilsonii was collected by the first author in New South Wales at Kiama, specifically from Coronation Park; the specimen was found on rock outcrops situated along the ocean coast. The species epithet honours Australian lichenologist Rex Bertram Filson. The taxon was transferred to the genus Filsoniana in 2013.

== Description ==
The thallus of Filsoniana rexfilsonii comprises squamules ranging from 0.4 to 2.0 mm in width and 0.4 to 0.6 mm in thickness. Each areole of the thallus typically hosts 1 to 4 conidiomata or apothecia. These squamules are generally flat, sometimes slightly overlapping, and are centrally attached, with marginal portions appearing to peel away. The colour of the squamules is brownish-orange, frequently marked with irregular whitish spots or lines. In cross-section, the marginal fragments of the thallus measure approximately 120 to 205 μm in thickness, while the central part of the areoles is about 150 to 250 μm thick.

The cortex of the thallus is between 50 and 150 (sometimes up to 200) μm thick, consisting of palisade tissue approximately 100 to 200 μm thick. There is a necrotic layer about 10 to 15 μm thick, and the epicortex is around 10 to 12 μm thick, with a bright yellow colour. The algal layer varies, being continuous to uneven, often forming columns between 20 and 250 μm thick. The medulla, resembling palisade tissue and measuring around 150 to 250 μm thick, is less distinct and appears as a loose network of hyphae 4 to 6 (less commonly, up to 8) μm wide.

The apothecia (fruiting bodies) of Filsoniana rexfilsonii are 0.3 to 0.7 mm in diameter with a slightly raised margin. The thalline margin matches the thallus in colour, while the proper margin and disc are dark orange. The hymenium stands about 80 to 90 μm high, with a layer below the hypothecium that is paraplectenchymatous. The true exciple is scleroplectenchymatous, measuring 15 to 20 μm thick in the lower lateral and basal portions. The paraphyses are apically widened to 4 to 6 μm in diameter and contain oil droplets, with rare occurrences of oil cells. The spores vary greatly in development within the same ascus, often with only 2 to 4 to 6 well-developed ascospores, typically measuring 16–20 by 7–10 μm, with a septum that is 2–5 μm. The conidia are bacilliform, measuring 3.4 to 3.6 by 1 μm.

Chemically, the thallus and epihymenium of Filsoniana rexfilsonii react K+ (red) and C−. It contains parietin as the major component, with minor amounts of fallacinal, parietinic acid, teloschistin, and trace amounts of physcoin bisanthrone.

== Habitat and distribution ==
Filsoniana rexfilsonii is found in a variety of habitats, commonly found on an array of rock types including basalts, dolerites, willemite ore, sandstone, granite, schist, and volcanic rocks. The species is adaptable to both sheltered and sun-exposed environments, ranging from coastal areas to subalpine regions and dry Australian localities. It is often seen growing alongside Filsoniana australiensis. Filsoniana rexfilsonii has a wide distribution across Australia, having been recorded in Western Australia, Northern Territory, Queensland, New South Wales, Australian Capital Territory, Victoria, South Australia, and Tasmania. It is also present on Lord Howe Island and in New Zealand.
