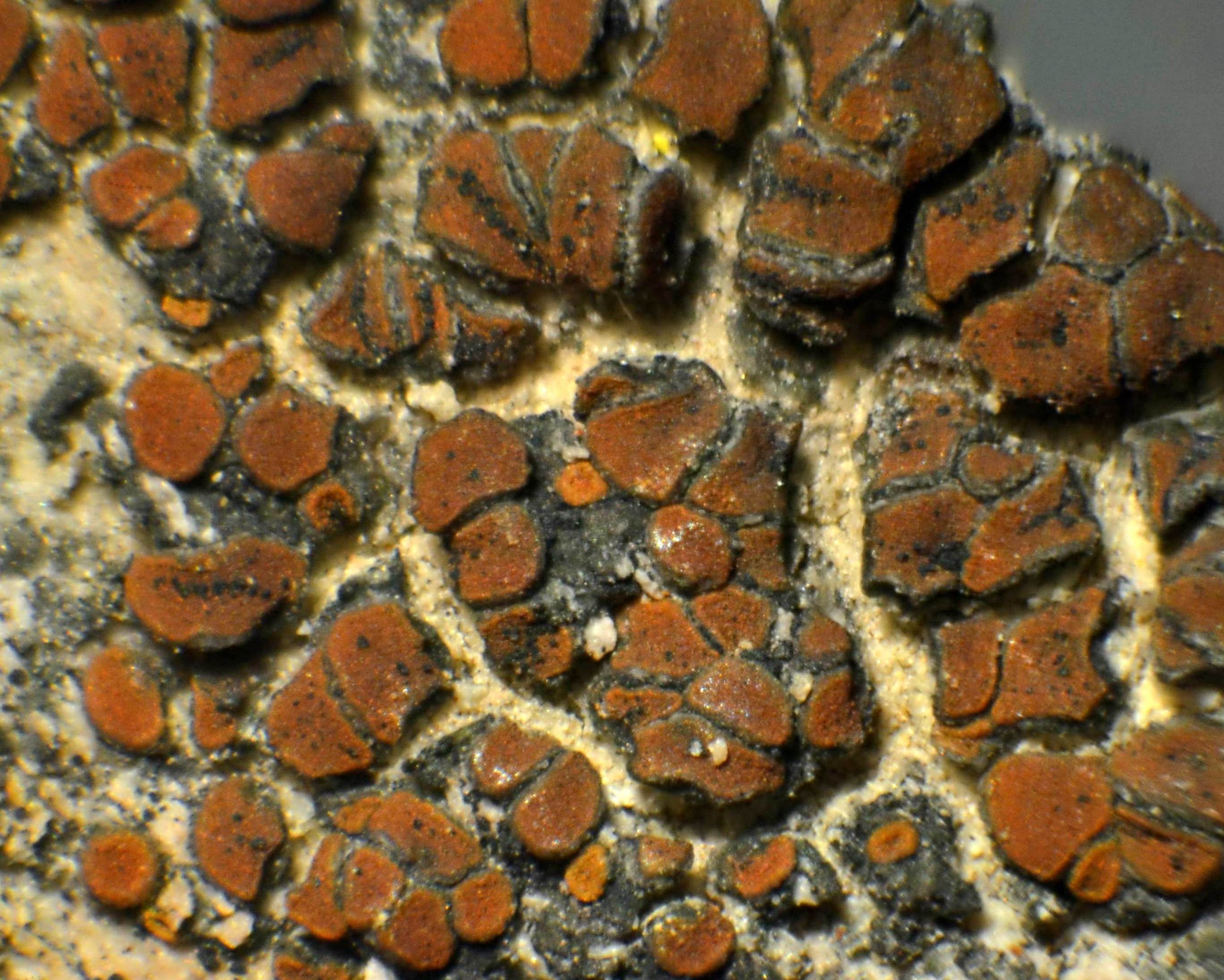

Scientific classification
- Kingdom: Fungi
- Division: Ascomycota
- Class: Lecanoromycetes
- Order: Teloschistales
- Family: Teloschistaceae
- Genus: Kuettlingeria
- Species: K. atroflava

Binomial name
- Kuettlingeria atroflava (Turner) I.V.Frolov, Vondrák & Arup (2020)

Synonyms
- List: Lecidea atroflava Turner (1808); Lichen atroflavus (Turner) Sm. (1809); Callopisma atroflavum (Turner) Arnold (1881); Lecanora atroflava (Turner) Cromb. (1894); Caloplaca fuscoatra var. atroflava (Turner) Boistel (1903); Caloplaca atroflava (Turner) Mong. (1914); Placodium atroflavum (Turner) A.L.Sm. (1918); Pyrenodesmia atroflava (Turner) S.Y.Kondr. (2020); Lecidea turneriana Ach. (1810); Lichen peltatus * turneriana (Ach.) Lam. (1813); Lecanora turneriana (Ach.) Cromb. (1876); Lecanora ferruginea var. turneriana (Ach.) Vain. (1881); Placodium ferrugineum var. turnerianum (Ach.) Vain. (1899); Caloplaca pyracea var. turneriana (Ach.) Boistel (1903); Caloplaca turneriana (Ach.) H.Olivier (1909); Placodium turnerianum (Ach.) A.L.Sm. (1918); Caloplaca ferruginea var. turneriana (Ach.) Mereschk. (1920); Lecanora pyracea f. submersa Nyl. (1885); Caloplaca pyracea var. submersa (Nyl.) H.Olivier (1909); Caloplaca pyracea f. submersa (Nyl.) Boistel (1913); Placodium pyraceum f. submersum (Nyl.) A.L.Sm. (1918); Caloplaca atroflava var. submersa (Nyl.) H.Magn. (1944)

= Kuettlingeria atroflava =

Species of lichen

Kuettlingeria atroflava is a species of saxicolous (rock-dwelling), crustose lichen in the family Teloschistaceae.

== Taxonomy ==
The lichen was first formally described in 1808 by the English botanist Dawson Turner, who classified it in the genus Lecidea. His diagnosis of the species was as follows: Lecidea with a thin, membranaceous, somewhat granular, black crust; with concave yellow apothecia, having an entire, elevated, paler margin". The type specimen was collected by William Borrer on the chalk hills (South Downs) near Brighton. Turner was impressed by the aesthetics of the lichen, commenting "The brilliant yellow shields of this Lichen form so lively a contrast with the dull black crust, that it deserves to be reckoned among our most beautiful British species".

In 1944, Adolf Hugo Magnusson reported examining the type specimen of Caloplaca turneriana (Ach.) Oliv., and he subsequently treated it as synonym of C. atroflava.

== Description ==
Kuettlingeria atroflava features a crustose thallus, typically measuring between 1 and 2 mm in diameter, and displays a dark grey to black hue. When fully mature, the thallus has a thin, cracked surface divided into convex areoles, each approximately 0.5 mm in diameter, surrounded by a well-developed, black, sometimes fringe-like prothallus.

The apothecia (fruiting bodies) are up to 0.5 mm in diameter and vary in frequency from scattered to densely packed. They have shapes ranging from rounded to irregularly curved, and are flat with a constricted base. These apothecia lack a thalline margin, but have a distinct, even, and convex proper margin that is bright orange and glossy, while the discs themselves are brown-orange. The paraphyses (sterile structures within the apothecium) are slender, segmented, and curve gently, with ends that are only slightly enlarged.

Ascospores are broadly ellipsoid and swollen, measuring 13–16 by 9–10 μm, with a septum (internal division) that is 5–7 μm wide, constituting one-third to one-half (or occasionally more) of the spore's length. Chemical spot test reactions of the thallus with potassium hydroxide solution (K) result in faintly purple areas, while the apothecia react by turning purple.

=== Similar species ===
Kuettlingeria atroflava closely resembles Rufoplaca scotoplaca, yet it can be distinguished by having a more pronounced apothecial margin. Additionally, Rufoplaca scotoplaca typically presents a darker disc and does not feature the green thalloidima found in Kuettlingeria atroflava.

== Habitat and distribution ==
In North America, it has been recorded from California and Colorado in the United States, and British Columbia in Canada.

It is categorised in the Estonian Regional Red List as "Regionally Extinct".
