= Teuvo Ahti =

Finnish botanist and lichenologist (born 1934)

Teuvo Tapio Ahti
- Born: 14 June 1934 (age 92); Helsinki
- Education: University of Helsinki
- Awards: Acharius Medal
- Scientific career
- Fields: Lichenology
- Workplaces: University of Helsinki; Finnish Museum of Natural History
- Author abbrev. (botany): Ahti

Teuvo "Ted" Tapio Ahti (born 14 June 1934) is a Finnish botanist and lichenologist who has made considerable contributions to the taxonomy and biogeography of lichens. Known particularly for his work on the lichen family Cladoniaceae, he has had a long career at the University of Helsinki beginning in 1963, and following his retirement in 1997, has continued his research at the Botanical Museum of the Finnish Museum of Natural History. His research output spans more than seven decades, comprising over 450 scientific publications across lichenology, mycology, and botanical science.

Ahti has conducted extensive fieldwork on all continents except Antarctica, with particular focus on Arctic regions and the Americas. He served as president of the International Association for Lichenology (1975–1981) and has received numerous honours, including the Acharius Medal in 2000 for lifetime contributions to lichenology. His expertise extends beyond lichens to include vegetation studies, phytogeography, and fungal taxonomy. Two Festschrifts have been dedicated to him: one in 1994 for his 60th birthday and another in 2024 for his 90th birthday. His influence on the field is reflected in the numerous taxa named in his honour, including four genera and more than twenty species.

== Early life and education ==
Ahti was born in Helsinki on 14 June 1934 and spent his childhood summers in Asikkala, South Häme, where he learned to identify edible mushrooms. While in school, he developed an interest in botany during a summer project collecting and preparing plant specimens for a herbarium. His introduction to lichenology came through a classmate whose brother was married to the daughter of renowned lichenologist Veli Räsänen; during their joint birdwatching excursions in Helsinki, this friend shared his knowledge of lichens with Ahti.

In 1952, while still a schoolboy, Ahti took a position as a forest inventory biologist in the National Forest Survey, a role that required comprehensive knowledge of plants, lichens, and mosses. His skills as a competitive orienteer proved valuable in this fieldwork. He documented these early professional experiences in his first publication, an article in Molekyyli, a natural history magazine for young people. He continued this forest inventory work in 1953, gaining practical experience in field biology before beginning his university studies.

== Education and career ==
Ahti started developing an interest in botany at the age of 15, when he worked on a class project involving collecting 100 species of plants. His attention turned to lichens when a classmate who had worked for Veli Räsänen pointed them out during a birdwatching excursion in Helsinki. His interest was further fuelled when a couple of years later, he had to pass a test on identification of forest floor lichens and bryophytes as part of an application for work at the Finnish Forest Research Institute. He honed his identification skills during another summer job a few years later inventorying reindeer in Lapland.

After completing his military service, Ahti began his studies at the University of Helsinki in autumn 1954. Though he initially aimed to become a biology teacher, he later changed his focus from zoology and geography to genetics. While studying, he worked at the Forest Research Institute identifying plant materials collected during forest inventories. In 1957, he was hired by the provincial Government of Newfoundland to undertake a study of caribou habitat. He collected 3500 specimens from nearly 80 localities across the province; these collections were later used as data in several floristic articles dealing with various lichen taxa. His analysis of these results proved sufficient for a Master's thesis, leading to his MSc degree that same year.

Ahti studied natural science at the University of Helsinki, from where he earned an MSc in 1957, and a PhD in 1961. His thesis was entitled "Taxonomic studies on reindeer lichens (Cladonia, subgenus Cladina)". He started employment in 1964 at the University of Helsinki Botanical Garden with the title Curator of Cryptogams, eventually working up to Deputy Head Curator of Phanerogams during 1965–1968, and then Head Curator of the Division of Cryptogams in 1969. In 1979, Ahti became a professor of Cryptogamic Taxonomy at the University of Helsinki, and a research professor at the Academy of Finland in 1991. His facility with multiple languages, including Russian, proved valuable in communicating with colleagues internationally throughout his career. Since retiring in 1996, Ahti has been a research associate with the Finnish Museum of Natural History in Helsinki.

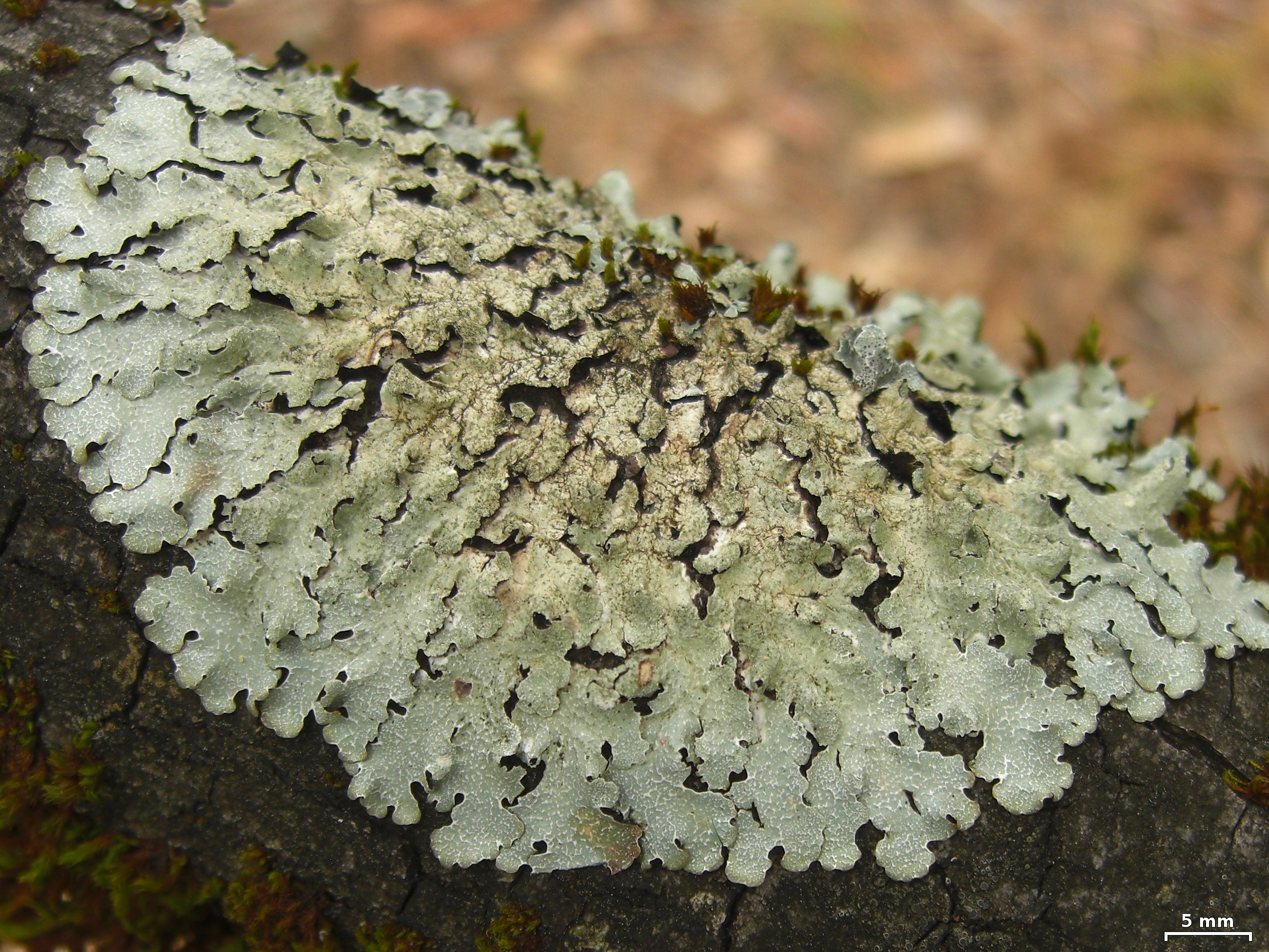
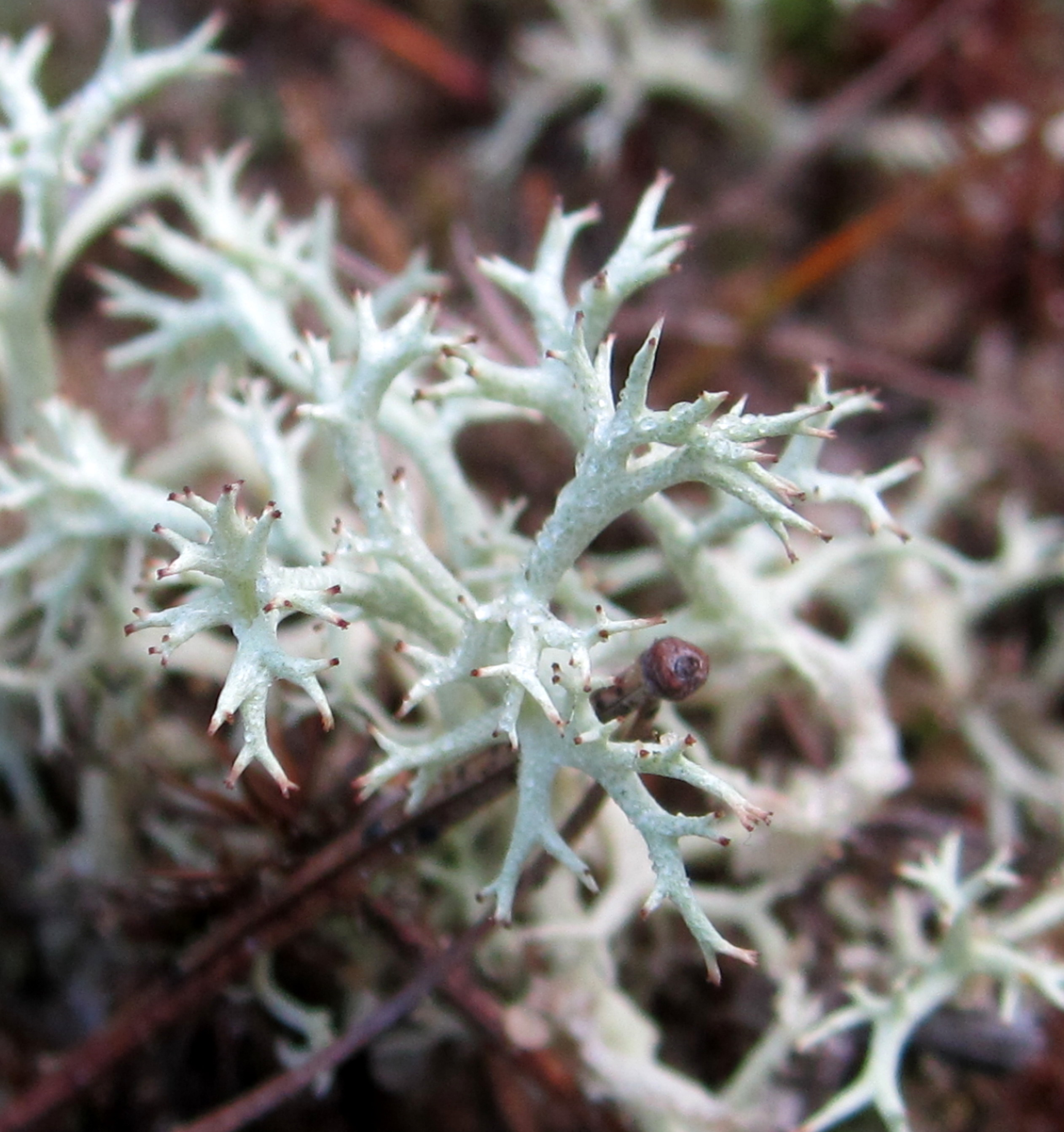
Two of the species that Ahti has introduced as new to science include Parmelia hygrophila Goward & Ahti (top) and Cladonia terrae-nova Ahti (bottom)

Ahti was president of the International Association for Lichenology from 1975 to 1981. In addition to numerous research trips within Europe, he has also been to Asia, North and South America, and Australasia. His Arctic lichen research expeditions have taken him to locations such as the Murmansk Coast, the northeast coast of Iceland, and the Sakha Republic (Russian Arctic). One of his favourite exotic locations was the tepui mountains of the Venezuelan Guayana, reachable only by helicopter. As of 2017, Ahti had more than 280 publications dealing with lichens, mosses, fungi, and phytogeography. Known as a specialist of the Cladoniaceae, he wrote a monograph on this subject for the journal series Flora Neotropica, which reviewer William Culberson called "the long-awaited fulfillment of an old promise by one of the world's master taxonomists." In the monograph, Ahti accepted 184 species of Cladoniaceae from the Neotropical realm, including 29 new taxa. Ahti made the numerous publications of William Nylander generally accessible through a five-volume reprint edition. He has also made the subject of botany and lichens more popular and accessible to the general public through his work with the Nordic Lichen Flora, a series of books describing all lichens found in Nordic countries.

== Personal life ==
Teuvo Ahti is married to botanist and vascular plant taxonomist Leena Hämet-Ahti, who he met while they were both completing their MSc degrees. They married in 1960, and had a "honeymoon" in Wells Gray Provincial Park (central British Columbia, Canada). Rather than focusing solely on lichens, the newlyweds decided to conduct a comprehensive survey of the region's terrestrial flora. They collected several thousands of specimens of plants, mosses, liverworts, and lichens. Their collaborative work in Wells Gray helped give the park international visibility, with Leena publishing both a vascular flora of the park and an influential paper on its vegetation zones. In 1967, they collected 3000 specimens of vascular plants in Alaska, the Yukon, northern British Columbia, and Alberta.

== Research and contributions ==
Ahti has made substantial contributions to lichenology and botanical science over a career spanning more than seven decades. By 2014, he had published 417 scientific works, with his publication count reaching approximately 458 by 2024. While known primarily for his work on lichens, particularly the Cladoniaceae, his research interests encompassed a broader scope including ecology, vegetation studies, floristics, macro- and microfungi, lichenicolous fungi, bryophytes, phanerogams, and phytogeography. His fieldwork has extended to all continents except Antarctica, conducting both specific research projects and participating in field meetings and congresses.

A significant contribution to the field was his editorial work on William Nylander's lichenological papers, which he compiled into a six-volume series. The first three volumes (IV–VI) were published in 1967, followed by volumes I–III in 1990. The final volumes included the first substantial English-language biography of Nylander and a revised list of his lichenological publications. Throughout his career, Ahti has served on multiple editorial boards, including those of The Lichenologist, Nordic Lichen Flora, and several Finnish mycological publications including Karstenia, Sienilehti, and Suursieniopas.

== Recognition ==
A Festschrift was dedicated to Ahti in 1994 for his 60th birthday, titled Focus on Lichen Taxonomy and Biogeography: A Festschrift in Honour of Teuvo Ahti. This publication, part of the Acta Botanica Fennica series, contains 30 scientific papers written by 45 authors. Ahti was awarded the Acharius Medal in 2000, which is given for lifetime achievement in lichenology. He is an honorary member of the Russian Botanical Society of the Russian Academy of Sciences. In 2011, Ahti, along with co-authors Soili Stenroos, Katileena Lohtander, and Leena Myllys, won the Tieto-Finlandia Award for their non-fiction work Suomen jäkäläopas ("Finnish lichen guide").

A second Festschrift was dedicated to Ahti in 2024 on the occasion of his 90th birthday, published as a Special Issue of The Lichenologist. This tribute included a Laudatio ("in praise of") written by Orvo Vitikainen, Irwin Brodo, and Trevor Goward chronicling his career achievements, followed by ten scientific papers from colleagues worldwide covering diverse aspects of lichenology. The special issue reflected both Ahti's primary research interests and his ability to foster international scientific collaboration throughout his career.

=== Eponymy ===
Four genera and several species have been named to honour Ahti. These include:

Ahtia M.J.Lai (1980); Ahtiana Goward (1986); Teuvoa Sohrabi & S.D.Leav. (2013); Teuvoahtiana S.Y.Kondr. & Hur (2017); Parmelia ahtii Essl. (1977); Lecanora ahtii Vänskä (1986); Cladonia ahtii S.Stenroos (1989); Caloplaca ahtii Søchting (1994); Physma ahtianum Verdon & Elix (1994); Ramalina ahtii Kashiw. & T.H.Nash (1994); Stenocybe ahtii Titov & Baĭbul. (1994); Thelotrema ahtii Sipman (1994); Tuckneraria ahtii Randlane & Saag (1994); Unguiculariopsis ahtii D.Hawksw., D.J.Galloway & S.Y.Kondr. (1994); Hypotrachyna ahtiana Elix, T.H.Nash & Sipman (2009); Melanelixia ahtii S.D.Leav., Essl., Divakar, A.Crespo & Lumbsch (2016); Dactylospora ahtii Zhurb. & Pino-Bodas (2017); Neolamya ahtii Zhurb. (2017); Stigmidium ahtii Etayo & Palice (2017); Verrucaria ahtii Pykälä, Launis & Myllys (2017); Halecania ahtii Zhdanov (2020); Bryoria ahtiana Myllys & Goward (2023); Caeruleoconidia ahtii Zhurb (2024); Candelariella ahtii Yakovchenko (2024); Cladonia teuvoana Pino-Bodas, Burgaz & Aptroot (2024); Umbilicaria ahtii Davydov (2024);

== Selected publications ==
A complete listing of Ahti's scientific publications up to 2017 is given in Belyaeva and Chamberlain's tribute. Some of his major works include:

- Teuvo, Ahti (1959). "Studies on the caribou lichen stands of Newfoundland". Annales Botanici Fennici. 30 (4): 1–44.
- Ahti, Teuvo; Hämet-Ahti, Leena; Jalas, Jaakko (1968). "Vegetation zones and their sections in northwestern Europe". Annales Botanici Fennici. 5 (3): 169–211. JSTOR 23724233.
- Ahti, Teuvo; Oksanen, Jari (1990). "Epigeic lichen communities of taiga and tundra regions". Vegetatio. 86 (1): 39–70. doi:10.1007/BF00045134.
- Stenroos, Soili; Hyvonen, Jaakko; Myllys, Leena; Thell, Arne; Ahti, Teuvo (2002). "Phylogeny of the genus Cladonia s.lat. (Cladoniaceae, ascomycetes) inferred from molecular, morphological, and chemical data". Cladistics. 18 (3): 237–278. doi:10.1111/j.1096-0031.2002.tb00151.x. PMID 34911250.
- Stenroos, Soili; Pino-Bodas, Raquel; Hyvönen, Jaakko; Lumbsch, Helge Thorsten; Ahti, Teuvo (2018). "Phylogeny of the family Cladoniaceae (Lecanoromycetes, Ascomycota) based on sequences of multiple loci". Cladistics. 35 (4): 351–384. doi:10.1111/cla.12363. hdl:10261/247495. PMID 34633698.
