= Parietin =

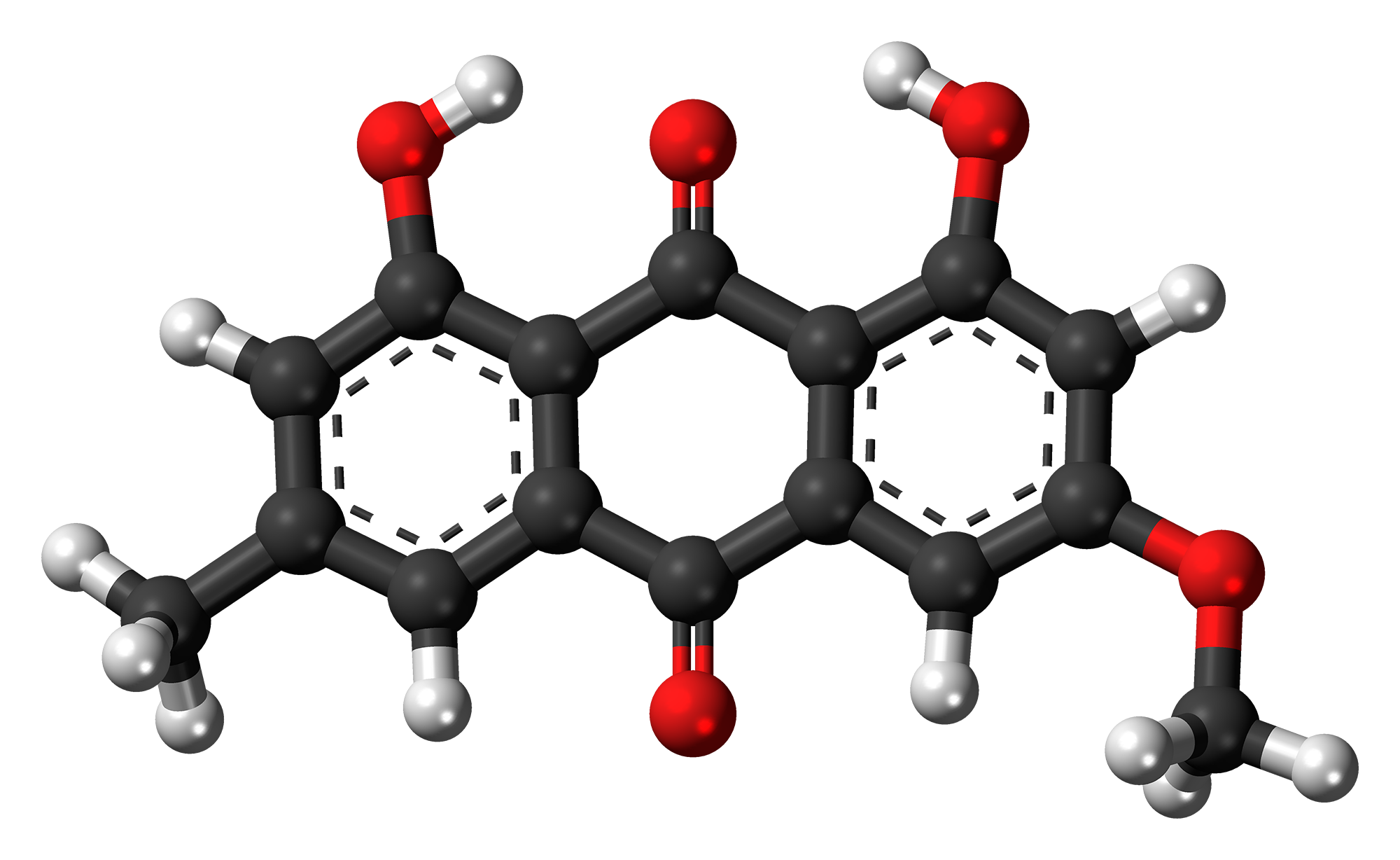

Names
- Preferred IUPAC name 1,8-Dihydroxy-3-methoxy-6-methylanthracene-9,10 dione
- Other names Physcion(e), rheochrysidin, methoxyemodin

Identifiers
CAS Number	521-61-9
3D model (JSmol)	Interactive image
ChemSpider	10193
ECHA InfoCard	100.007.561
KEGG	C17045
PubChem CID	10639
UNII	H6PT94IV61
CompTox Dashboard (EPA)	DTXSID20200101
- InChI: InChI=1S/C16H12O5/c1-7-3-9-13(11(17)4-7)16(20)14-10(15(9)19)5-8(21-2)6-12(14)18/h3-6,17-18H,1-2H3 Key: FFWOKTFYGVYKIR-UHFFFAOYSA-N; InChI=1/C16H12O5/c1-7-3-9-13(11(17)4-7)16(20)14-10(15(9)19)5-8(21-2)6-12(14)18/h3-6,17-18H,1-2H3 Key: FFWOKTFYGVYKIR-UHFFFAOYAX
- SMILES: Oc1cc(OC)cc(C2=O)c1C(=O)c3c2cc(C)cc3O

Properties
Chemical formula	C_{16}H_{12}O_{5}
Molar mass	284.267 g·mol^{−1}
Appearance	Orange/yellow solid

Hazards
- GHS labelling
Pictograms	(GHS07: Exclamation mark)
Signal word	Warning
Hazard statements	H315, H319, H335
Precautionary statements	P261, P264, P264+P265, P271, P280, P302+P352, P304+P340, P305+P351+P338, P319, P321, P332+P317, P337+P317, P362+P364, P403+P233, P405, P501
- Lethal dose or concentration (LD, LC)
LD_{50} (median dose)	10 mg/kg (mouse, intraperitoneal)

Related compounds
Related compounds	Emodin
- Except where otherwise noted, data are given for materials in their standard state (at 25 °C [77 °F], 100 kPa). verify (what is ?) Infobox references

Parietin, or physcion, is the predominant cortical pigment of lichens in the genus Caloplaca, a secondary product of the lichen Xanthoria parietina, and a pigment found in the roots of curled dock (Rumex crispus). It has an orange-yellow color and absorbs blue light.

Parietin has also been shown to protect lichens against UV-B light, at high altitudes in alpine regions. The UV-B light stimulates production of parietin, protecting the lichens from damage. Lichens in arctic regions such as Svalbard retain this capability though they do not encounter damaging levels of UV-B, a capability that could help protect the lichens in case of ozone layer thinning.

It has also shown antifungal activity against barley powdery mildew and cucumber powdery mildew, more efficiently in the latter case than treatments with fenarimol and polyoxin B.

It reacts with KOH to form a deep, reddish-magenta compound.

== Effect on human cancer cells ==
Also found in rhubarb, the orange compound appears to have potential to suppress 6-phosphogluconate dehydrogenase, or 6PGD. 6PGD is the third enzyme of the pentose phosphate pathway, or PPP, an oxidative process fueling growth in a still-relatively-unknown way. But it appears that arresting the chemical machinery at its third step could be promising for oncology. The parietin, identified from an FDA database of 2,000 known suppressors of 6PGD, killed half the human leukemia cells over two days in the laboratory. The pigment also slowed the growth of other human cancer cells in mouse models, according to the study. A more-potent derivative of the parietin called S3 may even cut the growth of lung cancer cells implanted in mice by two-thirds, over the course of 11 days. The compound also appears to be non-toxic to healthy cells.
