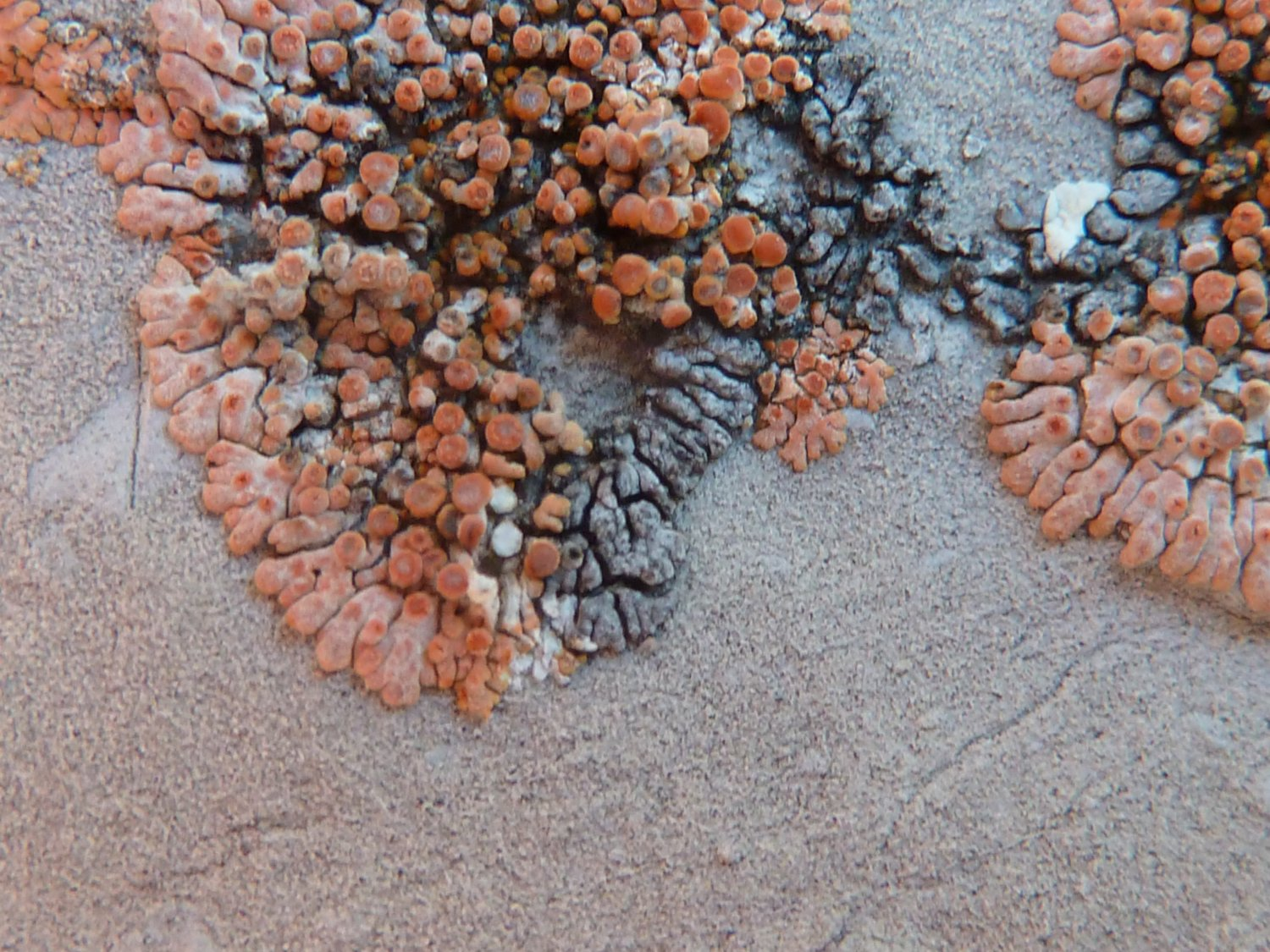
- Verrucula arnoldaria (darkened parts of thallus) growing on Calogaya arnoldii

Scientific classification
- Domain: Eukaryota
- Kingdom: Fungi
- Division: Ascomycota
- Class: Eurotiomycetes
- Order: Verrucariales
- Family: Verrucariaceae
- Genus: Verrucula; J.Steiner (1896)

Type species
- Verrucula egyptiaca (Müll.Arg.) J.Steiner (1896)

Species
- See text

= Verrucula =

Genus of lichens

Verrucula is a genus of lichenicolous (lichen-dwelling) lichens in the family Verrucariaceae. Species in the genus are parasitic on saxicolous (rock-dwelling), crustose lichens, including Xanthoria elegans as well as lichens from genus Caloplaca that contain chemical substances called anthraquinones.

== Taxonomy ==
Verrucula was originally circumscribed in 1896 by Austrian lichenologist Julius Steiner to contain a group of parasitic Verrucaria species. It was subsequently little used until 2007, when it was resurrected for use for Verrucaria found as parasites on Caloplaca with anthraquinone compounds. Other parasitic species were moved to genus Verruculopsis; these two genera are morphologically quite similar. Molecular phylogenetic analysis shows that Verrucula has a sister taxon relationship with Placocarpus in the family Verrucariaceae.

== Description ==
Verrucula lichens have a thallus that is areolate to a mixture of squamulose and areolate, and is sometimes reduced in form. The upper cortex is only weakly developed, and is termed a pseudocortex. The excipulum (the ring-shaped layer surrounding the hymenium) is pale except for the pale to pale brown area around the ostiole. Ascospores are colorless, and usually simple, although in rare instances they have a single septum. Pycnidia in Verrucula are similar in form to those found in genus Dermatocarpon. This is pycnidial type is characterised by its paraplectenchymatous net (paraplectenchyma is a fungal tissue with a cellular structure superficially like the parenchyma of vascular plants) and its multiple cavities.

== Species ==
As of July 2022, Species Fungorum accepts 16 species of Verrucula. The following list gives the species name, author citation (using standard abbreviations), year of publication, and host lichen. The host specificity in genus Verrucula is quite high, as each species seems to parasitise a single host.

- Verrucula arnoldaria Nav.-Ros. & Cl.Roux (2007) – Calogaya arnoldii
- Verrucula biatorinaria (Zehetl.) Nav.-Ros. & Cl.Roux (2007) – Calogaya biatorina
- Verrucula clauzadaria Nav.-Ros. & Cl.Roux (2007) – Caloplaca clauzadeana
- Verrucula coccinearia (Zehetl.) Nav.-Ros. & Cl.Roux (2007) – Caloplaca coccinea
- Verrucula coronataria Nav.-Ros. & Cl.Roux (2007) – Flavoplaca coronata
- Verrucula elegantaria (Zehetl.) Nav.-Ros. & Cl.Roux (2007) – Xanthoria elegans
- Verrucula helvetica (B.de Lesd.) Nav.-Ros. & Cl.Roux (2007) – Leproplaca cirrochroa
- Verrucula hladuniana (Nav.-Ros. & Cl.Roux) Nav.-Ros. & Cl.Roux (2007) – Flavoplaca marina
- Verrucula inconnexaria Nav.-Ros. & Cl.Roux (2007) – Caloplaca inconnexa
- Verrucula lactearia Nav.-Ros. & Cl.Roux (2007) – Xanthocarpia lactea
- Verrucula maritimaria Nav.-Ros. & Cl.Roux (2007) – Flavoplaca maritima
- Verrucula microspora Nav.-Ros. & Cl.Roux (2014) – Variospora velana
- Verrucula navasianaria Nav.-Ros. & Cl.Roux (2007) – Flavoplaca navasiana
- Verrucula polycarparia Nav.-Ros. & Cl.Roux (2007) – Flavoplaca polycarpa
- Verrucula protearia (Zehetl.) Nav.-Ros. & Cl.Roux (2007) – Leproplaca proteus
- Verrucula pusillaria Nav.-Ros. & Cl.Roux (2007) – Calogaya pusilla

Some species previously classified in Verrucula have since been reduced to synonymy with other species, or have been transferred to different genera:

- Verrucula ahlesiana (Hepp) J.Steiner (1898) (= Laestadia ahlesiana)
- Verrucula cahirensis (J.Steiner) J.Steiner (1896) (= Guignardia cahirensis)
- Verrucula egyptiaca (Müll.Arg.) J.Steiner (1896) (= Guignardia egyptiaca)
- Verrucula fraudulosa (Nyl.) J.Steiner (1898) (= Verruculopsis lecideoides)
- Verrucula fuscella (Turner) J.Steiner (1898) (= Verrucaria fuscella)
- Verrucula granulosaria (Clauzade & Zehetl.) Nav.-Ros. & Cl.Roux (2007) (= Verrucaria latericola)
- Verrucula latericola (Erichsen) Nav.-Ros. & Cl.Roux (2007) (= Verrucaria latericola)
- Verrucula lecideoides (A.Massal.) J.Steiner (1898) (= Verruculopsis lecideoides)
- Verrucula rheitrophila (Zschacke) M.Choisy (1950) (= Hydropunctaria rheitrophila)
