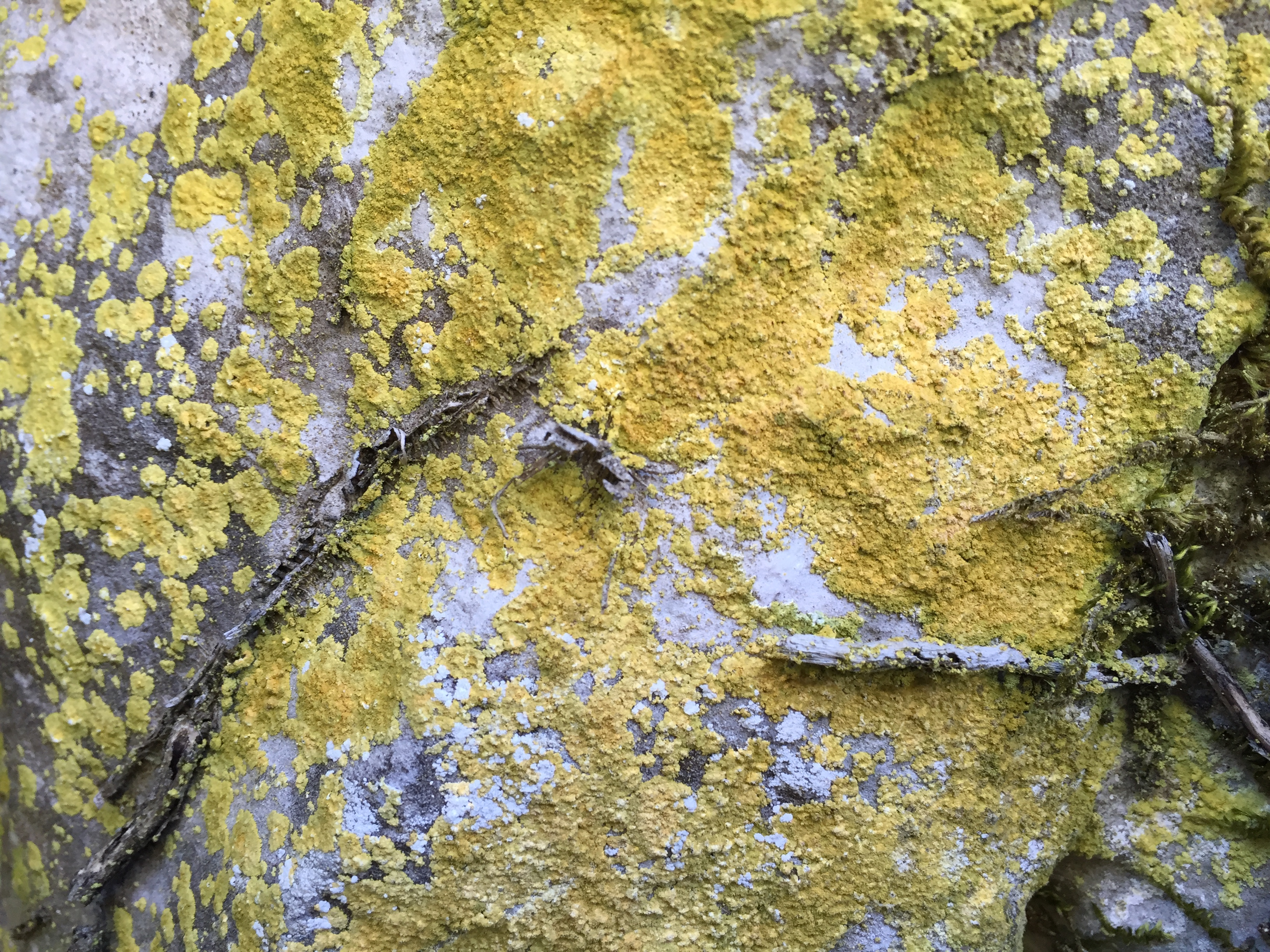

Scientific classification
- Kingdom: Fungi
- Division: Ascomycota
- Class: Lecanoromycetes
- Order: Teloschistales
- Family: Teloschistaceae
- Genus: Leproplaca
- Species: L. xantholyta

Binomial name
- Leproplaca xantholyta (Nyl.) Nyl. (1888)

Synonyms
- List: Lecanora xantholyta Nyl. (1879); Caloplaca xantholyta (Nyl.) Jatta (1902); Gasparrinia xantholyta (Nyl.) Szatala (1941); Lepraria xantholyta (Nyl.) Lettau (1910); Physcia xantholyta (Nyl.) Arnold (1881); Placodium xantholytum (Nyl.) Nyl. (1896)

= Leproplaca xantholyta =

Species of lichen-forming fungus

Leproplaca xantholyta is a species of rock-dwelling, crustose lichen-forming fungus in the family Teloschistaceae. First described by William Nylander in 1879, it forms a thin, bright yellow, powdery crust on shaded limestone and is always sterile, never producing fruiting bodies. It occurs locally across Europe, from Ireland east to Israel.

== Taxonomy ==
The species was first formally described by William Nylander in 1879, as Lecanora xantholyta. In the protologue, he described it from sterile material, characterizing it by its thin, entirely powdery (leprose), egg-yolk-yellow thallus, which was somewhat lobed and gave a purplish reaction with potassium hydroxide (K). Nylander also noted its resemblance to Lecanora citrochroa and recorded it as growing on bark in England from material collected by Edward Morell Holmes.

In 1883, Nylander treated the species in Leproplaca as Leproplaca xantholyta, thereby placing it in a genus he used for leprose, usually sterile lichens. In that account, he corrected the original habitat statement, noting that "corticolous" in the 1879 protologue was an error for calcicolous, and added two saxicolous localities: on calcareous-impregnated sandstone in the Forest of Fontainebleau, at Mare à Piat, France, where it occurred with Lecanora callopisma (now known as Variospora aurantia), and on limestone in western England at Bangor, collected by D. Griffith. He described the lichen as conspicuous, with a thin, soft, citron-golden thallus that was somewhat leprose, white within, and often spread into fairly broad patches. He reported the presence of chrysophanic acid, giving a purplish reaction with potassium hydroxide solution. Nylander also regarded Leproplaca as a subgenus allied to forms that were usually sterile or only rarely produced apothecia, and compared it with Leproloma.

A more modern interpretation was given by Jack Laundon in 1974, who treated the species as Leproplaca xantholyta and considered Leproplaca worthy of recognition as a separate genus within the Teloschistaceae. He argued that the species had often been placed in Caloplaca because of its anthraquinone chemistry, probably parietin, which gives the thallus a K+ (violet-red) staining reaction, but that it was well separated from that genus by its non-corticate thallus and lack of fruiting bodies. Laundon also cited the type locality as Great Orme, Llandudno, on limestone, and referred to a Holmes specimen at the British Museum as an isotype.

== Description ==
Leproplaca xantholyta has a crustose, sharply bordered thallus that is orbicular when well developed, though older growth may become irregular and scattered. The thallus is yellow, with a margin formed of radiating, flattened, powdery (pulverulent) lobes. Its surface is usually continuous and more or less flat, only occasionally breaking into low convex granules, and it lacks a cortex. The medulla is white and may show through where the thallus has been rubbed. As in other members of the genus, apothecia and pycnidia are absent.

Chemically, the thallus is C−, K+ (violet-red), and P−. It contains a single anthraquinone product conforming with parietin. Small crystals develop on herbarium material, while the thallus itself contains numerous crystals, often relatively large. The combination of a yellow powdery thallus with marginal lobes and a K+ violet-red reaction helps distinguish the species from other sterile lichens in Britain.

== Habitat and distribution ==
This lichen grows in damp, shaded habitats on hard vertical calcareous rocks, especially limestone. It grows on calcareous substrates (calcicolous), shade-loving, and probably weakly nitrophilous (tolerant of nitrogen enrichment), and may benefit from low levels of nitrogen enrichment, for instance from bird droppings or dust. It is absent from man-made stone such as concrete. In the British Isles, the species is local in parts of Highland Britain and rare in Lowland Britain, although it can be abundant where it occurs. More broadly, it as a south European species ranging from Ireland eastwards to Israel.
