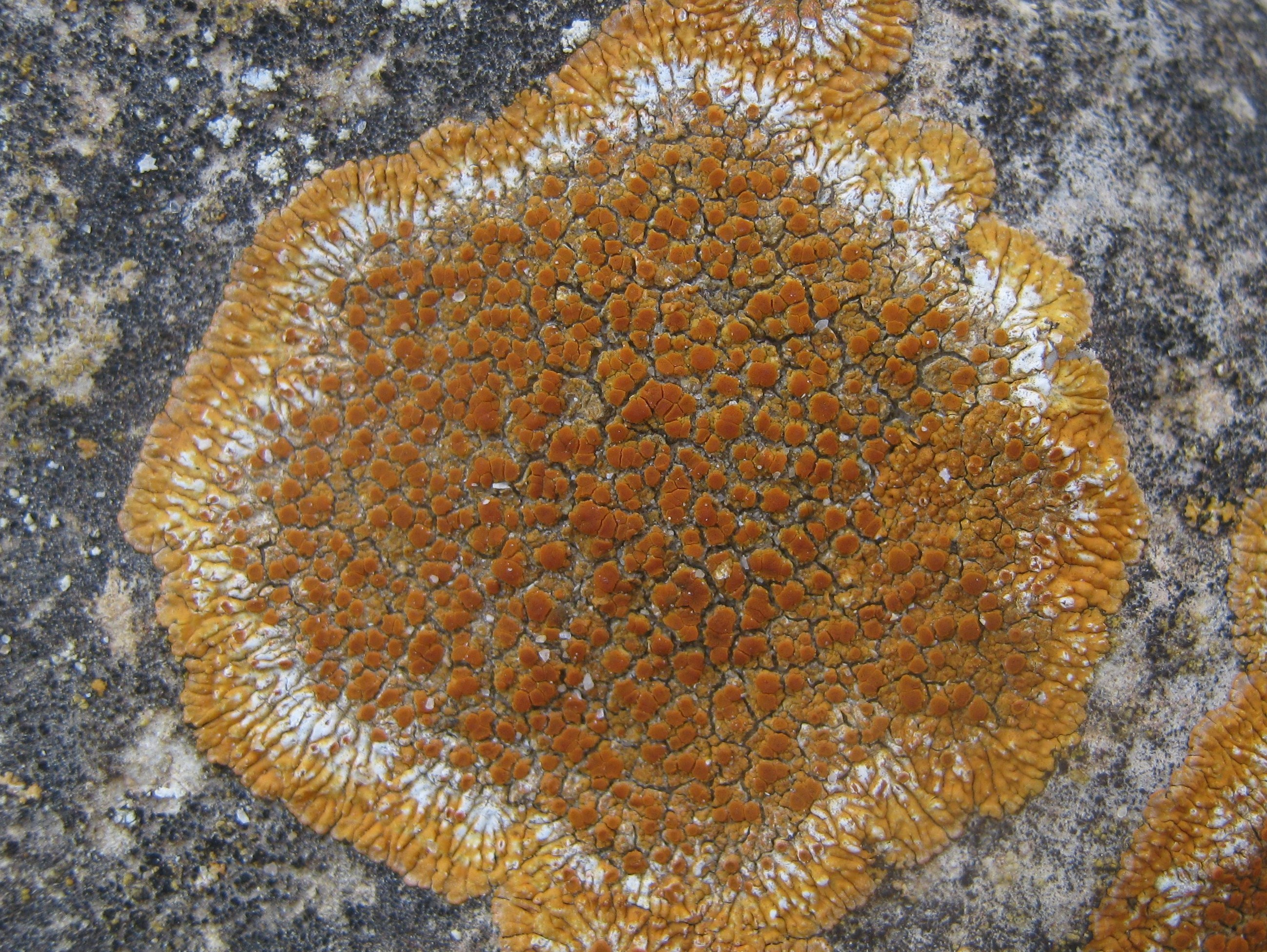

Scientific classification
- Kingdom: Fungi
- Division: Ascomycota
- Class: Lecanoromycetes
- Order: Teloschistales
- Family: Teloschistaceae
- Genus: Variospora
- Species: V. flavescens

Binomial name
- Variospora flavescens (Huds.) Arup, Frödén & Søchting (2013)

Synonyms
- List: Lichen flavescens Huds. (1762); Psora flavescens (Huds.) Baumg. (1790); Parmelia murorum var. flavescens (Huds.) Wallr. (1831); Placodium flavescens (Huds.) A.L.Sm. (1918); Caloplaca flavescens (Huds.) J.R.Laundon (1984); Klauderuiella flavescens (Huds.) S.Y.Kondr. & Hur (2017)

= Variospora flavescens =

Species of lichen-forming fungus

Variospora flavescens is a species of saxicolous (rock-dwelling), crustose lichen in the family Teloschistaceae. It is a common, widely distributed species and has been recorded in Africa, Asia, Europe, and Macaronesia. It forms large, circular, orange patches up to 10 cm or more across on calcareous stone such as limestone and mortar. First described in 1762, the species has been placed in several genera and was transferred to Variospora in 2013.

== Taxonomy ==
The species was first scientifically described by botanist William Hudson in 1762. He placed it in the eponymously named genus Lichen, as was the standard practice in those times, following the example of Carl Linnaeus in his influential 1753 work Species Plantarum. In its long taxonomic history, the species has acquired an extensive list of synonyms. For example, in early Italian literature, it was frequently referred to as Caloplaca murorum. Jack Laundon placed the taxon in the genus Caloplaca in 1984, and it was known by this binomial until 2013, when Ulf Arup, Patrik Frödén, and Ulrik Søchting transferred it to the newly circumscribed genus Variospora.

== Description ==
Variospora flavescens features a placodioid thallus, which forms large, evenly distributed, circular patches measuring 10 cm (4 in) or more in diameter. The lobes of the thallus are closely appressed, with rounded or irregular shapes. Their surface has a matte texture, varying in colour from pale to deep orange.

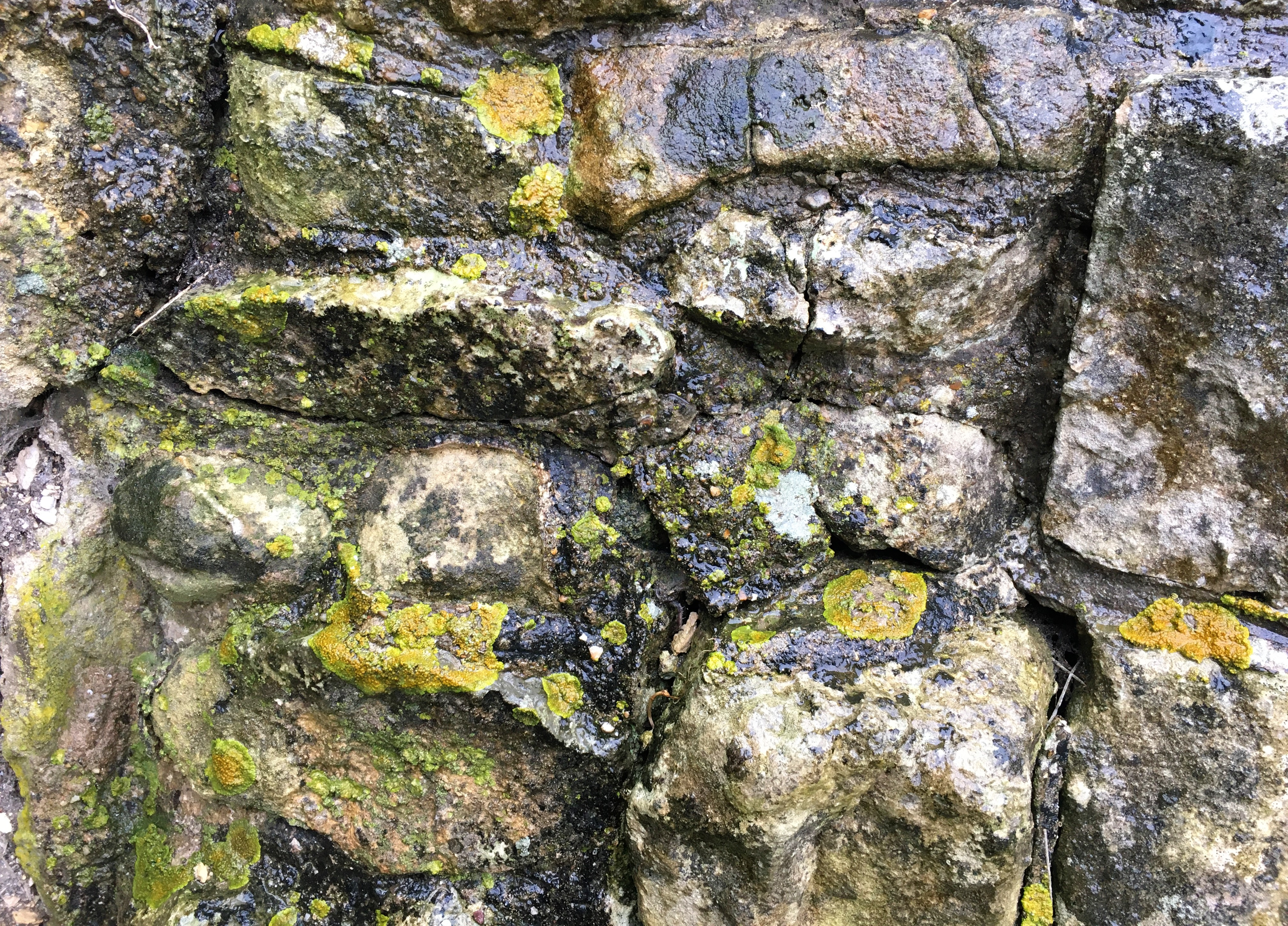
A population of V. flavescens, growing in a variant of the orange crust association (Calogayetum pusillae) on an old castle wall made of hard limestone and concrete

The lobe-ends of this lichen species are not widened but are rounded and convex. They can sometimes appear faintly pruinose, meaning they have a white, waxy, powdery coating. The lobes, which are pleated and sometimes overlapping, are situated close to each other. The centre of the thallus has a closely areolate, uneven texture, composed of occasionally contorted and congested lobes. These central lobes are white and non-pigmented but are spotted with orange apothecia. These apothecia (cup-shaped fruiting bodies) reach up to 1.5 mm in diameter. They are primarily located at the centre of the thallus and are typically abundant and crowded. When young, they are flat but become convex as they age. The thalline margin, or the border of the apothecia, is the same colour as the disc initially but becomes excluded over time. The disc varies in colour from orange to orange-brown. In microscopic cross-section viewed under polarised light, the thallus shows small orange crystalline deposits in the upper cortex (consistent with anthraquinone pigments), while the inner cortex may contain larger, colourless crystals interpreted as calcium oxalate.

The paraphyses (sterile fungal filaments) are slender and range from straight to flexuose, without noticeable swelling at the ends. The lemon-shaped ascospores measure 12–15 by 8–10 μm, and are swollen at the septum. The septum's breadth varies, reaching up to 5 μm wide.

=== Similar species ===
Variospora flavescens belongs to a group of rosette-forming, placodioid lichens that can look very similar in the field, so reliable identification often depends on a few microscopic characters. It has been compared most often with Calogaya pusilla, which can form a similar orange rosette on calcareous stone, but V. flavescens differs in having lemon-shaped ascospores; in C. pusilla the ascospores are ellipsoid. Two other rosette-forming species with lemon-shaped ascospores that may be confused with V. flavescens are Calogaya biatorina and Variospora thallincola. C. biatorina has a distinctly thinner spore septum (about one-quarter of the spore length), whereas the septum in V. flavescens can be broader, reaching about half the length of the ascospore. Variospora thallincola can be separated by a combination of growth form and ecology: it tends to have longer lobes and is associated with supralittoral coastal rocks. Even with these distinctions, visible characters are variable across this polyphyletic set of lobate caloplacoid taxa, making purely morphological identification difficult in some cases.

== Habitat and distribution ==
Variospora flavescens is a saxicolous lichen that grows on calcareous stone, including limestone, mortar, and cement. Rarely it has been found growing on bark, although those cases are typically limited to locations near dusty lime quarries. It is widely distributed, having been recorded in Africa, Asia, Europe, and Macaronesia. It was recorded for the first time in India in 2017. Jan Vondrák and colleagues have suggested that the eastern distributional limit of V. flavescens is in Dagestan, a Caucasian biodiversity hot-spot. In the United Kingdom, although quite common, it is not found in air-polluted areas such as industrial regions in Northern England, nor in the Scottish Lowlands.
