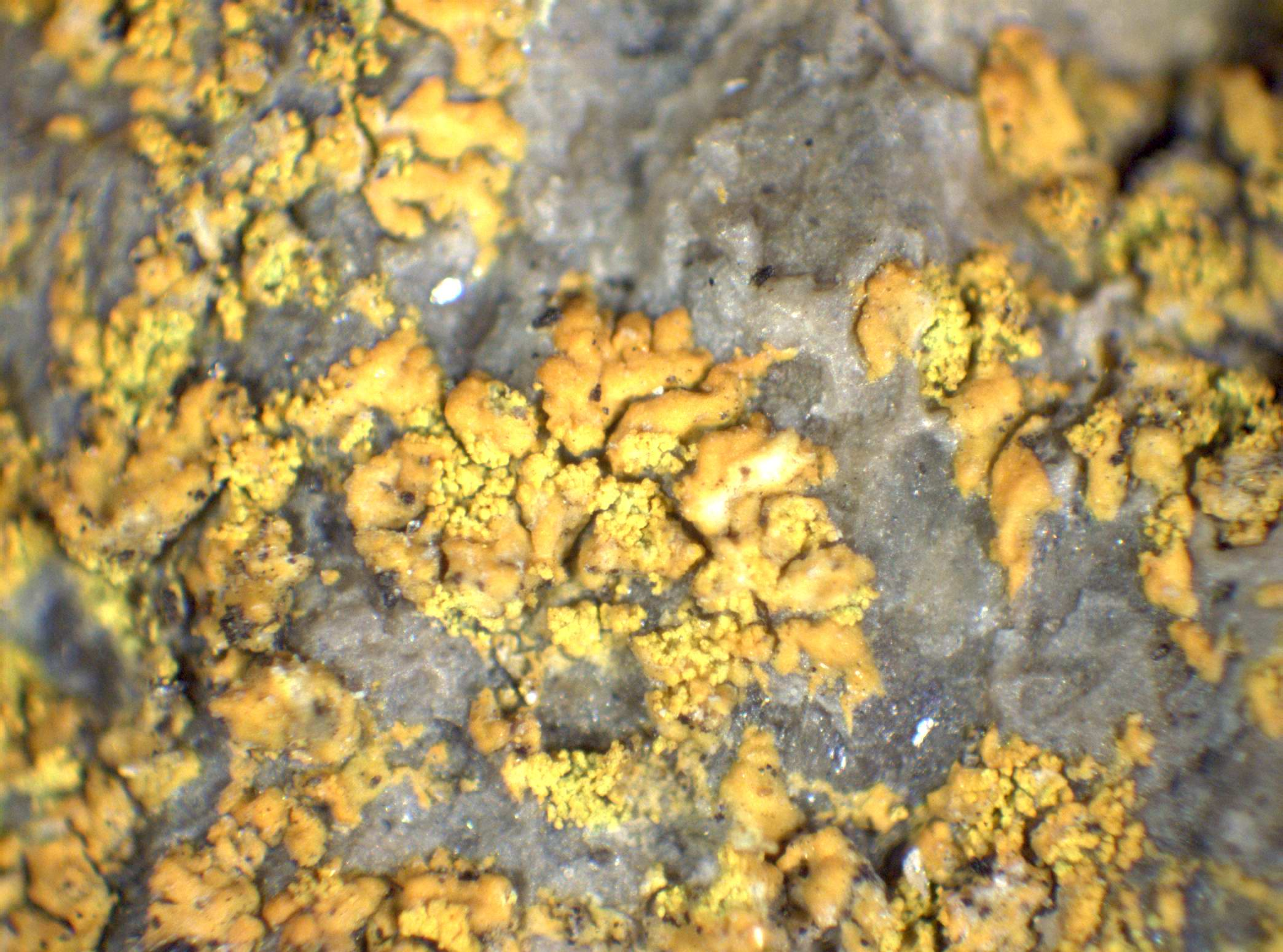

Scientific classification
- Kingdom: Fungi
- Division: Ascomycota
- Class: Lecanoromycetes
- Order: Teloschistales
- Family: Teloschistaceae
- Genus: Leproplaca
- Species: L. obliterans

Binomial name
- Leproplaca obliterans (Nyl.) Arup, Frödén & Søchting (2013)

Synonyms
- List: Placodium obliterans Nyl. (1874); Caloplaca obliterans (Nyl.) Jatta (1900); Caloplaca obliterans (Nyl.) Blomb. & Forssell (1880); Caloplaca obliterans f. obliterans (Nyl.) Blomb. & Forssell (1880); Caloplaca obliterans var. obliterans (Nyl.) Blomb. & Forssell (1880); Gasparrinia cirrochroa f. obliterans (Nyl.) Hav. (1899); Gasparrinia obliterans (Nyl.) Dalla Torre & Sarnth. (1902); Lecanora obliterans (Nyl.) Nyl. (1887); Lecanora obliterans f. obliterans (Nyl.) Nyl. (1887); Physcia cirrochroa var. obliterans (Nyl.) Arnold (1874); Physcia obliterans (Nyl.) Arnold (1881); Placodium cirrochroum f. obliterans (Nyl.) Vain. (1899); Placodium cirrochroum var. obliterans (Nyl.) A.L.Sm. (1918)

= Leproplaca obliterans =

Species of lichen-forming fungus

Leproplaca obliterans is a species of rock-dwelling, crustose lichen-forming fungus in the family Teloschistaceae. First described by William Nylander in 1874, the lichen forms small orange crusts with yellowish orange soralia on shaded, moist siliceous rock, especially overhanging granite. It is found across much of Europe and has also been reported from Southwest Asia, North America, and Australia.

== Taxonomy ==
The species was first formally described by William Nylander in 1874, as Placodium obliterans. In the protologue, Nylander suggested that it might represent a variety of Lecanora cirrochroa, but distinguished it as a smaller lichen with a thallus that was consistently less clearly radiate, its marginal rays often reduced or nearly absent, a colour ranging from ochraceous to deep tawny, and citron-yellow to somewhat sulphur-yellow soredia that were less diffuse than in L. cirrochroa. He added that it appeared to be widespread in northern regions and morphologically consistent.

The taxon has accumulated a complex synonymy as a result of its transfer through several lichen genera over time. After its original publication in Placodium, it was later recombined in Physcia, Lecanora, Gasparrinia, and Caloplaca, with several infraspecific names also published as synonyms, including forms and varieties published under Caloplaca, Lecanora, and Placodium, as well as combinations that treated it as a form or variety of cirrochroa or cirrochroum. In 2013, the species was transferred to Leproplaca, following a large-scale, molecular phylogenetics-informed restructuring of the family Teloschistaceae.

== Description ==
The thallus of Leproplaca obliterans is small and irregular in outline, with pale to dark orange areoles that may be scattered or clustered and are often minutely lobed. A thin basal layer, the hypothallus, the same colour as the thallus, extends into rock cracks in a dendritic pattern. Soralia develop near the centre of the thallus and are concave, eroded, and yellowish orange. Apothecia, when present, are usually concentrated near the centre, partly immersed or sitting flat on the surface (adnate), with orange discs and a thin margin of similar or slightly paler colour; they remain small, reaching about 0.5 mm in diameter.

Leproplaca obliterans can be confused with other sorediate orange members of the Teloschistaceae, especially Flavoplaca citrina and F. flavogranulosa. Compared with F. citrina, it has a more prominent prothallus, often shows more or less distinct marginal lobes, and develops initially round, concave soralia in the centres of the lobes rather than mainly marginal soralia. It differs from F. flavogranulosa in its darker orange thallus, the absence of coarse granules, and the rarity of apothecia and pycnidia. Its prothallus is formed of narrow bundles of hyphae and its soralia are initially round and concave rather than granular and marginal.

== Habitat and distribution ==
Leproplaca obliterans grows on siliceous rock, especially on moist, shaded, overhanging granite surfaces, and has been described as characteristic of Caloplacetum obliterantis, a named lichen community defined around this species on silicate rock. The species has been recorded across much of Europe, especially in boreal, montane, and high-montane parts of the temperate zone, and it has also been reported from Southwest Asia, North America, and Australia.
