= Variospora cancarixiticola =

Scientific classification
- Domain: Eukaryota
- Kingdom: Fungi
- Division: Ascomycota
- Class: Lecanoromycetes
- Order: Teloschistales
- Family: Teloschistaceae
- Genus: Variospora
- Species: V. cancarixiticola

Binomial name
- Variospora cancarixiticola (Nav.-Ros., Egea & Llimona) Arup, Søchting & Frödén (2013)

Synonyms
- Caloplaca cancarixiticola Nav.-Ros., Egea & Llimona (2000)

Species of lichen

Variospora cancarixiticola is a species of saxicolous (rock-dwelling), crustose lichen in the family Teloschistaceae. It is found in southeastern Spain, where it grows on cancarixite, a volcanic rock known only to occur in that country.

== Taxonomy ==
The lichen was first formally described in 2000 as a species of Caloplaca by Pere Navarro-Rosinés, José Egea, and Xavier Llimona. The type specimen was collected from the Sierra de las Cabras between Agramón and Cancárix (province Albacete, Castilla–La Mancha), at an altitude of 671 m (2,201 ft). There, it was found growing on cancarixite, an alkaline igneous rock of the lamproite group found only in southeast Spain. The lichen is only known to occur at the type locality. The species epithet cancarixiticola refers to the unique substrate. The authors noted its similarity to Caloplaca aurea, and considered it to belong to the subgenus Gasparrinia of genus Caloplaca.

The taxon was transferred to the newly circumscribed genus Variospora in 2013, as part of a molecular phylogenetics-directed reorganisation of the family Teloschistaceae.

== Description ==
Variospora cancarixiticola has a crustose thallus with a placodioid growth form, and forms yellowish-orange to reddish-orange rosettes up to 4 cm (1.6 in) in diameter. It produces roundish, zeorine apothecia (i.e., in which the proper exciple is enclosed in the thalline exciple) measuring 0.5–1.7 mm (0.02–0.07 in) in diameter that occur scattered on the thallus surface, or in groups of 2 to 5. Ascospores number eight per ascus, and are colourless, narrowly ellipsoid, and polarilocular (i.e. divided into two compartments), with typical dimensions of 16–22 by 4.5–6 μm.
