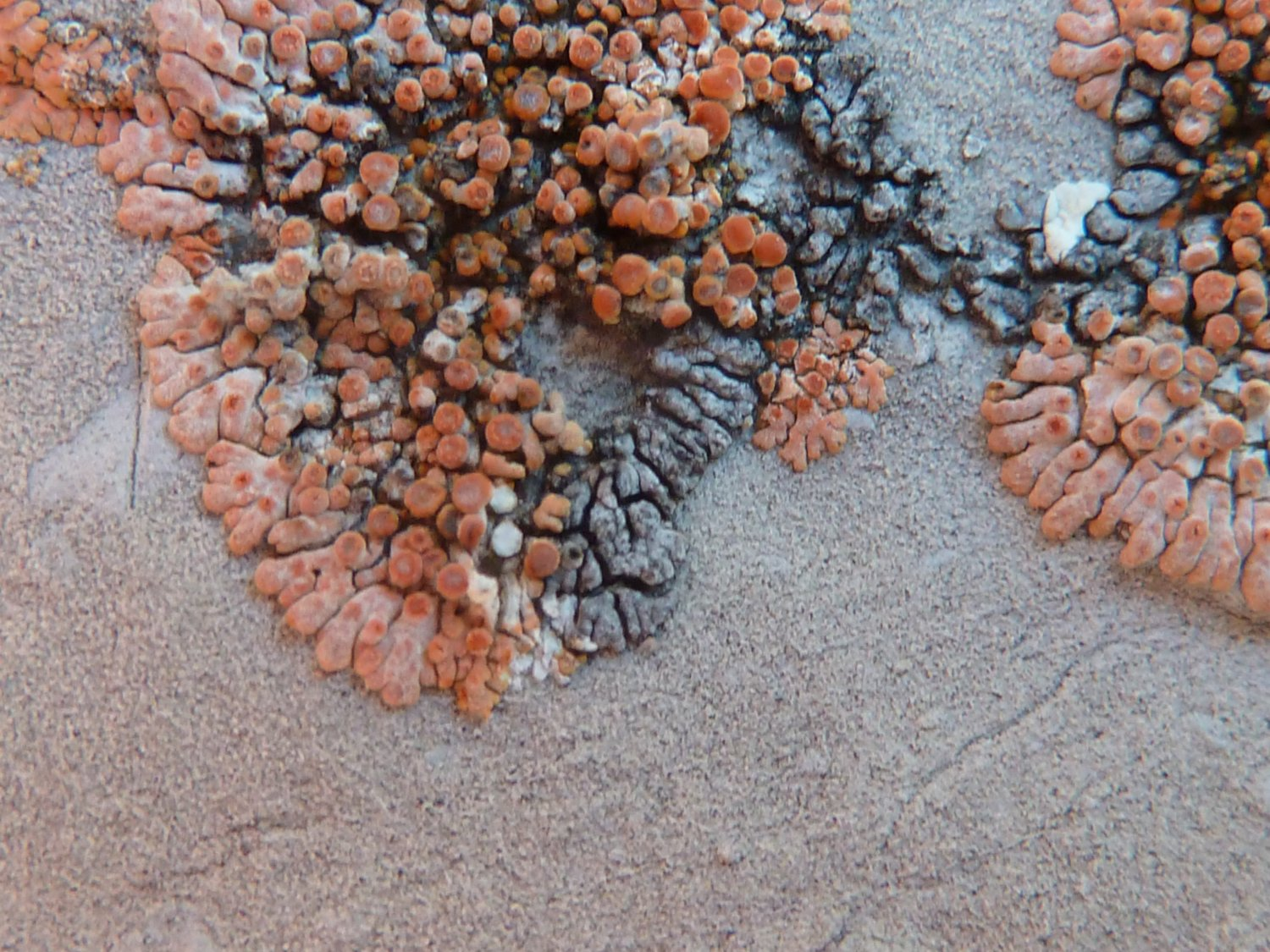
- Calogaya arnoldii (orange thallus) parasitised by the lichenicolous fungus Verrucula arnoldaria (darkened parts)

Scientific classification
- Kingdom: Fungi
- Division: Ascomycota
- Class: Lecanoromycetes
- Order: Teloschistales
- Family: Teloschistaceae
- Genus: Calogaya
- Species: C. arnoldii

Binomial name
- Calogaya arnoldii (Wedd.) Arup, Frödén & Søchting (2013)

Synonyms
- Lecanora arnoldii Wedd. (1876); Physcia arnoldii (Wedd.) Arnold (1881); Caloplaca arnoldii (Wedd.) Zahlbr. ex Ginzb. (1915); Gasparrinia arnoldii (Wedd.) Oxner (1990)

= Calogaya arnoldii =

Species of lichen-forming fungus

Calogaya arnoldii is a species of saxicolous (rock-dwelling), crustose lichen that is common and widespread in Europe and Asia. It is in the family Teloschistaceae. It was first formally described as a new species in 1876 by Hugh Algernon Weddell, as a species of Lecanora. After being transferred to Caloplaca in 1915, it was considered as a member of that genus for nearly a century. Molecular phylogenetic studies showed Caloplaca to be polyphyletic, and it was divided up into several smaller genera in 2013. Calogaya arnoldii was one of eight species transferred to the newly circumscribed Calogaya by Ulf Arup, Patrik Frödén, and Ulrik Søchting. The lichen is part of a species complex with complicated taxonomy, and in which intermediate phenotypes are frequently observed, making it difficult to reliably distinguish them. Calogaya saxicola is one such similar species, and it has often been confused with C, arnoldii in areas where they co-occur, as the differences between them are subtle.

In Nepal, Caloplaca arnoldii has been reported from 3,500 to 4,000 m elevation in a compilation of published records.

Verrucula arnoldaria is a lichenicolous lichen that parasitises Calogaya arnoldii.
