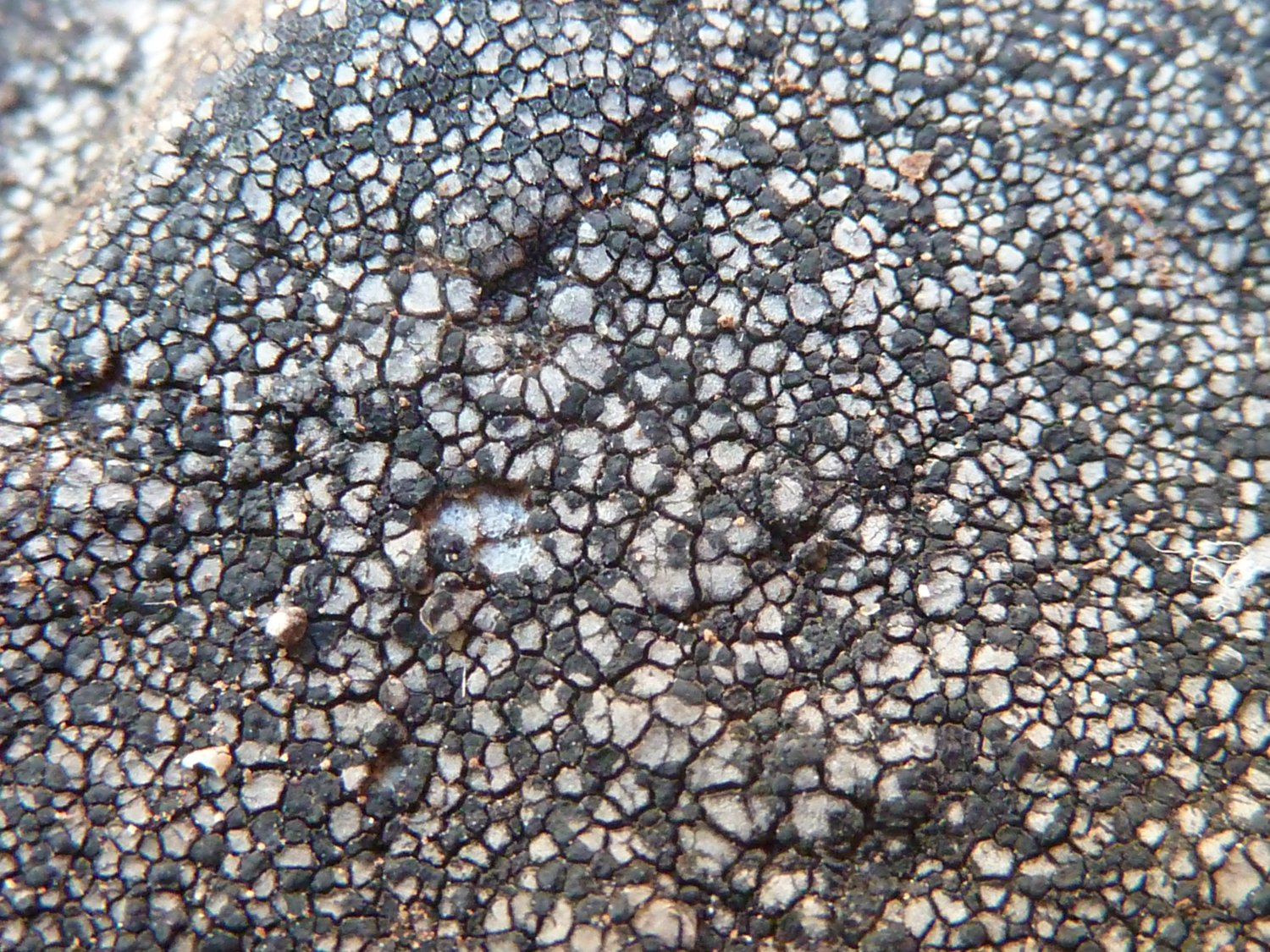
- Verruculopsis lecideoides

Scientific classification
- Kingdom: Fungi
- Division: Ascomycota
- Class: Eurotiomycetes
- Order: Verrucariales
- Family: Verrucariaceae
- Genus: Verruculopsis; Gueidan, Nav.-Ros. & Cl.Roux (2007)

Type species
- Verruculopsis poeltiana (Clauzade & Cl.Roux) Gueidan, Nav.-Ros. & Cl.Roux (2007)

Species
- V. beltraminiana V. flavescentaria V. irrubescentis V. lecideoides V. poeltiana

= Verruculopsis =

Genus of lichens

Verruculopsis is a genus of saxicolous (rock-dwelling), crustose lichens in the family Verrucariaceae. The genus was established in 2007 when DNA studies revealed that several species previously classified elsewhere actually formed their own distinct evolutionary group. Most species in the genus live as parasites on bright orange crustose lichens, though one species grows independently on rock surfaces without needing a host.

== Taxonomy ==
Verruculopsis was circumscribed as a new genus in 2007 by Cécile Gueidan, Pere Navarro-Rosinés, and Claude Roux, while disentangling the complex surrounding "Verrucaria" helveticorum. Their protologue formally introduced Verruculopsis with Verruculopsis poeltiana (originally Verrucaria poeltiana, 1984) designated as the type species. ITS-rDNA phylogenetic analysis presented in the same 2007 study demonstrated that the three placodioid parasites now placed in Verruculopsis—V. poeltiana, V. flavescentaria and V. irrubescentis—form a strongly supported clade that is sister to the rock-inhabiting genus Placopyrenium, not to Verrucula. This molecular evidence, together with their shared suite of characters (perithecial walls that grade from pale brown at the base to dark brown above, an iodine-negative medulla, and an obligate parasitism on anthraquinone-rich Caloplaca species or occasionally Rusavskia elegans), showed that Verrucula sensu lato was polyphyletic and justified recognition of Verruculopsis as a separate, monophyletic genus. A single free-living, saxicolous species, V. lecideoides, is interpreted as a non-parasitic remnant of the same lineage.

== Description ==
Verruculopsis forms thin crusts that break into tiny blocks or scale-like pieces (an areolate to squamulose thallus) coloured grey to brown. The outer skin (cortex) is only a few cells thick and built from brown-walled cells; these are usually covered by a faint, powdery epinecral layer of dead cell remnants that gives the surface a matt appearance. Beneath lies a loose mesh of threads (medulla) that shows no blue reaction with iodine (recorded as I–). The reproductive structures are flask-shaped perithecia that sit partly buried in the thallus or nestle between the tiny areoles. Their wall (exciple) is strongly pigmented: dark brown in the upper half but fading to pale brown below, and they may carry an extra protective cap (involucrellum) or lack it altogether.

Inside each perithecium the spore sacs (asci) are club-shaped and contain eight colourless, one-celled ascospores that are either ellipsoid or gently cylindrical. Asexual spores are produced in minute, immersed pycnidia of the Dermatocarpon-type; these release short rod-shaped (bacilliform) conidia that are straight or only slightly curved. Verruculopsis grows on rock, sometimes as an independent crust and sometimes starting life as a parasite on bright orange, anthraquinone-rich species of the former Caloplaca complex. Although it looks much like Verrucula, it differs in its two-toned perithecial wall, consistently iodine-negative medulla, and DNA evidence that allies it with Placopyrenium rather than with Verrucula.

== Species ==
As of June 2025, five species are accepted in Verruculopsis:

- Verruculopsis beltraminiana (A.Massal.) Cl.Roux (2020)
- Verruculopsis flavescentaria Gueidan, Nav.-Ros. & Cl.Roux (2007)
- Verruculopsis irrubescentis (Ménard & Cl.Roux) Gueidan, Nav.-Ros. & Cl.Roux (2007)
- Verruculopsis lecideoides (A.Massal.) Gueidan & Cl.Roux (2007)
- Verruculopsis poeltiana (Clauzade & Cl.Roux) Gueidan, Nav.-Ros. & Cl.Roux (2007)
