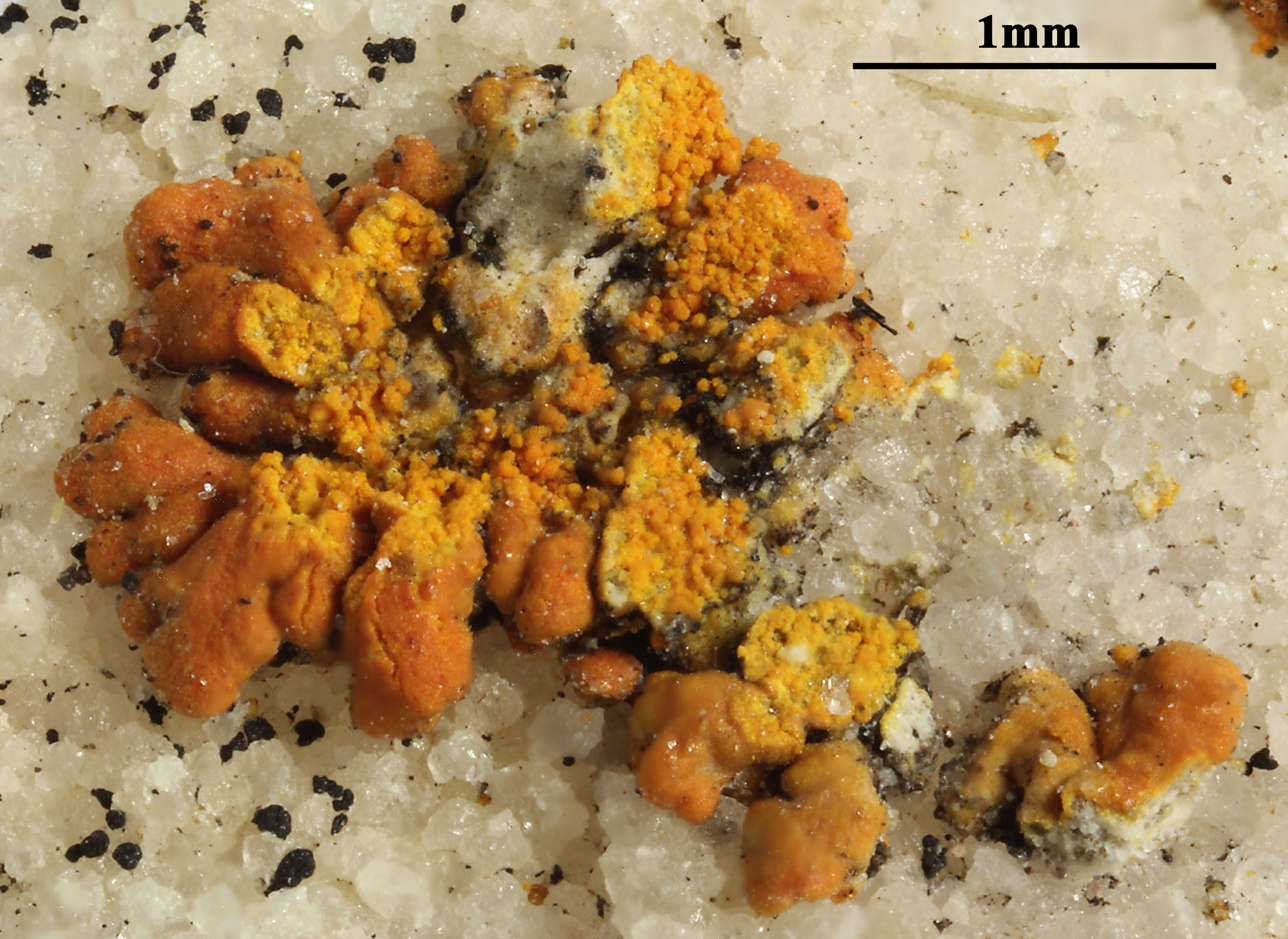

Scientific classification
- Kingdom: Fungi
- Division: Ascomycota
- Class: Lecanoromycetes
- Order: Teloschistales
- Family: Teloschistaceae
- Genus: Leproplaca
- Species: L. proteus

Binomial name
- Leproplaca proteus (Poelt) Arup, Frödén & Søchting (2013)

Synonyms
- Caloplaca proteus Poelt (1953); Gasparrinia proteus (Poelt) Oxner (1990)

= Leproplaca proteus =

Species of lichen-forming fungus

Leproplaca proteus is a species of rock-dwelling, crustose lichen-forming fungus in the family Teloschistaceae. First described by Josef Poelt in 1953 from the Bavarian Alps, the lichen forms small orange crusts on shaded limestone and dolomite, with a radiating pattern of narrow lobes that break down into granular soredia toward the centre. It is known mainly from mountain districts across the Alps and the Carpathian Mountains.

== Taxonomy ==
Leproplaca proteus was originally described by Josef Poelt in 1953 as Caloplaca proteus, based on material he collected from a small limestone cliff in the Bavarian Alps, below the Großkaralm on the ascent from Ettal to the Notkarspitze at about 1,500 m elevation. The type was deposited in the Botanische Staatssammlung München. In the protologue, Poelt treated the species as a lichen with an unusually variable outward form and reviewed a tangled earlier naming history, drawing together records that had previously been placed under several names in Physcia, Placodium, and Caloplaca.

Poelt regarded the species as especially distinctive because sorediate growth and apothecium production could alternate, so that different parts or stages of the thallus could look rather unlike one another. He separated it from the coarser Caloplaca cirrochroa, which he said had broader lobes and rougher sorediate material, and contrasted it with what he regarded as true C. obliterans, a separate rock-dwelling species of siliceous substrates with less distinct lobes, yellower soredia, and a different pattern of apothecium development. He also noted that C. proteus was known only from calcareous substrates, usually on shaded to semi-shaded vertical or overhanging rock, and compared it with C. cirrochroa f. fulva, which he considered similar in some respects but still in need of further taxonomic study.

Alfred Oxner thought the species was more appropriately placed in Gasparrinia, and transferred it to that genus in 1990. It was again reclassified in the genus Leproplaca in 2013, following a molecular phylogenetics-informed restructuring of the family Teloschistaceae.

== Description ==
Leproplaca proteus has a well-developed thallus that lies closely pressed against the rock and is arranged in a conspicuously radiating pattern of small, scale-like squamules or short lobes. A visible prothallus is absent. Its appearance is unusually variable because the inner parts of the thallus often break down into confluent soralia, while the outer lobes remain narrow, usually about 0.5–1 mm long and 0.2–0.5 mm wide, and are commonly forked at the tips. The species lacks isidia. The soralia are granular and orange. Areas within the sorediate parts often become pale and begin to die back, and the apothecia usually develop from these ageing patches. These fruiting bodies are small, about 0.12–0.15 mm across, with flat to slightly convex discs that are orange to reddish and surrounded by a rather thick margin, which may become uneven or slightly depressed with age.

The cortex is developed mainly on the upper and lateral parts of the lobes and is about 30 μm thick, with abundant yellow-orange pigment granules. Beneath it, the medulla is made of more loosely woven hyphae, while the algal cells are scattered rather than arranged in a sharply defined layer. In section, the apothecial margin resembles the thallus, the hymenium is 60–80 μm tall, and the asci contain eight spores measuring 9–15 by 5–7 μm, with a septum up to 6 μm thick. Poelt also reported pycnidia about 70–80 μm in diameter and narrow conidia 3–6 by 0.8–1 μm. Chemically, the medulla is iodine-negative, whereas the hymenium stains an intense blue with iodine, and the orange pigment granules dissolve in potassium hydroxide solution (K) with a crimson reaction.

== Habitat and distribution ==
At the time of its description, Leproplaca proteus was reported from sheltered calcareous rock in European mountain districts. Poelt described it as growing on partly shaded to shaded, more or less vertical or overhanging faces of limestone and dolomite, and perhaps occasionally on calcareous schist, from low elevations to about 2,000 m or slightly higher. He said it tended to establish on relatively hard rock surfaces that were beginning to weather, often among other crustose lichens, and regarded it as a pioneer species. The localities he assembled were concentrated in the Alps, from Bavaria through Tyrol and South Tyrol to Lombardy, with outlying records from the Küstenland region and the Carpathians.

== Ecology ==
Weddellomyces protearius and Lichenochora xanthoriae are two lichenicolous (lichen-dwelling) fungi that have been recorded parasitizing Leproplaca proteus in Germany and Austria.
