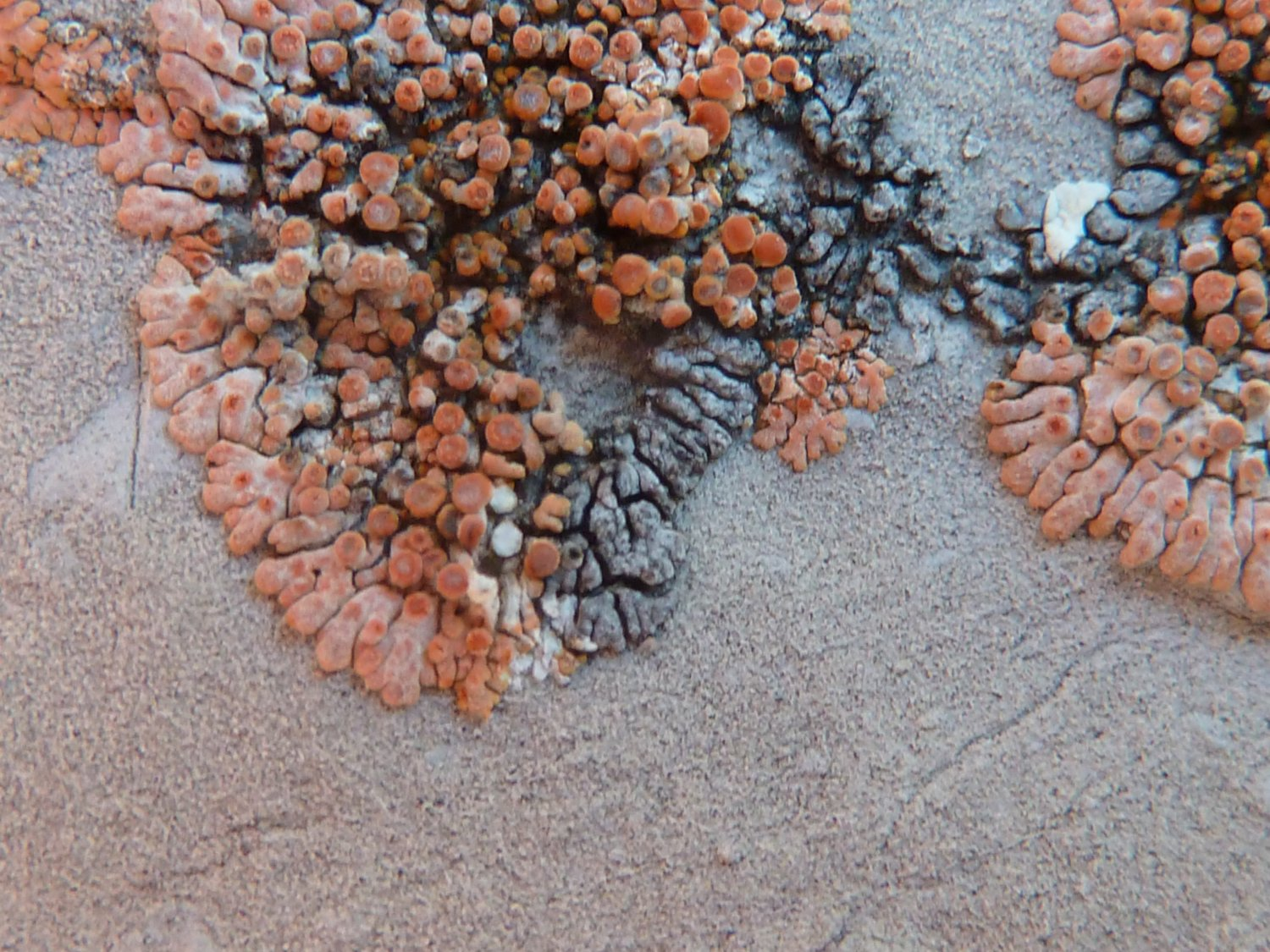
- Verrucula arnoldaria (darkened parts of thallus) growing on Calogaya arnoldii

Scientific classification
- Domain: Eukaryota
- Kingdom: Fungi
- Division: Ascomycota
- Class: Eurotiomycetes
- Order: Verrucariales
- Family: Verrucariaceae
- Genus: Verrucula
- Species: V. arnoldaria

Binomial name
- Verrucula arnoldaria Nav.-Ros. & Cl.Roux (2007)

= Verrucula arnoldaria =

Species of lichen

Verrucula arnoldaria is a rare species of lichenicolous (lichen-dwelling) lichen in the family Verrucariaceae. It grows parasitically on the thallus of the rock-dwelling, crustose lichen Calogaya arnoldii. The known distribution of V. arnoldaria is limited to southern France and northeastern Spain.

== Taxonomy ==
The species was formally described as new to science in 2007 by the lichenologists Père Navarro-Rosinés and Claude Roux, from specimens collected in Vaucluse, France. It has also been recorded from Italy. The lichen has a thick brownish-grey, areolate thallus that roughly maintains the shape of its underlying host. The thallus is covered with a crystalline pruina. It makes ellipsoid spores that measure up to about 15 μm long. Its host grows on calciferous rocks and calciferous schists.

== Description ==
The lichen forms a thallus that is areolate or verrucose-areolate, meaning it consists of small, separate or clustered patches (areoles) that somewhat preserve the appearance of its host. The areoles measure 0.1–0.8 mm (occasionally up to 1 mm) across, have flat surfaces initially but develop into convex, very convex, or even somewhat globular structures as they mature. They are typically 0.1–0.4 mm thick and covered with a distinctive whitish-grey crystalline powdery coating (pruina). The margins and undersides of the areoles range in colour from light brown to blackish.

Under microscopic examination, the lichen shows a layered structure. The pseudocortex (outer protective layer) consists of a pigmented layer 10–12 μm thick made up of 1–2 layers of cells with very light to light brown walls, topped by a 5–11 μm thick layer of dead cells that is occasionally absent in places. This is covered by a layer of thick crystals that may also be absent in some areas. The algal layer, containing photosynthetic partner cells, is 55–80 μm thick with algal cells measuring (7)8–15.5 μm in diameter. The medulla (inner layer) does not react with iodine (J–), measures 100–300 μm thick, and consists of filamentous hyphae (fungal threads) that are generally not very dense, with abundant large crystals and occasionally abundant brown necrotic parts of the host.

The reproductive structures (ascomata or "fruiting bodies") measure approximately 200–240 μm in diameter and are either completely embedded within the thallus or slightly protruding when fully developed. They appear in groups of 1–4 within the areoles and are visible from above due to their blackish-brown or black periostiolar area (the area surrounding the opening of the fruiting body). The exciple (the outer wall of the fruiting body) is 25–35 μm thick at the base and colourless, with only the external periostiolar part being brown. The pseudoparaphyses (sterile filaments between the asci) measure 15–30 by 1.5–3 μm. The asci (spore-producing structures) are 42–60 by 15–20 μm in size.

The spores are ellipsoid, measuring 10–11.4–13 by 6.5–6.9–7.5 μm, with a length-to-width ratio of 1.4–1.7–2.0. The pycnidia (asexual reproductive structures) reach up to 200 by 70 μm in diameter, have multiple chambers, are completely embedded in the thallus, and have completely colourless walls. The conidia (asexual spores) are bacilliform (rod-shaped), measuring 5.5–6.5 by 1–1.5 μm.

== Habitat, distribution, and ecology ==
Verrucula arnoldaria has specific habitat preferences, typically growing on calcareous rock formations. It favours surfaces that are sheltered from direct rainfall and water runoff, particularly on overhanging rock faces (subcorvels). The species shows a preference for compact limestone and dolomitic substrates. In the documented locations, it has been found on various types of calcareous rock including Burdigalian molasse (a type of sandstone with calcareous cement), dolomitic limestone, and Upper Jurassic limestone (specifically in the Tithonian facies). The lichen often grows on rock faces with specific orientations, frequently facing north, northeast, east, or south-southeast, and typically on very steep surfaces with inclinations of 90–110° (vertical to slightly overhanging).

The known distribution of Verrucula arnoldaria is limited to southern France and northeastern Spain. In France, specimens have been collected from multiple locations in Provence, including sites in the departments of Vaucluse, Bouches-du-Rhône, as well as from Languedoc and Saône-et-Loire in east-central France. In Spain, the species has been documented in Catalonia, specifically in the province of Tarragona (Serra de Prades). The altitudinal range of the documented specimens varies from approximately 400 to 900 metres above sea level. This distribution pattern suggests that Verrucula arnoldaria may be primarily a Mediterranean species.

Verrucula arnoldaria is a lichenicolous fungus, meaning it lives parasitically on another lichen species. Specifically, it parasitizes Calogaya arnoldii, which serves as its host or "loĝato" (as described in the original text). The relationship appears to be obligate, with V. arnoldaria being exclusively found growing on this particular host species.
