= Variospora aegaea =

Scientific classification
- Kingdom: Fungi
- Division: Ascomycota
- Class: Lecanoromycetes
- Order: Teloschistales
- Family: Teloschistaceae
- Genus: Variospora
- Species: V. aegaea

Binomial name
- Variospora aegaea (Sipman) Arup, Frödén & Søchting (2013)

Synonyms
- Caloplaca aegaea Sipman (2002)

Species of lichen-forming fungus

Variospora aegaea is a species of saxicolous (rock-dwelling), crustose lichen in the family Teloschistaceae. First identified from Greek islands in the Aegean Sea (after which it is named), and has since been recorded in Italy and Spain.

== Taxonomy ==
The lichen was formally described as a new species in 2002 in Dutch lichenologist Harrie Sipman. The type specimen was collected from Paros (in the Cyclades archipelago), at an altitude of 150–200 m (490–660 ft). There the lichen was found growing on west- and south-facing schistose rock outcrops. The lichen was named for its Greek distribution, as it was first recorded from Paros, Antiparos, and Kalymnos, which are Greek islands in the Aegean Sea. It was transferred to the newly circumscribed genus Variospora in 2013 following a molecular phylogenetic study of the family Teloschistaceae.

== Description ==
Variospora aegaea has a yellowish to brownish-orange thallus that is placodioid with an areolate centre and a lobed margin. The individuals areoles are convex and measure about 0.2–0.4 mm wide. The lobes on the margin are about 1–1.5 mm long and 0.2–0.3 mm wide, and have a loose attachment to its substrate;. The width of the upper cortex ranges between 20 and 60 μm. The algal layer (containing the photobiont partner), about 100 μm thick, contains scattered bundles of periclinal hyphae. Apothecia are frequent on the thallus surface; they are rounded, typically measuring 0.4–0.8 μm in diameter. They have a distinct margin (about 0.1 mm wide), and a somewhat darker disc. The ascospores, which number 8 per ascus, are hyaline, and polarilocular (divided into two polar components). They initially have an ellipsoid shape before widening with a widened septum, reaching dimensions of 10–15 by 9–11 μm, with a septum that is 4–5 μm thick.

== Habitat and distribution ==
Variospora aegaea occurs mostly on the horizontal faces of rocks and boulders at altitudes between 5 and 150 m (16 and 492 ft), usually at locations not far from the sea. It has been found in Paros, Antiparos and Kalimnos in the Aegean Sea, as well as Sardinia, Italy, and in southeastern Spain.
