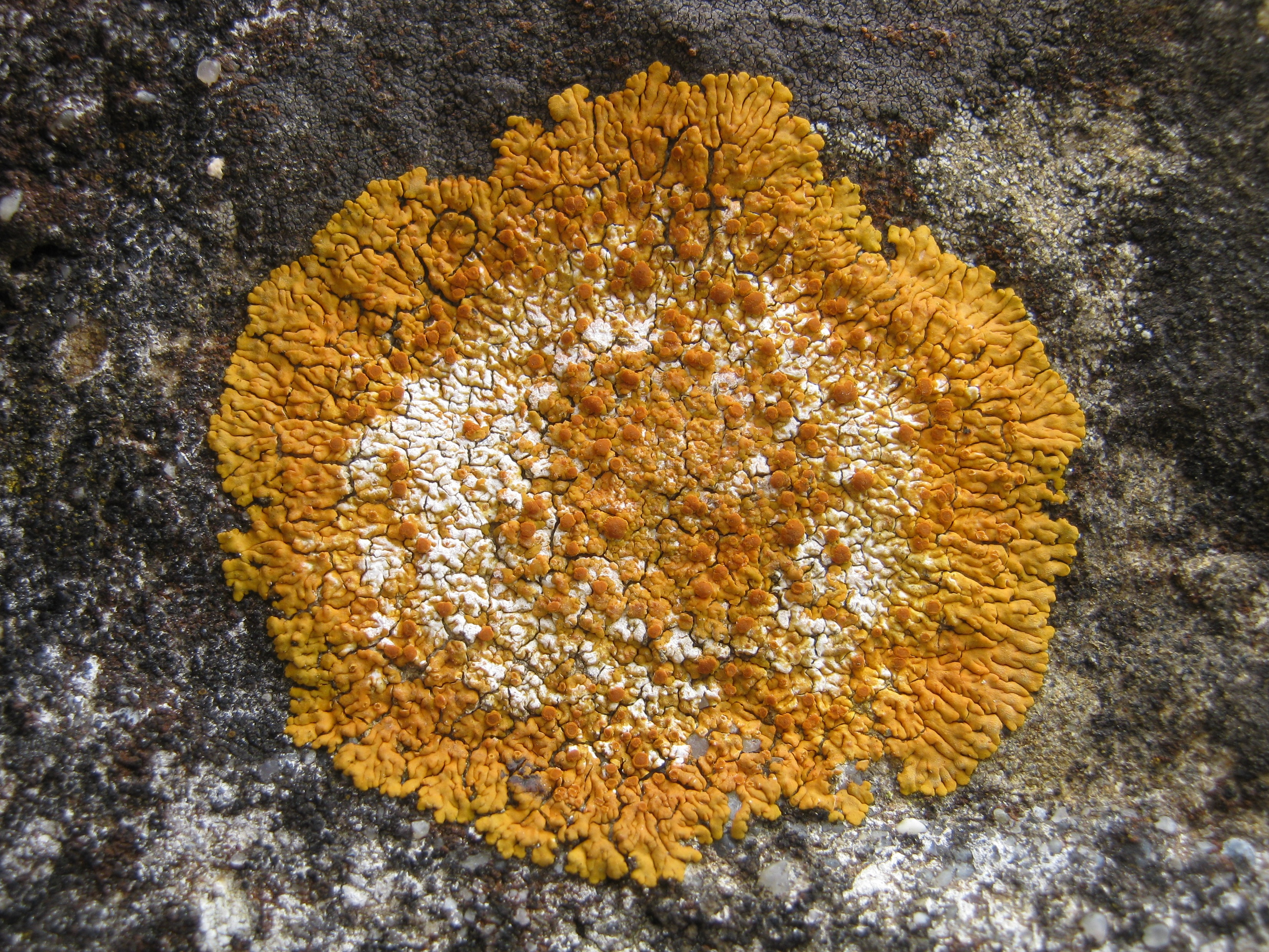
- Variospora flavescens

Scientific classification
- Domain: Eukaryota
- Kingdom: Fungi
- Division: Ascomycota
- Class: Lecanoromycetes
- Order: Teloschistales
- Family: Teloschistaceae
- Genus: Variospora; Arup, Søchting & Frödén (2013)

Type species
- Variospora velana (A.Massal.) Arup, Søchting & Frödén (2013)

Synonyms
- Klauderuiella S.Y.Kondr. & Hur (2017)

= Variospora =

Genus of lichen-forming fungi

Variospora is a genus of crustose lichens belonging to the family Teloschistaceae. The genus was established in 2013 when DNA studies revealed that many species previously grouped under the traditional large genus Caloplaca actually belonged to distinct evolutionary lineages. These bright orange lichens are distinguished by their variable ascospore shapes—which can be lemon-shaped, hourglass-shaped, or simply divided by a straight partition—and their distinctive purple reaction when tested with potassium hydroxide solution.

== Taxonomy ==
Variospora was circumscribed in 2013 by Ulf Arup, Ulrik Søchting, and Patrik Frödén after a multilocus DNA study disentangled the polyphyletic jumble that had collected under the traditional genus Caloplaca. Within the subfamily Caloplacoideae their phylogeny recovered two primary lineages: one largely coinciding with the old, anthraquinone-free concept of Pyrenodesmia and a second, pigment-rich lineage that split into several well-supported subclades. The branch uniting the former Caloplaca velana and aurantia groups emerged as a coherent, strongly supported clade and was recognised as the new genus Variospora. The name refers to the striking diversity in ascospore form found across its members—spores may be citriform (lemon-shaped with a swollen mid-septum), sand glass-shaped, or merely divided by a short straight septum—yet molecular data show them to share a common ancestor.

Phylogenetically, Variospora sits close to Seirophora, but it differs in having a strictly crustose to placodioid thallus suffused with orange anthraquinone pigments, whereas Seirophora species are somewhat fruticose in form and usually lack such colouring. The genus also overlaps morphologically with Flavoplaca and Calogaya, yet those lineages never produce the citriform spores so characteristic of many Variospora species. Even among the lobate taxa—such as V. australis and V. cancarixiticola—molecular markers place them firmly inside the Variospora clade rather than alongside superficially similar grey-thallus genera. Chemistry supports these distinctions: all known species fall into chemosyndrome A or A3, reacting K+ (purple) due to their anthraquinone arsenal.

The genus is centred in Europe but several species extend into North America. Arup and colleagues transferred a dozen well-known names, including V. velana (the type species), V. aurantia, V. flavescens and V. macrocarpa, and designated new combinations for additional lobate and crustose taxa.

In 2017, Sergey Kondratyuk and Jae-Seoun Hur demonstrated that the three Variospora species with placodioid thalli form a strongly supported monophyletic subclade and proposed transferring them to a separate genus, Klauderuiella. The suggestion has not been adopted by other lichenologists; Klauderuiella is now treated as a taxonomic synonym of Variospora. As Paul Cannon and co-authors have observed, "Variospora in Arup et al.'s concept is also monophyletic and there does not seem to be a strong case to establish yet another genus within the Teloschistaceae".

== Description ==
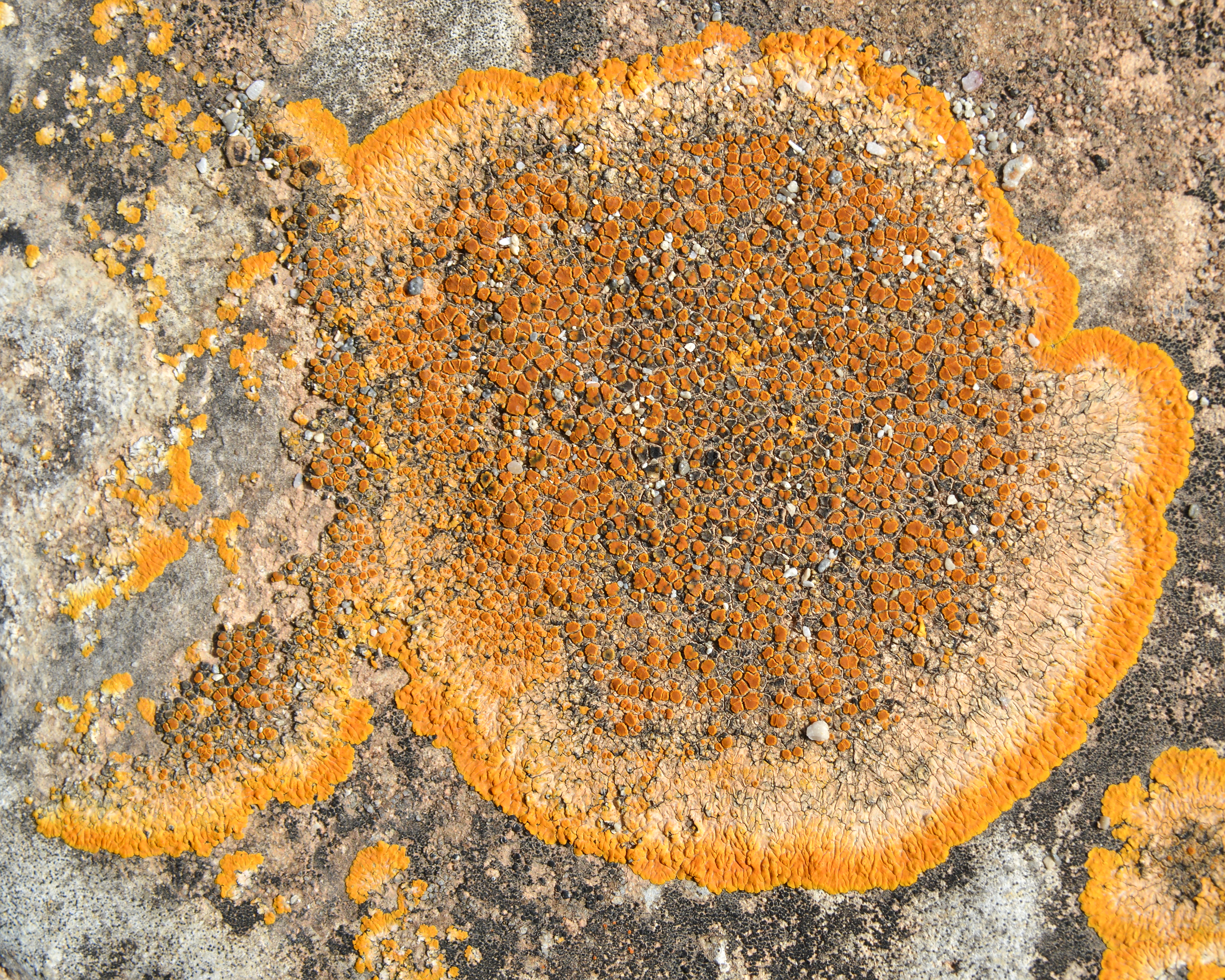
Variospora aurantia, Spain

Variospora species form showy, crust-like lichens whose upper surface (the thallus) spreads out in a bright yellow-orange to deep orange sheet. Around the rim the thallus develops overlapping lobes that lie flat or rise in gentle domes; because these lobes fuse tightly they are placodioid, meaning lobed at the edge but firmly crustose in the centre. The outer ends of the lobes are rounded and may carry a fine, frost-like bloom (pruina), while the older central region breaks into coarse, uneven blocks (areoles). The genus does not produce vegetative propagules such as soredia or isidia, so it relies on sexual and asexual spores for dispersal.

Most of the sexual fruiting bodies (apothecia) cluster in the thallus centre. They begin with a clear yellow-orange rim derived from the thallus itself; this thalline margin can persist or, in older specimens, become overgrown and disappear. The exposed disc starts flat but often swells into a low dome and turns orange-brown with age. Inside each apothecium slender, unbranched paraphyses thread the hymenial tissue; their tips are scarcely thickened, a detail that helps in microscopic identification. The spore sacs (asci) contain eight ascospores apiece. These spores are divided into two chambers by a central wall and bulge slightly at the septum, giving many spores a lemon-like outline. The wall's thickness is unusually variable within the genus, a feature alluded to by the name Variospora ("variable spore"). Asexual reproduction occurs in tiny orange pycnidia that dot the thallus; these flask-shaped bodies release short rod- to oval-shaped conidia. Chemically, both thallus and apothecia turn purple when a drop of potassium hydroxide solution (the standard K test) is applied, reflecting the presence of anthraquinone pigments typical of many vividly coloured coastal and arid-zone lichens.

== Species ==
As of June 2025, Species Fungorum (in the Catalogue of Life) accept 18 species of Variospora:

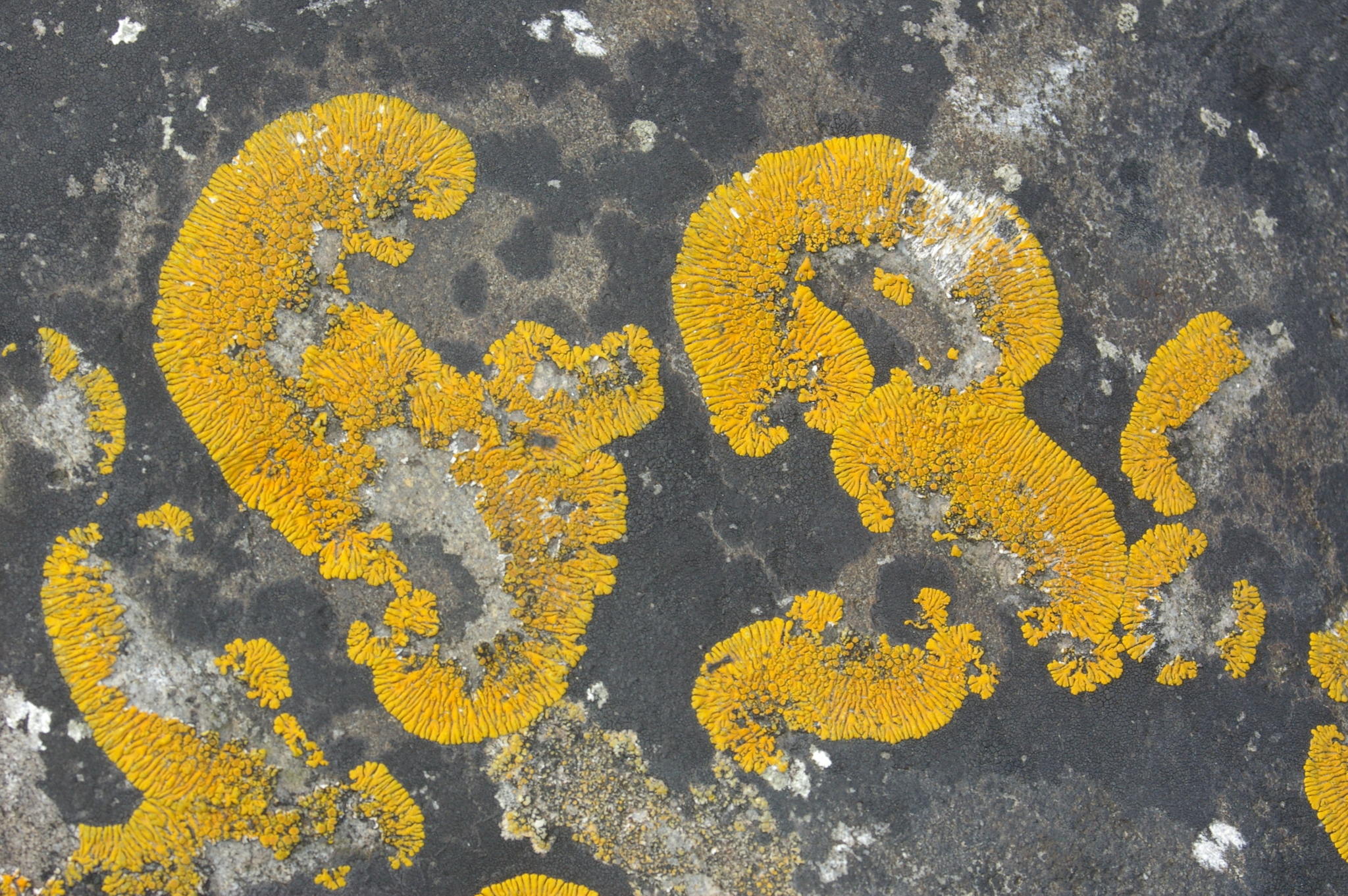
Variospora thallincola, UK

- Variospora aegaea (Sipman) Arup, Frödén & Søchting (2013)
- Variospora aurantia (Pers.) Arup, Frödén & Søchting (2013)
- Variospora australis (Arnold) Arup, Søchting & Frödén (2013)
- Variospora cancarixiticola (Nav.-Ros., Egea & Llimona) Arup, Søchting & Frödén (2013)
- Variospora dolomiticola (Zahlbr.) Arup, Søchting & Frödén (2013)
- Variospora epierodens (Cl.Roux & M. Bertrand) Cl.Roux & M. Bertrand (2021)
- Variospora erythrina (Müll.Arg.) Arup, Frödén & Søchting (2013)
- Variospora flavescens (Huds.) Arup, Frödén & Søchting (2013)
- Variospora fuerteventurae (van den Boom & Etayo) van den Boom & Etayo (2017)
- Variospora glomerata (Arup) Arup, Søchting & Frödén (2013)
- Variospora latzelii (Servít) S.Y.Kondr. (2017)
- Variospora macrocarpa (Anzi) Arup, Søchting & Frödén (2013)
- Variospora paulii (Poelt) Arup, Søchting & Frödén (2013)
- Variospora sororicida (M.Steiner & Poelt) Vondrák (2019)
- Variospora thallincola (Wedd.) Arup, Frödén & Søchting (2013)
- Variospora velana (A.Massal.) Arup, Søchting & Frödén (2013)
