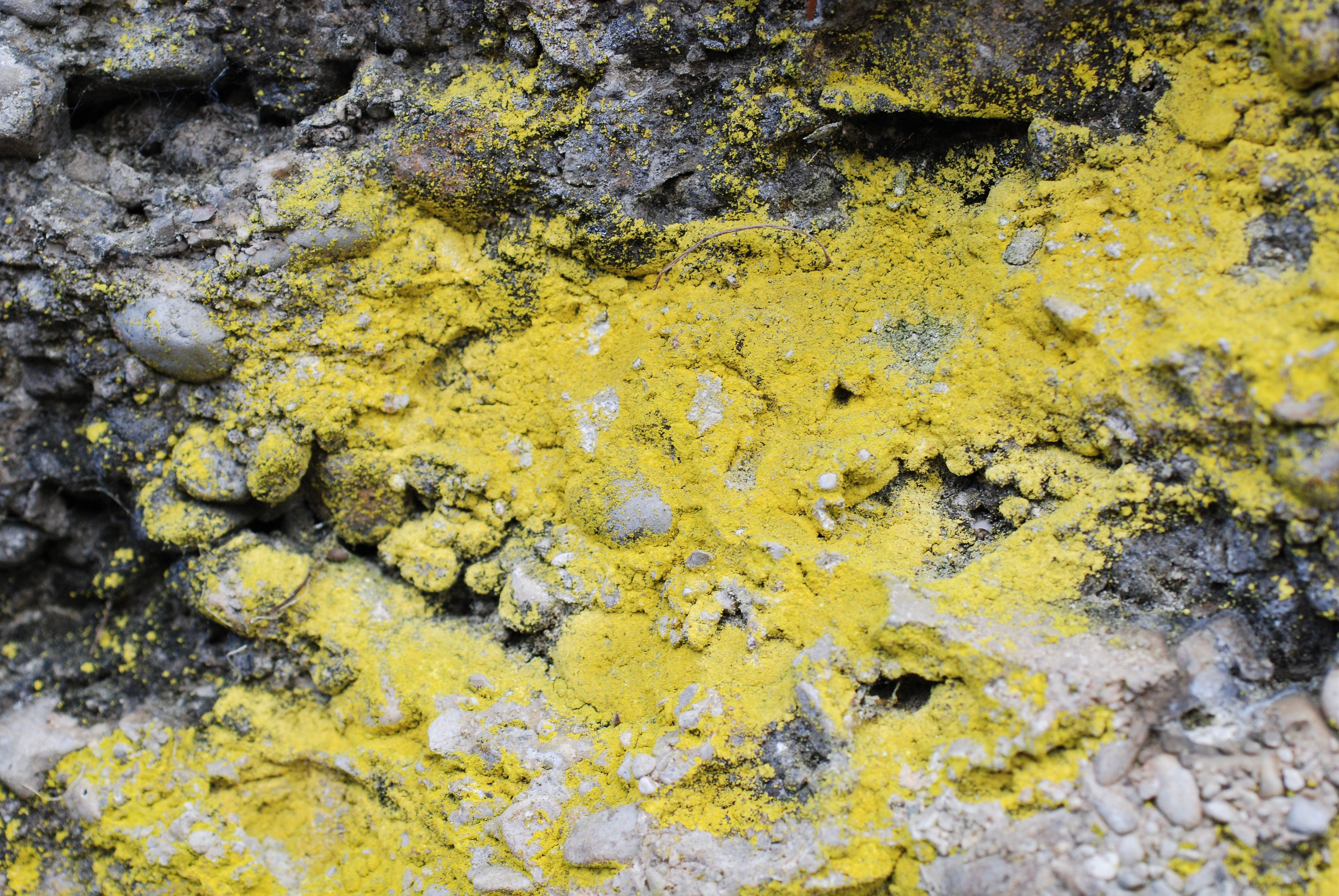
- Leproplaca chrysodeta

Scientific classification
- Kingdom: Fungi
- Division: Ascomycota
- Class: Lecanoromycetes
- Order: Teloschistales
- Family: Teloschistaceae
- Genus: Leproplaca (Nyl.) Hue ex J.R.Laundon (1974)

Synonyms
- Lecanora subgen. Leproplaca Nyl. (1883)

= Leproplaca =

Genus of lichen-forming fungi

Leproplaca is a genus of lichen-forming fungi in the family Teloschistaceae. The genus was originally proposed by William Nylander in 1883 as a subgenus of the larger genus Lecanora, based on specimens he found growing on limestone rocks in France and near the Dead Sea. The genus was later formally accepted in 1974 and confirmed as a distinct evolutionary lineage through molecular studies in 2013, though it has undergone various taxonomic revisions over the decades. Leproplaca lichens have a distinctive leprose growth form, appearing as conspicuously powdery, yellow-orange crusts where the thallus consists primarily of asexual propagules called soredia. They rarely produce sexual fruiting bodies (apothecia), instead reproducing mainly through these tiny detachable particles that contain both fungal and algal cells.

== Taxonomy ==
William Nylander originally proposed Leproplaca as a subgenus of the large genus Lecanora in 1883. In his protologue, Nylander noted that the name Lecanora (Leproplaca) xanthogloia had been erroneously published as "corticola" instead of "calcicola", and he provided two localities for the species: on limestone rocks penetrating into the woods at Fontainebleau, and on limestone cliffs near the Dead Sea where Lecanora calopismatis was also found. Nylander described the lichen as having a citrine-golden thallus with thin, soft, leprose scales that were somewhat scalloped and white on the inside. He noted the presence of golden, rather wide patches that frequently showed golden colouration when treated with potassium hydroxide solution (turning purplish). Nylander explicitly stated that Leproplaca should be considered a subgenus, noting that it was related to Amphiloma but differed in that Amphiloma was truly fertile, whilst Leproplaca appeared to remain consistently sterile.

Modern molecular studies have confirmed Leproplaca as a distinct genus. In 2013, DNA analysis by Arup and colleagues showed that Leproplaca forms a separate evolutionary lineage closely related to Caloplaca in the strict sense, differing mainly in its yellow thallus containing anthraquinone pigments and the scarcity of sexual fruiting bodies. The genus has had a complex taxonomic history: it was formally accepted by Jack Laundon in 1974 for species with powdery, non-corticate thalli, but was later merged into a broader concept of Caloplaca by Anthony Fletcher and Laundon in 2009. Some species now placed in Leproplaca fall outside Laundon's original circumscription because they have a weakly developed cortex rather than being wholly leprose.

== Description ==
Leproplaca forms a conspicuously powdery (leprose) colony, usually lacking a proper outer skin (cortex). In some species the thallus starts as a thin crust and later develops shallow, sometimes lobed rims (placodioid growth). Its surface consists of minute, convex granules that appear yellow-ochre to dull orange; most species break these granules into soredia—tiny, readily detached packets of fungal and algal cells that serve as the main means of reproduction. Beneath this granular layer the medulla is white, and there is little or no contrasting prothallus, though a pale, occasionally fringed zone may border the thallus.

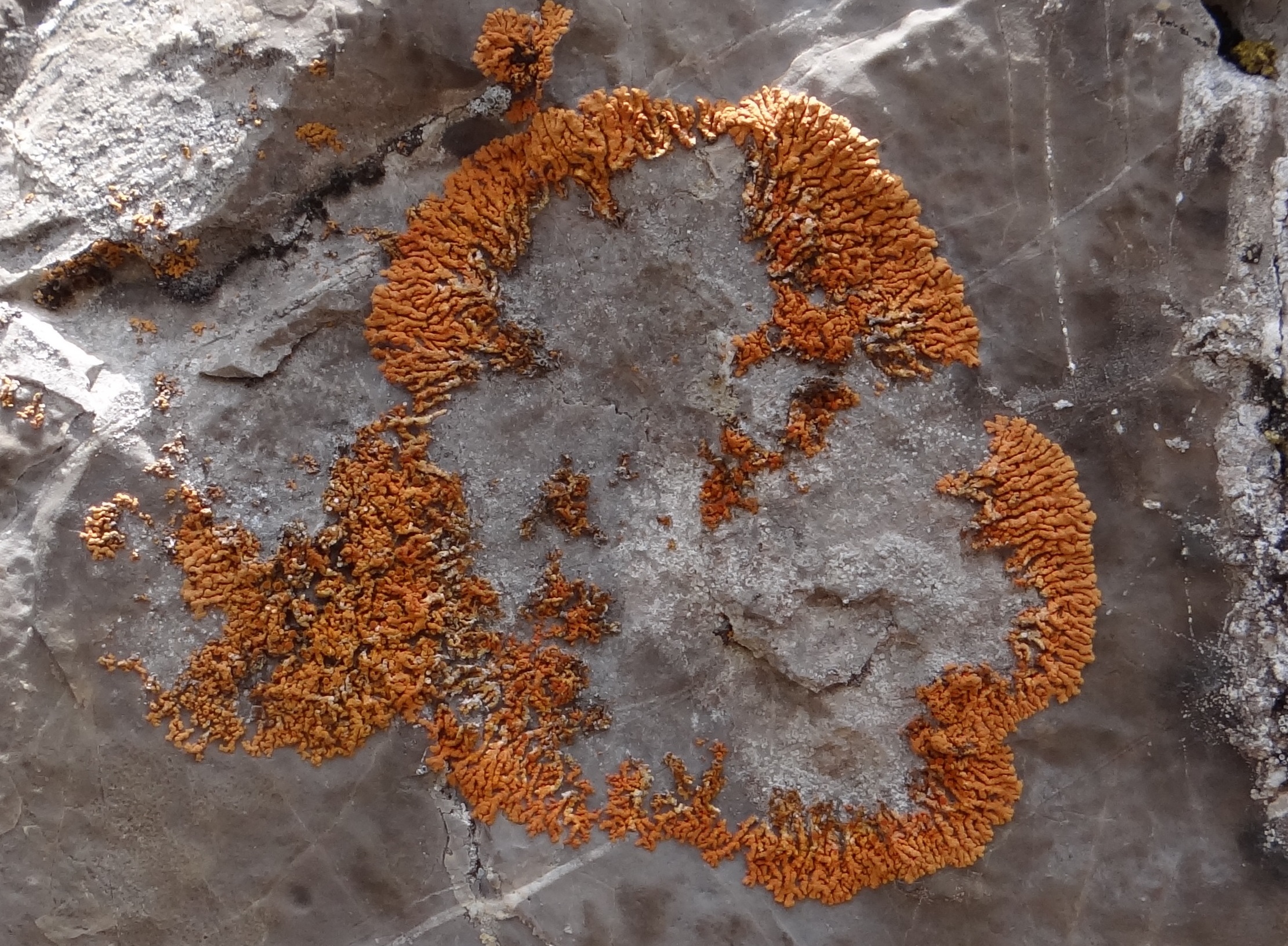
Leproplaca cirrochroa in the Tatra Mountains

Sexual structures are infrequent in Leproplaca. When present, the apothecia retain a rim of thallus tissue (a persistent thalline margin) around a deep-orange, flat disc. Inside the fruit body, slender, colourless threads (paraphyses) are close together and have only slightly swollen tips, while each ascus produces two narrowly ellipsoidal spores. These ascospores are polarilocular: a thin internal wall divides them into two compartments, giving a dumb-bell outline under the microscope. No specialised asexual structures (conidiomata) have been observed. All species turn purple when treated with potassium hydroxide solution (the K test), reflecting the presence of anthraquinone pigments, chiefly parietin, which are also responsible for the thallus's yellow-orange colouration.

== Habitat and distribution ==
Members of Leproplaca are primarily saxicolous lichens of shaded or sheltered rock surfaces, and several species favour hard calcareous substrates such as limestone and dolomite, although L. obliterans characteristically occupies moist, shaded, overhanging siliceous rock, especially granite. Some species also grow over bryophytes or occur on shaded mortar, and L. proteus has been described as a pioneer species on weathering calcareous rock surfaces among other crustose lichens.

Leproplaca is centred in Europe, where all five species have been recorded, but the genus extends more widely into Africa, Asia, Australia, New Zealand, North America, and South America. The broadest-ranging species are L. cirrochroa, recorded from Africa, Asia, Australia, Europe, and both North and South America, and L. chrysodeta, which occurs in Europe, the Middle East, Nepal, New Zealand, and North America, whereas L. proteus is known chiefly from mountain districts of the Alps and Carpathians and L. xantholyta is local in Europe from Ireland east to Israel. The genus spans a broad elevational range, from lowland calcareous and siliceous rocks to montane districts and, in the case of L. chrysodeta in Nepal, to 4,850 m above sea level, above the tree line used in that study.

== Species ==
As of June 2025, Species Fungorum (in the Catalogue of Life) accepts five species of Leproplaca:

- Leproplaca chrysodeta (Vain.) J.R.Laundon ex Ahti (2015)
- Leproplaca cirrochroa (Ach.) Arup, Frödén & Søchting (2013)
- Leproplaca obliterans (Nyl.) Arup, Frödén & Søchting (2013)
- Leproplaca proteus (Poelt) Arup, Frödén & Søchting (2013)
- Leproplaca xantholyta (Nyl.) Nyl. (1888)

Jack Laundon proposed the species Leproplaca lutea in 1983; this has since been reclassified in Flavoplaca, and is now known as Flavoplaca lutea.
