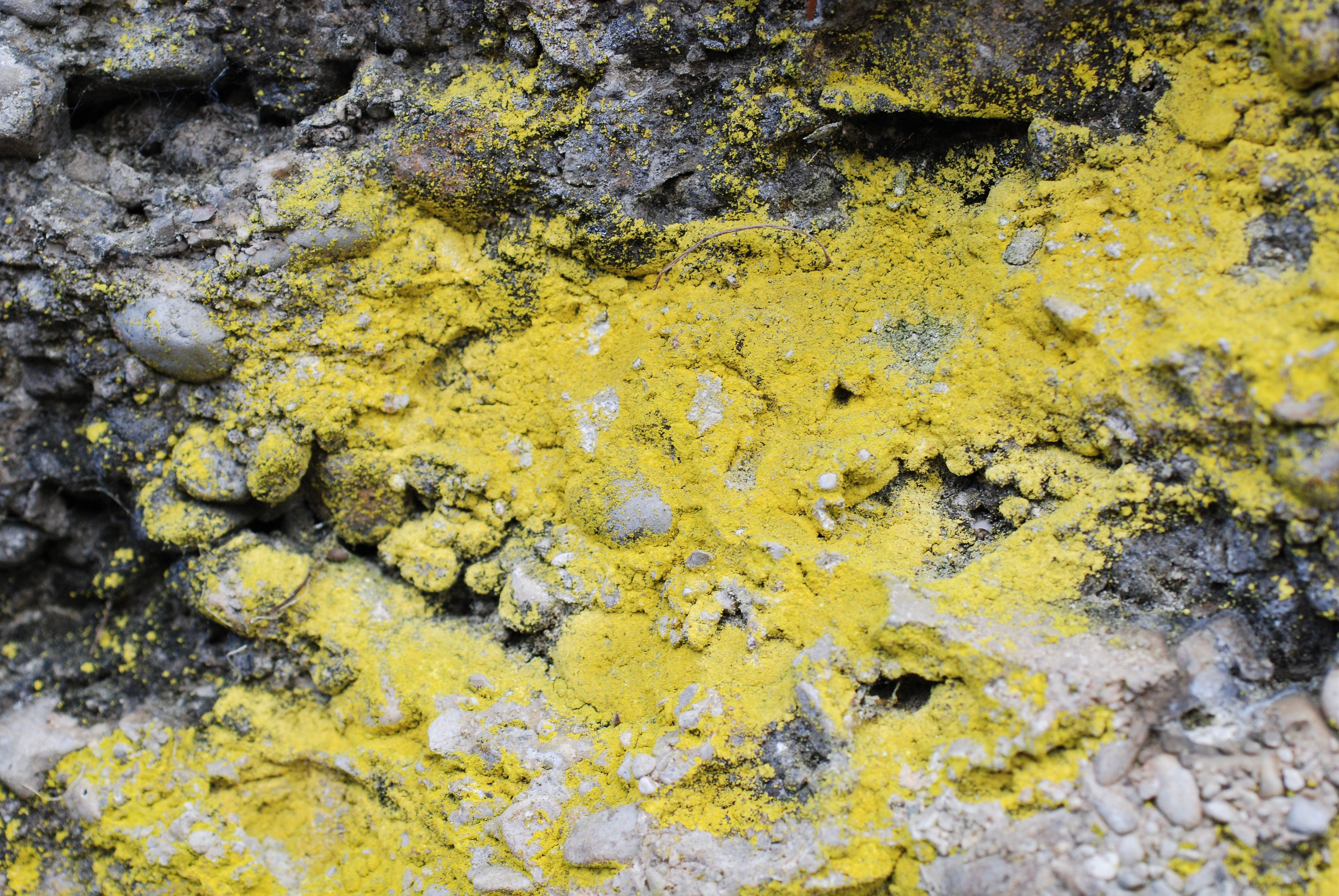

Scientific classification
- Kingdom: Fungi
- Division: Ascomycota
- Class: Lecanoromycetes
- Order: Teloschistales
- Family: Teloschistaceae
- Genus: Leproplaca
- Species: L. chrysodeta

Binomial name
- Leproplaca chrysodeta (Vain.) J.R.Laundon ex Ahti (2015)

Synonyms
- Placodium chrysodetum Vain. (1921); Callopisma chrysodetum (Vain.) Räsänen (1943); Caloplaca chrysodeta (Vain.) Dombr. (1970); Leproplaca chrysodeta (Vain.) J.R.Laundon (1974)

= Leproplaca chrysodeta =

Species of lichen-forming fungus

Leproplaca chrysodeta is a species of saxicolous (rock-dwelling) dust lichen in the family Teloschistaceae. It is found in northern North America, Europe, the Middle East, Nepal, and New Zealand.

== Taxonomy ==
Lichenologist Teuvo Ahti updated the classification of this species in 2015, placing it under the genus Leproplaca. The original name for this lichen was Placodium chrysodetum, first described by Edvard August Vainio in 1921 in both Finnish and German.

The species has had several name changes over the years. It was called Callopisma chrysodetum in 1943 by Veli Räsänen, and later attempts were made for it to be renamed to Caloplaca chrysodeta and Leproplaca chrysodeta, but these changes were not officially accepted due to certain nomenclatural rules (Article 41.8). According to Ahti, most people incorrectly thought Räsänen's 1931 citation was the official first description, but actually, Vainio's description from 1921 is the legitimate starting point. Räsänen's work just referred back to Vainio's original paper.

Ahti corrects this error by acknowledging Vainio's 1921 paper as the true original description, and in doing so, he provides the correct and officially recognized name for this lichen species under the genus Leproplaca. The detailed description by Vainio, written in German, described the lichen's thallus as sorediose (a texture term for lichens), yellow in colour, which turns purplish or bluish-red when the K chemical spot text is applied.

== Description ==
Leproplaca chrysodeta is characterised by a crust-like covering of powdery spherical granules, each approximately 100 μm in diameter. When mature, these granules coalesce to form a dense, patchy crust that can appear in shades from dull orange-brown to grey-yellow. This crust is not bounded by any distinctive edges or marginal lobes. When tested with a solution of potassium hydroxide (the K spot test) on the surface of the lichen, a purple reaction confirms its identity.

== Habitat and distribution ==
This lichen typically inhabits limestone cliffs and similar dry, shaded environments with calcareous stones. It often grows over mosses and can also be found on the mortar of walls if they are not in direct sunlight. Leproplaca chrysodeta is widely distributed across the British Isles, throughout many regions in Europe, as well as in the Middle East and New Zealand, where it is a common species. In Nepal, the lichen has been reported from 3,300 to 4,850 m elevation in a compilation of published records; this reported range extends above the tree line used in the study.

Clifford Wetmore reported that earlier North American records of this lichen had apparently been based on misidentified material of Caloplaca citrina (now Flavoplaca citrina), but confirmed the presence of the species in North America from collections in Ontario, Arizona, Kentucky, and Michigan. In that region it was found in humid, shaded situations on bryophytes and calcareous rock, including under rock overhangs, and was considered rare. Flavoplaca citrina differs in its darker, browner thallus and its preference for moist, shaded calcareous habitats rather than exposed sites.
