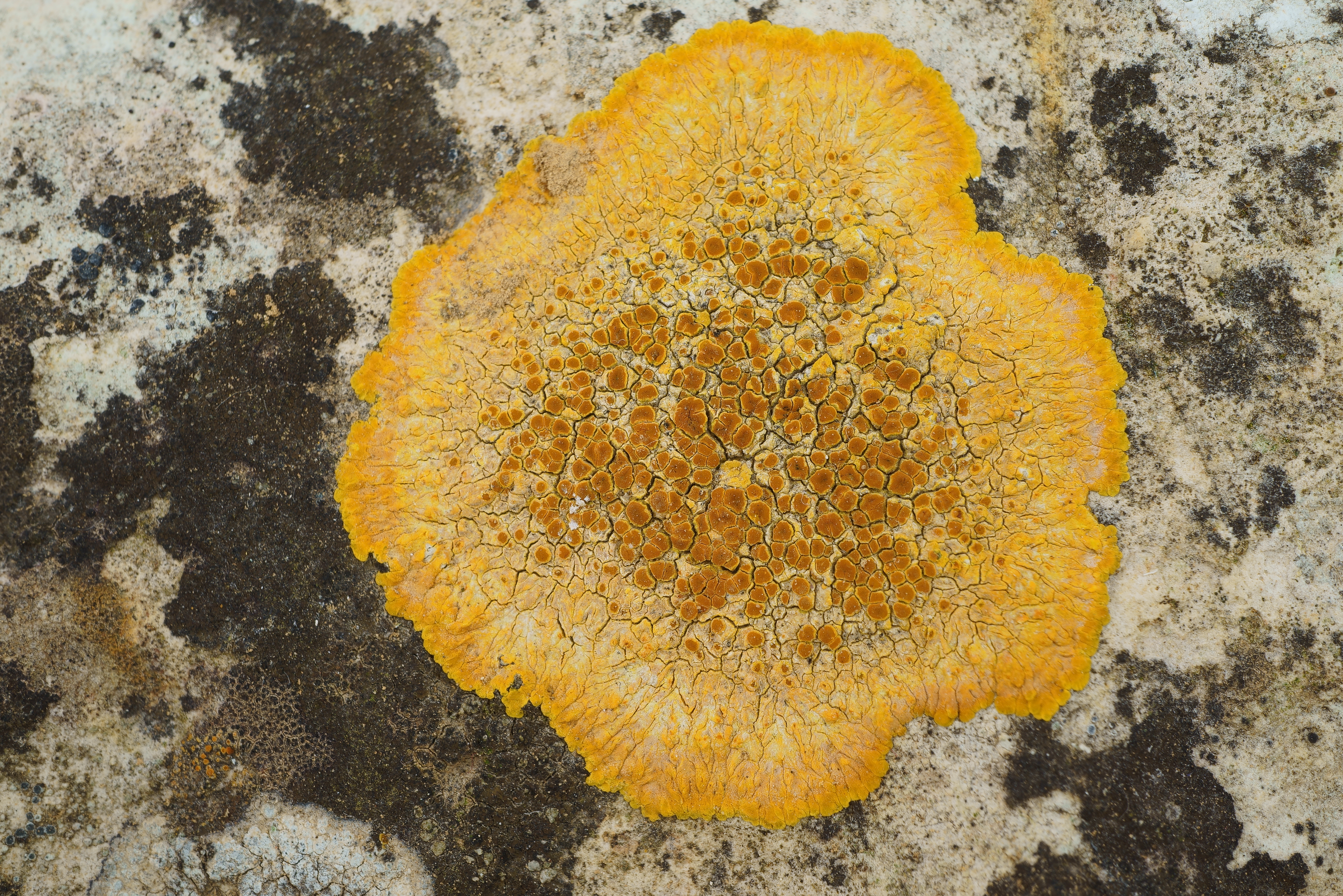

Scientific classification
- Domain: Eukaryota
- Kingdom: Fungi
- Division: Ascomycota
- Class: Lecanoromycetes
- Order: Teloschistales
- Family: Teloschistaceae
- Genus: Variospora
- Species: V. aurantia

Binomial name
- Variospora aurantia (Pers.) Arup, Frödén & Søchting (2013)

Synonyms
- Amphiloma aurantium (Pers.) Müll. Arg.; Amphiloma callopisma (Ach.) Körb.; Caloplaca aurantia (Pers.) Hellb.; Caloplaca callopisma (Ach.) Th. Fr.; Caloplaca callopisma var. aurantia (Pers.) Zahlbr.; Gasparrinia aurantia (Pers.) P. Syd.; Gasparrinia callopisma (Ach.) P. Syd.; Gasparrinia murorum var. callopisma (Ach.) Tornab.; Klauderuiella aurantia (Pers.) S.Y. Kondr. & Hur; Lecanora callopisma Ach.; Lecanora callopisma subvar. aurantia (Pers.) Wedd.; Lichen aurantius Pers.; Lichen peltatus callopisma (Ach.) Lam.; Parmelia callopisma (Ach.) Hepp; Parmelia murorum var. callopisma (Ach.) Fr.; Patellaria aurantia (Pers.) Pers.; Physcia aurantia (Pers.) Arnold; Physcia callopisma (Ach.) A. Massal.; Physcia callopisma f. aurantia (Pers.) Arnold; Placodium aurantium (Pers.) Vain.; Placodium callopismum (Ach.) Mérat; Placodium callopismum f. aurantium (Pers.) H. Olivier; Placodium murorum var. callopismum (Ach.) Mathieu; Teloschistes callopismus (Ach.) Trevis.; Verrucaria aurantia (Pers.) Wibel; Xanthoria callopisma (Ach.) Th. Fr.

= Variospora aurantia =

Species of lichen

Variospora aurantia is a species of lichen belonging to the family Teloschistaceae. In Sicily, it has been reported as a host for the lichenicolous fungus species Muellerella lichenicola.
