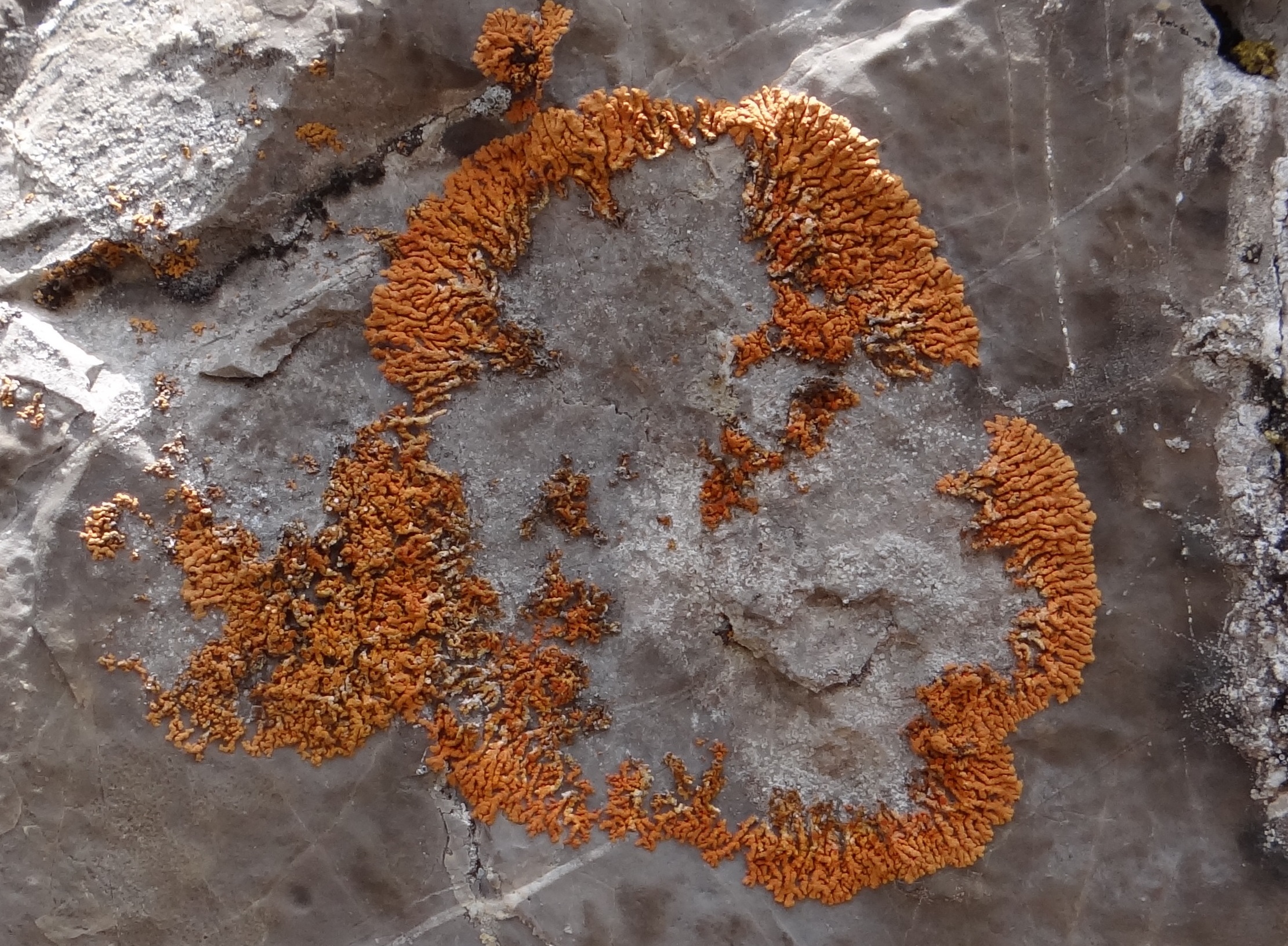
- in the Tatra Mountains

Conservation status
- Apparently Secure (NatureServe)

Scientific classification
- Domain: Eukaryota
- Kingdom: Fungi
- Division: Ascomycota
- Class: Lecanoromycetes
- Order: Teloschistales
- Family: Teloschistaceae
- Genus: Leproplaca
- Species: L. cirrochroa

Binomial name
- Leproplaca cirrochroa (Ach.) Arup, Frödén & Søchting (2013)

Synonyms
- List: Lecanora cirrochroa Ach. (1814); Parmelia murorum var. cirrochroa (Ach.) Schaer. (1840); Lecanora murorum var. cirrochroa (Ach.) Rabenh. (1845); Placodium murorum var. cirrochroum (Ach.) Flot. (1849); Physcia callopisma var. cirrochroa (Ach.) A.Massal. (1852); Amphiloma murorum var. cirrochroum (Ach.) Körb. (1855); Placodium cirrochroum (Ach.) Rabenh. (1856); Amphiloma cirrochroum (Ach.) Körb. (1859); Xanthoria cirrochroa (Ach.) Zwackh (1864); Physcia cirrochroa (Ach.) Arnold (1869); Caloplaca cirrochroa (Ach.) Th.Fr. (1871); Gasparrinia cirrochroa f. leprosa (Lamy) Verseghy (1971); Gasparrinia cirrochroa (Ach.) Stein (1879); Placodium murorum subsp. cirrochroum (Ach.) Tuck. (1882); Lecanora cirrochroa f. leprosa Lamy (1884); Placodium cirrochroum f. leprosum Shirley [as 'leprosa'] (1889); Caloplaca cirrochroa f. leprosa (Lamy) Zahlbr. (1931)

= Leproplaca cirrochroa =

Species of lichen

Leproplaca cirrochroa is a widespread and common species of saxicolous (rock-dwelling), crustose lichen in the family Teloschistaceae. It grows up to 5 cm across, featuring a placodioid thallus with narrow, finger-like lobes that adhere closely to the surface, showing intricate division and ranging in colour from dirty orange to brownish orange, often with paler, pruinose orange ends.

== Taxonomy ==
The species was first scientifically described by Swedish lichenologist Erik Acharius in 1814, as a member of the genus Lecanora. Ulf Arup and colleagues transferred it to the genus Leproplaca in 2013, following a molecular phylogenetics-based restructuring of the family Teloschistaceae.

== Description ==
Leproplaca cirrochroa is a distinctive lichen species that can grow up to 5 cm (2 in) across. Its thallus is placodioid, forming narrow, finger-like lobes that are closely appressed against the substrate. These lobes are intricately divided and arranged in irregularly rounded formations or sometimes as small, scattered, or contiguous thalli. The colouration of Leproplaca cirrochroa ranges from dirty to brown-orange, with the ends of the lobes often having a pruinose and paler orange hue.

The lobe ends are typically about 0.2–0.5 mm wide, rounded, and occasionally forked. They are shallowly convex and elongated, often lying contiguous to each other and separated by almost parallel-aligned furrows. Soralia are usually present on the laminal surface and are scattered across the thallus. These soralia are small and flat, rounded, and can be up to 0.8 mm in diameter. The soredia produced are farinose and lemon-yellow in colour.

Apothecia (fruiting bodies) are rare in Leproplaca cirrochroa, measuring up to 0.5 mm in diameter and scattered across the thallus. When present, the apothecia are flat with a persistent thalline margin that is orange in colour. The disc of the apothecia is a deeper orange shade. The paraphyses (filament-like support structures) are flexuose and mostly not swollen at the tips. Ascospores are narrowly ellipsoid, measuring 10–15 by 5 μm with a septum that is 2–3 μm wide, which is less than one-third of the length of the ascospore. All parts of this lichen react with a K+ (purple) colouration when subjected to chemical spot tests.

== Habitat and distribution ==
Leproplaca cirrochroa is widely distributed, having been recorded from Africa, Asia, Australia, Europe, and North and South America.
