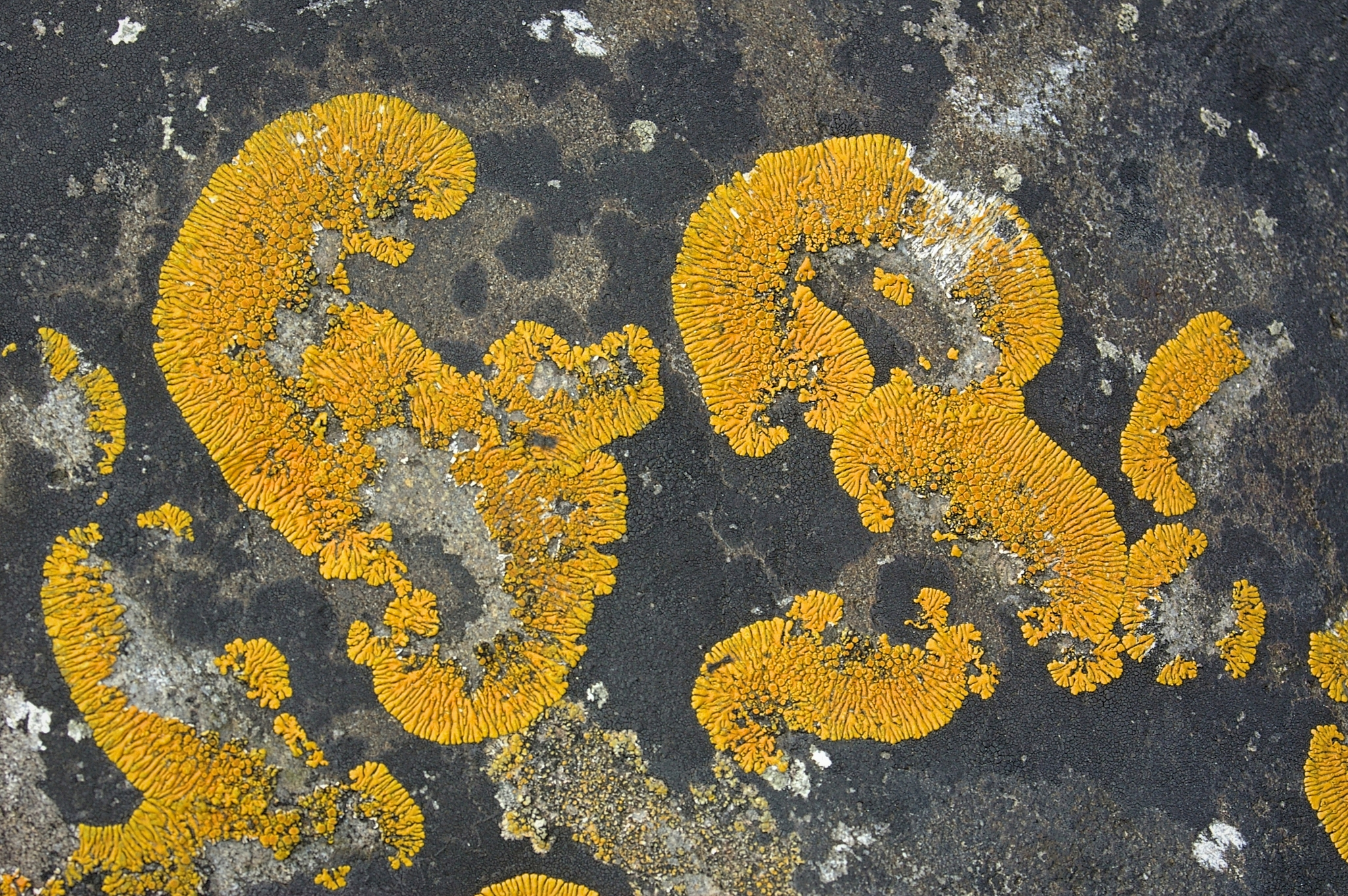

Scientific classification
- Domain: Eukaryota
- Kingdom: Fungi
- Division: Ascomycota
- Class: Lecanoromycetes
- Order: Teloschistales
- Family: Teloschistaceae
- Genus: Variospora
- Species: V. thallincola

Binomial name
- Variospora thallincola (Wedd.) Arup, Frödén & Søchting (2013)

Synonyms
- List: Lecanora murorum var. thallincola Wedd. (1875); Physcia murorum f. thallincola (Wedd.) Arnold (1881); Physcia murorum var. thallincola (Wedd.) Arnold (1881); Placodium murorum var. thallincolum (Wedd.) H.Olivier (1897); Placodium thallincolum (Wedd.) H.Olivier (1909); Lecanora heppiana f. thallincola (Wedd.) Harm. (1913); Lecanora heppiana var. thallincola (Wedd.) Harm. (1913); Caloplaca thallincola (Wedd.) Du Rietz (1925); Placodium callopismum f. thallincolum (Wedd.) Walt.Watson (1930); Caloplaca aurantia f. thallincola (Wedd.) Zahlbr. (1931); Caloplaca aurantia var. thallincola (Wedd.) I.M.Lamb (1936); Gasparrinia thallincola (Wedd.) Oxner (1990); Klauderuiella thallincola (Wedd.) S.Y.Kondr. & Hur (2017)

= Variospora thallincola =

Species of lichen

Variospora thallincola is a species of saxicolous (rock-dwelling), crustose lichen in the family Teloschistaceae.

== Taxonomy ==
It was formally described as a new species in 1875 by the botanist Hugh Algernon Weddell, who named it Lecanora murorum var. thallincola. Gustaf Einar Du Rietz raised it to species status in 1925, as Caloplaca thallincola. Ulf Arup and colleagues transferred the taxon to the genus Variospora in 2013, following a molecular phylogenetics-based restructuring of the family Teloschistaceae.

== Description ==
Variospora thallincola is characterised by its placodioid, bright orange thallus that forms closely appressed, circular structures resembling cartwheels, each measuring 3–4 cm in diameter. The thallus features convex, finger-like lobe ends, around 0.3–0.7 mm broad, which lie closely together and are separated by frequently parallel furrows. The central area of the thallus is convex and areolate, and lacks pruina, a powdery or waxy coating.

The species develops apothecia, the fruiting structures, which can be up to 0.8 mm in diameter and are generally scattered across the central area of the thallus. The thalline margin of the apothecia is orange and becomes excluded as they age. The discs of these apothecia are brown-orange in colour and transform from flat to convex over time. Within the apothecia, the paraphyses (sterile filamentous structures) are loose, with some being simple while most fork towards their tips, which are slightly swollen. The ascospores of Variospora thallincola are distinctive for their swollen, lemon-shaped appearance, measuring 11–14 by 8–11 μm with a septum width of 4–5 μm, accounting for half the length of the ascospore. Both the thallus and the apothecia react to a potassium hydroxide (K) spot test by turning purple.

== Habitat and distribution ==
Found on rocky coasts with siliceous stone, Variospora thallincola typically grows in the mesic to submesic-supralittoral zones. It prefers north-facing rock surfaces that are shaded. The lichen is widely distributed, having been reported from Africa, Asia, Europe, and North America.
