= Ferdinand Christian Gustav Arnold =

German botanist and lichenologist (1828–1901)

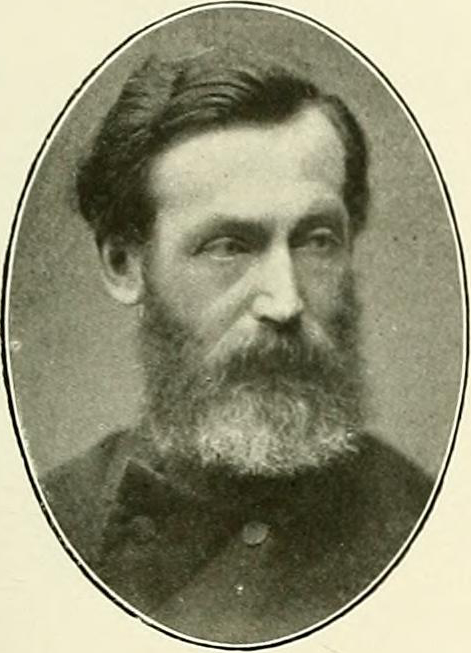
Ferdinand Christian Gustav Arnold

Ferdinand Christian Gustav Arnold (24 February 1828 – 8 August 1901) was a German lichenologist and taxonomist born in Ansbach, Bavaria. Even as a high school student he showed an active interest in botany: "Ich und August Gattinger ... durchstreiften von November 1846 bis zum Spätherbst 1847, Pflanzen sammelnd, die Landschaft von München nach allen Richtungen." ("August Gattinger and I … roamed across the landscape of Munich from November 1846 up to the late autumn 1847, collecting plants, in all directions.").

He studied jurisprudence at the Ludwig-Maximilians-Universität München (LMU) and Heidelberg University and during his career practiced law at the Catholic University of Eichstätt-Ingolstadt (1857–77) and LMU (1877–96). He was awarded an honorary doctorate by the LMU in 1878. Additionally, he was a student of botanists Carl Friedrich Philipp von Martius (1794–1868) and Otto Sendtner (1813–1859), and devoted his spare time to floristics and classification of plants and fungi.

His initial studies dealt with vascular plants, but his primary focus later shifted to lichens and bryophytes. Well known for his studies of herbarium specimens, his personal herbarium contained approximately 150,000 specimens, largely consisting of lichens and lichenicolous fungi. He edited and distributed several exsiccatae, among others Lichenes exsiccati [Lichenes Jurae] (1859–1879) and Lichenes Monacenses exsiccati (1889–1900). Several fascicles of the series Cladoniae exsiccatae were edited by Heinrich Rehm together with him. Today his collection is kept at the Botanische Staatssammlung München.

Arnold was the author of Lichenologische Ausflüge in Tirol (Lichenological Excursions in Tyrol), which is still considered to be an important source of information on alpine lichenology. He was a founding member of the Bayerische Botanische Gesellschaft, and in 1878 he received an honorary doctorate from the Ludwig-Maximilians-Universität München. Arnold died in Munich in 1901.

Arnold's handwriting is considered exceptionally difficult to read and Hannes Hertel, a director of the Botanische Staatssammlung, devoted significant effort to transcribing Arnold's writing so that others could read it. The journal series Arnoldia, named in his honor, started publication in 1991, devoted to describing the labels, i.e. the "schedae" and annotations of exsiccata series distributed by in the Botanische Staatssammlung. In 2007, Hertel published the lichen genus Farnoldia, named after Ferdinand Christian Gustav Arnold.

== Selected publications ==
The following list represents a small sampling of the approximately 140 publications of Arnold.

- (1869). Lichenologische Ausflüge in Tirol. IV. Der Schlern. Verhandlungen der Zoologisch-Botanischen Gesellschaft zu Wien 19: 605–610.
- (1870). Lichenologische Fragmente. X. Flora 53: 465–469.
- (1871). Lichenologische Fragmente. XI. Flora 54: 49–50.
- (1876). Lichenologische Ausflüge in Tirol. XV. Gurgl. Verhandlungen der Zoologisch-Botanischen Gesellschaft zu Wien 26: 353–371.
- (1879). Lichenologische Ausflüge in Tirol: XX. Predazzo. Verhandlungen der Zoologisch-Botanischen Gesellschaft zu Wien 29: 351–356.
- (1880). Lichenologische Ausflüge in Tirol. XXI. Berichtigungen und Nachträge. B. Verzeichnis der Tiroler Lichenen. Verhandlungen der Zoologisch-Botanischen Gesellschaft zu Wien 30: 95–117.
- (1881). Lichenes Britannici exsiccati, herausgegeben von Leighton. Flora 44: 435–661.
- (1881). Lichenologische Fragmente. XXIV [concl.]. Flora 64: 193–196.
- (1884). Die Lichenen des Fränkischen Jura [cont.]. Flora 67: 403–416.
- (1885). Die Lichenen des Fränkischen Jura [cont.]. Flora 68: 49–55.
- (1885). Die Lichenen des Fränkischen Jura [cont.]. Flora 68: 143–158.
- (1885). Die Lichenen des Fränkischen Jura [cont.]. Flora 68: 211–246.
- (1887). Lichenologische Ausflüge in Tirol. XXIII. Predazzo und Paneveggio. Verhandlungen der Zoologisch-Botanischen Gesellschaft zu Wien 37: 81–98.
- (1896). Lichenologische Ausflüge in Tirol. XXVII. Galtür. Verhandlungen der Zoologisch-Botanischen Gesellschaft zu Wien 46: 105–107.

The standard author abbreviation Arnold is used to indicate this person as the author when citing a botanical name.

== See also ==
- Category:Taxa named by Ferdinand Christian Gustav Arnold
