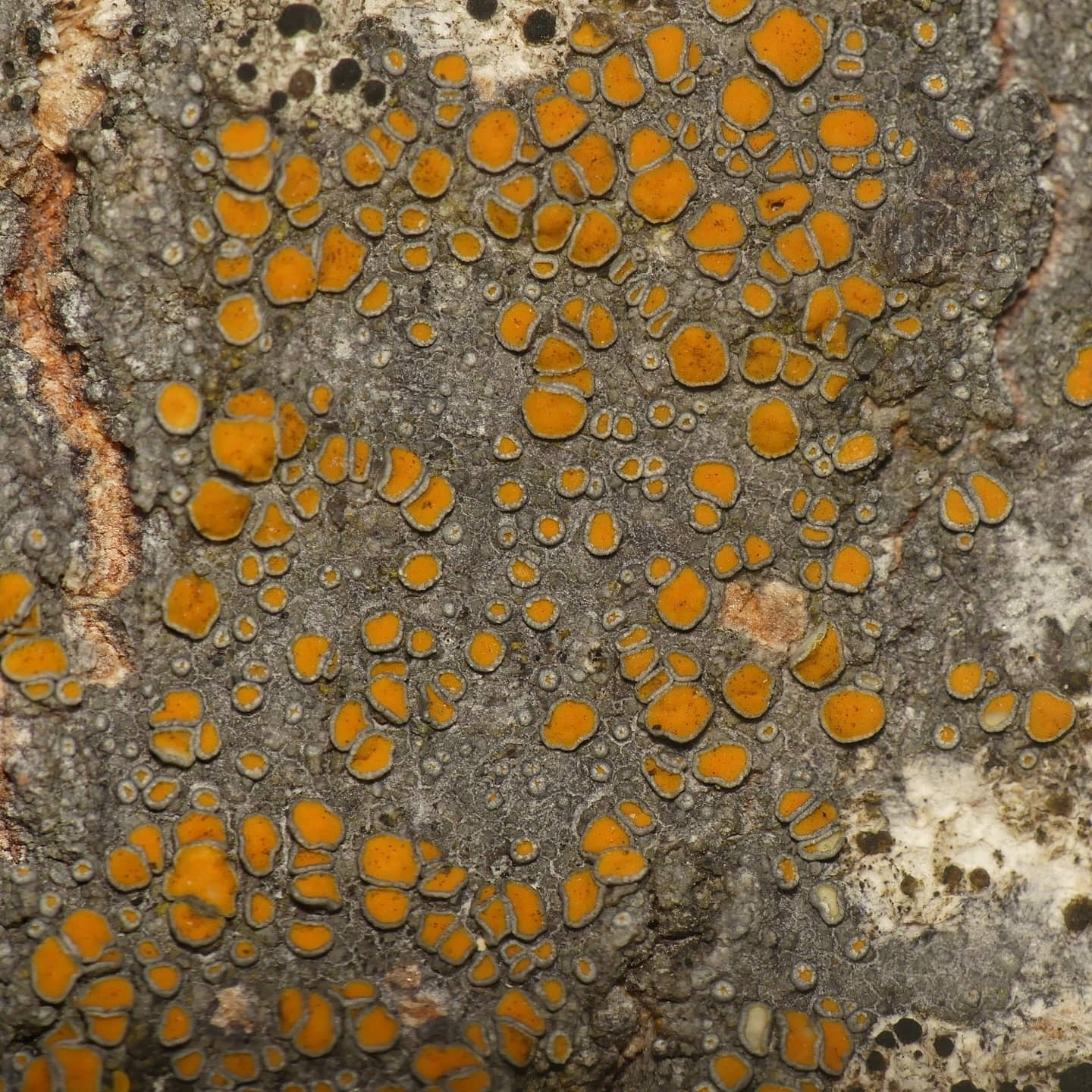
- Caloplaca cerina

Scientific classification
- Domain: Eukaryota
- Kingdom: Fungi
- Division: Ascomycota
- Class: Lecanoromycetes
- Order: Teloschistales
- Family: Teloschistaceae
- Genus: Caloplaca; Th.Fr. (1860)

Type species
- Caloplaca cerina (Ehrh. ex Hedw.) Th.Fr. (1861)

Species
- List of Caloplaca species

= Caloplaca =

Genus of lichen-forming fungi

Caloplaca is a lichen genus comprising a number of distinct species. Members of the genus are commonly called firedot lichen, jewel lichen. gold lichens, "orange lichens", but they are not always orange, as in the case of C. albovariegata. The distribution of this lichen genus is worldwide, extending from Antarctica to the high Arctic. It includes a portion of northern North America and the Russian High Arctic. There are about thirty species of Caloplaca in the flora of the British Isles.

A new species of Caloplaca, C. obamae, the first species to be named in honor of Barack Obama, was discovered in 2007 on Santa Rosa Island in California and published in March 2009.

== Taxonomy ==
Caloplaca was circumscribed in 1860 by Theodor Magnus Fries.

Until relatively recently, Caloplaca was one of the largest genera of lichen-forming fungi, with more than 500 species. Since the advent of molecular phylogenetics, the formerly polyphyletic genus has been split into more than 30 smaller, monophyletic genera after many publications by Ukrainian lichenologist Sergey Kondratyuk and colleagues. Modern taxonomic studies have significantly narrowed the definition of Caloplaca, with many species now placed in other genera. The genus shows close relationships to Leproplaca and Variospora, with many species growing on tree bark.

== Description ==
Caloplaca is a genus of crustose lichens characterised by their grey to white thallus (main body) and distinctive yellow to orange fruiting bodies (apothecia). Unlike some related genera, the thallus lacks anthraquinone pigments but contains Sedifolia-grey pigment, which turns violet when tested with potassium hydroxide solution (the K spot test).

The thallus structure includes a protective outer layer (cortex) made of rounded cells. Some species produce reproductive structures called soredia, blastidia or isidia. Like most lichens, Caloplaca contains a green algal partner (photobiont) from the genus Trebouxia.

The apothecia feature a persistent rim (thalline margin) matching the thallus colour, whilst the central disc (which features the hymenium–the fertile, spore-bearing surface) displays vibrant yellow to orange hues. Internally, the apothecia contain colourless layers and thread-like structures (paraphyses) that may branch and have enlarged tips. The spore-producing sacs (asci) each contain eight colourless, elliptical ascospores divided into two compartments by a septum.

The genus is distinguished by its chemistry, particularly the presence of parietin (the main secondary metabolite) and smaller amounts of related substances. These anthraquinone compounds occur only in the apothecia, not the thallus.

== List of species ==
List of Caloplaca species

== Gallery ==
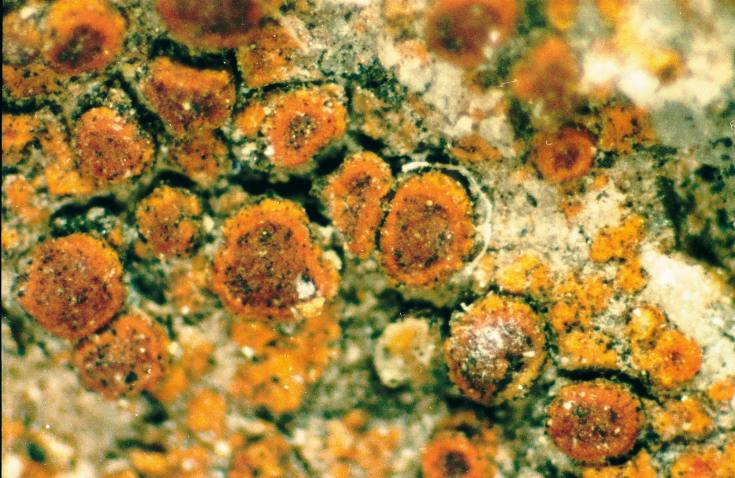
Caloplaca sideritis
