= Flavoplaca sol =

Scientific classification
- Kingdom: Fungi
- Division: Ascomycota
- Class: Lecanoromycetes
- Order: Teloschistales
- Family: Teloschistaceae
- Genus: Flavoplaca
- Species: F. sol

Binomial name
- Flavoplaca sol (Orange) Arup & Søchting (2024)
- Holotype site: Benllech, Wales

Synonyms
- Caloplaca sol Orange (2017)

Species of lichen

Flavoplaca sol (formerly Caloplaca sol) is a species of saxicolous (rock-dwelling), crustose lichen in the family Teloschistaceae. It is found on limestone and basic siliceous rocks along the southern and western shores of Great Britain.

== Taxonomy ==
The lichen was formally described as a new species in 2018 by the lichenologist Alan Orange. The species epithet sol, derived from the Latin word for "sun", was chosen to reflect the rich yellow colour of its often circular thalli, and its preference for growing on dry, sun-exposed rocks. In 2024, based on molecular phylogenetics analysis, the species was transferred to the genus Flavoplaca by Ulf Arup and Ulrik Søchting. The analysis showed that F. sol forms part of a sister clade to most other Flavoplaca species, alongside F. navasiana and F. itiana.

== Description ==
The lichen features a prominent, crust-like, non-placodioid, orange-yellow body with cracks, and fruiting bodies (apothecia) that are up to about 0.66 millimetres in diameter. Its spores are approximately 11.0 to 13.0 micrometres in length, with a septum (a dividing wall or partition) about 0.4 times the length of the spore. The species is found exclusively near coastal areas in southern and western Britain, with known locations ranging from Dorset and Cornwall up to North Wales.

== Similar species ==
Flavoplaca sol, with its well-defined, cracked-areolate, completely epilithic thallus and sessile apothecia the same colour as its thallus, can be easily confused with other species in the field. It is often mistaken for a morph of Flavoplaca marina, which typically has a darker orange colour and more convex areoles. Flavoplaca marina is commonly found in the splash zone of seashores, sometimes extending above the high-water mark on sea-facing slopes. Its areoles are usually thicker and strongly convex near the shore, but those found above the splash zone may resemble F. sol more closely, presenting challenges in distinguishing individual specimens based solely on morphology.

Flavoplaca maritima differs from F. sol in its more convex areoles that tend to become isolated as the thallus ages, and its young apothecia often feature a yellow crenulate thalline margin. Another species, Gyalolechia flavovirescens, has large orange apothecia, which contrast sharply with its yellow epilithic thallus. Xanthocarpia diffusa, typically found on damp or poorly drained surfaces and not in coastal habitats in Great Britain, has a less developed epilithic thallus and ascospores with a much narrower septum. Finally, Athallia vitellinula, as defined by Ulf Arup, is a non-maritime species characterised by a thin, inconspicuous, discontinuous pale yellow thallus, and small apothecia up to 0.44 mm in diameter in British specimens.
