= Haloplaca sorediella =

Scientific classification
- Domain: Eukaryota
- Kingdom: Fungi
- Division: Ascomycota
- Class: Lecanoromycetes
- Order: Teloschistales
- Family: Teloschistaceae
- Genus: Haloplaca
- Species: H. sorediella

Binomial name
- Haloplaca sorediella (Arup) Arup, Frödén & Søchting (2013)

Synonyms
- Caloplaca sorediella Arup (2006)

Species of lichen

Haloplaca sorediella is a species of saxicolous (rock-dwelling) crustose lichen in the family Teloschistaceae. It grows exclusively in maritime environments along the western coast of Great Britain. First described in 2006 by the Swedish lichenologist Ulf Arup as Caloplaca sorediella before being reclassified in 2013, it forms small yellow to orange-yellow patches on coastal rocks, plant debris, and at the base of shoreline plants. The lichen is distinguished by its dot-like soralia that produce fine powdery propagules (soredia) for reproduction, as no fruiting bodies have been observed in this species. It inhabits the upper shoreline zone just above the high tide mark in exposed locations across western England, Wales and Scotland, where it often grows alongside other coastal lichens.

== Taxonomy ==
It was formally described as a new species in 2006 by the Swedish lichenologist Ulf Arup, who classified it in the genus Caloplaca. The type specimen was collected during a field trip to western England and Wales in 1992. It was found growing on sheltered granite rocks on a seashore of a peninsula between Rushy Bay and Stony Porth in Bryher. The species name sorediella refers to the small soralia (structures producing soredia) and soredia (tiny vegetative propagules) characteristic of this lichen. Arup and colleagues transferred the taxon to the genus Haloplaca as part of a large-scale, molecular phylogenetics-based restructuring of the Teloschistaceae they published in 2013.

== Description ==
Haloplaca sorediella forms a thallus (the main body of the lichen) typically measuring 0.2–1 cm in diameter, occasionally reaching up to 2 cm. The thallus consists of scattered to contiguous areoles (small, island-like sections) that occasionally form small, warty cushions. These areoles are convex and often feature an incised base or form minute squamules (scale-like structures). They measure 0.1–0.5 mm across and 0.1–0.25 mm thick, though they can reach up to 0.8 mm when forming cushions. The areoles range in colour from pale yellow to orange-yellow, sometimes appearing grey, and their surface is usually soon covered by soredia.

A key identifying feature of H. sorediella is its punctiform (dot-like) soralia, which measure 0.1–0.35 (sometimes up to 0.5) mm in diameter. These soralia are round to somewhat irregular in shape and are located one on top of each areole, often covering most of the areole's surface. They appear slightly concave to slightly convex and have an intense yellow to yellowish orange colour, usually more vibrant than the thallus itself. The soredia produced are fine, without protruding hyphae, measuring 20–40 μm, occasionally forming consoredia or blastidia-like structures up to 50 μm in diameter. The species lacks a prothallus (a visible margin at the edge of the thallus).

Apothecia (fruiting bodies) and pycnidia (asexual reproductive structures) have not been observed in this species, suggesting it relies primarily on vegetative reproduction through its soredia. Chemically, the main secondary metabolite in H. sorediella is parietin, which occurs as a major substance along with smaller amounts of fallacinal, emodin, fallacinol and parietinic acid. This chemical profile corresponds to chemosyndrome A as described by Ulrik Søchting in 1997, and can help in chemical identification of the species.

== Habitat and distribution ==
Haloplaca sorediella grows primarily on seashore rocks of various types, including hard siliceous rocks, sandstone, and volcanic rocks. It can also be found on plant debris or at the base of plants such as Armeria (thrift) or Spergularia (sandspurry). When growing on rocks, it is typically found on steep surfaces that are usually exposed or very exposed to the elements, though it can also be found in more sheltered locations. Most collections of this species have been made in the mesic supralittoral zone (the upper shoreline just above the high tide mark) or just above it, and it is classified as inhabiting the "xeric-supralittoral" zone in a 2023 study of UK marine and maritime lichens. In one locality in Scotland (Achmelvich in West Sutherland), the species has been found a short distance away from the shore.

Haloplaca sorediella is known only from western Britain, including sites in Western England (Land's End, the Scilly Isles), Wales (Bardsey Island, Skomer Island), and Scotland (west Sutherland). It is thought to be a primarily marine or maritime species, though it may potentially be found elsewhere in western Europe. It often grows alongside other Teloschistaceae (and former Caloplaca) species, most commonly Haloplaca britannica and Flavoplaca microthallina, but also Flavoplaca marina. Hydropunctaria maura is also commonly found growing with H. sorediella, and sometimes Lecania atrynioides occurs as an accompanying species.
