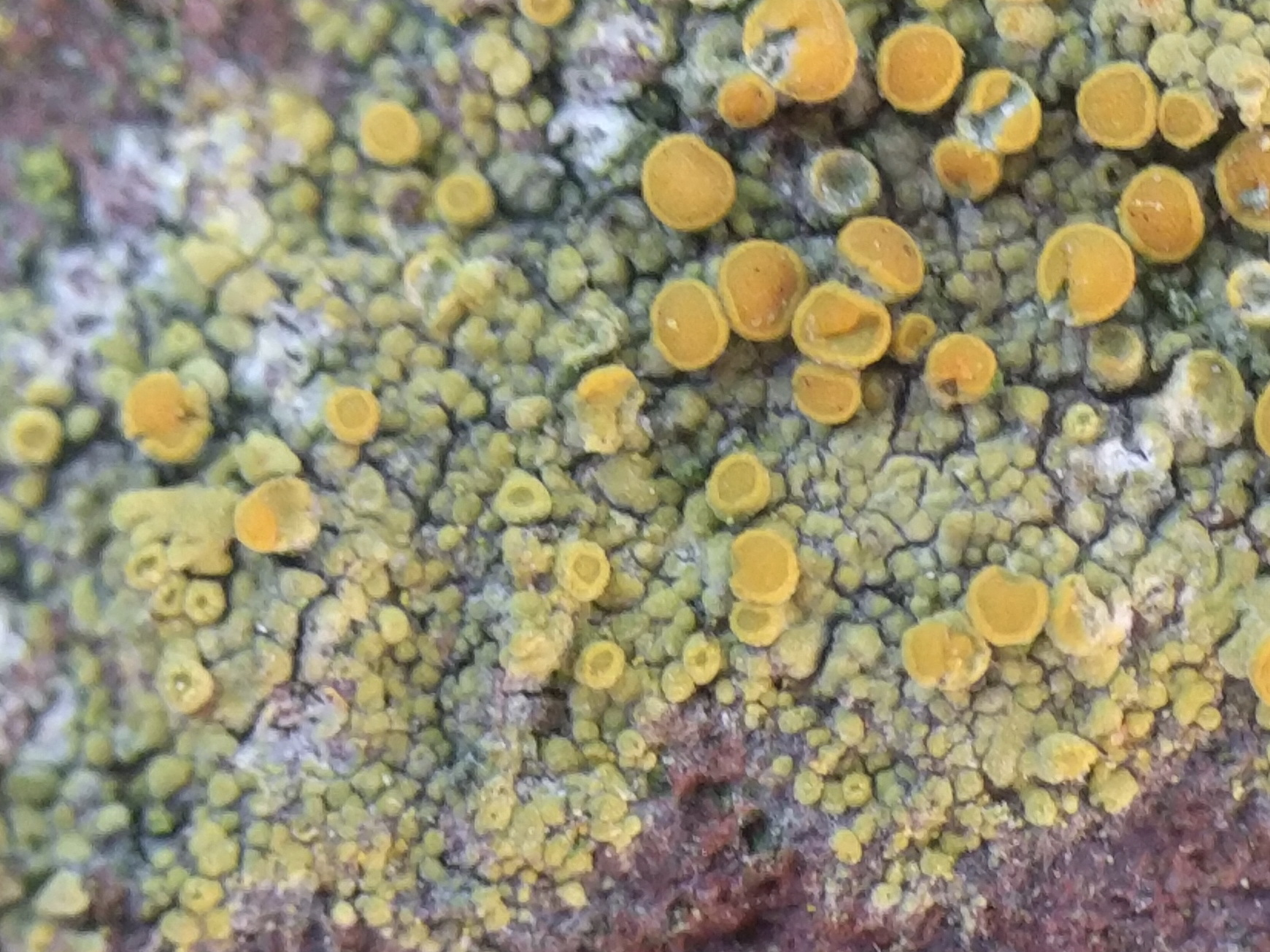

Scientific classification
- Domain: Eukaryota
- Kingdom: Fungi
- Division: Ascomycota
- Class: Lecanoromycetes
- Order: Teloschistales
- Family: Teloschistaceae
- Genus: Flavoplaca
- Species: F. ruderum

Binomial name
- Flavoplaca ruderum (Malbr.) Arup & Søchting (2024)

Synonyms
- List: Lecanora aurantiaca var. ruderum Malbr. (1873); Placodium decipiens var. ruderum (Malbr.) Malbr. (1877); Placodium ruderum (Malbr.) H.Olivier (1884); Lecanora decipiens var. ruderum (Malbr.) Hue (1891); Placodium decipiens f. ruderum (Malbr.) Boistel (1903); Gasparrinia decipiens f. ruderum (Malbr.) Mereschk. (1913); Caloplaca ruderum (Malbr.) J.R.Laundon (1976)

= Flavoplaca ruderum =

Species of lichen

Flavoplaca ruderum is a species of saxicolous (rock-dwelling) crustose lichen in the family Teloschistaceae. It is found in Europe. It was first described in 1873 and was moved to the genus Flavoplaca in 2024 based on DNA studies. This lichen typically grows on man-made structures like church walls and concrete surfaces, where it forms thick, irregular yellow-white crusts with orange fruiting bodies.

== Taxonomy ==
The lichen was first described in 1873 by the French botanist Alexandre François Malbranche, who classified it as a variety of Lecanora aurantiaca. Jack Laundon promoted the taxon to species status in genus Caloplaca in 1976. Ulf Arup and Ulrik Søchting transferred it to Flavoplaca in 2024. Arup and Søchting confirmed the move to Flavoplaca with a DNA study published in 2024. They sequenced 18 fresh collections from Denmark, Sweden and the United Kingdom and compared them with earlier Teloschistaceae data. In the resulting family tree "Caloplaca ruderum" grouped firmly inside the main Flavoplaca clade, sitting next to F. communis, F. maritima and F. havaasii. Because the genetic evidence matched its appearance and ecology, they formally renamed the species Flavoplaca ruderum. To secure the name, Malbranche's original 1873 specimen was chosen as the lectotype.

== Description ==
Flavoplaca ruderum forms a thick, uneven crust that adheres tightly to its substrate (a crustose thallus). The surface is broken into prominent, white-pruinose patches (areoles) that are markedly convex to almost spherical, sometimes approaching the look of tiny flakes (squamules). Individual areoles measure about 0.5–1.5 mm in diameter and often fuse together, giving the thallus a very irregular, yellow to yellow-white mosaic.

The reproductive structures (apothecia) are scattered to crowded across the thallus. Each is up to 1.5 mm across, initially rounded but liable to become distorted as neighbouring apothecia press against one another with age. A thick (roughly 0.2 mm) white-pruinose rim derived from the thallus (thalline margin) surrounds the orange-brown disc, which is cup-shaped (urceolate) when young and later flattens out. Internally, unbranched paraphyses thread the hymenium, many ending in swollen tips about 5 μm wide. The asci contain ellipsoidal spores 10–15 × 6–8 μm with a single cross-wall (septum) 2.5–5 μm thick—roughly one-fifth to one-third the length of the spore. Both thallus and apothecia turn purple when treated with potassium hydroxide (a K+ reaction), a spot test that helps confirm the species.

== Habitat and distribution ==
Flavoplaca ruderum is primarily a lichen of soft, lime-rich substrates made by people. Typical colonies carpet mortar, limestone or concrete on church walls, windowsills and other masonry, where the surface is slightly friable and faces strong light. Danish material even occurs on the calcareous soil of an old church dike, underscoring the species' preference for basic, man-made habitats. All Swedish records are likewise on concrete walls, roofs or poles; although these sites lie a few hundred metres from the coast, they are shielded from salt spray, confirming that tidal influence is not required. Across the examined localities the lichen was always found in open, well-lit positions on either vertical or horizontal faces of the substrate.

The species is western European. It was long known from Spain in the south-west and northwards through France and Great Britain to Denmark; recent discoveries at three sites in Skåne, southern Sweden, extend its recorded range further north. Within this area F. ruderum is commonest inland on calcareous walls that receive full sun, and only rarely ventures onto natural littoral rocks. In the Netherlands, it is part of the Lecanoretum pannonicae ecological community, which includes the species Lecanora pannonica, Lecanora antiqua, Lecanora sulphurea, Dirina massiliensis, Diploicia canescens, and Tephromela atra.
