= Flavoplaca arcisproxima =

Scientific classification
- Domain: Eukaryota
- Kingdom: Fungi
- Division: Ascomycota
- Class: Lecanoromycetes
- Order: Teloschistales
- Family: Teloschistaceae
- Genus: Flavoplaca
- Species: F. arcisproxima

Binomial name
- Flavoplaca arcisproxima (Vondrák, P.Říha, Arup & Søchting) Arup, Søchting & Frödén (2013)

Synonyms
- Caloplaca arcisproxima Vondrák, Říha, Arup & Søchting (2009)

Species of lichen

Flavoplaca arcisproxima is a species of saxicolous (rock-dwelling), crustose lichen in the family Teloschistaceae. It is found primarily in the coastal regions of the Crimean Peninsula and the eastern Mediterranean, particularly in Crete, Greece.

== Taxonomy ==
The lichen was formally described in 2009 by the lichenologists Jan Vondrák, Jan Říha, Ulf Arup, and Ulrik Søchting. The species is named arcisproxima, meaning "close to arcis", reflecting its phylogenetic and morphological similarity to Caloplaca arcis. The taxon was transferred to the genus Flavoplaca in 2013 following a molecular phylogenetics-informed restructuring of the family Teloschistaceae.

== Description ==
The thallus of Flavoplaca arcisproxima is coloured yellow to yellow-orange, comprising solitary or rarely aggregated, somewhat umbilicate squamules. These squamules are flat, smooth, and have margins divided into minute lobes. They are typically 80 to 240 μm thick and 0.44 to 1.18 mm wide. The marginal soralia are of the confusa or flavocitrina type, with soredia or blastidia measuring between 25 and 86 μm in diameter. The species lacks a distinct cortex, but has an alveolate (honeycombed) cortex with a thickness ranging from 8 to 46 μm.

Apothecia were absent in the initial specimens of Flavoplaca arcisproxima investigated. They were found in some specimens collected in Ukraine. Conidia are quite small, with measurements ranging from 2.5 to 4.0 μm in length and 0.5 to 1.5 μm in width.

== Distribution and ecology ==
Flavoplaca arcisproxima is known from maritime sites, usually in the supralittoral zone. It prefers base-rich, hard siliceous rocks, such as diabase, and can also be found on lime-rich claystone. The species is found accompanying several other lichen species, including Caloplaca cf. aegea, Calogaya biatorina, Caloplaca aff. furax, Kuettlingeria teicholyta, Candelariella plumbea, C. vitellina, Catillaria chalybeia, Diplotomma alboatrum, Polyozosia albescens, Polyozosia dispersa, Phaeophyscia orbicularis, Verrucaria macrostoma f. furfuracea, and Xanthoria cf. calcicola. The species is known from the Black Sea region of the Crimean Peninsula and Crete in the eastern Mediterranean.
