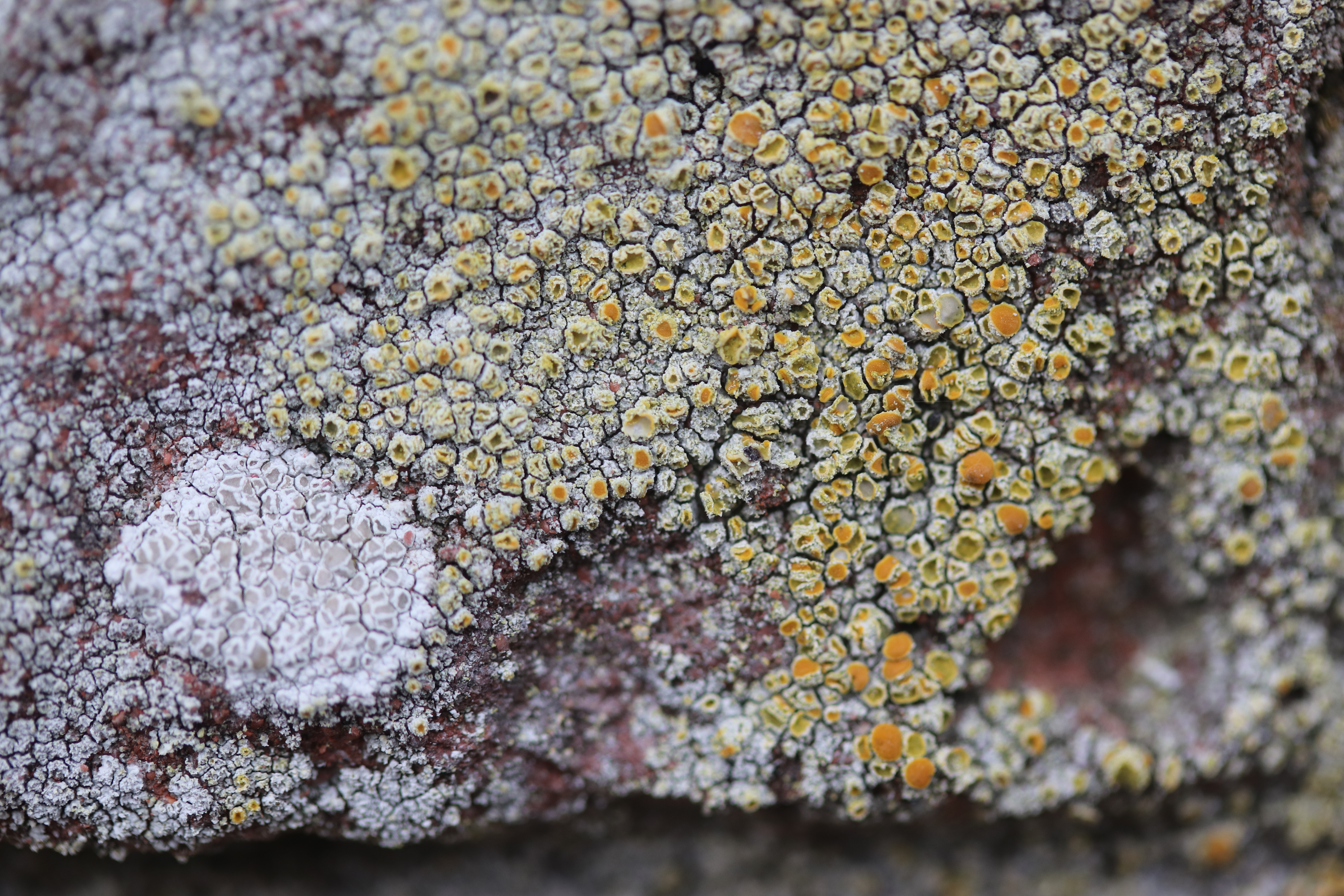

Scientific classification
- Domain: Eukaryota
- Kingdom: Fungi
- Division: Ascomycota
- Class: Lecanoromycetes
- Order: Teloschistales
- Family: Teloschistaceae
- Genus: Flavoplaca
- Species: F. limonia

Binomial name
- Flavoplaca limonia (Nimis & Poelt) Arup, Frödén & Søchting (2013)

Synonyms
- Caloplaca limonia Nimis & Poelt (1994)

= Flavoplaca limonia =

Species of lichen

Flavoplaca limonia is a species of saxicolous (rock-dwelling), crustose lichen in the family Teloschistaceae. It was first formally described as a new species in 1994 by lichenologists Pier Luigi Nimis and Josef Poelt. Ulf Arup and colleagues transferred the taxon to the genus Flavoplaca in 2013, following a molecular phylogenetics-based restructuring of the family Teloschistaceae.

Initially thought to be a southern European species, it has since been shown to have a broader distribution, having been reported from Morocco, Denmark, and Sweden. It can be differentiated from the similar-looking species Flavoplaca citrina by having larger diaspores, which are blastidia rather than soredia, averaging 85±54 μm in size.

== Description ==
Caloplaca limonia is a crustose lichen species characterised by its wide-spreading thallus (main body) that can reach up to 10 cm in diameter. Initially pale yellow in colour, the thallus develops a distinctive cracked-areolate pattern, with thin, relatively flat segments (areoles) measuring about 1–2 mm across. These areoles have irregular shapes and often display finely crenulated (scalloped) to slightly lobed margins, particularly at the edges of the thallus.

A distinctive feature of this species is its early and abundant development of yellow blastidia (small vegetative propagules) across the surface of the areoles. These blastidia are relatively large (40–80 μm in diameter) and irregularly rounded, giving the thallus a distinctive textured appearance. The blastidia have an incomplete protective layer of fungal hyphae (cortex) and are covered with relatively large crystals that dissolve completely in hydrochloric acid.

The reproductive structures (apothecia) are scattered and sparse. They first appear partially immersed in the thallus, later becoming more prominent with a constricted base. The apothecia are relatively thick, measuring about 0.5–1 mm in diameter, and round in shape. They have a flat, light brown disc surrounded by a thick margin that initially matches the colour of the disc. As the apothecia mature, they develop a zeorine structure (having both a proper margin and a thalline margin), with the proper margin becoming thinner and coloured like the disc, while the thicker outer thalline margin, initially smooth, may develop blastidia.

Internally, the hymenium (reproductive layer) measures about 100 μm in height. The paraphyses (sterile filaments between reproductive cells) are loosely arranged, about 1.5 μm thick, with the uppermost 2–3 cells becoming progressively swollen. The apical cells reach about 8 μm in thickness and are more or less spherical, covered with granular deposits. The spores number eight per ascus (spore-producing sac) but have very irregular forms, ranging from narrowly to broadly elliptical or almost rounded, measuring 8–16 by 4–8 μm, with thick cross-walls (septa) measuring 3–5 μm.
