= Haloplaca =

Scientific classification
- Domain: Eukaryota
- Kingdom: Fungi
- Division: Ascomycota
- Class: Lecanoromycetes
- Order: Teloschistales
- Family: Teloschistaceae
- Genus: Haloplaca; Arup, Søchting & Frödén (2013)

Type species
- Haloplaca britannica (R.Sant.) Arup, Frödén & Søchting (2013)

Species
- H. britannica H. sorediella H. suaedae

Genus of lichens

Haloplaca is a genus of lichen-forming fungi in the subfamily Teloschistaceae of the family Teloschistaceae. It contains three species of crustose lichens. The genus was circumscribed by Ulf Arup and colleagues in 2013, with Haloplaca britannica assigned as the type species. The genus name alludes to the preference of its species for salt-rich environments. All three species occur in the United Kingdom, but H. suaedae also occurs in Greece, Morocco and Turkey. Haloplaca species occur near the sea, either on rocks or on plant debris.

== Description ==
The thallus (the vegetative tissue of lichens) of Haloplaca is typically crustose; in some species, the margin may extend slightly outward, giving it a more distinct shape. The colour ranges from yellow to pale yellow, and in certain instances, it can appear greyish. Frequently, the surface may be covered in small grain-like structures or soredia, which are reproductive structures in lichens. The cortex, or the outer protective layer, is either not well-defined or is made up of interwoven (paraplectenchymatous) fungal tissues, which might be a special kind of cortex termed a phenocortex. The apothecia, which are disc-like structures where the lichen produces spores, are zeorine in form, though they might be absent in some species. The spores are polaridiblastic, meaning they develop in a way that the two ends are distinct, and have a medium-length dividing wall or septum. Pycnidia, which are small fruiting bodies for asexual reproduction, are observed in one species, H. suaedae. The spores produced in the pycnidia, known as conidia, are oval or slightly elongated in shape.

== Species ==
- Haloplaca britannica (R.Sant.) Arup, Frödén & Søchting (2013)
- Haloplaca sorediella (Arup) Arup, Frödén & Søchting (2013)
- Haloplaca suaedae (O.L.Gilbert & Coppins) Arup, Frödén & Søchting (2013)
