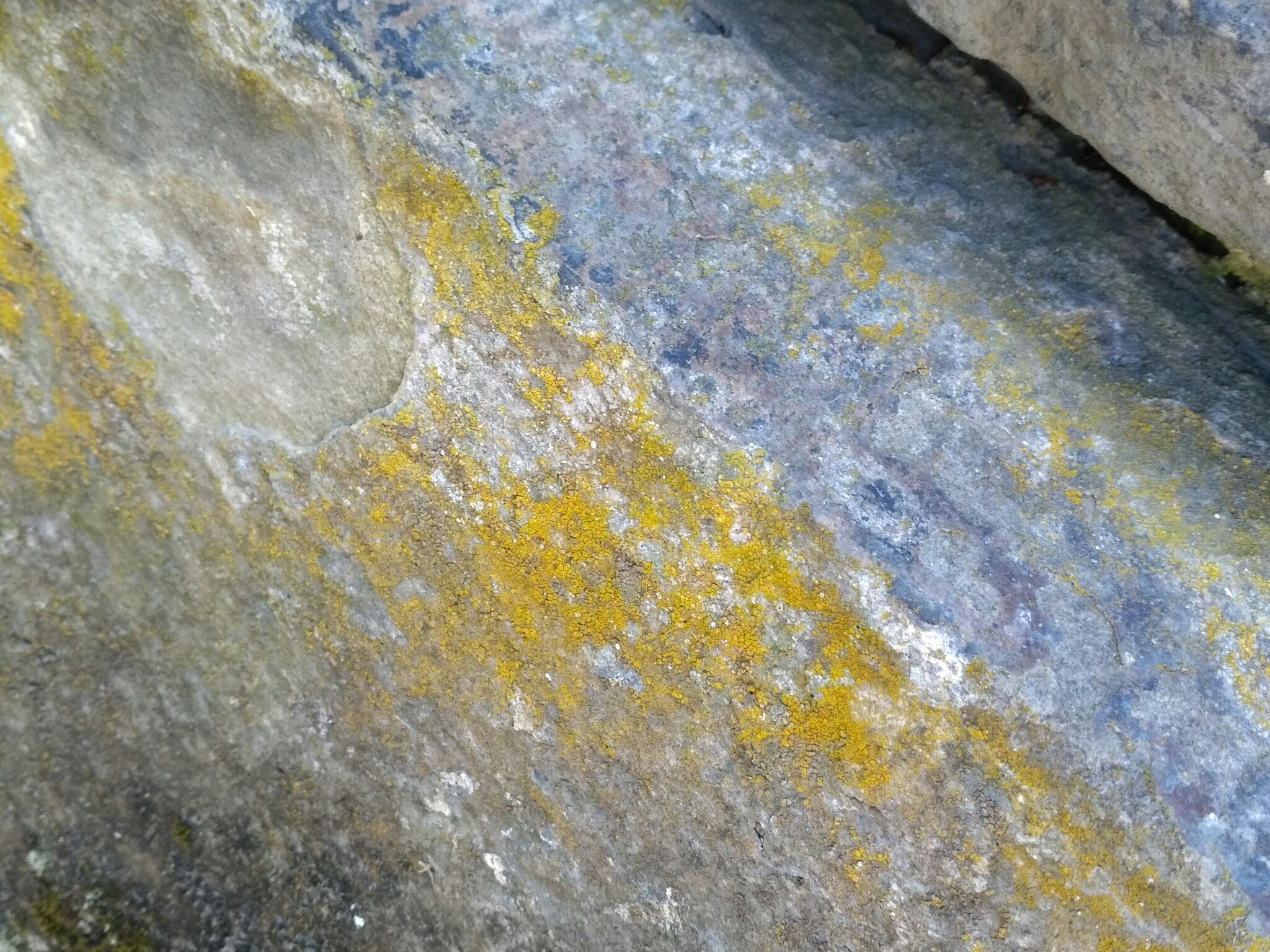

Scientific classification
- Domain: Eukaryota
- Kingdom: Fungi
- Division: Ascomycota
- Class: Lecanoromycetes
- Order: Teloschistales
- Family: Teloschistaceae
- Genus: Flavoplaca
- Species: F. austrocitrina

Binomial name
- Flavoplaca austrocitrina (Vondrák, Říha, Arup & Søchting) Arup, Søchting & Frödén (2013)

Synonyms
- Caloplaca austrocitrina Vondrák, Říha, Arup & Søchting (2009)

= Flavoplaca austrocitrina =

Species of lichen

Flavoplaca austrocitrina is a species of saxicolous (rock-dwelling), crustose lichen in the family Teloschistaceae. It is widely distributed in Europe, and has also been recorded in South America.

== Taxonomy ==
The lichen was first formally described as a new species in 2009 by lichenologists Jan Vondrák, Pavel Říha, Ulf Arup, and Ulrik Søchting, who initially classified it in the genus Caloplaca. The species epithet alludes to its European distribution. The taxon has since been transferred to genus Flavoplaca in 2013, following a molecular phylogenetics-based restructuring of the Teloschistaceae.

== Description ==
Caloplaca austrocitrina is characterised by a thallus that predominantly shows a yellow hue, though in some cases it can appear orange. The thallus is either areolate or composed of closely packed squamules. These squamules or areoles are typically thick, ranging from 80 to 380 μm, and they have a width that varies between 0.25 and 1.7 mm. The squamules themselves are flat and smooth, with marginal soralia of the flavocitrina type. In older thalli, the soralia may expand to cover the entire surface.

The soredia of Caloplaca austrocitrina are sized approximately 22 to 61 μm in diameter and can cluster into consoredia. The cortex or alveolate (honeybombed) cortex of the lichen is well-developed, with a thickness spanning from 6 to 40 μm.

About half of the specimens of this species bear apothecia, which are about 0.32 to 0.65 mm in diameter. The disc of the mature apothecia can range from flat to convex. The exciple, which surrounds the apothecia, measures between 50 and 130 μm in thickness and has a zeorine structure. In younger apothecia, the thalline exciple tends to be concealed beneath the true margin, while in older specimens, it is well-developed and persists. The hymenium of Caloplaca austrocitrina has a thickness of 60 to 80 μm. The tips of the paraphyses are widened, measuring between 3.0 and 6.0 μm.

The ascospores of the species are approximately 8.5 to 14.0 μm long and 4.5 to 6.5 μm wide. The septa of these spores are around 3.0 to 5.5 μm thick, accounting for nearly 0.4 of the total ascospore length. The conidia of Caloplaca austrocitrina are small, typically measuring between 2.0 and 4.0 μm in length and 1.0 to 1.5 μm in width, contributing to the distinctive microscopic features of this lichen species.

== Habitat, distribution, and ecology ==
Flavoplaca austrocitrina, initially described from specimens collected in Ukraine, has an ecology in the Buenos Aires region of Argentina that is quite similar to its European counterparts. Predominantly, this lichen is found growing on cement mortar and concrete within urban and village settings. Cement mortar – a hardened mixture of cement, sand, and water – serves as a common substrate for this species, distinguishing it from other types of mortars like lime mortar. Flavoplaca austrocitrina often establishes itself in proximity to aquatic environments, including rivers, lakes, and coastal areas.

Flavoplaca austrocitrina has been identified in various European countries, including Austria, Bulgaria, Germany, Greece, the Czech Republic, Romania, Russia, and Slovakia. The discovery of this species in South America, coupled with its established presence in Europe, suggests a potential for a wider global distribution. The Argentine specimens have nearly identical internal transcribed spacer (ITS) sequences to their European counterparts, despite the geographical distance. This low variation in the ITS locus is noteworthy within the genus, especially considering the separation between the South American and European populations. Flavoplaca austrocitrina has been identified as one of several saxicolous lichens responsible for the biofouling of crypts of historical and architectural interest at La Plata Cemetery in Argentina.
