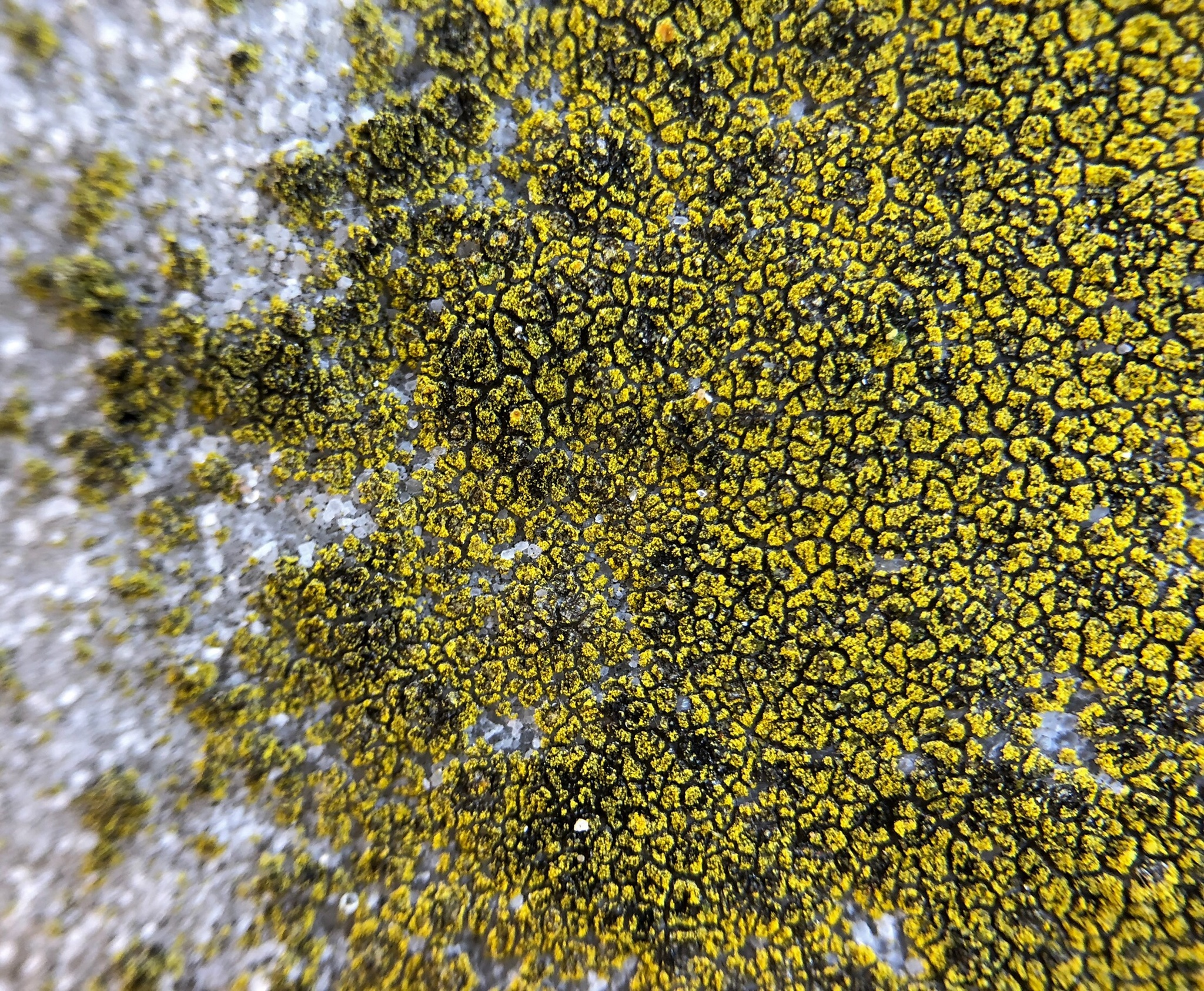
- Flavoplaca flavocitrina

Scientific classification
- Kingdom: Fungi
- Division: Ascomycota
- Class: Lecanoromycetes
- Order: Teloschistales
- Family: Teloschistaceae
- Genus: Flavoplaca; Arup, Søchting & Frödén (2013)

Type species
- Flavoplaca citrina (Hoffm.) Arup, Frödén & Søchting (2013)

= Flavoplaca =

Genus of lichen

Flavoplaca is a genus of crust-like or scaly lichens in the family Teloschistaceae. It has about 30 species with a mostly Northern Hemisphere distribution. The genus was established in 2013 when genetic studies revealed that these species formed their own distinct evolutionary group, separate from other lichen classifications where they were previously placed. These lichens typically grow on limestone and other calcium-rich rocks, forming distinctive orange to yellow crusty patches that are particularly common in coastal environments and sunny locations. Most species grow directly on rock surfaces, but unusually for lichens, four species in the genus are parasitic and live on other lichen species instead.

== Taxonomy ==
The genus was circumscribed in 2013 by Ulf Arup, Patrik Frödén and Ulrik Søchting, with Flavoplaca citrina as the type species. The genus formed a well-supported clade in molecular phylogenetics analysis. Flavoplaca species are closely related to Calogaya species that have lobes. There are other genera with roughly similar morphological features as Flavoplaca (examples include Polycauliona, Orientophila, Sirenophila, and Villophora), but they are genetically different and have different distributions. Arup and colleagues included 26 species in the genus; most were originally named as members of the genera Caloplaca or Lecanora.

Recent molecular studies have continued to refine the taxonomy of the genus. In 2024, three additional species were transferred to Flavoplaca based on phylogenetic analysis: F. ruderum, F. itiana, and F. sol. These transfers helped resolve several taxonomic uncertainties within the group. F. ruderum was found to be closely related to F. communis, F. maritima, and F. havaasii, forming a well-supported clade within the genus. The study also clarified historical confusion surrounding the identities of F. itiana, F. calcitrapa, and Caloplaca dalmatica, demonstrating that some specimens previously identified as C. dalmatica actually represent F. itiana.

== Description ==
Flavoplaca species have a thallus that is either crust-like (crustose) or scaly (squamulose), sometimes with indistinct edges, and sometimes with lobes. They often have apothecia, and these are zeorine, meaning that the proper exciple (the ring-shaped layer surrounding the hymenium) is enclosed in the thalline exciple. Pycnidia can be present or absent; the conidia have a bacilliform to ellipsoid shape.

The morphology of species within the genus can vary significantly. Some species, such as F. ruderum, display a distinctive uneven thallus composed of strongly convex to verruculose or almost globose (spherical) areoles that can sometimes appear almost squamulose. The presence of pruina (a powdery or waxy surface coating) varies among populations and species; for example, Swedish specimens of F. ruderum show less pruinosity than their British counterparts. The apothecia are typically large and zeorine in structure.

Four Flavoplaca species are lichenicolous; that is, they grow on other lichens. These are F. coronata (on saxicolous lichens), F. microthallina (on saxicolous lichens, commonly Hydropunctaria maura), F. oasis (on saxicolous lichens, particularly Bagliettoa calciseda), and F. polycarpa (on Bagliettoa). Only F. polycarpa has a truly lichenicolous mode of life; the others are facultatively lichenicolous, i.e., commonly collected from lichens but also known to grow on non-lichen substrates.

The genus shows distinct ecological preferences, with many species favouring calcareous substrates. Some species are specifically adapted to coastal environments, while others prefer inland habitats. For example, F. ruderum typically grows on soft calcareous walls and mortar, particularly in well-lit locations, while related species like F. communis and F. maritima are largely confined to seashore rocks or coastal areas with high salinity exposure.

== Species ==
Most Flavoplaca species occur in the Northern Hemisphere, and many are found in Europe. As of December 2024, Species Fungorum accepts 28 species of Flavoplaca:

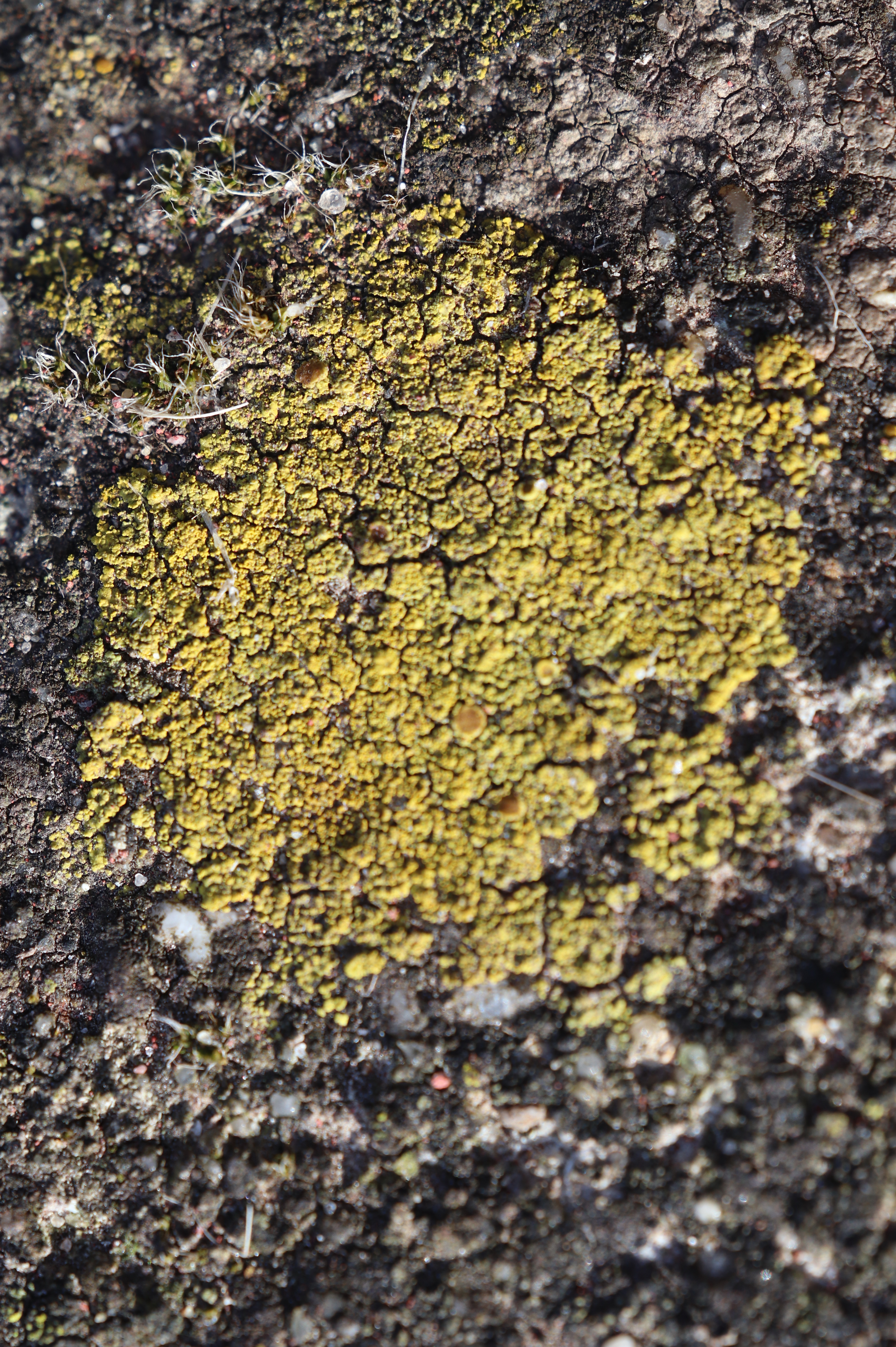
Flavoplaca arcis

- Flavoplaca arcis (Poelt & Vězda) Arup, Frödén & Søchting (2013)
- Flavoplaca arcisproxima (Vondrák, Říha, Arup & Søchting) Arup, Søchting & Frödén (2013)
- Flavoplaca austrocitrina (Vondrák, Říha, Arup & Søchting) Arup, Søchting & Frödén (2013)
- Flavoplaca calcitrapa (Nav.-Ros., Gaya & Cl.Roux) Arup, Frödén & Søchting (2013)
- Flavoplaca citrina (Hoffm.) Arup, Frödén & Søchting (2013)
- Flavoplaca communis (Vondrák, Říha, Arup & Søchting) Arup, Søchting & Frödén (2013)
- Flavoplaca confusa (Vondrák, Říha, Arup & Søchting) Arup, Søchting & Frödén (2013)
- Flavoplaca coronata (Kremp. ex Körb.) Arup, Frödén & Søchting (2013)
- Flavoplaca cranfieldii (S.Y.Kondr. & Kärnefelt) Arup, Frödén & Søchting (2013)
- Flavoplaca dichroa (Arup) Arup, Frödén & Søchting (2013)
- Flavoplaca flavocitrina (Nyl.) Arup, Frödén & Søchting (2013)
- Flavoplaca geleverjae (Khodos. & S.Y.Kondr.) Arup, Frödén & Søchting (2013)
- Flavoplaca granulosa (Müll.Arg.) Arup, Frödén & Søchting (2013)
- Flavoplaca havaasii (H.Magn.) Arup, Frödén & Søchting (2013)
- Flavoplaca itiana (Cl.Roux, M.Boulanger & Malle) Arup & Søchting (2023)
- Flavoplaca kantvilasii (S.Y.Kondr. & Kärnefelt) Arup, Frödén & Søchting (2013)
- Flavoplaca laszloana S.Y.Kondr. & Hur (2017)
- Flavoplaca limonia (Nimis & Poelt) Arup, Frödén & Søchting (2013)
- Flavoplaca lutea (J.R.Laundon) S.Y.Kondr., Kärnefelt, Elix, A.Thell, Jung Kim, M.H.Jeong, N.N.Yu, A.S. Kondr. & Hur (2014)
- Flavoplaca marina (Wedd.) Arup, Frödén & Søchting (2013)
- Flavoplaca maritima (B.de Lesd.) Arup, Frödén & Søchting (2013)
- Flavoplaca mereschkowskiana (S.Y.Kondr. & Kärnefelt) Arup, Frödén & Søchting (2013)
- Flavoplaca microthallina (Wedd.) Arup, Frödén & Søchting (2013)
- Flavoplaca navasiana (Nav.-Ros. & Cl.Roux) Arup, Søchting & Frödén (2013)
- Flavoplaca nigromarina (Vondrák, Říha, Arup & Søchting) Arup, Søchting & Frödén (2013)
- Flavoplaca oasis (A.Massal.) Arup, Frödén & Søchting (2013)
- Flavoplaca ora (Poelt & Nimis) Arup, Frödén & Søchting (2013)
- Flavoplaca polycarpa (A.Massal.) Arup, Frödén & Søchting (2013)
- Flavoplaca ruderum (Malbr.) Arup & Søchting (2024)
- Flavoplaca sol (Orange) Arup & Søchting (2024)
- Flavoplaca tavaresiana (Nav.-Ros. & Cl.Roux) Arup, Frödén & Søchting (2013)
