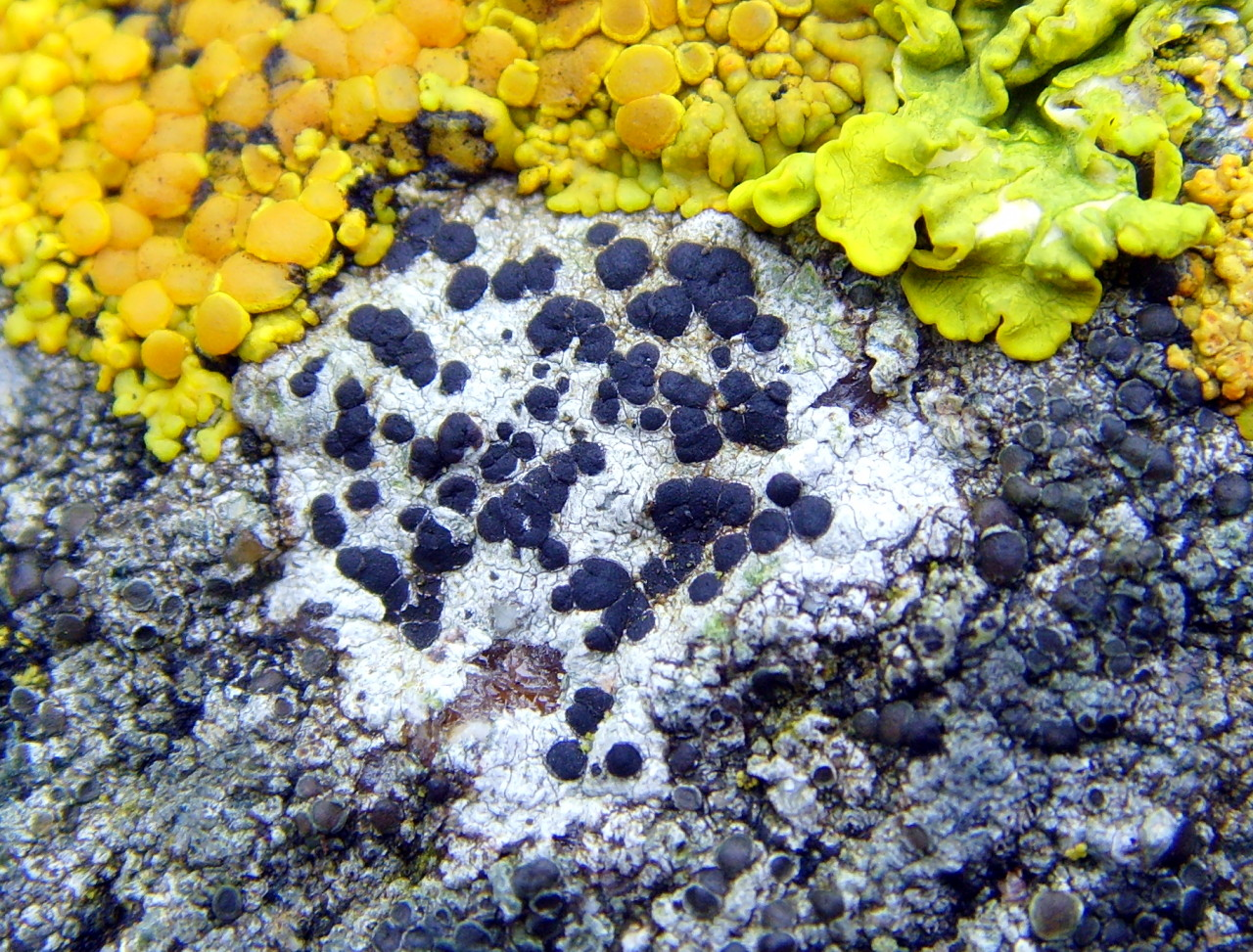
- Diplotomma chlorophaeum

Scientific classification
- Domain: Eukaryota
- Kingdom: Fungi
- Division: Ascomycota
- Class: Lecanoromycetes
- Order: Caliciales
- Family: Caliciaceae
- Genus: Diplotomma; Flot. (1849)

Type species
- Diplotomma alboatrum (Hoffm.) Flot. (1849)

Synonyms
- Abacina Norman (1852)

= Diplotomma =

Genus of lichens in the family Caliciaceae

Diplotomma is a genus of lichen-forming fungi in the family Caliciaceae. The genus has a widespread distribution and contains 14 species. These lichens form firmly attached, crust-like patches that range from pale to dark grey and can appear smooth or cracked into an irregular mosaic pattern on their substrate. They produce black, disc-shaped fruiting bodies that start buried in the crust and later emerge to sit roughly flush with the surface, often dusted with a greyish-white powder.

== Taxonomy ==
The genus was circumscribed by Julius von Flotow in 1849. It was later wrapped into Buellia before being segregated from that genus by David Hawksworth in 1980.

== Description ==
Diplotomma species form a firmly attached, crust-like thallus that sits on the substrate as a clearly delimited patch; in a few lichen-inhabiting (lichenicolous) taxa the thallus may be very thin or partly immersed in the host. The surface ranges from pale to dark grey and can appear smooth or cracked into an irregular mosaic. A dense outer cortex is packed with minute crystals that remain intact when a fragment is placed in potassium hydroxide solution (the K test). The algal partner (photobiont) is a single-celled green alga of the chlorococcoid type, which provides photosynthetic energy.

The sexual fruit-bodies (apothecia) start out buried in the thallus and later emerge so that the black disc sits roughly flush with the surface; a narrow, pale, scalloped rim of thallus tissue may encircle the disc in some species. The disc itself is often dusted with a greyish-white powder (pruina). Microscopic examination shows only a rudimentary true exciple, merging seamlessly with the underlying hypothecium, both of which are brown to nearly black. Thread-like paraphyses stand in the clear (I+ blue) hymenium; their tips swell and darken, giving the layer a tufted look. Each sac-like ascus contains eight ascospores that are divided by cross-walls into two or more cells (sometimes almost forming a brick pattern, submuriform) and have thick internal partitions (distosepta); mature spores are mid- to dark brown with rounded internal chambers (lumina). Vegetative reproduction occurs in sunken, flask-shaped pycnidia that appear as tiny brown dots; these release colourless, oval conidia capable of starting new thalli. Chemically the genus is characterised by aromatic depsides, compounds that help separate its species from superficially similar grey crustose lichens.

== Selected species ==
As of June 2025, Species Fungorum (in the Catalogue of Life) accepts 14 species of Diplotomma:

- Diplotomma alboatrum (Hoffm.) Flot. (1849)
- Diplotomma cedricola (Werner) Etayo (2010)
- Diplotomma chlorophaeum Szatala (1956)
- Diplotomma epipolium (Ach.) Arnold (1869)
- Diplotomma glaucoatrum (Nyl.) Cl.Roux (2015)
- Diplotomma hedinii (H.Magn.) P.Clerc & Cl.Roux (2004)
- Diplotomma murorum (A.Massal.) Coppins (1980)
- Diplotomma niveum (Anzi) Szatala (1956)
- Diplotomma parasiticum (B.de Lesd.) Diederich, Cl.Roux & Haluwyn (2014)
- Diplotomma pharcidium (Ach.) M.Choisy (1950)
- Diplotomma porphyricum Arnold (1872)
- Diplotomma rivas-martinezii (Barreno & A.Crespo) Barreno & A.Crespo (2000)
- Diplotomma venustum (Körb.) Körb. (1860)
- Diplotomma vezdanum (P.Scholz & Knoph) Coppins (2002)
