= Flavoplaca dichroa =

Scientific classification
- Domain: Eukaryota
- Kingdom: Fungi
- Division: Ascomycota
- Class: Lecanoromycetes
- Order: Teloschistales
- Family: Teloschistaceae
- Genus: Flavoplaca
- Species: F. dichroa

Binomial name
- Flavoplaca dichroa (Arup) Arup, Frödén & Søchting (2013)

Synonyms
- Caloplaca dichroa Arup (2006)

Species of lichen

Flavoplaca dichroa is a species of crustose lichen in the family Teloschistaceae. Found in Europe, it was described as a new species in 2006 by Ulf Arup, who classified it as a member of the genus Caloplaca. It was reclassified to Flavoplaca in 2013 following a molecular phylogenetics-informed reorganization of the Teloschistaceae in 2013.
