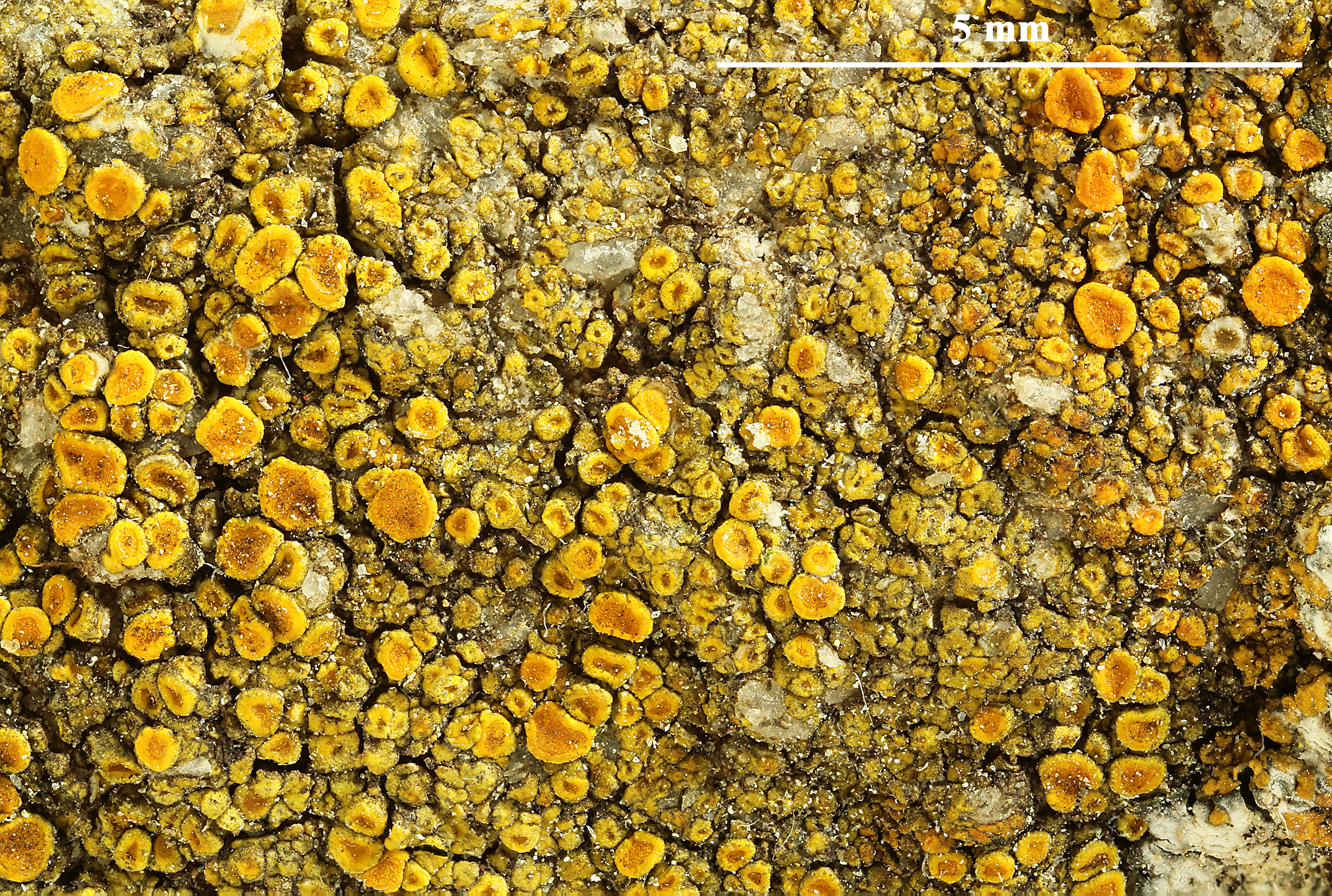

Scientific classification
- Domain: Eukaryota
- Kingdom: Fungi
- Division: Ascomycota
- Class: Lecanoromycetes
- Order: Teloschistales
- Family: Teloschistaceae
- Genus: Flavoplaca
- Species: F. calcitrapa

Binomial name
- Flavoplaca calcitrapa (Nav.-Ros., Gaya & Cl.Roux) Arup, Frödén & Søchting (2013)

Synonyms
- Caloplaca calcitrapa Nav.-Ros., Gaya & Cl.Roux (2000)

= Flavoplaca calcitrapa =

Species of lichen

Flavoplaca calcitrapa is a species of crustose lichen in the family Teloschistaceae. Found in Europe, it was described as a new species in 2000 by the lichenologists Pere Navarro-Rosinés, Ester Gaya, and Claude Roux, as a member of the genus Caloplaca. It was reclassified in genus Flavoplaca in 2013.
