= Flavoplaca itiana =

Scientific classification
- Kingdom: Fungi
- Division: Ascomycota
- Class: Lecanoromycetes
- Order: Teloschistales
- Family: Teloschistaceae
- Genus: Flavoplaca
- Species: F. itiana

Binomial name
- Flavoplaca itiana (Cl.Roux, M.Boulanger & Malle) Arup & Søchting (2023)

Synonyms
- Caloplaca itiana Cl.Roux (2009); Athallia itiana (Cl.Roux, M.Boulanger & Malle) Cl.Roux (2022)

Species of lichen-forming fungus

Flavoplaca itiana is a species of saxicolous (rock-dwelling) crustose lichen in the family Teloschistaceae. It has a thin, whitish crust that is often largely embedded in the rock, with yellow-orange to orange fruiting bodies typically 0.2–0.8 mm across. The species is known only from calcareous sandstone cliffs along the English Channel coast in the Boulonnais region of northern France, where it forms distinct zones just above the black Hydropunctaria maura belt. It closely resembles the Mediterranean species Flavoplaca navasiana but differs in having larger spores and occupying a higher position in the coastal zonation. The species was originally described as Caloplaca itiana in 2009 and transferred to Flavoplaca in 2023.

== Taxonomy ==
Flavoplaca itiana was described as Caloplaca itiana in 2009 by Claude Roux, Marc Boulanger and Nicolas Malle, based on coastal collections from the Boulonnais (Pas-de-Calais, northern France). The epithet itiana refers to Itius, an old Latin name associated with Boulogne-sur-Mer. In later taxonomic work it was transferred to the genus Athallia in 2022. Ulf Arup and Ulrik Søchting used nrITS phylogenetic evidence to place the species in Flavoplaca, and published the new combination Flavoplaca itiana, replacing its 2022 transfer to Athallia that was made without DNA-based analysis.

In the original description, the species was reported as a saxicolous, calcicolous maritime lichen whose overall appearance and ecology closely resemble the mainly Mediterranean coastal species Flavoplaca navasiana. It was separated from that species chiefly by microscopic characters (including larger asci and ascospores, slightly more expanded paraphyses tips, and a thicker parathecium), as well as by its position in coastal zonation (upper supralittoral rather than adlittoral) and its more northerly distribution. The holotype was collected at Cap Gris-Nez (Audinghen) on a coherent calcareous sandstone surface just above the Hydropunctaria maura zone, at about 5 to 10 m (16 to 33 ft) above sea level. The authors also suggested that some records of Athallia holocarpa from maritime calcareous rocks in the Boulonnais probably represent misidentified A. itiana.

== Description ==
The thallus is crustose and largely endolithic, often indistinct, but it may develop as a very thin to thin epilithic crust that is cracked to finely areolate; in places it can be reduced to a few granules between the fruiting bodies. It is usually whitish, sometimes yellowish, and may look greyish-white when epiphytic cyanobacteria are present. In spot tests the thallus is typically K−, only occasionally becoming faintly orange with a weak K+ (purple) reaction. The photobiont is a trebouxioid green alga with cells about 5–14 μm in diameter.

The apothecia (fruiting bodies) are common but usually not densely crowded, about 0.2–0.8 mm across, and yellow-orange to orange; they are K+ (purple). The disc is finely roughened and can be slightly pruinose (parietin crystals), becoming flat and finally slightly convex with age. The proper margin is smooth and the same colour as the thallus (or slightly paler), about 0.02–0.05 mm thick, and becomes thin and level with the disc; a thalline margin is absent.

Microscopically, the epithecium (the uppermost layer of the fruiting body) is yellow-brown and reacts K+ (purple), while the hymenium (spore-producing layer) is hyaline (colourless) and about 60–80 μm tall. The paraphyses (sterile filaments among the spore-bearing cells) are distinctly septate and mostly unbranched (or once branched near the tip), about 1.5–2 μm thick at the base and 5–8 μm at the swollen apex, where one to two terminal cells bear anthraquinone crystals that turn purple with potassium hydroxide (K+ purple). The asci (spore-bearing sacs) are club-shaped (clavate) and contain eight spores, measuring 43–62 × 11–19 μm. The ascospores are colourless, ellipsoid, and polarilocular (divided into two compartments by a thickened central wall), mostly 13–15 μm long and 5.5–7 μm wide (with extremes of 10.5–16 × 4.5–8.5 μm), with the equatorial thickening (septum) typically 4.5–7 μm long (rarely to 4 or 8 μm).

== Habitat and distribution ==
In the protologue, Athallia itiana was known only from the calcareous coast of the English Channel in the Boulonnais, where it is common on firm, coherent calcareous sandstone rocks. It occurs immediately above the zone dominated by Hydropunctaria maura, forming largely monospecific stands described as a distinct A. itiana zone in the upper supralittoral. At the lowest edge of this zone it mixes with H. maura and may also occur with other maritime Teloschistaceae such as Variospora thallincola and C. microthallina.

The same account pointed out that suitable Jurassic limestones (often somewhat sandstone-like) are a feature of the Boulonnais and are thought to explain why the species is confined to that stretch of the Channel coast. Collections cited came from Audinghen (Cap Gris-Nez and nearby sites) and Équihen-Plage (including the south flank of Cap d'Alprech).
