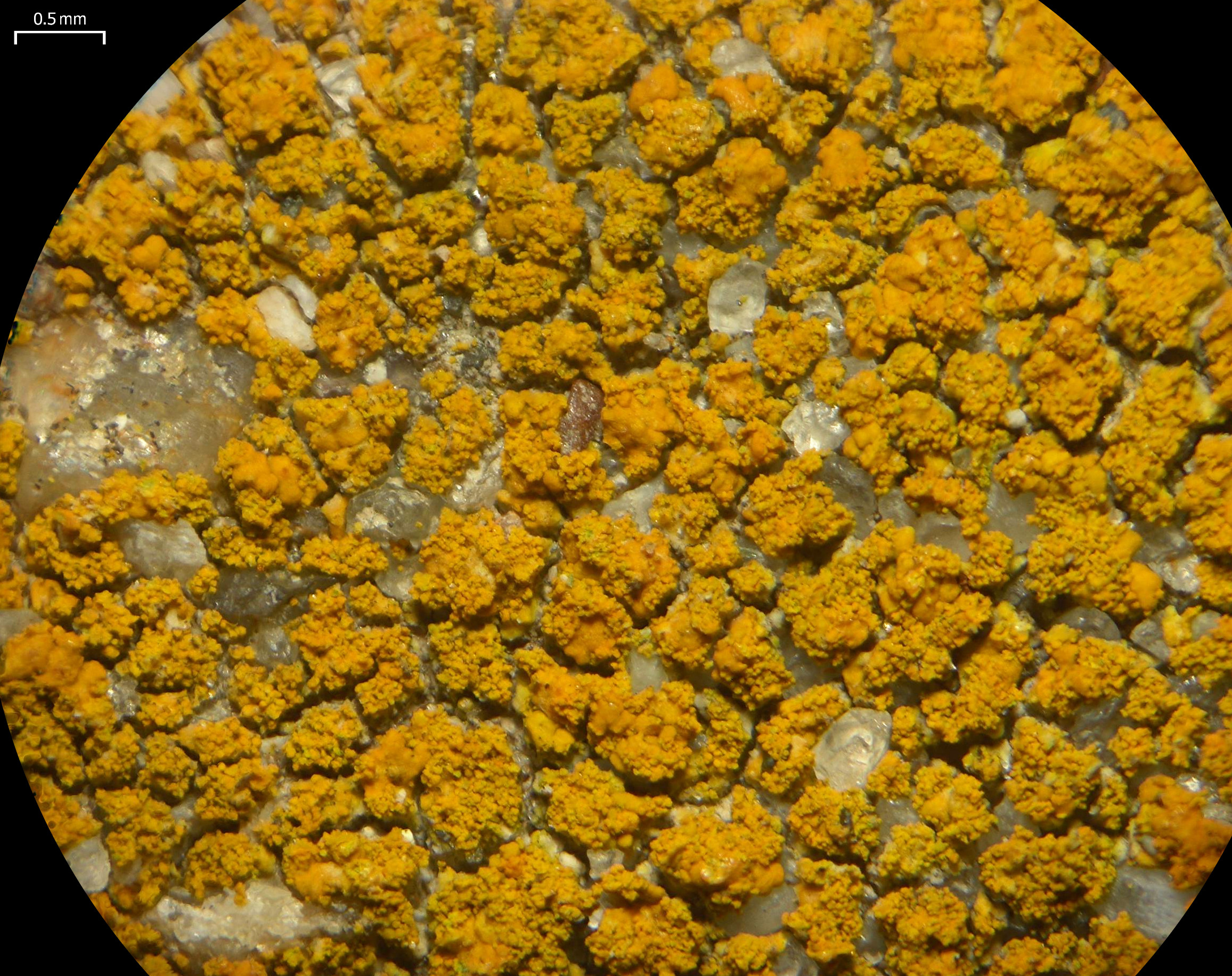

Scientific classification
- Kingdom: Fungi
- Division: Ascomycota
- Class: Lecanoromycetes
- Order: Teloschistales
- Family: Teloschistaceae
- Genus: Flavoplaca
- Species: F. flavocitrina

Binomial name
- Flavoplaca flavocitrina (Nyl.) Arup, Frödén & Søchting 2013

Synonyms
- Lecanora flavocitrina Nyl. (1886); Caloplaca flavocitrina (Nyl.) H.Olivier (1909); Lecidea flavocitrina (Nyl.) Hue (1914); Placodium citrinum f. flavocitrinum (Nyl.) Walt.Watson (1918); Placodium citrinum var. flavocitrinum (Nyl.) A.L.Sm. (1918); Caloplaca citrina var. flavocitrina (Nyl.) Walt.Watson (1945)

= Flavoplaca flavocitrina =

Species of lichen-forming fungus

Flavoplaca flavocitrina is a species of crustose lichen in the family Teloschistaceae. Found in Europe, it was originally described as a new species in 1886 by the Finnish lichenologist William Nylander, who classified it as a member of the genus Lecanora. After having spent time in various different genera throughout its taxonomic history, it was reclassified in the genus Flavoplaca in 2013 following a molecular phylogenetics-informed reorganization of the Teloschistaceae.

On the Commander Islands (Russian Far East), Flavoplaca flavocitrina has been recorded from four coastal sites on siliceous rock outcrops and from one tundra locality where it grew on a concrete structure. More generally, it is a widely distributed Holarctic species that is also known from Australia, and it is reported to be very common along seacoasts in the southern Russian Far East.
