= Haloplaca suaedae =

Scientific classification
- Domain: Eukaryota
- Kingdom: Fungi
- Division: Ascomycota
- Class: Lecanoromycetes
- Order: Teloschistales
- Family: Teloschistaceae
- Genus: Haloplaca
- Species: H. suaedae

Binomial name
- Haloplaca suaedae (O.L.Gilbert & Coppins) Arup, Frödén & Søchting (2013)

Synonyms
- Caloplaca suaedae O.L.Gilbert & Coppins (2001)

Species of lichen

Haloplaca suaedae is a species of epiphytic (plant-dwelling), crustose lichen in the family Teloschistaceae. It grows exclusively as an epiphyte on shrubby sea-blite (Suaeda vera). First described in 2001 as Caloplaca suaedae, it was later reclassified in the genus Haloplaca. The lichen is characterised by its extensive grey-green to pale grey thallus composed of small, warty segments, and numerous small orange apothecia (fruiting bodies) with distinctive yellow rims. Found primarily in coastal salt marsh environments and around saline lagoons, it has been documented in England, Greece, Morocco, and Turkey, where it is adaptated to periodic salt water inundation.

== Taxonomy ==
It was formally described as a new species in 2001 by the lichenologists Oliver L. Gilbert and Brian John Coppins, who initially classified it in the genus Caloplaca. Ulf Arup and colleagues transferred it to the newly created genus Haloplaca in 2013, as part of a larger molecular phylogenetics-informed restructuring of the Teloschistaceae. The type specimen was collected in Dorset (South West England), at The Fleet along Chesil Beach (grid reference 30/668756) at sea level. It was found growing epiphytically on Suaeda vera beside a saline lagoon on 19 September 2000. The species name suaedae refers to its only known host.

== Description ==
Haloplaca suaedae is a lichen characterised by a well-developed thallus (the main body of the lichen) that spreads extensively across its host plant. The thallus is composed of coherent, convex areoles (small island-like segments) that often appear warty or granular, especially in shaded conditions. When observed at the edge of the thallus, these areoles are frequently flatter and more distinctly patterned (effigurate). The colouration ranges from grey-green in deep shade to more typically greenish grey or pale grey, becoming bright green when wet. Individual areoles measure 0.14–0.20 mm in diameter when discrete, though they may become smaller (0.06–0.1 mm) and more granular in deep shade.

The reproductive structures (apothecia) are small (0.2–0.4 mm in diameter), numerous and typically crowded together, often becoming angular or contorted due to mutual pressure. Initially concave, they soon become flat to weakly convex. Young apothecia display a greenish grey to pale grey rim (thalline exciple) that usually recedes, leaving a well-defined, persistent yellow rim (true exciple) that is always paler than the orange, non-powdery disc. Under microscopic examination, the spore-producing layer (hymenium) is 65–75 μm tall and transparent, lacking oil droplets or crystalline inclusions. The spores (ascospores) are distinctively narrowly ellipsoid and often curved or bow-shaped, measuring 12–14 by 4.5–4.8 μm, with a central partition (septum) of approximately 3.5–4 μm. When chemically tested, the thallus shows no reaction to potassium hydroxide solution (K−), while the yellow or orange pigments of the apothecia and around pycnidial openings turn purple when K is applied (K+ purple).

== Habitat and distribution ==
Haloplaca suaedae shows remarkable habitat specificity, having been documented exclusively as an epiphyte on shrubby sea-blite (Suaeda vera), a small shrub with a restricted distribution in coastal areas. The lichen has been recorded at the margins of saline lagoons in Dorset and around several lagoons and salt marshes along the Norfolk coast of England. Within these localities, C. suaedae can be locally abundant, particularly on mature specimens of Suaeda vera that grow in stands along the drift-line, reaching 1–2 m in height. The rough bark of these shrubs provides an ideal substrate for the lichen. Its presence on this host plant in salt marsh environments suggests an adaptation to periodic inundation with brackish or salt water during the highest spring tides, a challenging condition that few lichens can tolerate. Historical records indicate that this species has been present in these areas since at least the 1930s.

The ecological communities associated with C. suaedae typically include other salt-tolerant lichens such as Xanthoria parietina and Lecanora dispersa aggregate, along with occasional occurrences of Lecania cyrtella and Opegrapha atra. These species collectively form a distinctive epiphytic community adapted to the unique conditions at the interface between terrestrial and marine environments in sheltered coastal lagoon systems. In addition to England, it also occurs in Greece, Morocco, and Turkey.
