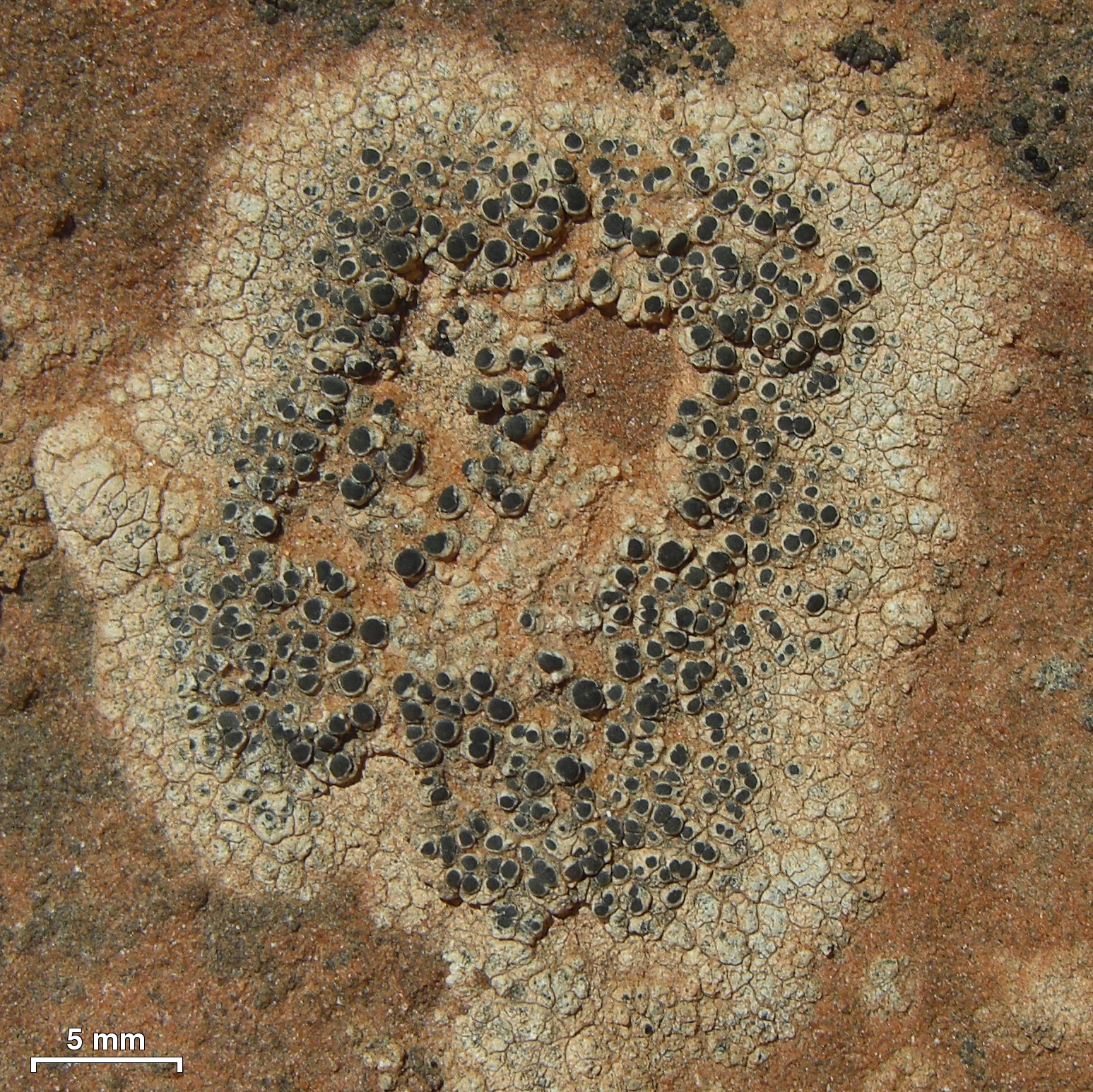

Scientific classification
- Kingdom: Fungi
- Division: Ascomycota
- Class: Lecanoromycetes
- Order: Caliciales
- Family: Caliciaceae
- Genus: Diplotomma
- Species: D. venustum

Binomial name
- Diplotomma venustum Körb. (1860)

Synonyms
- List: Rhizocarpon alboatrum var. venustum (Körb.) Anzi (1864); Buellia alboatra var. venusta (Körb.) Th.Fr. (1874); Lecidea alboatra var. venusta (Körb.) Vain. (1883); Diplotomma epipolium f. venustum (Körb.) Arnold (1884); Buellia epipolia var. venusta (Körb.) Mong. (1900); Lichen amylaceus var. venusta (Körb.) Mong. (1900); Buellia venusta (Körb.) Lettau (1913); Diplotomma epipolium var. venustum (Körb.) Szatala (1938); Buellia margaritacea var. venusta (Körb.) Räsänen (1943); Diplotomma alboatrum var. venustum Körb. (1858); Lecidea epipolia var. venusta Körb. ex Hepp (1860)

= Diplotomma venustum =

Species of lichen

Diplotomma venustum is a species of saxicolous (rock-dwelling) crustose lichen in the family Caliciaceae. It is widely distributed, having been recorded from all continents, where it grows on calcareous rocks.

== Taxonomy ==
The lichen was first formally described as a new species by German lichenologist Gustav Wilhelm Körber in 1860. Körber's Latin diagnosis emphasised the firmly attached, granular-powdery thallus with very fine wrinkling, and the mostly solitary apothecia that are immersed in the thallus when young but become convex with a black disc. He characterised the colourless ascospores as ellipsoidal to spindle-shaped with 4 cross-walls (4-septate) and noted they turn sooty-brown with age. The species was described from limestone and dolomite rocks in mountainous regions of central Europe, including collections from Germany, Austria, and the Carpathian Mountains.

== Description ==
Diplotomma venustum forms a crust-like thallus that is tightly attached to the substrate (crustose) and often broken up by numerous irregular cracks and fissures (rimose). The margin may become weakly lobed. A thin black border (the prothallus) is sometimes visible around the thallus. The upper surface is chalky white, grey, or ochre-tinged and lacks powdery vegetative propagules. The interior (medulla) is white and contains abundant needle-shaped crystals of calcium oxalate; these crystals also generate the fine white pruina that commonly dusts the fruiting discs. Under ultraviolet light the thallus does not fluoresce (UV−), and standard spot tests on the thallus and medulla are negative in North American material (K−, P−, C−); outside North America, some collections react K+ (yellow turning red) and P+ (yellow-orange), reflecting the presence of norstictic and connorstictic acids in the medulla.
