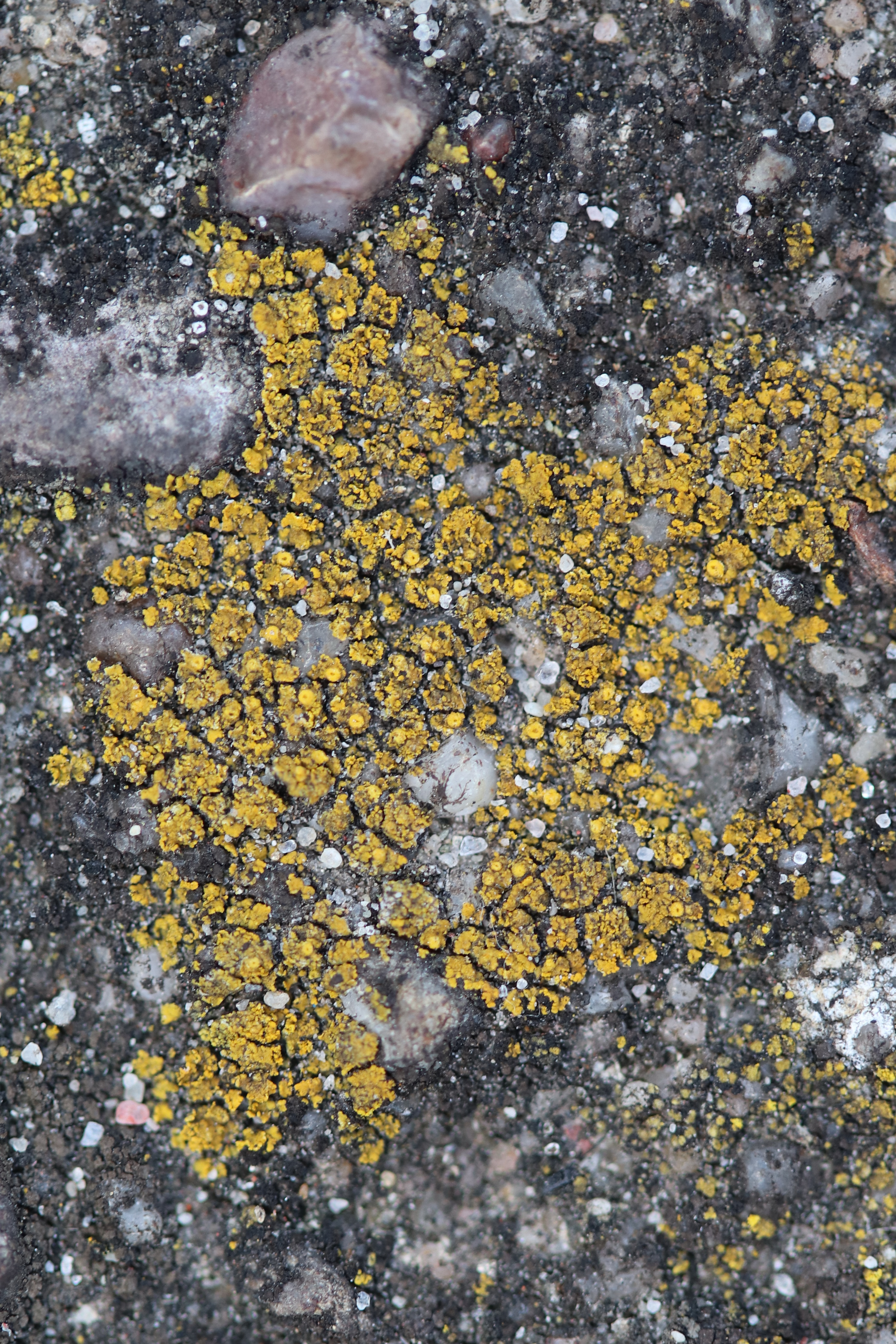

Scientific classification
- Domain: Eukaryota
- Kingdom: Fungi
- Division: Ascomycota
- Class: Lecanoromycetes
- Order: Teloschistales
- Family: Teloschistaceae
- Genus: Flavoplaca
- Species: F. arcis

Binomial name
- Flavoplaca arcis (Poelt & Vězda) Arup, Frödén & Søchting (2013)

Synonyms
- Caloplaca arcis (Poelt & Vězda) Arup (2006); Caloplaca chlorina var. arcis Poelt & Vězda (1990); Caloplaca citrina var. arcis Poelt & Vězda (1990)

= Flavoplaca arcis =

Species of lichen

Flavoplaca arcis is a species of saxicolous (rock-dwelling), crustose to squamulose (scaley) lichen in the family Teloschistaceae. Although widely distributed in Northern, Central, and Western Europe, it is not commonly encountered.

== Taxonomy ==
The species was first scientifically described by lichenologists Josef Poelt and Antonín Vězda in 2006, as a member of genus Caloplaca. Ulf Arup and colleagues transferred the taxon to the genus Flavoplaca in 2013, following a molecular phylogenetics-based restructuring of the family Teloschistaceae.

== Description ==
Flavoplaca arcis features a crustose to slightly squamulose (scale-like) thallus with a bright yellow colour. The thallus is made up of wavy areoles (small, discrete areas), sometimes arranged in a rosette-shaped, that can be wavy with minute lobes around their periphery. These areoles are rather thick, ranging in diameter from 0.4 to 2 mm, and some are adorned with coarse, spherical reproductive structures known as blastidia, which match the colour of the thallus. These blastidia are distributed across the surface and edges of the areoles, with a particularly heavy concentration at the centres of the thalli.

Reproductive structures known as apothecia are zeorine in form (with a disc that is surrounded by a pale thalline margin, which has both algal and fungal cells), adnate (attached flatly) to sessile, yellow, and between 0.3 and 1.5 mm in width. When tested with a solution of potassium hydroxide (the K spot test), the thallus shows a purple reaction, which is a diagnostic feature for identification.

== Habitat and distribution ==
Flavoplaca arcis is found across a wide range of localities in Europe, although it is not commonly reported. Its distribution spans Western and Central Europe, Scandinavia, the Mediterranean region, the Balkan Peninsula, and the Canary Islands. This species has an affinity for both silicate and calcareous rocks and stones. Beyond natural habitats, Flavoplaca arcis is also known to colonise man-made structures. It is typically found in locations that are relatively exposed to the elements and can be found on both vertical and horizontal surfaces.
