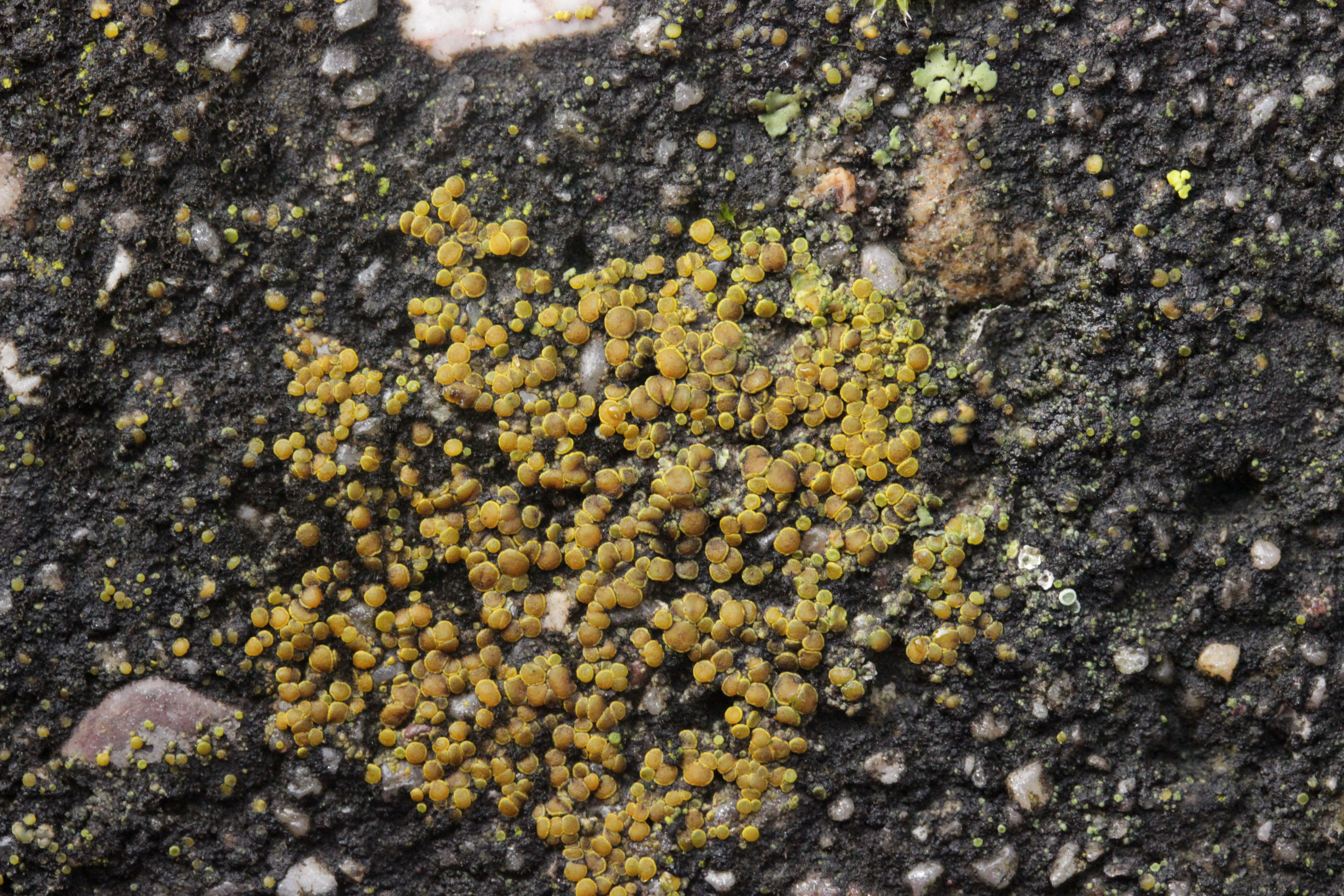

Scientific classification
- Domain: Eukaryota
- Kingdom: Fungi
- Division: Ascomycota
- Class: Lecanoromycetes
- Order: Teloschistales
- Family: Teloschistaceae
- Genus: Flavoplaca
- Species: F. oasis

Binomial name
- Flavoplaca oasis (A.Massal.) Arup, Frödén & Søchting (2013)

Synonyms
- List: Callopisma aurantiacum var. oasis A.Massal. (1856); Callopisma aurantiacum * oasis (A.Massal.) Körb. (1859); Caloplaca aurantiaca f. oasis (A.Massal.) Th.Fr. (1871); Callopisma aurantiacum f. oasis (A.Massal.) Arnold (1881); Lecanora aurantiaca var. oasis (A.Massal.) Stizenb. (1882); Caloplaca erythrella var. oasis (A.Massal.) H.Olivier (1909); Caloplaca pyracea var. rohlenae Servít (1931); Caloplaca velana var. oasis (A.Massal.) Zahlbr. (1931); Caloplaca oasis (A.Massal.) Szatala (1932); Placodium placidium var. oasis (A.Massal.) Szatala (1959); Placodium oasis (A.Massal.) Szatala (1960); Caloplaca oasis f. rohlenae (Servít) Clauzade & Cl.Roux (1976); Caloplaca aurantiaca var. oasis (A.Massal.) Mayrhofer, Denchev, Stoykov & Nikolova (2005); Caloplaca oasis subsp. rohlenae (Servít) Cl.Roux (2008)

= Flavoplaca oasis =

Species of lichen

Flavoplaca oasis is a species of saxicolous (rock-dwelling), crustose lichen in the family Teloschistaceae. It is widely distributed across Europe, and has been reported in Western Asia, China, and North Africa.

== Taxonomy ==
It was first formally described in 1856 by the Italian lichenologist Abramo Bartolommeo Massalongo, as a variety of Callopisma aurantiacum. Ödön Szatala promoted it to distinct species status in 1932, classifying it in the genus Caloplaca. Ulf Arup and colleagues transferred the taxon to the genus Flavoplaca in 2013, following a molecular phylogenetics-based restructuring of the family Teloschistaceae.

== Description ==
The lichen Flavoplaca oasis has a typically visible yet thin thallus, characterised by small granules or areoles, particularly noticeable at the thallus margin. The thallus presents a pale yellow hue. It features an alveolate (honeycomb-like) cortex, and its algal layer is distinctly separated by fungal hyphae. This species lacks a prothallus and does not produce vegetative propagules such as isidia, soredia, and blastidia. The medulla of the thallus is white.

Apothecia (fruiting bodies) in Flavoplaca oasis are abundant and are either pseudolecanorine or zeorine in form. They are sessile with a round or elliptical shape, measuring 0.1–0.5 mm in diameter. The apothecial discs are slightly convex, ranging in colour from orange to dark orange, and are not pruinose (dusty or frosted in appearance). The proper margin of the apothecia is very thin and slightly raised, appearing paler than the disc. The amphithecium (outer layer of the apothecia) is somewhat reduced and contains numerous algae, with a poorly developed cortex. The epihymenium (outermost hymenium layer) is granular and yellow, while the hymenium (tissue layer containing the asci) itself is hyaline (translucent) and measures 75–85 μm in height. Paraphyses (filamentous structures in the hymenium) are simple or slightly branched above, with 1–2 apical cells thickened, extending up to 7 μm wide. The hypothecium (the tissue layer below the hymenium) is either hyaline or inspersed, consisting of thin-walled roundish cells measuring 53–125 μm. This layer lacks crystals or oil droplets and features irregular, prosoplectenchymatous hyphae that are 40–50 μm high. The exciple (outer rim of the apothecia) consists of thin-walled oval to polygonal cells, with the upper side measuring 38–50 μm. Paraphyses are mostly simple, occasionally forked, with swollen tip cells measuring 4.5–5.3 μm in width. Asci (spore-bearing cells) are of the Teloschistes-type, measuring 43–52 by 11–21 μm, and typically contain eight spores. The ascospores are polarilocular and thin-walled, measuring 8.5–13.5 by 4.0–7.6 μm. The spore septum is wide, more than a quarter of the spore length, measuring 2.9–4.6 μm. Pycnidia (asexual reproductive structures) have not been observed in this species.

Chemically, the thallus reacts K+ (purple), while the medulla is K−. The epihymenium also reacts K+ (purple).

=== Similar species ===
Flavoplaca oasis shares similarities with several species. One such species is Athallia holocarpa. The key distinguishing feature of Athallia holocarpa is its apothecia, which have a more yellow tinge compared to the orange hue of Flavoplaca oasis. Additionally, Athallia holocarpa has thicker and more prominent proper margins of the apothecia, and its spores have a broader isthmus, setting it apart from Flavoplaca oasis.

Another species that closely resembles Flavoplaca oasis is Flavoplaca polycarpa. This species can be differentiated by its larger apothecia, which are accompanied by thicker margins. Moreover, Flavoplaca polycarpa is characterised by a more distinct and thicker orange thallus, contrasting with the paler yellow thallus of Flavoplaca oasis. These morphological differences are used in distinguishing Flavoplaca oasis from its look-alikes in the field.

== Habitat and distribution ==
Flavoplaca oasis has established a widespread presence across Europe, and has been reported in Western Asia and North Africa.

The typical habitats for Flavoplaca oasis are substrates such as pure limestone, concrete, and mortar, indicating the species' preference for alkaline environments often found in man-made structures. Additionally, Flavoplaca oasis has a versatile ecological role, as it can grow both as a free-living lichen and as a parasitic lichen. In its parasitic form, it grows on endolithic species (i.e., crustose lichens that grow in the interior of rocks) of the genus Verrucaria. The known distribution of the lichen was expanded in 2018 to include China.
