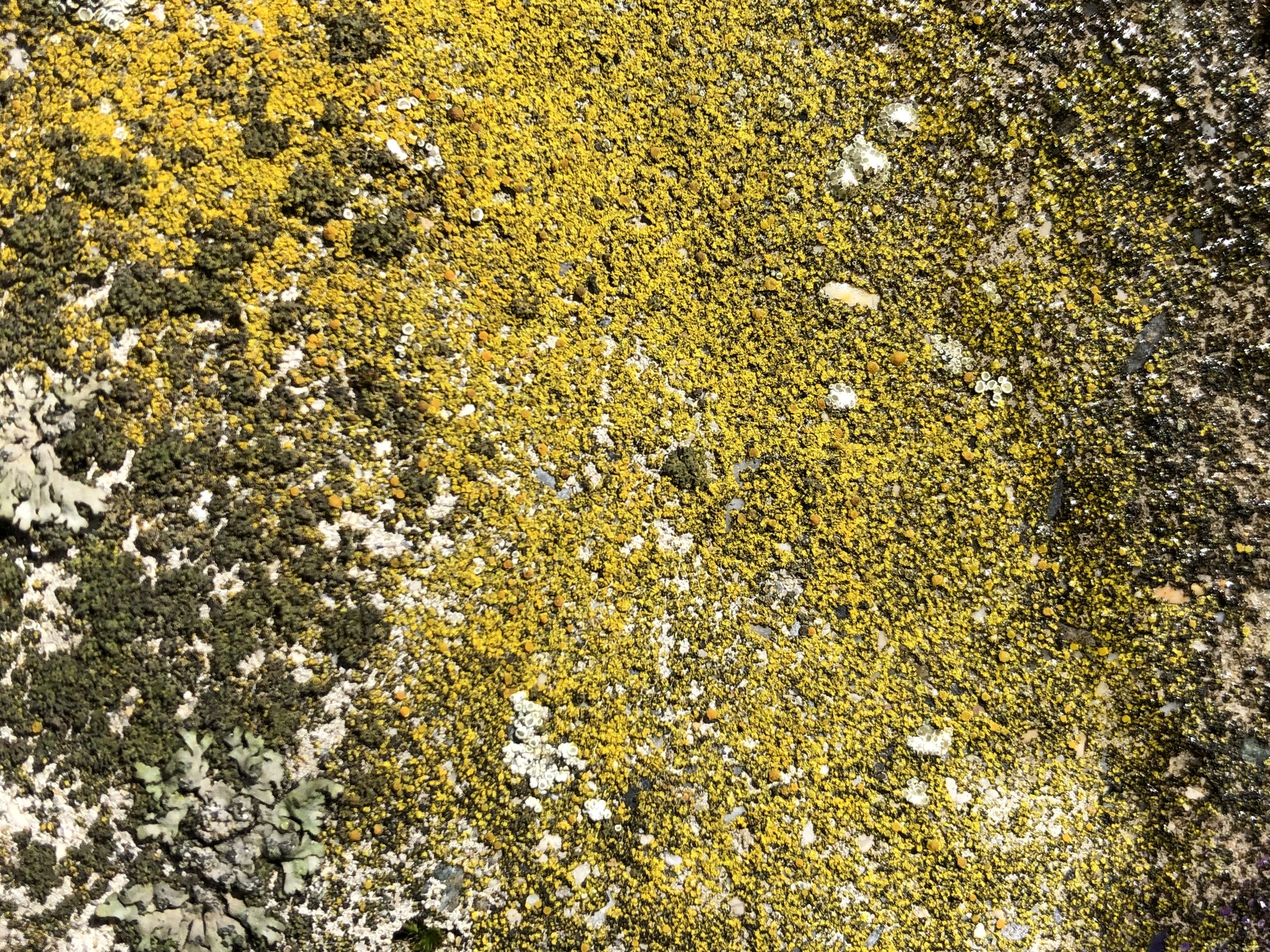

Conservation status
- Apparently Secure (NatureServe)

Scientific classification
- Kingdom: Fungi
- Division: Ascomycota
- Class: Lecanoromycetes
- Order: Teloschistales
- Family: Teloschistaceae
- Genus: Flavoplaca
- Species: F. citrina

Binomial name
- Flavoplaca citrina (Hoffm.) Arup, Frödén & Søchting (2013)

Synonyms
- List: Verrucaria citrina Hoffm. (1796); Patellaria citrina (Hoffm.) Wibel (1799); Lichen citrinus (Hoffm.) Ach. (1799); Parmelia citrina (Hoffm.) Ach. (1803); Lecanora citrina (Hoffm.) Ach. (1810); Lichen peltatus * citrina (Hoffm.) Lam. (1813); Parmelia aurella var. citrina (Hoffm.) Wallr. (1831); Parmelia murorum f. citrina (Hoffm.) Fr. (1831); Lecidea citrina (Hoffm.) D.Dietr. (1837); Parmelia parietina var. citrina (Hoffm.) Schaer. (1840); Parmelia murorum var. citrina (Hoffm.) Schaer. (1840); Lecanora murorum var. citrina (Hoffm.) Rabenh. (1845); Parmelia aurantiaca var. citrina (Hoffm.) D.Dietr. (1846); Parmelia parietina f. citrina (Hoffm.) Körb. (1846); Placodium murorum var. citrinum (Hoffm.) Flot. (1850); Lecanora vitellina var. citrina (Hoffm.) Schaer. (1850); Callopisma citrinum (Hoffm.) A.Massal. (1852); Placodium citrinum (Hoffm.) Hepp (1857); Physcia murorum var. citrina (Hoffm.) Arnold (1860); Candelaria vulgaris var. citrina (Hoffm.) Kremp. (1861); Caloplaca citrina (Hoffm.) Th.Fr. (1861); Amphiloma citrinum (Hoffm.) Müll.Arg. (1862); Xanthoria murorum var. citrina (Hoffm.) Zwackh (1862); Pyrenodesmia citrina (Hoffm.) Trevis. (1869); Caloplaca citrinella (Hoffm.) Jatta (1908); Blastenia citrina (Hoffm.) B.de Lesd. (1914); Caloplaca incrustans var. citrina (Hoffm.) B.de Lesd. (1949); Lichen flavescens Link (1791)

= Flavoplaca citrina =

Species of lichen-forming fungus

Flavoplaca citrina, the mealy firedot lichen, is a species of saxicolous (rock-dwelling), crustose lichen in the family Teloschistaceae. It is a common species with a cosmopolitan distribution.

== Taxonomy ==
Flavoplaca citrina first scientifically described and named in 1796 by the German lichenologist Georg Franz Hoffmann, who initially placed it in the genus Verrucaria. Ulf Arup and colleagues transferred the taxon to the genus Flavoplaca in 2013, following a molecular phylogenetics-based restructuring of the family Teloschistaceae. Throughout its taxonomic history, the species has accumulated numerous synonyms due to multiple redescriptions and reclassifications, including various designations as varieties or forms of other species.

== Description ==
Flavoplaca citrina is a crustose (crust-like) lichen with a yellow-green thallus (the main body of the lichen). The thallus is pulverulent (powdery) and entirely covered with granular soredia (tiny, powdery reproductive propagules). It can vary from thin to moderately thick and is usually soft. Thicker thalli often break into irregular, coarse areoles (small, discrete areas), typically appearing green-yellow or green in shaded conditions. Very thick thalli, which lack soredia, have convex (rounded) areoles.

The soredia, measuring between 0.02 and 0.07 mm in diameter, form at the margins of these areoles and are the same colour as the thallus. There is no prothallus (the initial growth stage of the lichen) or, if present, it is white.

Apothecia (the fruiting bodies) are frequent, ranging from 0.3 to 1.5 mm in diameter. They start immersed in the thallus but become sessile (sitting on the surface) as they mature. These apothecia are flat and can swell slightly. The edges of the apothecia (thalline margins) are persistent, granular, and sorediate, sometimes appearing frosty (pruinose). The disc is yellow-orange with a green-yellow margin.

Paraphyses (sterile filamentous structures in the apothecia) often have narrow tips or are club-shaped (clavate) up to 3 μm wide. The asci (spore-producing cells) are typically long and narrow, containing broadly ellipsoid ascospores that measure 10.5–14.8 μm in length and 5–7.5 μm in width, with a central septum (dividing partition) 3–5 μm wide, making up about one-third of the spore's length. Conidia (asexual spores) are mostly bacilliform (rod-shaped).

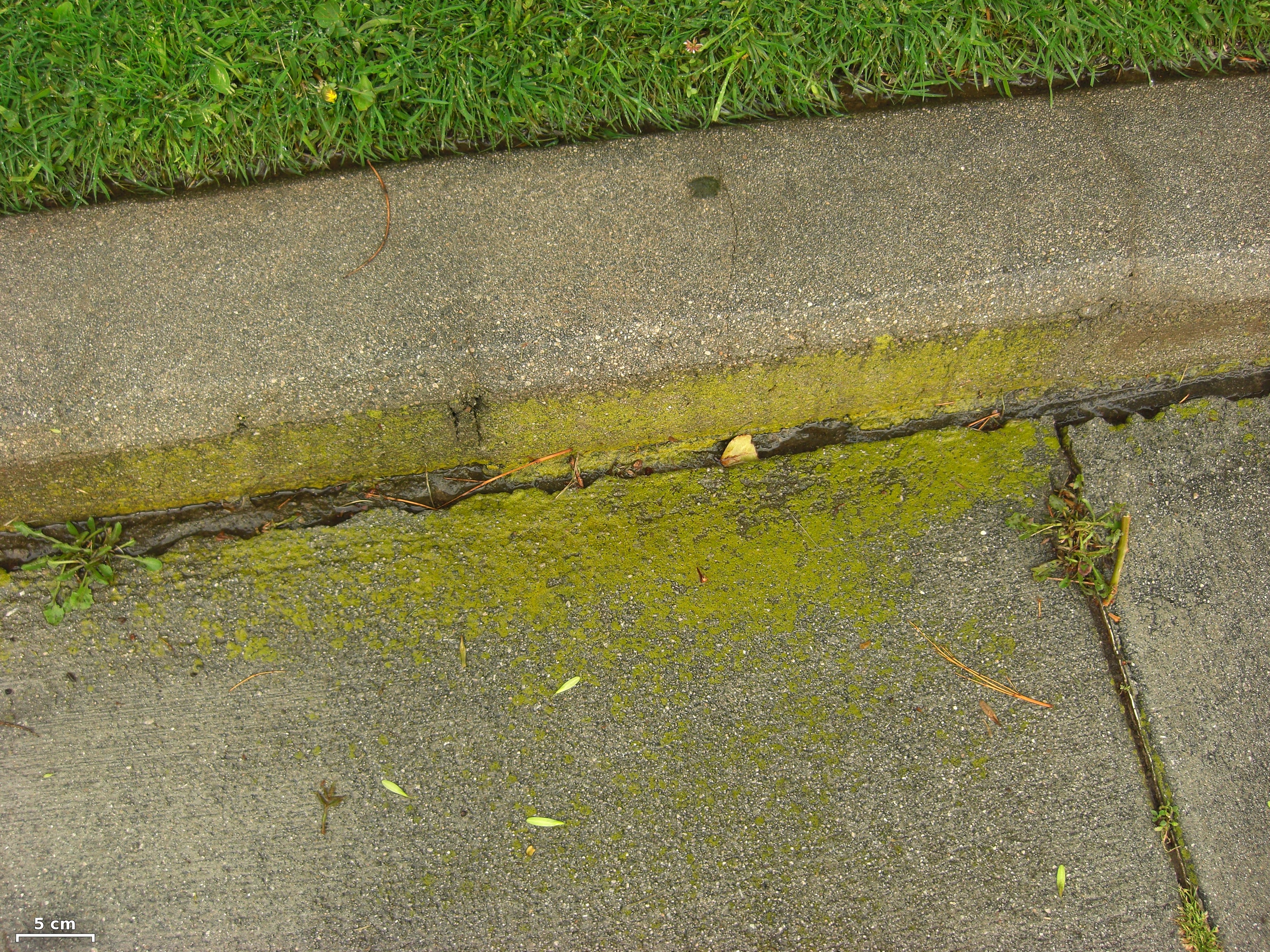
On concrete curb, showing typical yellow-orange colouration. Scale bar: 5 cm

All parts of the lichen react with potassium hydroxide solution (K) solution to turn purple.

Flavoplaca citrina is often confused with Leproplaca chrysodeta, but that species tends to occur in moist, shaded places on calcareous rock and usually has a darker, browner thallus, often with a white cottony medulla.

== Habitat and distribution ==
Flavoplaca citrina is commonly found on calcareous (chalky) or nutrient-rich substrates, including limestone, concrete, mortar, bone, and asbestos cement, especially on walls in sunny locations. It is less common on naturally calcareous or nutrient-enriched siliceous rocks and metalwork, and rarely occurs on wood or bark (corticolous). The species is cosmopolitan in distribution.

Flavoplaca citrina is nitrophilic (adapted to nitrogen-rich environments) and is frequently found on cliffs below birds' nests, where it benefits from nitrogen enrichment by bird excrement. Research has identified F. citrina as an indicator species for bird-influenced habitats, particularly on cliff faces where peregrine falcons and ravens nest, where it thrives in localised nutrient-rich zones within otherwise nutrient-poor ecosystems.

In North and Central America, Flavoplaca citrina is common in temperate regions and more occasional in the Arctic and at higher elevations in Mexico and the Caribbean. Clifford Wetmore described it as growing in exposed situations on both calcareous and non-calcareous rock, though it has also been recorded from bark, wood, and sometimes bryophytes.
