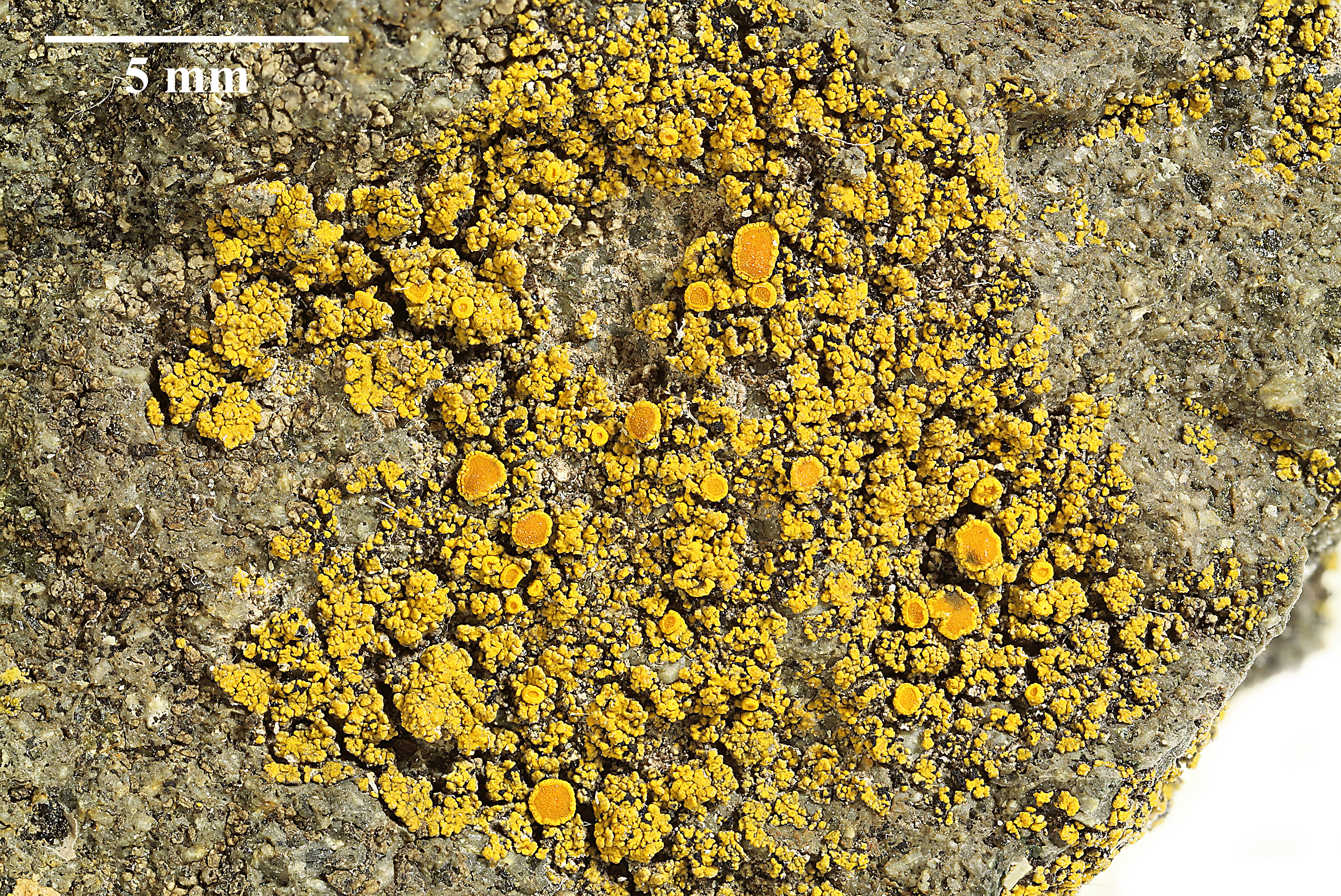

Scientific classification
- Domain: Eukaryota
- Kingdom: Fungi
- Division: Ascomycota
- Class: Lecanoromycetes
- Order: Teloschistales
- Family: Teloschistaceae
- Genus: Flavoplaca
- Species: F. microthallina

Binomial name
- Flavoplaca microthallina (Wedd.) Arup, Frödén & Søchting 2013

Synonyms
- List: Lecanora microthallina Wedd. (1875); Physcia microthallina (Wedd.) Arnold (1881); Placodium microthallinum (Wedd.) H.Olivier (1897); Placodium murorum var. microthallinum (Wedd.) Boistel (1903); Placodium thallincolum var. microthallinum (Wedd.) H.Olivier (1909); Caloplaca microthallina (Wedd.) Zahlbr. (1931); Lecanora obliterascens Nyl. (1883); Lecanora tegularis var. obliterascens (Nyl.) Cromb. (1894); Lecanora murorum var. obliterascens (Nyl.) Cromb. (1894); Caloplaca lobulata var. obliterascens (Nyl.) Boistel (1903); Placodium obliterascens (Nyl.) H.Olivier (1909); Caloplaca pusilla var. obliterascens (Nyl.) Lettau (1912); Caloplaca tegularis var. obliterascens (Nyl.) Mig. (1925); Caloplaca obliterascens (Nyl.) Zahlbr. (1931)

= Flavoplaca microthallina =

Species of lichen

Flavoplaca microthallina is a species of crustose lichen in the family Teloschistaceae. It was described as a new species in 1875 by Hugh Algernon Weddell, as a member of the genus Lecanora. After acquiring many synonyms in its taxonomic history through being shuffled to various genera, it was reclassified in Flavoplaca in 2013.
