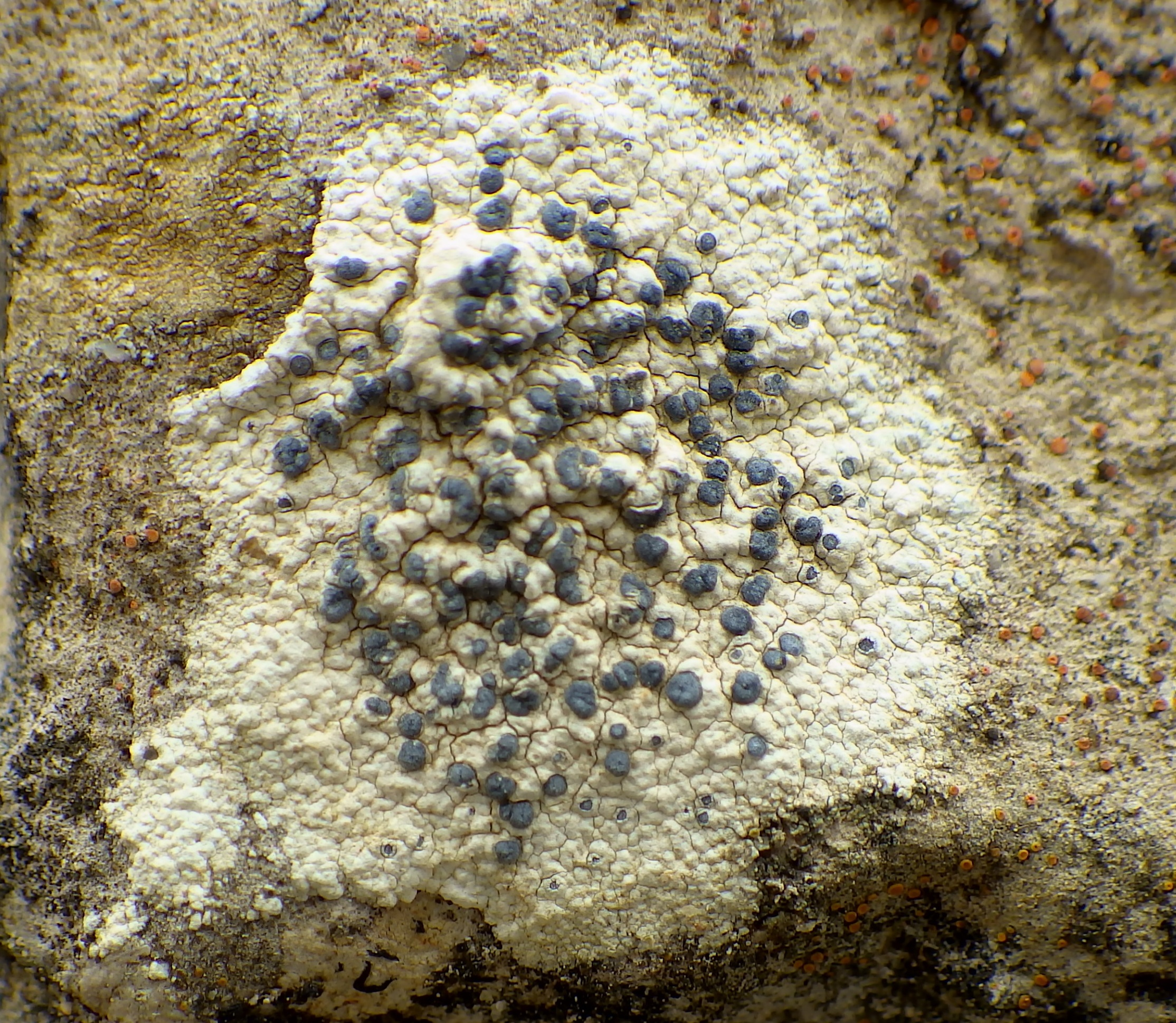

Scientific classification
- Domain: Eukaryota
- Kingdom: Fungi
- Division: Ascomycota
- Class: Lecanoromycetes
- Order: Caliciales
- Family: Caliciaceae
- Genus: Diplotomma
- Species: D. alboatrum

Binomial name
- Diplotomma alboatrum (Hoffm.) Flot. (1849)

Synonyms
- Lichen alboater Hoffm. (1784); Verrucaria alboatra (Hoffm.) Hoffm. (1790); Lecidea alboatra (Hoffm.) Chevall. (1826); Abacina alboatra (Hoffm.) Norman (1852); Rhizocarpon alboatrum (Hoffm.) Anzi (1860); Buellia alboatra (Hoffm.) Th.Fr. (1861); Lecanora alboatra (Hoffm.) Nyl. (1873); Lecidea soreumidia Stirt. (1878); Rhizocarpon soreumidium (Stirt.) A.L.Sm. (1911)

= Diplotomma alboatrum =

Species of lichen

Diplotomma alboatrum is a species of lichen in the family Caliciaceae. It was first described as Lichen alboater by German lichenologist Georg Franz Hoffmann in 1784. Julius von Flotow transferred it to the genus Diplotomma in 1849. The lichen is widely distributed, and has been recorded in Europe, North America, and Australasia.
