= Alexandre François Malbranche =

French lichenologist (1818–1888)

Alexandre François Malbranche (6 April 1818, Bernay, Eure – 16 May 1888, Rouen) was a French pharmacist, botanist and mycologist. He is known for his botanical and mycological studies associated with Normandy,

He received his education in Rouen, where he subsequently spent his career as a pharmacist. He served as president of the Société des amis des sciences de Rouen, and for several years was a member of the Société botanique de France (1879–1888).

He was the author of treatises on lichens, fungi, teratology in plants, Darwinism and on the botanical genus Rubus. Between 1863 and 1869, he edited and distributed the exsiccata Lichens de la Normandie, préparés et classés d'après la méthode du Dr. Nylander. As a taxonomist, he co-circumscribed a number of Rubus species. The mycological genus Malbranchea was named in his honor by Pier Andrea Saccardo (1882).

== Selected works ==
- Catalogue des plantes cellulaires et vasculaires de la Seine-inférieure, 1864 – Catalog of cellular and vascular plants of Seine-Inférieure.
- Catalogue descriptif des lichens de la Normandie : classés d'après la méthode du Dr. Nylander, 1870 – Descriptive catalog on lichens of Normandy.
- Le transformisme, ses origines, ses principes, ses impossibilités, 1874 – Transformism, origins, principles, impossibilities.
- Essai sur les Rubus normands, 1875 – Essay on Rubus found in Normandy.
- Contributions à l'étude monographique du genre Graphis, 1884 – Contributions to the study of the lichen genus Graphis.
