= August Wilhelm Eberhard Christoph Wibel =

August Wilhelm Eberhard Christoph Wibel (1775, Ernsbach near Öhringen – 1814, Wertheim am Main) was a German physician and botanist.

He was a student at the University of Jena, earning his medical doctorate in 1797. Later, he worked as a physician in the city of Wertheim am Main.

He described a number of plant species, and is the taxonomic authority of the genus Sciophila (family Liliaceae). The fern genus Wibelia (family Davalliaceae) was named in his honor by Johann Jakob Bernhardi.

== Principal works ==
- Primitiae florae Werthemensis, 1799.
- Beyträge zur Beförderung der Pflanzenkunde: Ersten Bandes erste Abtheilung, 1800 - Contributions to the advancement of botany.
