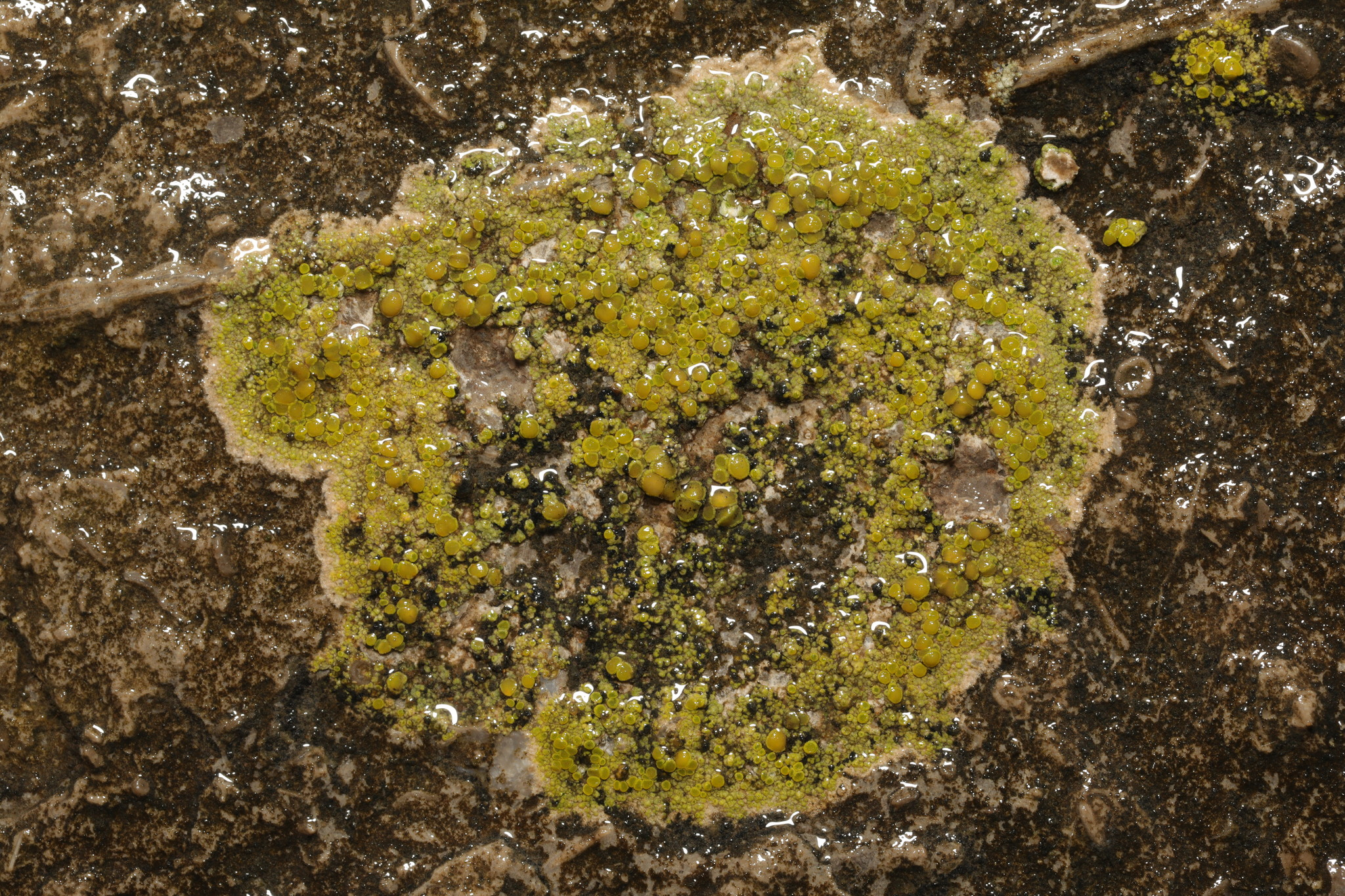

Scientific classification
- Domain: Eukaryota
- Kingdom: Fungi
- Division: Ascomycota
- Class: Lecanoromycetes
- Order: Teloschistales
- Family: Teloschistaceae
- Genus: Flavoplaca
- Species: F. maritima

Binomial name
- Flavoplaca maritima (B.de Lesd.) Arup, Frödén & Søchting (2013)

Synonyms
- Caloplaca citrina var. maritima B.de Lesd. (1909); Caloplaca maritima (B.de Lesd.) B.de Lesd. (1953)

= Flavoplaca maritima =

Species of lichen

Flavoplaca maritima is a species of crustose lichen in the family Teloschistaceae. It is found in costal areas of Northern, Western, and Southern Europe. It mostly occurs on rocks, but has also been recorded growing on wood.

== Taxonomy ==
It was first formally described in 1909 by the French lichenologist Maurice Bouly de Lesdain (in a publication of Alexander Zahlbruckner), who described it as a variety of Caloplaca citrina. Later, he considered the taxon worthy of more distinct status and published it as the species Caloplaca maritima.

Ulf Arup and colleagues transferred the taxon to the genus Flavoplaca in 2013, following a molecular phylogenetics-based restructuring of the family Teloschistaceae.

== Description ==
Flavoplaca maritima is distinguished by its golden-yellow to pale orange, crustose thallus. It often forms extensive patches, characterised by a cracked-areolate surface, which means the thallus is broken into flat, uneven, knobbly sections called areoles. These areoles are bordered by an orange prothallus, giving the lichen a distinctly fragmented appearance.

This species typically features numerous apothecia, which are the fruiting bodies of the lichen. These apothecia are sessile, meaning they sit directly on the thallus without a stalk, and are flat in shape. Their colour ranges from yellow to yellow-orange and they are edged with a thin thalline margin that matches the thallus in colour.

The ascospores of Flavoplaca maritima measure 11–15 μm in length and 5–8 μm in width, with a septum (a partition in the spore) measuring between 3.5 and 5.5 μm. In terms of chemical spot test reactions, all parts of this lichen are K+ (purple).

== Habitat and distribution, and ecology ==
Flavoplaca maritima grows on sun-exposed siliceous rocks, sometimes on calcareous walls, and rarely on wood. It occurs in the western British Isles, Western Europe, Mediterranean France, and the Channel Islands, usually in coastal areas.

Verrucula maritimaria is a lichenicolous (lichen-dwelling) fungus that is known to parasitise Flavoplaca maritima. In the Netherlands, the moss Hydropunctarietea maurae is a common associate with Flavoplaca maritima.
