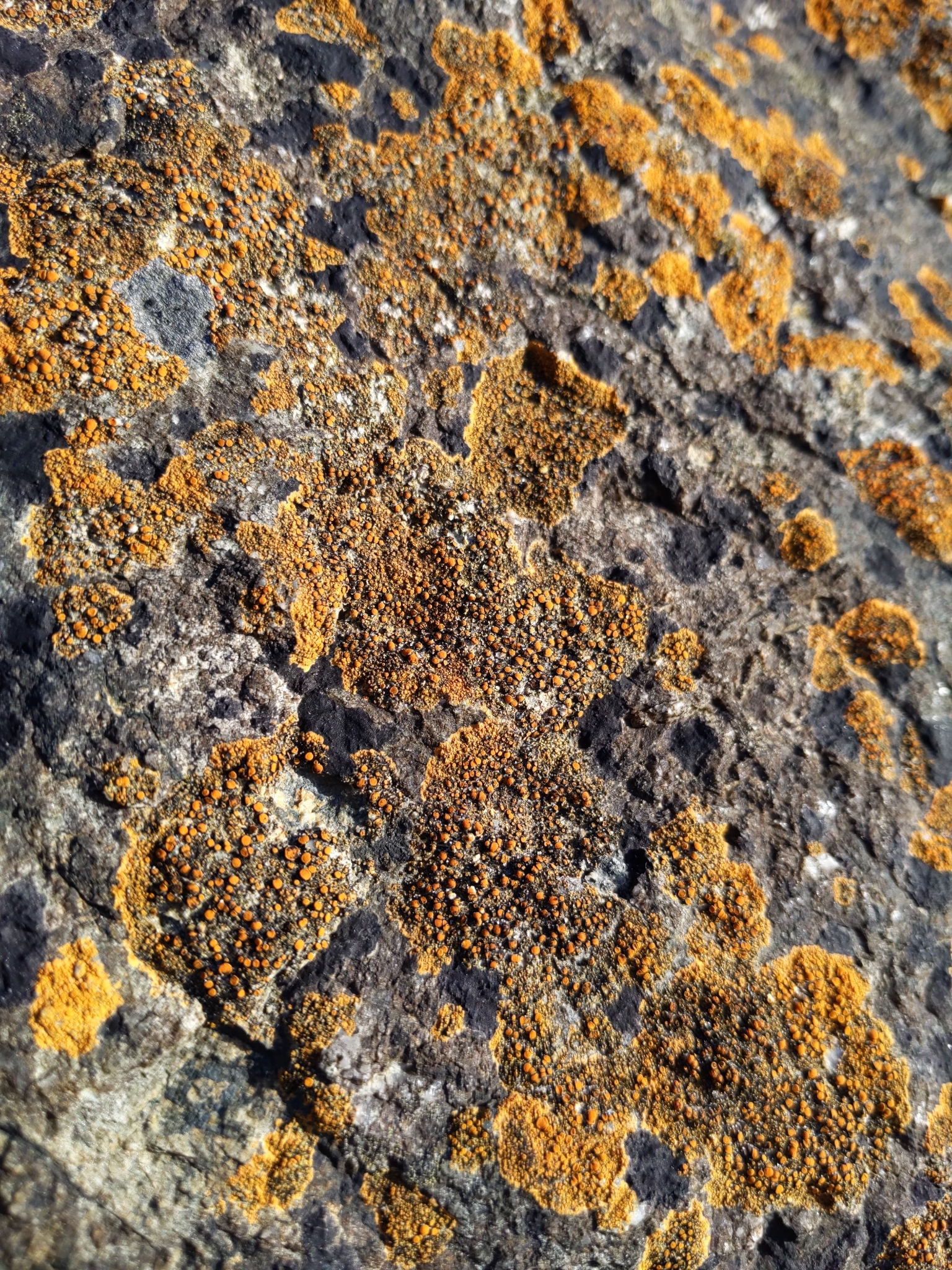

Conservation status
- Apparently Secure (NatureServe)

Scientific classification
- Domain: Eukaryota
- Kingdom: Fungi
- Division: Ascomycota
- Class: Lecanoromycetes
- Order: Teloschistales
- Family: Teloschistaceae
- Genus: Flavoplaca
- Species: F. marina

Binomial name
- Flavoplaca marina (Wedd.) Arup, Frödén & Søchting (2013)

Synonyms
- List: Lecanora marina Wedd. (1875); Caloplaca marina var. flavogranulata Wedd. (1875); Lecanora murorum var. flavogranulata (Wedd.) Wedd. (1876); Physcia marina (Wedd.) Arnold (1881); Placodium marinum (Wedd.) H.Olivier (1884); Caloplaca lobulata var. flavogranulata (Wedd.) H.Olivier (1897); Caloplaca lobulata f. flavogranulata (Wedd.) Boistel (1903); Caloplaca lobulata var. marina (Wedd.) Boistel (1903); Placodium murorum var. marinum (Wedd.) Vain. (1909); Lecanora lobulata f. flavogranulata (Wedd.) Harm. (1913); Caloplaca marina (Wedd.) Zahlbr. (1921); Caloplaca marina f. flavogranulata (Wedd.) Zahlbr. (1921); Placodium lobulatum f. flavogranulatum (Wedd.) Walt.Watson (1930); Gasparrinia marina (Wedd.) Hav. (1936)

= Flavoplaca marina =

Species of lichen

Flavoplaca marina is a species of saxicolous (rock-dwelling), crustose lichen in the family Teloschistaceae. It was first formally described as a new species in 1875 by Hugh Algernon Weddell, as Lecanora marina. Ulf Arup and colleagues transferred the taxon to the genus Flavoplaca in 2013, following a molecular phylogenetics-based restructuring of the family Teloschistaceae.
