= Supralittoral zone =

Area type in coastal geography

The supralittoral zone, also known as the splash zone, spray zone or the supratidal zone, sometimes also referred to as the white zone, is the area above the spring high tide line, on coastlines and estuaries, that is regularly splashed, but not submerged by ocean water. Seawater penetrates these elevated areas only during storms with high tides.

Organisms here must cope also with exposure to air, fresh water from rain, cold, heat and predation by land animals and seabirds. At the top of this area, patches of dark lichens can appear as crusts on rocks. Some types of periwinkles, Neritidae and detritus feeding Isopoda commonly inhabit the lower supralittoral.

== See also ==
- Littoral zone
- Sublittoral zone
