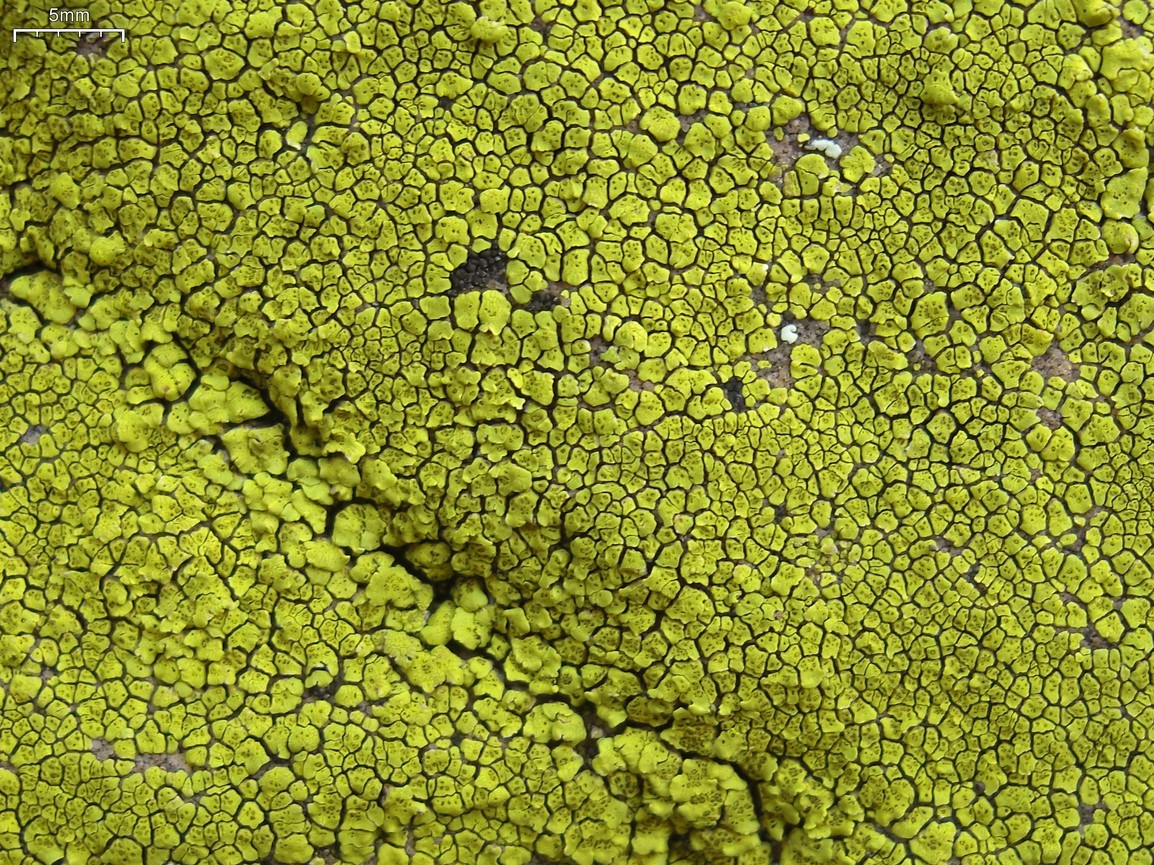

Scientific classification
- Kingdom: Fungi
- Division: Ascomycota
- Class: Lecanoromycetes
- Order: Acarosporales
- Family: Acarosporaceae
- Genus: Acarospora
- Species: A. socialis

Binomial name
- Acarospora socialis H.Magn. (1929)

= Acarospora socialis =

Species of lichen

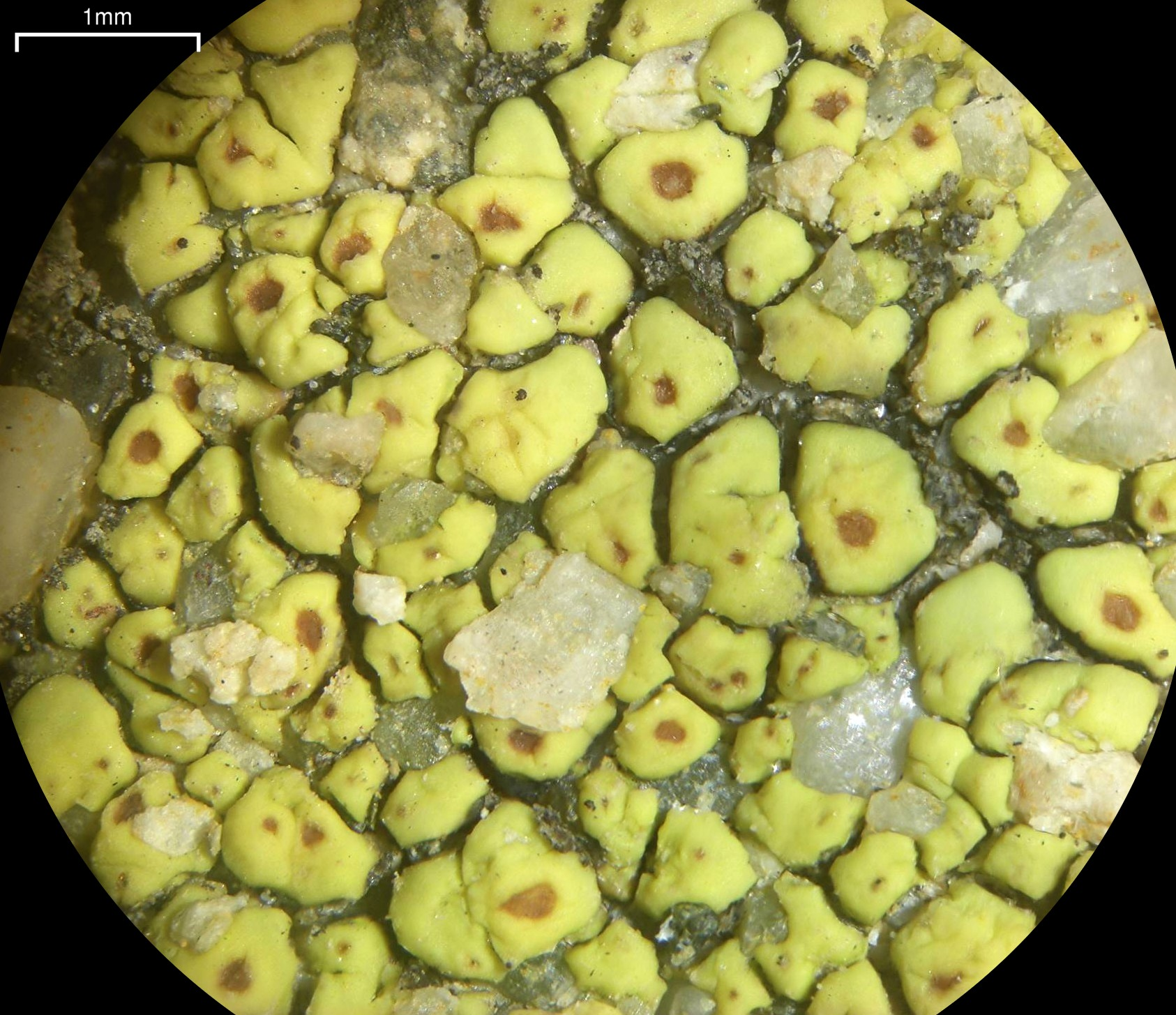
Close-up view

Acarospora socialis (bright cobblestone lichen) is a usually bright yellow areolate to squamulose crustose lichen in the family Acarosporaceae that grows up to 10 cm wide, mostly on rock in western North America. It is among the most common lichens in the deserts of Arizona and southern California. It grows on sandstone, intrusive and extrusive igneous rock such as granitics, in all kinds of exposures to sunlight, including vertical rock walls. It is found in North America, including areas of the Mojave Desert and Sonoran Desert region, to Baja California Sur. It is the most common yellow member of its genus in southwestern North America. It sometimes, but rarely, grows on other soil crusts. It is a pioneer species.

It is variable in its growth pattern. Areoles can be angular to round, sometimes forming lobes. They can be contiguous or scattered. Color is variable - bleached white, green-yellow, and other shades of yellow. It has a lower surface when squamulose, but without a lower cortex. With age, it forms stipes. Each squamule has ( usually one ) angular apothecia which may be up to 1.5 mm in diameter and 0.8 mm in thickness. Two apothecia may merge, leaving a peninsula (umbo) of thalline tissue through the disc. Apothecia may have lecanorine margins. Apothecia have a flat to concave mostly brown or reddish brown, concave disc.

Lichen spot tests are all negative. It is UV+ orange. Secondary metabolites include rhizocarpic acid, and sometimes trace amounts of epanorin.

When young, it is very similar to Acarospora contigua. But A. socialis has areolas that become lobed and squamulose. When appearing on soil, it may be mistaken for Acarospora schleicheri. But A. socialis has contiguous areoles while those of A. schlecheri can be imbricate. It is also similar to Acarospora chrysops, which grows from South America to central Mexico, through Texas and into the Rocky Mountains. It is very similar to Pleopsidium flavum at mid-level mountains, with the latter favoring higher elevations, above 900 metres (3,000 ft), and being somewhat effigurate with smaller (less than 1 mm) yellow apothecia.
