= Acarospora piedmontensis =

Scientific classification
- Kingdom: Fungi
- Division: Ascomycota
- Class: Lecanoromycetes
- Order: Acarosporales
- Family: Acarosporaceae
- Genus: Acarospora
- Species: A. piedmontensis

Binomial name
- Acarospora piedmontensis K.Knudsen (2011)
- Type locality: Forty Acre Rock, South Carolina, US

Species of lichen-forming fungus

Acarospora piedmontensis is a species of saxicolous (rock-dwelling) crustose lichen in the family Acarosporaceae. Described in 2011 from a granite flatrock outcrop at Forty Acre Rock in Lancaster County, South Carolina, this lichen is characterized by small, brown, scale-like squamules that develop on distinct stalks and typically bear a single large, immersed apothecium (fruiting body) with a disc (the exposed spore-bearing surface) that turns reddish-brown when wet. The species appears to be restricted to the Piedmont region of eastern North America, where it grows on granitic outcrops in open, sunny settings and can form large patches, sometimes becoming the most abundant crustose lichen on granite outcrops.

== Taxonomy ==
Acarospora piedmontensis was described as a new species in 2011 by Kerry Knudsen, based on material collected from granite flatrock at Forty Acre Rock in Lancaster County, South Carolina. The original diagnosis (short formal description) notes that it resembles A. badiofusca but differs in having areoles that develop a distinct stalk (stipe). The epithet piedmontensis refers to the Piedmont region of eastern North America, between the Appalachian Mountains and the Atlantic coastal plain, where the species was discovered and is reported to be common.

== Description ==
The thallus (lichen body) begins as scattered areoles (small surface units) that develop into small squamules (scale-like lobes), sometimes merging into a more continuous patch as the thallus expands. Squamules are typically about 0.5–1 mm across and less than 1 mm tall, and each develops a stalk (stipe) that is narrower than the squamule itself. The upper surface is brown and matte, and lacks pruina (a powdery coating), with the edges turned downward, often with a black rim. The lower surface is brown but commonly becomes blackened (melanized, darkened by pigment), and it may show deep fissures.

There is usually one apothecium per squamule. The disc is immersed (sunken into the squamule) and dull brown, becoming red-brown when wet, and can reach about 1 mm in diameter. Under the microscope, the cortex is about 20–30 μm (micrometres) thick, with a dark upper layer and a hyaline (colorless) lower portion, and the algal layer can be thin to uneven, with the photobiont (the photosynthetic partner) often arranged in vertical rows. The hymenium (spore-bearing layer) in mature apothecia is reported as (100–)150–170 μm tall, and the ascospores are single-celled (simple), hyaline, broadly ellipsoid, about 4–5 × 2–2.5 μm. Pycnidia were observed (about 80 μm diameter), with conidia about 3 × 1 μm. No secondary metabolites were detected by thin-layer chromatography; standard lichen spot tests were negative (K−, C−, KC−, P−, UV−).

=== Similar species ===
In the field, the mature thalli of Acarospora piedmontensis can be recognized by small squamules on a narrow stipe, a darkened underside, and usually a single large, immersed apothecium whose disc turns red-brown when wet. It may be mistaken for A. badiofusca because both can have large apothecia; however, it differs from A. piedmontensis in having stalked squamules and in microscopic characters, including the algal-layer pattern and a taller hymenium. It has also been compared with the western North American A. obnubila, which (as treated there) has an interrupted algal layer, a pale lower surface, and a much thicker cortex, and does not overlap geographically with A. piedmontensis.

== Habitat and distribution ==
Acarospora piedmontensis occurs in open, sunny settings on granitic outcrops and extensive granitic slabs below about 400 m (about 1,300 ft) elevation. In the type region it occurs with oak (Quercus) species, old-growth junipers, and Pinus taeda.

It appears to be restricted to the eastern North American Piedmont and is currently known from Georgia and South Carolina. It can form solitary patches 10 cm (about 4 in) across or more, and it may be the dominant crustose lichen in some local granite-outcrop communities.
