= Acarospora veronensis =

Conservation status
- Secure (NatureServe)

Scientific classification
- Domain: Eukaryota
- Kingdom: Fungi
- Division: Ascomycota
- Class: Lecanoromycetes
- Order: Acarosporales
- Family: Acarosporaceae
- Genus: Acarospora
- Species: A. veronensis

Binomial name
- Acarospora veronensis A.Massal. (1852)

Synonyms
- Acarospora magnussonii Samp. (1924)

Species of fungus

Acarospora veronensis is a medium brown to dark brown or black crustose lichen that grows up to 4 cm (1.6 in) wide. It is extremely variable in its growth forms, being verruculose, rimose, areolate, or squamulose. It has 0.2–1.5 mm round to angular areoles which may be lobed, and may be contiguous or dispersed. It grows on acidic rocks, basalt, and sometimes on wood. It is one of the most common members of its genus in the Sonoran Desert region, common in Arizona, southern California, Baja California north and south, Sonora, to outside the region in Durango. Each areole bears one to many 0.1–1 mm rounded to angular apothecia that are deeply immersed in the areole, with a dull reddish-brown flat to convex disc. Cylindrical asci have 100 or more ellipsoid ascospores. Lichen spot tests are all negative, and it is UV-. It is an indicator of undisturbed soil habitats. Sometimes specimens may look like Acarospora strigata.
