= Acarospora organensis =

Scientific classification
- Kingdom: Fungi
- Division: Ascomycota
- Class: Lecanoromycetes
- Order: Acarosporales
- Family: Acarosporaceae
- Genus: Acarospora
- Species: A. organensis

Binomial name
- Acarospora organensis Knudsen, et al. (2021)

Species of lichens

Acarospora organensis is a species of saxicolous (rock-dwelling), squamulose lichen. It was originally described in the late 1920s by Swedish naturalist and part-time lichenologist A. H. Magnusson who misidentified it as Acarospora xanthophana, a species endemic to South America. In 2021, botanist and lichenologist Kerry Knudsen corrected the original misidentification and formally described it as Acarospora organensis.

== Description ==
A. organensis has a hypothallus inside its substrate, with no algae observed via IKI staining method.

The thallus (main body) can be rimose or areolate, and dispersed (spread out) or contiguous (grouped together) over several square centimeters. The areoles (individual sections) on the thallus are irregular or angular in shape, measuring 0.5–1.0 × 0.3–0.5 mm and either flat or convex (rounded out), the areoles along the edges of the thalli are the same size and shape as the inner areoles, however can elongate up to 1.0 × 0.5 cm and convex up to 2.0 mm.

The upper surface of the fungi is generally pale-yellow in color, epruinose (no frosted appearance), and can be smooth or rough.

The cortex is 60–70 μm tall, lacking an epicortex (tissue layer above the cortex) with the uppermost layer appearing yellow or dark yellow and 20–30 μm thick which obscures the hyphae, as well as a 30–40 μm thick lower layer which is white in appearance and abundant in crystals which sometimes have a positive (+) reaction with the IKI (IKI+) staining method producing a reddish color, the cortical cells (cells making up the cortex) are mostly globose (spherical) or oval in appearance around 2–5 μm in diameter, algal cells are sometimes observed in the lowest layers of the cortex.

The fungus contains a scattered to dense layer of algae, with even and uneven upper and lower edges which are 30–100 μm thick, with most algal cells measuring 8–12 μm in diameter.

The medulla (layer inside thallus) of the fungus can be either clear or obscured by crystals, 50–100 μm thick and contains variably intricate to vertical hyphae 2.0–4.5 μm thick.

The fungus produces small structures called apothecia which vary in size from 0.1–0.2 mm occasionally as much as 0.5 mm, forming isunken, punctiform (point or dot) discs which are typically black or reddish-brown but sometimes yellow in appearance due to the presence of crystals from rhizocarpic acid and epanorin; there is typically only one apothecium per areole.

Inside the apothecium, the perithecium expands up to 100 μm and sometimes forms a ring around the disk. The hypothecium is approximately 10 μm thick. The hymenium layer is typically 150–170 μm tall, and the epihymenium is variable in thickness, yellow to yellowish-brown, containing crystals. The paraphyses are usually 1.0–1.5 μm in diameter, with some branching at the top. The asci are typically cylindrical and 90 × 10 μm to 110 × 20 μm in size and contain 100–200 ascospores per ascus. The ascospores are variable in shape, but usually ellipsoidal with a size range of (3.0–)4.0–5.0(–7.0) × 1.0–1.5(–2.5) μm (numbers in parentheses denoting infrequent, outlier occurrences).

This species also contains structures called pycnidia which are approximately 100 × 60 μm in size, with no visible ostiole on the upper surface, the conidiogenous cells are mostly 15 × 0.5 μm, with conidia 1.0–2.0 μm in diameter and mostly globose to subglobose in appearance.

== Habitat and distribution ==
A. organensis grows on granite, dried lava, sandstone, and rhyolite in full sun at elevations of 1371–1725 m and is endemic to the Southwestern United States and Mexico in the Chihuahuan and Sonoran deserts, with specimens (including the ones misidentified by Magnusson) collected in northern New Mexico and Peach Springs, Arizona suggesting that there may be a broader distribution across the high elevation desert regions of the United States and Mexico.

== Etymology ==
A. organensis is named for the Organ Mountains in New Mexico.
