= Acarospora pseudofuscata =

Scientific classification
- Domain: Eukaryota
- Kingdom: Fungi
- Division: Ascomycota
- Class: Lecanoromycetes
- Order: Acarosporales
- Family: Acarosporaceae
- Genus: Acarospora
- Species: A. pseudofuscata

Binomial name
- Acarospora pseudofuscata Sipman (2002)

Species of lichen

Acarospora pseudofuscata is a species of saxicolous (rock-dwelling) crustose lichen in the family Acarosporaceae. It occurs on a few islands in the Aegean Sea and in Turkey.

== Taxonomy ==
The lichen was formally described as a new species in 2002 by Dutch lichenologist Harrie Sipman. The type specimen was collected west of the village of Emborios on the island of Kalymnos, at an altitude of about 50 m (160 ft). There it was found growing on a northwest-facing slope with schistose rock outcrops and phrygana vegetation. The species epithet refers to its similarity with Acarospora fuscata.

== Description ==
Acarospora pseudofuscata has a dark brown, crustose thallus forming patches that are often over 10 cm (3.9 in) wide. The thallus is areolate, with individual, non-overlapping areoles measuring about 0.2–1 mm wide to about 0.5 mm thick. The cortex is 50–100 μm thick, and the algal layer (contains the photobiont partner) about 100 μm thick. The medulla consists of loose hyphae about 3 μm wide that is often densely covered with crystals measuring 1–5 μm in diameter. The lower cortex, roughly 20–50 μm thick, comprises dense, thick-walled, incompletely agglutinated hyphae with dark brown top layer that is with about 3–10 μm thick. The ascomata occur mostly singly in the areoles, into which they are immersed. They start out rounded, with a diameter of 0.1–0.2 mm, eventually growing to mostly fill the areole with a dark brown, slightly depressed, smooth disc. Each ascus contains several hundred ascospores, which individually measure 4–6 by 2–2.5 μm. The lichen contains gyrophoric acid and traces of lecanoric acid, which are lichen products that can be detected using thin-layer chromatography.

== Habitat and distribution ==
Acarospora pseudofuscata occurs on Santorini, Paros, Kalymnos, and Kos, all island groups in the Aegean Sea. It has been recorded at elevations between 50 and 400 m (160 and 1,310 ft), typically on the vertical faces of siliceous rocks and boulders. It has also been recorded from Turkey. Sipman suggests that it may be more widely distributed but it may be confused with the more widespread Acarospora fuscata.
