= Acarospora dissecta =

Scientific classification
- Kingdom: Fungi
- Division: Ascomycota
- Class: Lecanoromycetes
- Order: Acarosporales
- Family: Acarosporaceae
- Genus: Acarospora
- Species: A. dissecta

Binomial name
- Acarospora dissecta K.Knudsen & Flakus (2011)

Species of lichen

Acarospora dissecta is a species of saxicolous (rock-dwelling), crustose lichen in the family Acarosporaceae. It grows on volcanic rock in high-altitude regions of the Andes. Its distinguishing features include a crust-like formation of dispersed areoles, a unique combination of organic acids, and a distinctive fissuring pattern. This lichen thrives in the semi-desert, high Andean areas, and currently, its known distribution is limited to specific areas in Bolivia.

== Taxonomy ==
The species Acarospora dissecta was described in 2011 by lichenologists Kerry Knudsen and Adam Flakus. The species epithet dissecta alludes to the characteristic splitting of the cortex in mature squamules. The type specimen was found near the Mallku Villamar village in the Potosí Department, Nor Lípez Province region of Bolivia, located in an open, semi-desert high Andean area at an altitude of 4,038 m (13,248 ft).

Phylogenetically, A. dissecta appears closely related to A. altoandina. The two species are similar in general appearance and morphology, but they differ in their secondary chemistry and hymenium height.

== Description ==
Acarospora dissecta has a crustose thallus with light to dark brown areoles, round to angular, extending from endosubstratic (i.e., from beneath the substrate) hyphae or dividing vegetatively. Its upper and lateral surfaces feature an abundance of cross-hatched fissures, with the lower surface exhibiting a pale, white to light brown colour. It forms a cortex derived from hyphal bundles penetrating the algal layer and houses algal cells within interrupted layers. The medulla is indistinct in this species.

Distinctive are the apothecia, usually one per areole or squamule, with a brown, rugulose, and typically epruinose disc. The asci of A. dissecta contain around 200 ascospores per ascus. The ascospores are simple (i.e., lacking septa), hyaline, and mostly ellipsoid in shape; their dimensions are 4–6 by 2.0–2.5 μm.

One important chemical trait of Acarospora dissecta is the presence of norstictic acid, a lichen product that was detected in all collected specimens. This is used as a distinguishing feature between A. dissecta and other Acarospora species. The expected results of standard chemical spot tests on the medulla are K+ (yellow then red) and C−.

== Habitat and distribution ==
Acarospora dissecta favours an environment of volcanic rock in high, arid elevations, specifically in the Andes, in an exposed location. At the time of its publication, it known distribution was limited to two localities in Bolivia, at an elevation near 4,000 m (13,000 ft). Despite this limited observed distribution, it is speculated to have a broader presence on the Altiplano plateau, and the authors have also suggested that it may also occur in similar habitat in Colorado, based on collections made from there that were morphologically similar and also contained norstictic acid.

== Similar species ==
Acarospora dissecta bears a close resemblance to A. altoandina, especially in the appearance and structure of the squamules. However, differences in secondary chemistry and the height of the hymenium differentiate the two species. The A. dissecta produces norstictic acid and has a hymenium height of 170–200 μm, while A. altoandina lacks secondary metabolites and presents a shorter hymenium.

Four other brown Acarosporaceae species reported from South America also produce norstictic acid: A. rouxii, A. lorentzii, A. brasiliensis, and Silobia smaragdula. A. dissecta differentiates from these species due to various characteristics, such as its specific secondary chemistry, hymenium height, ascospore quantity and size, and unique fissuring of the cortex in mature squamules.
