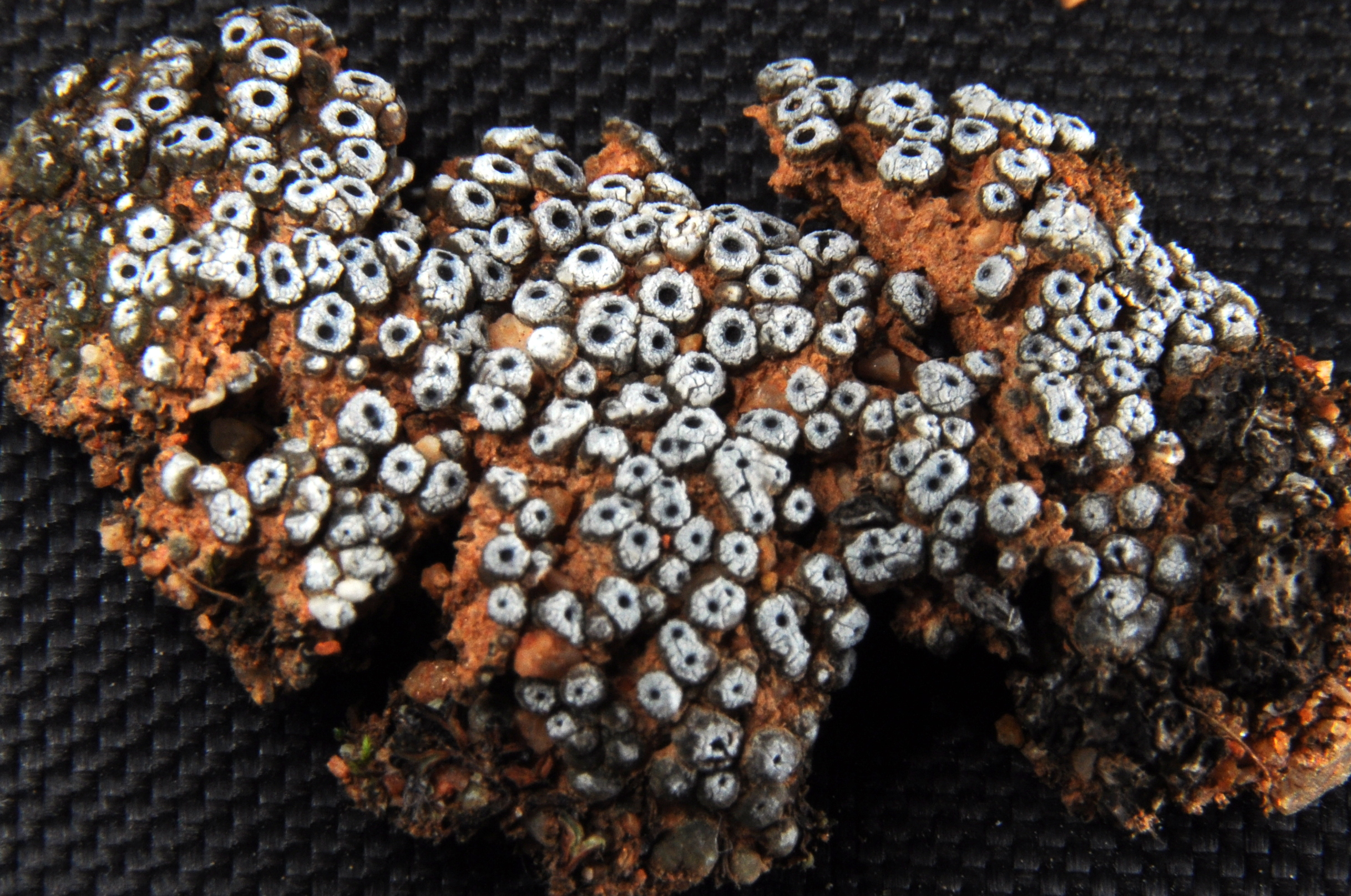

Scientific classification
- Domain: Eukaryota
- Kingdom: Fungi
- Division: Ascomycota
- Class: Lecanoromycetes
- Order: Acarosporales
- Family: Acarosporaceae
- Genus: Acarospora
- Species: A. thelococcoides

Binomial name
- Acarospora thelococcoides (Nyl.) Zahlbr. (1927)

Synonyms
- Lecanora thelococcoides Nyl. (1891)

= Acarospora thelococcoides =

Species of lichen

Acarospora thelococcoides is a pruinose (dusty whitish) verruculose (warty) crustose lichen that grows in patches up to 10 cm across that grows on soil (terricolous), especially soils made from decomposed granite. It grows from San Benito, California to Baja California, and inland to 930 metres (3,050 ft). Each roundish areole becomes more pruinose toward the top and typically has a single round apothecium that is immersed with a dark brown disc, so as to appear like a collection of white rings. This appearance gives it the common name, soil eyes lichen.

The asci are saccate, with variable numbers of spherical ascospores. Lichen spot tests are all negative, and it is UV-. It is an indicator of undisturbed soil habitats.
