= Acarospora oligyrophorica =

Scientific classification
- Kingdom: Fungi
- Division: Ascomycota
- Class: Lecanoromycetes
- Order: Acarosporales
- Family: Acarosporaceae
- Genus: Acarospora
- Species: A. oligyrophorica

Binomial name
- Acarospora oligyrophorica Aptroot (2002)

Species of lichen

Acarospora oligyrophorica is a species of saxicolous (rock-dwelling), crustose lichen in the family Acarosporaceae. Described as new to science in 2002, it is found in Minas Gerais, Brazil.

== Taxonomy ==
Acarospora oligyrophorica was described as a new species by the Dutch lichenologist André Aptroot in 2002. It is part of the Acarospora oligospora-group, which is defined by having fewer than 50 spores per ascus. The species epithet oligyrophorica highlights its unique chemical composition, containing gyrophoric acid, distinguishing it from other members in its group.

== Description ==
The thallus of Acarospora oligyrophorica is crustose, measuring 1–3 cm (0.39–1.18 in) in diameter, and typically appears sandy brown, sometimes with a pale hue. It features areolate (divided into distinct patches) formations, each surrounded by a brown hypothallus about 0.5 mm (0.020 in) wide, occasionally showing isolated areoles. The species is found growing on siliceous rock along mountain streams but is not submerged.

Apothecia (fruiting bodies) are cup-shaped (cupulate) but nearly perithecioid (closed, flask-shaped fruiting bodies typical of some lichens), with a narrow disc and range from chocolate brown to nearly black, hemispherically protruding from the areole. Ascospores number approximately 40 per ascus, and are hyaline (translucent), simple, and ovoid to long-ellipsoid, surrounded by a 1 μm wide gelatinous sheath, measuring 10–15 by 3–5 μm.

The chemical spot tests for this species are K− and C+ (red), indicating the presence of gyrophoric acid.

== Habitat and distribution ==
Acarospora oligyrophorica is known from its type locality in Minas Gerais, Brazil, particularly around the Serra do Caraça at the Parque Natural do Caraça near the Santuário do Caraça monastery. It grows primarily on siliceous rocks in environments close to mountain streams, alongside species in genera such as Usnea and Xanthoparmelia.
