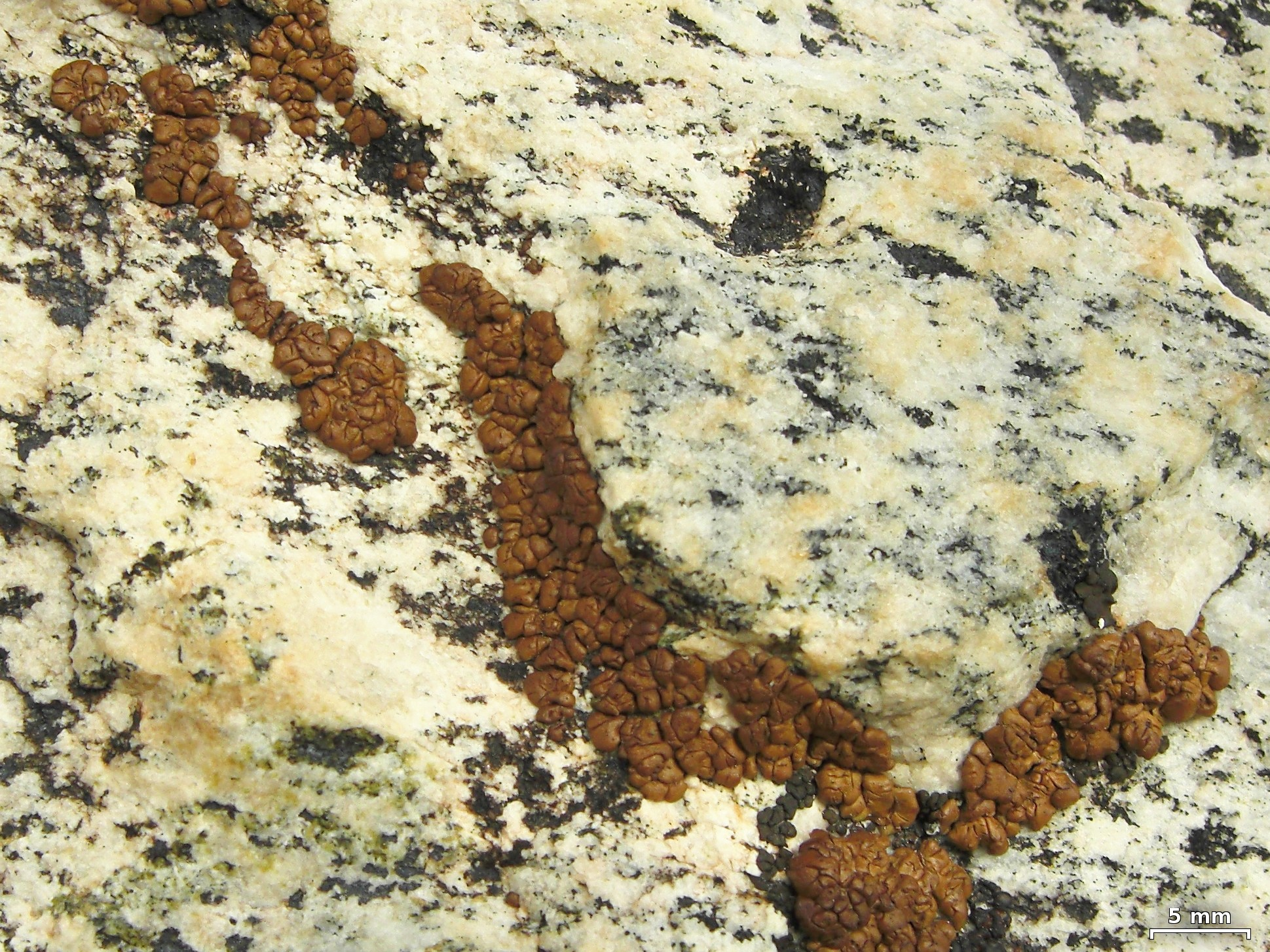

Scientific classification
- Kingdom: Fungi
- Division: Ascomycota
- Class: Lecanoromycetes
- Order: Acarosporales
- Family: Acarosporaceae
- Genus: Acarospora
- Species: A. thamnina

Binomial name
- Acarospora thamnina (Tuck.) Herre (1913)

Synonyms
- Lecanora cervina b thamnina Tuck. (1882)

= Acarospora thamnina =

Species of fungus

Acarospora thamnina is a shiny, black tinged, variously brown squamulose crustose lichen. It has a linear growth pattern, growing along cracks in boulders. It can be found in North America to Alaska and Maine, from the coast to inland locations, also in the Ural Mountains and Novaya Zemlya in Russia. It commonly grows either among, or on other lichens. It grows a longer stipe so its squamules can grow over other lichens when there is competition for space. When it forms thick clumps it is easily identified with its elevated squamules and thick stipes. It grows on acidic rock in full sunlight.

Sometimes members of the same population will be different shades of brown. It may be many different kinds of brown, with reddish-brown to yellowish-brown specimens growing on the same rock. Irregular 0.3-1.5 mm in diameter squamules sometimes grow as lobes. There are 0-1 or more round to irregular apothecia, up to 0.5 mm wide, on each squamule, with rough and black discs that are sometimes surrounded by elevated margins of thallus tissue. Apothecia variably grow from large and obvious lecanorine discs, to being immersed in the squamule. The asci are club shaped (clavate) with about 100 or more spores. Lichen spot tests are strongly C+ and KC+ red in the cortex. Secondary metabolites include gyrophoric acid, some lecanoric acid, and traces of 3-hydroxygyrophoric acid and methyl lecanorate.
