= Acarospora elevata =

Scientific classification
- Domain: Eukaryota
- Kingdom: Fungi
- Division: Ascomycota
- Class: Lecanoromycetes
- Order: Acarosporales
- Family: Acarosporaceae
- Genus: Acarospora
- Species: A. elevata

Binomial name
- Acarospora elevata H.Magn. (1929)

Species of fungus

Acarospora elevata, the mountain cobblestone lichen, is a shiny dark reddish brown to dark brown verrucose to aereolate crustose lichen that grows up to 3 cm (1.2 in) wide on granite in central and southern California to Baja California, and high elevations in the Rocky Mountains. It is usually only found above 1,400 metres (4,600 ft) because it is eaten by red mites at lower elevations. In the Californias, it is mostly found at high elevations (hence "elevata"), but sometimes in coastal locations where it is less glossy. It grows in full sun, mostly on hard granite, but sometimes other igneous or carbonate rock, from 500 to 3,350 metres (1,640 to 10,990 ft) in elevation. It may start by growing on members of the genus Aspicilia, or other such pioneer species on hard rocks.

There are typically between zero and four apothecia on each areola or wart, with dark red or black, rough surfaced, flat to concave discs without a dusty looking surface pruina. The asci are thicker at the top than at the base (clavate).

Lichen spot test are all negative, and it is UV− under ultraviolet light. It may be identical with type of Acarospora nitida. The lower-elevation forms were originally called Thelocarpon albomarginatum and A. washingtonensis.

Acarospora is in the family Acarosporaceae. A. elevata was first described scientifically by lichenologist Adolf Hugo Magnusson in 1929.
