= Acarospora brodoana =

Scientific classification
- Kingdom: Fungi
- Division: Ascomycota
- Class: Lecanoromycetes
- Order: Acarosporales
- Family: Acarosporaceae
- Genus: Acarospora
- Species: A. brodoana

Binomial name
- Acarospora brodoana K.Knudsen, Kocourk. & M.Westb. (2016)

Species of lichen-forming fungus

Acarospora brodoana is a species of saxicolous (rock-dwelling) crustose lichen in the family Acarosporaceae. It was described as a new species in 2016 from specimens collected in the San Bernardino Mountains in southern California. The type specimen was collected on granite from a steep terraced slope above the cirque near Dollar Lake. The species epithet honors the lichenologist Irwin M. Brodo. The lichen is distinguished from similar species by the combination of a blackened upper ascospore-bearing surface (carbonized epihymenium) and a black tissue layer beneath the spore-bearing region (hypothecium).
