= Acarospora janae =

Scientific classification
- Kingdom: Fungi
- Division: Ascomycota
- Class: Lecanoromycetes
- Order: Acarosporales
- Family: Acarosporaceae
- Genus: Acarospora
- Species: A. janae

Binomial name
- Acarospora janae K.Knudsen (2011)

Species of lichen-forming fungus

Acarospora janae is a species of saxicolous (rock-dwelling) crustose lichen in the family Acarosporaceae. Described as new to science in 2011, it is known from the United States and Canada, where it grows on rock.

== Taxonomy ==
The lichen was first described scientifically in a 2011 issue of the journal Phytotaxa, one of 100 new species authored by 102 contributors from 35 countries. The type collection was made in Las Vegas (San Miguel County, New Mexico) in 1927 by Arsène Brouard. The specific epithet janae refers to Jana Kocourkova, colleague and fiancée of the species author Kerry Knudsen.

In a later revision, Knudsen and coauthors reported additional eastern North American records of A. janae and concluded that earlier North American reports of Acarospora gallica by Adolf Hugo Magnusson actually represent A. janae; on that basis they excluded A. gallica from the North American lichen funga. They also treated the unpublished name Acarospora "punctata" (used informally in an Ozark lichen identification key) as applying to material now referred to A. janae.

== Description ==
The lichen thallus (body) consists of dispersed areoles (a small rounded area that is more or less polygonal or angular, and delimited by cracks) that are dark to light brown in color. The surface of the areoles often have fine grooves. The disc of the apothecium (a round, plate-like spore-producing part of the fruit body) has a rough texture and is either the same color as the thallus or darker. It sometimes has umbos and ridges, but these tend to disappear as the disc fully dilates. The hymenium (spore-bearing tissue) is about 100 μm thick and contains paraphyses that have a diameter of 2 μm μm. The asci (spore-bearing cells) are club-shaped, measure 60 by 20 μm, and contain roughly 100 ascospores. The spores are 3–4 by 2 μm μm.

Most specimens are epruinose (lacking a pale, powdery coating), although slight pruina has been observed in some collections. The species typically develops a single apothecium per areole, but in certain microhabitats an areole may temporarily produce several apothecia; these generally separate again as the areole divides into smaller units, each bearing one apothecium. The colour of the lower surface appears variable: it was described as white in the holotype, while an isotype (duplicate) is brown, and some eastern specimens have a darker, melanized lower surface that may reflect interaction with the substrate.

== Habitat and distribution ==
Acarospora janae grows on rock. It was described from sandstone at the type locality in New Mexico, and it has since been documented on a range of substrates including sandstone, granite, schist and gneiss, rhyolite and other igneous rocks, and locally on limestone or calcareous sandstone.

In addition to the original southwestern records (including New Mexico and Colorado), published records extend eastward across parts of the central and eastern United States; reported localities include Arkansas, Kansas, Georgia, Missouri, Oklahoma, Pennsylvania, North Carolina, and South Carolina. It has also been reported from Newfoundland in Canada.
