= Acarospora americana =

Scientific classification
- Domain: Eukaryota
- Kingdom: Fungi
- Division: Ascomycota
- Class: Lecanoromycetes
- Order: Acarosporales
- Family: Acarosporaceae
- Genus: Acarospora
- Species: A. americana

Binomial name
- Acarospora americana H.Magn. (1929)

Species of fungus

Acarospora americana is a dark brown to black verruculose to areolate or squamulose crustose lichen with deeply immersed reddish to blackish-brown apothecia found in the Sierra Nevada and other southern California mountain ranges. Lichen spot tests are all negative.
