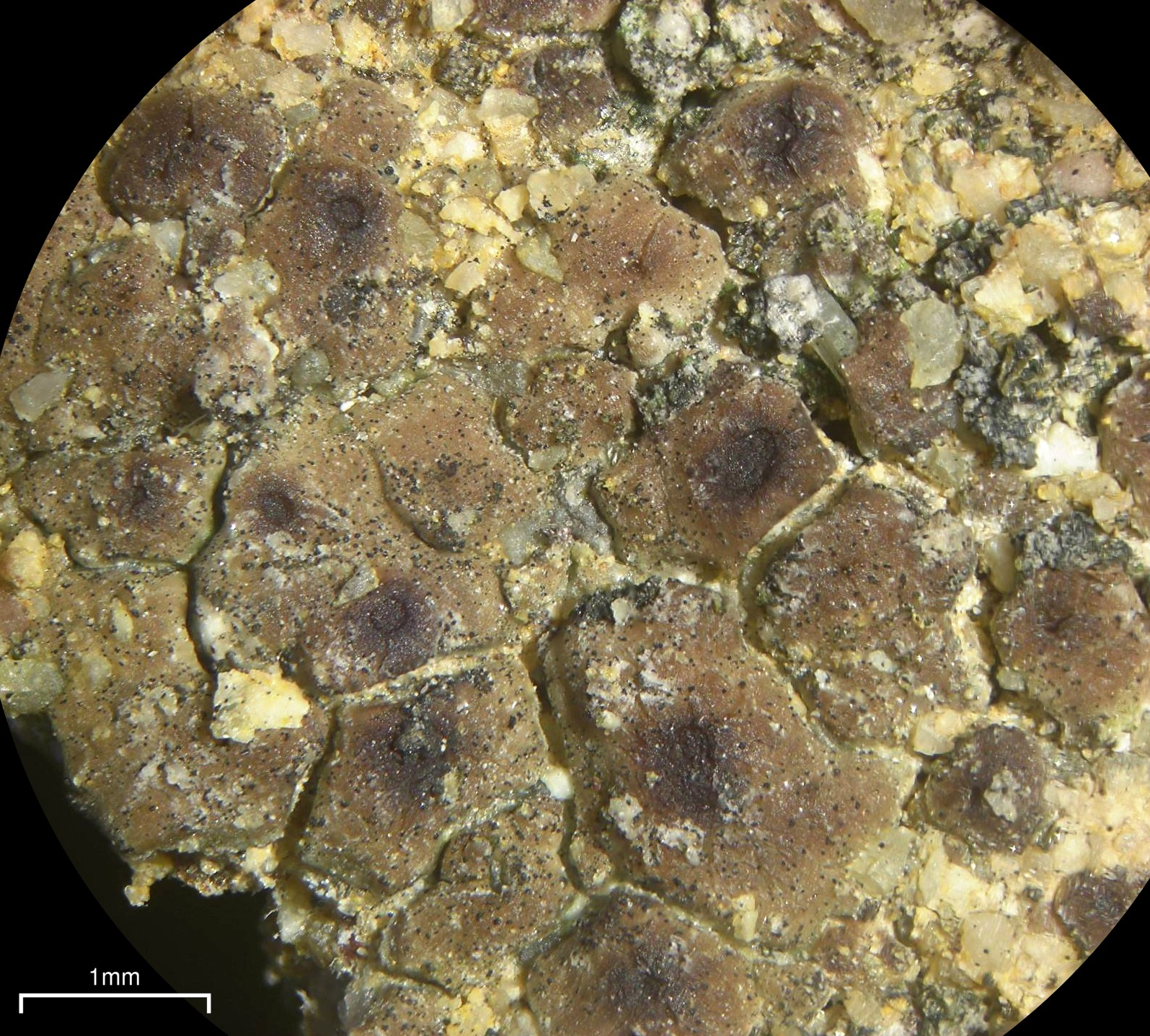
- Closeup of fertile areoles at 30X magnification

Scientific classification
- Domain: Eukaryota
- Kingdom: Fungi
- Division: Ascomycota
- Class: Lecanoromycetes
- Order: Acarosporales
- Family: Acarosporaceae
- Genus: Acarospora
- Species: A. obnubila

Binomial name
- Acarospora obnubila H.Magn. (1929)

= Acarospora obnubila =

Species of lichen

Acarospora obnubila ("cloudy cobblestone lichen") is a dull brown squamulose areolate crustose lichen that may grow up to 4 mm in diameter or with squamules scattered among other lichens. They are common in Arizona, southern California, and Baja California. They grow by themselves on acidic rock in full sunlight. Squamules measure up to 2 mm in diameter and are round to irregular, with have a stipe. They may also grow on members of the genus Aspicilia (lichenicolous). Competition for space with other lichens stimulates longer stipes to develop, whereby the squamules may overlay other lichens.

There are 0-16 apothecia per squamule, that may are pointlike (punctiform) with a reddish-brown round concave 0.1–0.3 mm disc that is deeply immersed in the thallus tissue. In very high elevations, the apothecia may rise as warty (verrucae) structure with thallus-like tissue (pseudo-lecanorine ) collaring discs that may be up to 1 mm diameter, with only one per squamule. Lichen spot tests are all negative, with no known secondary metabolites (as of 2014). A. obnubila was first described scientifically by lichenologist Adolf Hugo Magnusson in 1929.
