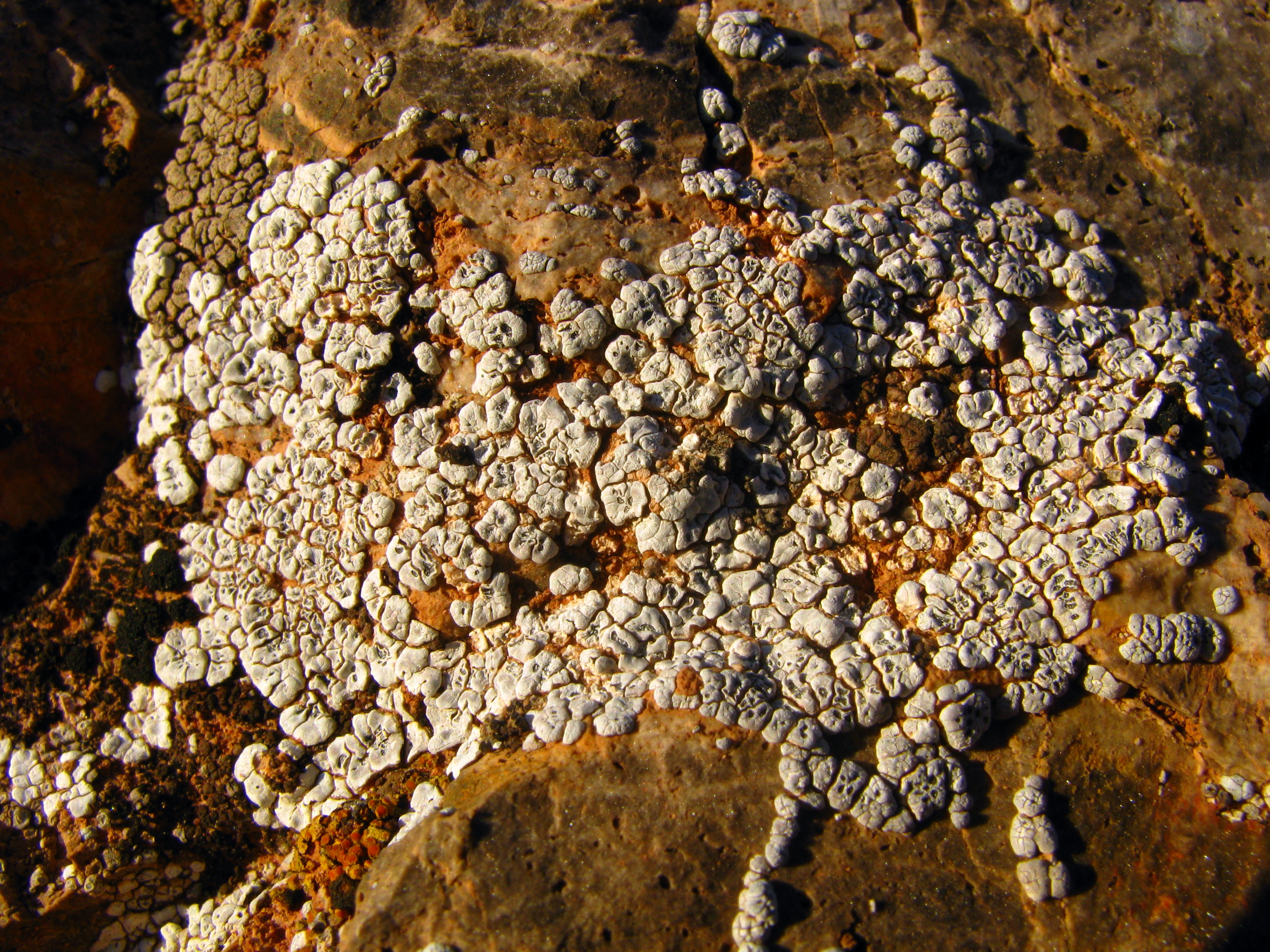

Conservation status
- Apparently Secure (NatureServe)

Scientific classification
- Kingdom: Fungi
- Division: Ascomycota
- Class: Lecanoromycetes
- Order: Acarosporales
- Family: Acarosporaceae
- Genus: Acarospora
- Species: A. strigata

Binomial name
- Acarospora strigata (Nyl.) Jatta (1906)

Synonyms
- Lecanora strigata Nyl. (1855)

= Acarospora strigata =

Species of fungus

Acarospora strigata is an areolate to verruculous crustose lichen that grows on rock around the world, in full sun or shade, and in mesic to arid habitats. It is brown but may appear white or pale gray if it is covered in a pruina. The lichen is common in southwestern deserts of North America.

Areoles (from tiny to 3 mm) surrounding dark reddish-brown to black apothecia (fruiting bodies) are both highly variable in shape and size, and variable in size relative to each other. Measuring 0.1–1 mm, the apothecia range in size from small dots on the areoles to almost as wide as the areole. They can be pointlike to round, polygonal to stellate radiating fissures, and one to many per areole.

Areoles may be cracked on the surface, especially toward the apothecia.

Lichen spot tests are all negative.
