= Acarospora flavisparsa =

Scientific classification
- Domain: Eukaryota
- Kingdom: Fungi
- Division: Ascomycota
- Class: Lecanoromycetes
- Order: Acarosporales
- Family: Acarosporaceae
- Genus: Acarospora
- Species: A. flavisparsa

Binomial name
- Acarospora flavisparsa V.J.Rico & Candan (2011)

Species of lichen

Acarospora flavisparsa is a species of lichen in the family Acarosporaceae. Found in Portugal and Spain, it was described as new to science in 2011. The lichen grows on acidic rock walls in inland areas.

== Taxonomy ==
Acarospora flavisparsa was described as a new species in the journal Phytotaxa in 2011. The type collection was made in San Lorenzo de El Escorial, a town and municipality in the Community of Madrid, Spain, in 1986. The specific epithet flavisparsa refers to the yellow squamules of the thallus.

== Description ==
The thallus (body) is either areolate–meaning it is a cracked crust separated into segments (areoles)–or squamulose (containing scale-like lobes that are usually small and overlapping). Areoles have an irregular shape, and measure 0.5–3.5 mm in diameter and up to 2.25 mm thick. These areoles frequently form a short stipe and become squamulose. The color of the upper surface of the thallus ranges from yellow to greenish-yellow. The upper cortex is 40–125 μm thick and made of more or less globular cells arranged in several layers; the upper layers of cells contain yellow pigment, while the lower cell layers are hyaline (translucent). Underneath the cortex are a layer of algal cells up to 200 μm thick with cells that are 6–15 μm wide. The asci (spore-bearing cells) are club-shaped, contain more than 100 spores, and measure 70–130 by 18–30 μm. The spores are cylindrical to elongated in shape, hyaline, and have dimensions of 4–7.5 by 1.5–3.5 μm.

== Habitat and distribution ==
The lichen grow on acidic rock walls located in inland areas. Collections have been made from more or less vertical rock walls at altitudes ranging from 550 to 1,480 metres (1,800 to 4,860 ft). Other lichen species that are typically associated with Acarospora flavisparsa include Protoparmelia montagnei, and, to a lesser extent, Dimelaena oreina. A. flavisparsa is known to occur only in Portugal and Spain, in continental Mediterranean areas.
