= Acarospora bullata =

Scientific classification
- Kingdom: Fungi
- Division: Ascomycota
- Class: Lecanoromycetes
- Order: Acarosporales
- Family: Acarosporaceae
- Genus: Acarospora
- Species: A. bullata

Binomial name
- Acarospora bullata H.Magn. (1868)

Species of fungus

Acarospora bullata, commonly known as cracked lichen, is a species of lichen in the Acarosporaceae family. The British Lichen Society wrote in 2010 that Acarospora bullata, when seen in North America, has been described as conspecific to Acarospora rugulosa. This species is also known to be conspecific with Acarospora subcastenae and Acarospora mendozana.

== Taxonomy ==
A. bullata can be recognized by examining its unique thallus and fan-like lobes. This fungi will also have a KC+ positive reaction for gyrophoric acid located in its cortex, rugulose apothecial discs, and often can be found either on cliffsides or growing from non-calcareous rock.

Because A. bullata is conspecific with A. rugulosa, samples of the fungi have been taken from the Joshua Tree National Park for analysis. Before 2019, it was believed that A. rugulosa was the only species of the genus to grow in North or South America.

== Habitat and distribution ==
While originally known to be seen in Europe and Asia, A. bullata has been spotted growing in North America around southeastern Ontario, Canada in 2019. This species prefers to grow on cliffsides, where it is protected from the elements and shielded from potential fire. This also allows for this lichen to grow in many countries around the world.

In Siberia, Rhizocarpon norvegicum has been observed to have a parasitic relationship with A. bullata. This species of Rhizocarpon was studied growing on A. bullata in 2017. A. Bullata can also be found in the Hemis National Park in Ladakh.

DNA Sequencing was also done on A. Bullata in Germany with reference number NHM07, displaying an ITS rDNA of DQ374126, mt SSU rDNA of DQ374102, and β-tubulin DNA of EU870744.
