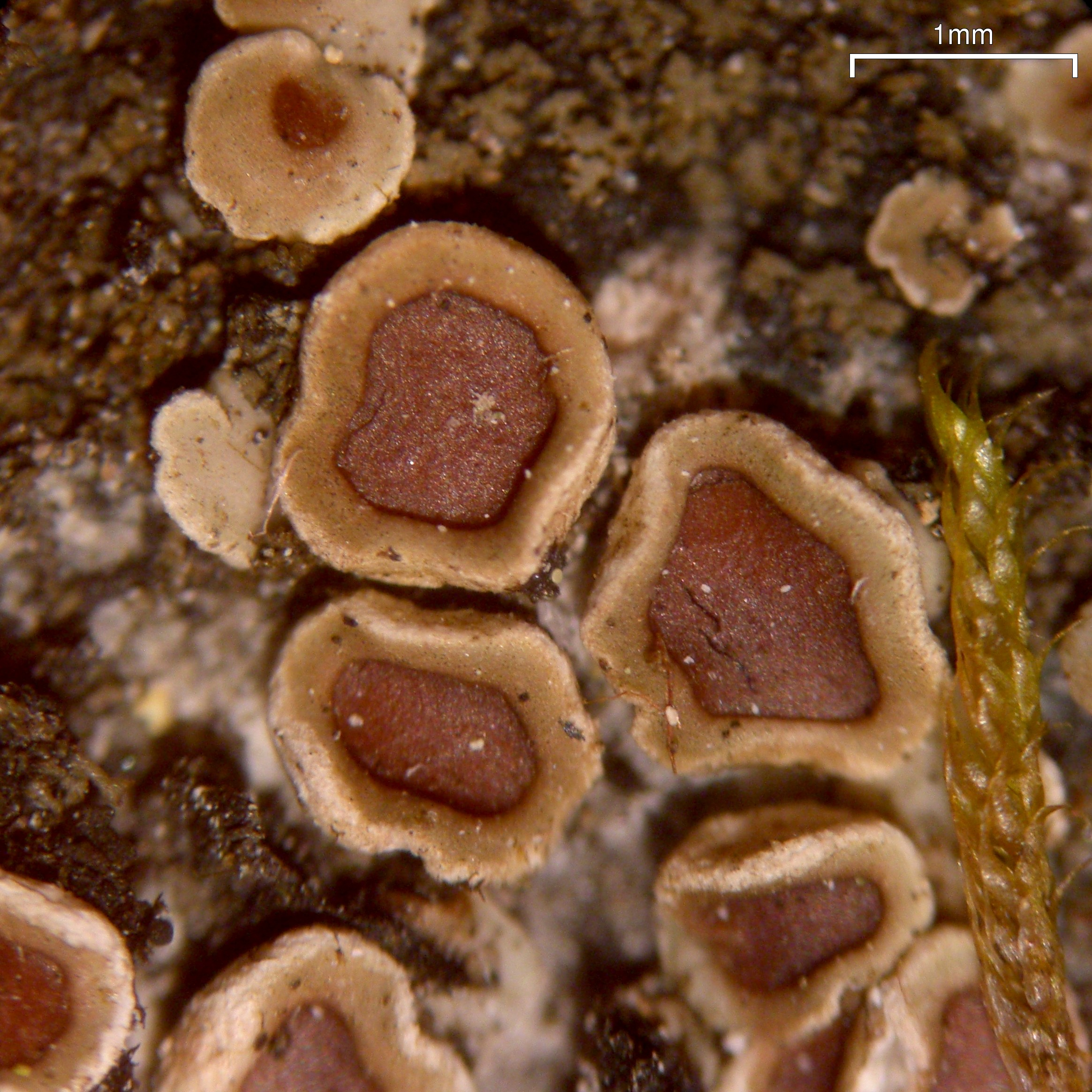
- Acarospora glaucocarpa

Scientific classification
- Kingdom: Fungi
- Division: Ascomycota
- Class: Lecanoromycetes
- Order: Acarosporales
- Family: Acarosporaceae
- Genus: Acarospora; A.Massal. (1852)

Type species
- Acarospora schleicheri (Ach.) A.Massal. (1852)

Synonyms
- Polysporinopsis Vězda (2002)

= Acarospora =

Genus of fungi

Acarospora is a genus of mostly lichen-forming fungi in the family Acarosporaceae. Most species in the genus are crustose lichens that grow on rocks in open and arid places all over the world. They may look like a cobblestone road or cracked up old paint, and are commonly called cobblestone lichens or cracked lichens. They usually grow on rock (are "saxicolous"), but some grow on soil (terricolous) or on other lichens. Some species in the genus are fungi that live as parasites on other lichens (lichenicolous fungi). Acarospora is a widely distributed genus, with about 128 species according to a 2008 estimate.

Species in Acarospora may be shiny as if covered with a glossy varnish, or dull and powdery looking. They have a diverse range of colors, from the brilliant yellow bright cobblestone lichen, to the dark reddish-brown mountain cobblestone lichen, or they can appear tan, gray, or white, from a dusty-looking coating (pruina). They may grow in crustose forms like a warty surface (verrucose), like cracking-up old crust of paint (rimose), like a bunch of "islands" in a dry lake bed (areolate), like the flakes of cracking up paint are peeling up at the edges (sub-squamulous), or like the flakes are growing over others like scales (squamulous).

== Description ==
They may grow as a warty crust (verrucose, a cracked crust rimose, or with the cracks separating island-like sections like in a dried lake (areolate – with the "islands" being called areoles). The areolas may lift up at the edges (sub-squamulose), and these edges may overlap other areolas like scales (squamulose, with the areoles being called squamules). The areoles may grow in lobes radiating from a center (placodioid. They may grow in irregular or indeterminate forms, sometimes with the areoles disconnected from each other and dispersed among other lichens. Sometimes the squamules may be elevated with expansion of the mycelial base above the substrate ("gomphate"), or aside on "stems" called stipes, which are usually about usually half the diameter of areole. The outer rim of the areola is usually down-turned.

They may be shiny or dull, and in many shades from pale to blackish brown. They may be smooth or rough (rugulose). They may be different colors from brilliant yellow (from rhizocarpic acid) to brown to white. They may or may not be covered with a powdery-looking surface (pruinose), which when present, may make them appear lighter in color, to almost white.

=== Internal structure ===
Like other crustose lichens, their cross-section is generally divided into three layers, the cortex, photobiont layer, and medulla, and generally without a lower cortex as in foliose lichens. The cortex itself is usually differentiated, with three layers including a syncortex, epinecral layer, and eucortex, which is where the pigment is located in the upper parts. Photobionts of Acarospora are green algae in the genus Trebouxia.

=== Fruiting structures ===
Each wart, areole, or squamule may have 0 to many apothecia. The apothecia are usually immersed in the thallus. Sometimes the apothecia are raised on a wart and surrounded by a margin of thallus-like tissue, sometimes with the margin being a true exciple. The apothecia are usually immersed, and round to very irregular in shape. The apothecial disc is round to squished and irregular, and ranges in colors: black, brown, red, or yellow, or in-between. The disc may be smooth or it may be rough. The asci range from being narrow to being club-shaped (clavate). Spores are colorless, spherical to ellipsoid, and range from tens to hundreds per ascus.

== Taxonomy ==
The genus was published by the Italian lichenologist Abramo Bartolommeo Massalongo in 1852, with the type species Acarospora schleicheri (originally described as Urceolaria schleicheri by Erik Acharius in 1810). Other species included by Massalongo in his original conception of the genus were A. chlorophana (now Pleopsidium chlorophanum), A. oxytona, A. cervina, A. smeragdula, and A. veronensis.

== Species ==
Yellow members of the genus may resemble members of Pleopsidium. Non-yellow members may resemble members of Aspicilia.

Species include:

- Acarospora adscendens Cl. Roux & Poumarat
- Acarospora affinis K.Knudsen
- Acarospora americana H.Magn.
- Acarospora asahinae H.Magn.
- Acarospora badiofusca (Nyl.) Th.Fr.
- Acarospora bolleana (H. Magn.) K. Knudsen, J.N. Adams, Kocourk. & Y. Wang
- Acarospora boulderensis H.Magn.
- Acarospora brattiae K.Knudsen
- Acarospora brodoana K.Knudsen
- Acarospora brouardii B.de Lesd.
- Acarospora bullata H.Magn
- Acarospora calcarea K.Knudsen
- Acarospora canadensis H.Magn.
- Acarospora cervina A.Massal.
- Acarospora chrysops (Tuck.) H.Magn.
- Acarospora citrina (Taylor) Zahlbr.
- Acarospora clauzadeana (Llimona) Casares & Hafellner
- Acarospora coloradiana H.Magn.
- Acarospora complanata H.Magn.
- Acarospora conafii P. Jung & B. Büde
- Acarospora contigua H.Magn.
- Acarospora depressa H.Magn
- Acarospora dissecta K.Knudsen & Flakus
- Acarospora elevata H.Magn.
- Acarospora epiaspicilia Cl. Roux & M. Bertrand
- Acarospora epilutescens Zahlbr.
- Acarospora episulphurata Cl. Roux & S. Poumarat
- Acarospora erythrophora H.Magn.
- Acarospora flavisparsa V.J.Rico & Candan
- Acarospora fuscata (Schrader) Arnold
- Acarospora fuscescens H.Magn.
- Acarospora glaucocarpa (Ach.) Körber
- Acarospora heufleriana Körber
- Acarospora hilaris (Dufour) Hue
- Acarospora impressula Th.Fr.
- Acarospora interjecta H.Magn.
- Acarospora janae K.Knudsen
- Acarospora leavittii K.Knudsen & Hollinger
- Acarospora lendemeri K.Knudsen & Kocourk.
- Acarospora maccarthyi K.Knudsen & Kocourk.
- Acarospora macrospora (Hepp) A.Massal. ex Bagl.
- Acarospora moenium (Vainio) Räsänen
- Acarospora molybdina (Wahlenb.) Trevisan
- Acarospora nashii K.Knudsen
- Acarospora nevadensis H.Magn.
- Acarospora nicolai B.de Lesd.
- Acarospora nitrophila H.Magn.
- Acarospora nodulosa (Dufour) Hue
- Acarospora novomexicana H.Magn.
- Acarospora obnubila H.Magn.
- Acarospora obpallens (Nyl. ex Hasse) Zahlbr.
- Acarospora oligospora (Nyl.) Arnold
- Acarospora oligyrophorica Aptroot (2002) – Brazil
- Acarospora orcuttii K.Knudsen
- Acarospora oreophila K.Knudsen
- Acarospora organensis K.Knudsen, Kocourk., Hodková & Yan Wang
- Acarospora peliscypha Th.Fr.
- Acarospora piedmontensis K.Knudsen
- Acarospora poumaratii Cl. Roux
- Acarospora pseudofuscata Sipman
- Acarospora pseudosuzae Cl. Roux & J.-Y. Monnat
- Acarospora robiniae K.Knudsen
- Acarospora rosulata (Th.Fr.) H.Magn.
- Acarospora rouxii K.Knudsen, Elix & Reeb
- Acarospora rugulosa Körber
- Acarospora saepincola H.Magn.
- Acarospora schleicheri (Ach.) A.Massal.
- Acarospora scotica Hue
- Acarospora scottii K.Knudsen & Kocourk.
- Acarospora sinopica (Wahlenb.) Körber
- Acarospora socialis H.Magn.
- Acarospora sparsa H.Magn.
- Acarospora sphaerosperma R.C. Harris & K.Knudsen
- Acarospora stapfiana (Müll.Arg.) Hue
- Acarospora stictica K.Knudsen & Elix
- Acarospora strigata (Nyl.) Jatta
- Acarospora subrufula (Nyl.) H.Olivier
- Acarospora succedens H.Magn.
- Acarospora superfusca H.Magn.
- Acarospora thamnina (Tuck.) Herre
- Acarospora thelococcoides (Nyl.) Zahlbr.
- Acarospora toensbergii K.Knudsen & Kocourk.
- Acarospora tongletii Hue
- Acarospora tuckerae K. Knudsen
- Acarospora umbilicata Bagl.
- Acarospora veronensis A.Massal.
- Acarospora verruciformis H.Magn.
- Acarospora wetmorei K.Knudsen

== Chemistry ==
Acarospora species often lack secondary metabolites (lichen products). Each wart, areola, or squamule may each have zero to many apothecia. Some have norstictic acid, gyrophoric acid, or fatty acids. Yellow species have rhizocarpic acid, a pigment that makes them yellow.

== Range and habitat ==
They grow all over the world, but usually in open arid habitats. They can grow on acidic rock and basic rock, or on soil.
