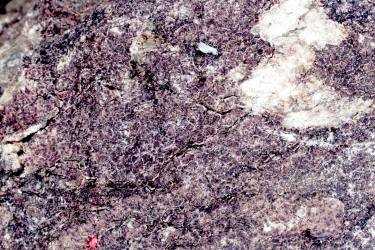

Conservation status
- Secure (NatureServe)

Scientific classification
- Kingdom: Fungi
- Division: Ascomycota
- Class: Lecanoromycetes
- Order: Acarosporales
- Family: Acarosporaceae
- Genus: Acarospora
- Species: A. fuscata

Binomial name
- Acarospora fuscata (Nyl.) Th.Fr. (1871)

Synonyms
- Lichen fuscatus Schrad. (1794); Lecanora badia var. fuscata Ach. (1810); Lecanora fuscata Röhl. (1813); Lecanora fuscata Nyl. (1863); Acarospora veronensis var. fuscata (Nyl.) Arnold (1870)

= Acarospora fuscata =

Species of fungus

Acarospora fuscata ("brown cobblestone lichen") is a glossy pale or yellowish-brown areolate lichen with angular areolas that grows up to 10 cm (4 in) wide on non-calcareous rock in low and high elevations. It grows in Europe and North America. It grows in southern California and on the eastern part of the Sierra Nevada range. It may grow with the areolas disconnected. The areolas may lift at the edges, but the areolas do not overlap like true squamules (sub-squamulose). More common in the Sierras is the similar species Acarospora thamnina, which is truly squamulose with overlapping scales.

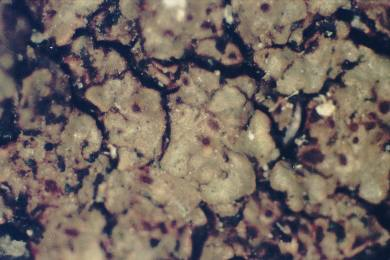
Acarospora fuscata

It usually has 0-1 apothecium per areole, which may be point-like (punctiform) or fill the entire areole with a disc that is rough surfaced and reddish brown. The asci are club shaped (clavate), with over 100 spores. Lichen spot tests are K−, C+ vaguely pink, KC+ red, and P−. Secondary metabolites include gyrophoric acid.
