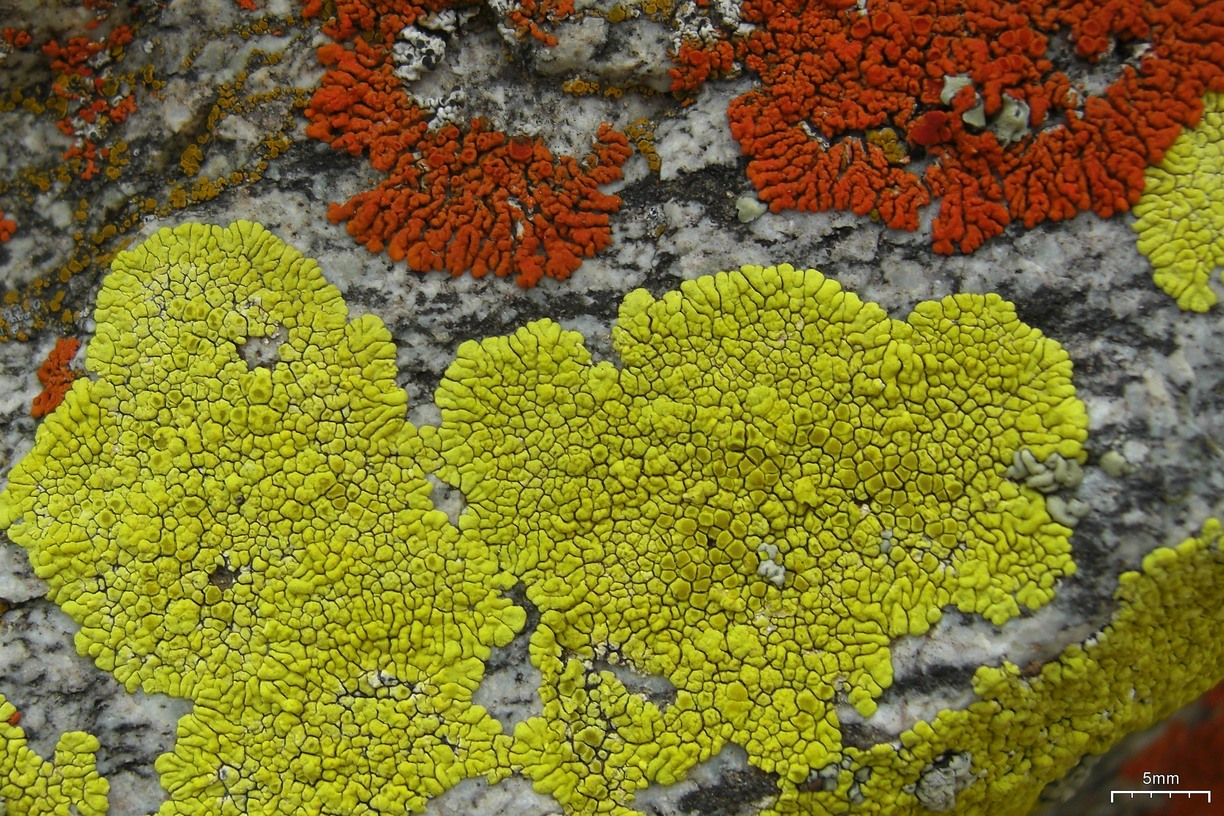

Scientific classification
- Domain: Eukaryota
- Kingdom: Fungi
- Division: Ascomycota
- Class: Lecanoromycetes
- Order: Acarosporales
- Family: Acarosporaceae
- Genus: Acarospora
- Species: A. contigua

Binomial name
- Acarospora contigua H.Magn. (1929)

= Acarospora contigua =

Species of lichen

Acarospora contigua is a species of saxicolous (rock-dwelling), crustose lichen in the family Acarosporaceae. It was formally described as a new species in 1929 by Swedish lichenologist Adolf Hugo Magnusson. The dark yellow thallus has a continuous smooth crust comprising areoles that are 1–2.5 mm in diameter. In North America, it is known as the gold cobblestone lichen. The lichen was reported from the Eastern Ghats India in 2021, where it occurs in tropical conditions at elevations between 500 and 1,000 m (1,600 and 3,300 ft).
