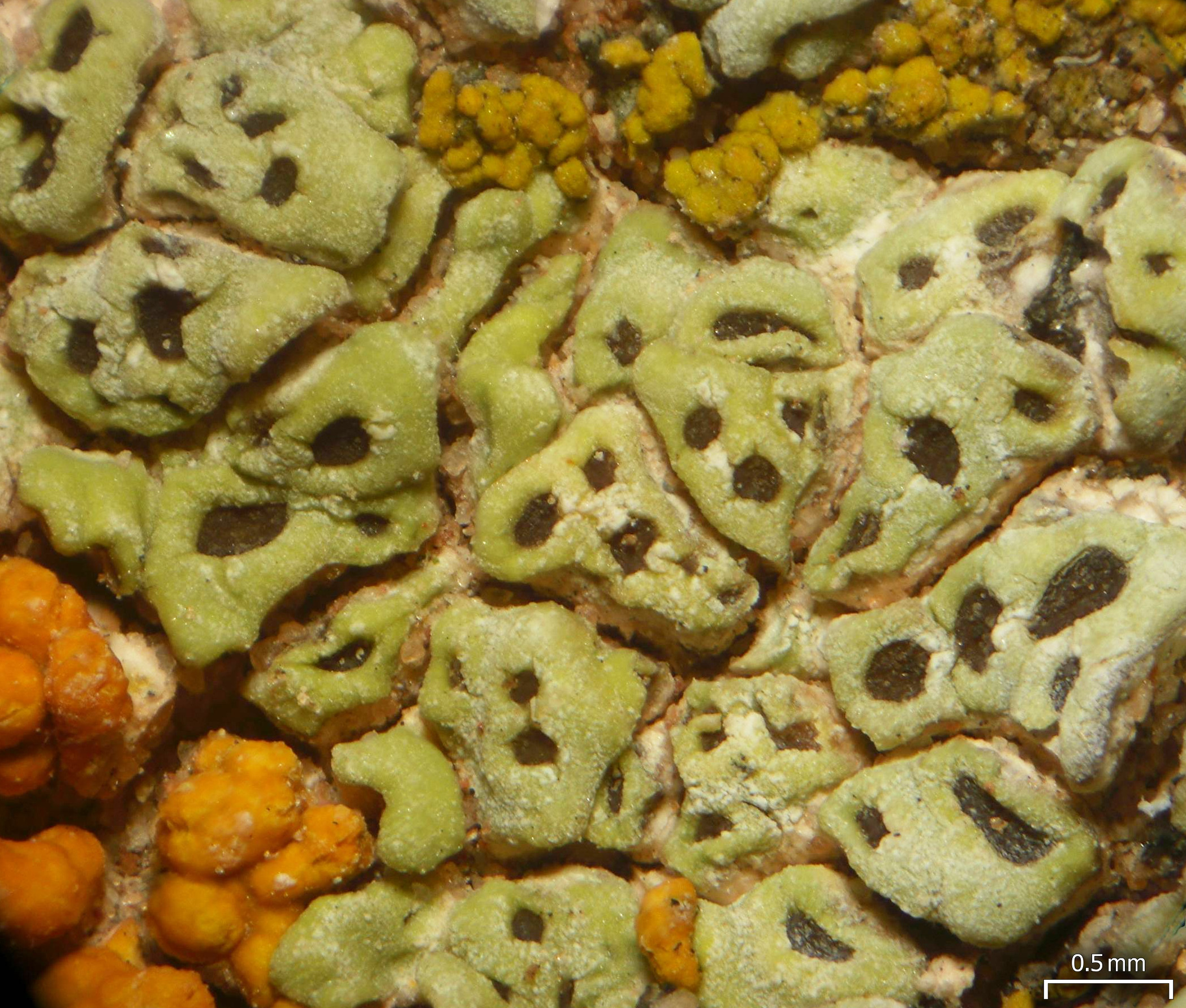

Scientific classification
- Kingdom: Fungi
- Division: Ascomycota
- Class: Lecanoromycetes
- Order: Acarosporales
- Family: Acarosporaceae
- Genus: Acarospora
- Species: A. stapfiana

Binomial name
- Acarospora stapfiana (Müll.Arg.) Hue (1909)

Synonyms
- Placodium stapfianum Müll.Arg. (1892)

= Acarospora stapfiana =

Species of lichen

Acarospora stapfiana, the hoary cobblestone lichen, is a lichenicolous (lichen-dwelling) lichen species in the family Acarosporaceae. It is known for its parasitic relationship with members of the genus Caloplaca. The species has a unique life cycle in which it starts as a juvenile non-lichenised fungus before forming a fully lichenised thallus. It is found in Asia and North America, where it grows on calcareous rocks.

== Taxonomy ==
This species was first described by Johannes Müller Argoviensis in 1892, who initially classified it in the genus Placodium. The type specimen was collected on the limestone rocks of Mount Soffeh near Isfahan in Iran. It was later transferred to the genus Acarospora by Auguste-Marie Hue in 1909. A vernacular name used in North America is "hoary cobblestone lichen". It was called "corn pops" in a 2016 American field guide.

== Description ==
The thallus of Acarospora stapfiana is variable in form, ranging from areolate (cracked into small pieces) to subsquamulose (somewhat scaly), and often appears as a contiguous structure. It has a distinctive greenish-yellow to yellow upper surface, which can turn greyish when pruinose (covered with a powdery layer). The areoles (small rounded lobes) are typically 0.3 to 1.7 mm wide and up to 900 μm high. the lichen's cortex, the outermost protective layer, is 45–70 μm thick and composed of a tightly packed cellular structure. beneath the cortex, the algal layer is evenly distributed, with cells that are 5–15 μm in diameter, while the white medulla, or inner tissue, can be as thick as 380 μm.

The apothecia (fruiting bodies) usually appear as 1 to 3 small openings per areole, with radial cracks forming around them. initially, they are punctiform (dot-like) but later become immersed in the thallus, developing reddish-brown rough discs. Each apothecium has a parathecium (outer layer) that is 8–30 μm wide. The hymenium, where the spores are produced, is 90–110 μm tall, with an epihymenium (upper layer of the hymenium) that is reddish-brown and 15–25 μm high. The asci, the spore-bearing sacs, are clavate (club-shaped) and contain over 100 ascospores each, which are roughly spherical to broadly ellipsoid, measuring 3–5 by 3–4 μm. The lichen produces rhizocarpic acid as a secondary metabolite, which can be detected through chemical analysis. The presence of this compound causes the lichen thallus to fluoresce an orangish colour when lit with long wavelength ultraviolet light.

== Habitat and distribution ==
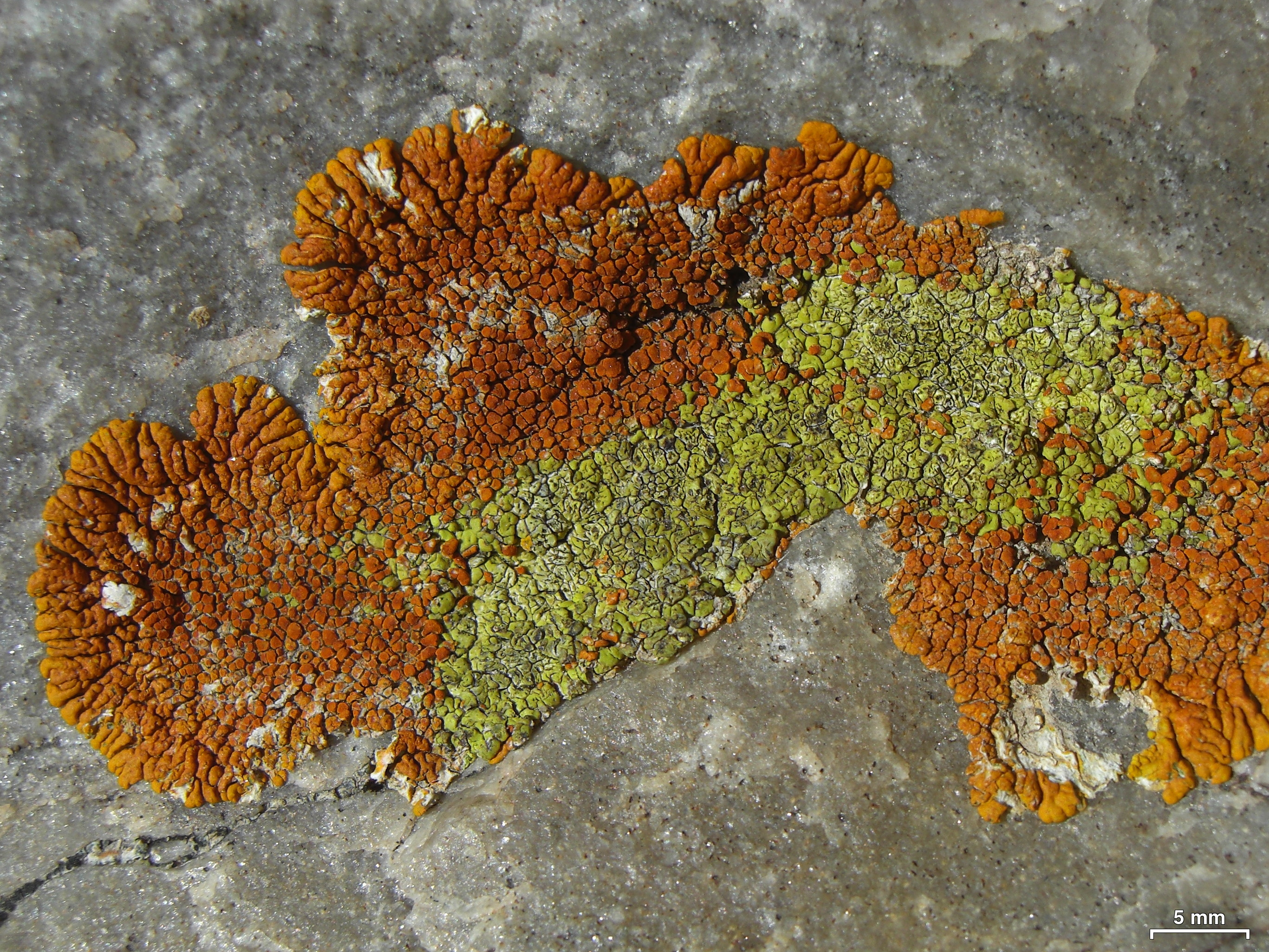
Acarospora stapfiana growing on Golubkovia trachyphylla

Acarospora stapfiana typically grows on calcareous (limestone) rocks, but is also found on sandstone, granitic, and volcanic rocks. It is parasitic on species of the genus Caloplaca (in the broad sense; the genus Caloplaca has been split into many smaller genera), particularly saxicolous (rock-dwelling) species. It has been recorded in various regions of Asia, including China, and in parts of North America. In China, it has been found at elevations ranging from about 1,500 to 4,300 m (4,900 to 14,100 ft), with collections from regions like Xinjiang. Its parasitic nature allows it to exploit the algal photobionts of its host, leading to the destruction of the host's orange thallus as it develops its own yellow one.

As a lichenicolous lichen, Acarospora stapfiana is an obligate parasite, meaning it requires a host for its survival. It starts life as a non-lichenised fungus within its Caloplaca host, eventually stealing the host's algal symbionts to support its own photosynthesis. Over time, it consumes the host's tissues, replacing the distinctive orange thallus of Caloplaca with its own yellow lichenised form.
