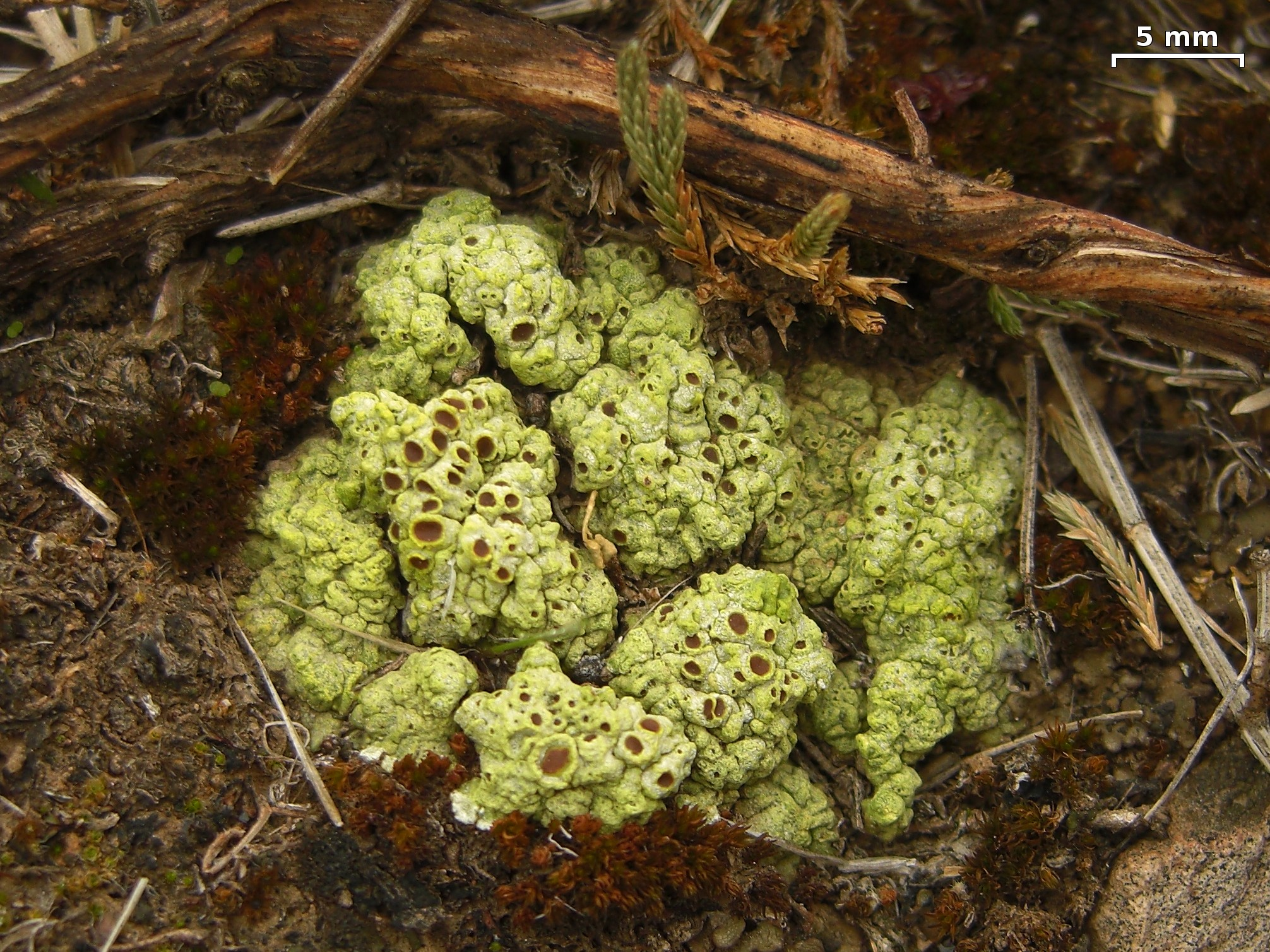

Scientific classification
- Domain: Eukaryota
- Kingdom: Fungi
- Division: Ascomycota
- Class: Lecanoromycetes
- Order: Acarosporales
- Family: Acarosporaceae
- Genus: Acarospora
- Species: A. schleicheri

Binomial name
- Acarospora schleicheri (Ach.) A.Massal. (1852)

Synonyms
- Urceolaria schleicheri Ach. (1810); Parmelia schleicheri (Ach.) Fr. (1831); Lecanora schleicheri (Ach.) Nyl. (1855); Placodium schleicheri (Ach.) Boistel (1903); Aspicilia schleicheri (Ach.) Pit. & Harm. (1911)

= Acarospora schleicheri =

Species of fungus

Acarospora schleicheri, the soil paint lichen, is a bleached to bright yellow areolate to squamulose lichen that commonly grows to 10 cm (4 in) on soil (terricolous) in arid habitats of southern California and Baja California, also in Europe and Africa. It produces rhizocarpic acid as a secondary metabolite, which gives it a yellow coloration and serves to protect it from the sun. Its lower surface is also yellow. It can be greenish when moist. Roundish, angular, or irregularly shaped squamules are 0.5–4 mm in diameter. There are 0–1 (sometimes 2–3) apothecia embedded in the thallus, with 0.4–1.2 mm roundish black to reddish-brown, or dark brown discs, which sometimes fill the areola so as to be lecanorine. It divides vegetatively on the soil. Asci are club shaped (clavate) and have 100 or more spherical to ellipsoid spores. Lichen spot tests are negative, and it is UV+ orange under ultraviolet light.
