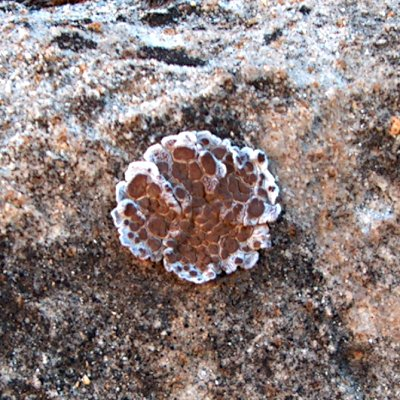
- Glypholecia scabra

Scientific classification
- Domain: Eukaryota
- Kingdom: Fungi
- Division: Ascomycota
- Class: Lecanoromycetes
- Order: Acarosporales
- Family: Acarosporaceae
- Genus: Glypholecia; Nyl.

= Glypholecia =

Genus of fungi

Glypholecia is a genus of lichenized fungi in the family Acarosporaceae.
