= Neoacrodontiella =

Scientific classification
- Kingdom: Fungi
- Division: Ascomycota
- Class: Lecanoromycetes
- Order: Acarosporales
- Family: Acarosporaceae
- Genus: Neoacrodontiella; Crous & M.J.Wingf. (2019)
- Species: N. eucalypti

Binomial name
- Neoacrodontiella eucalypti Crous & M.J.Wingf. (2019)

Species of lichen

Neoacrodontiella is a single-species fungal genus in the family Acarosporaceae. It contains the leaf-dwelling species Neoacrodontiella eucalypti. The type specimen was collected in Malaysia, on the leaves of Eucalyptus urophylla. The generic name Neoacrodontiella alludes to its morphological similarity with genus Acrodontiella, while the species epithet refers to the growth on eucalyptus.
