= Janae =

Janae or janae may refer to:

== People ==
- Janae Bakken
- Janae Jefferson
- Janae Marie Kroc
- Janae Timmins

== Science ==
- Acarospora janae
- Dolichupis janae
- Pareuxoa janae
- Squalius janae
