= Kerry Knudsen =

American lichenologist

Kerry Knudsen is an American mycological taxonomist and lichenlogist at the Czech University of Life Sciences, Prague.

== Personal life and education ==
Kerry Kent Knudsen was born in Alhambra, California, USA in 1950. He took a degree at Cypress College, Cypress, CA, USA and worked in the construction industry until disability forced him to retire at the end of the 1990s. He is married to the lichenologist Jana Kocourkova of Czech University of Life Sciences Prague.

== Career ==
He began to study lichen in the early 2000s and joined the Sonoran Flora Project, so beginning to work on the Acarosporales. He also began a herbarium of Southern Californian lichens and from 2003 was the unpaid lichen curator in the department of botany and plant sciences at University of California, Riverside. He developed the university's collection from 200 to 17,000 lichen specimens. He has been employed as a mycological researcher by the Czech University of Life Sciences Prague since 2015.

He specialises in the order Acarosporales, which have a world-wide distribution and also focused on lichen biodiversity of southern California. This has provided some base-line data on lichen distributions and also, through comparison with older records, has identified changes in biodiversity as well as several new species of lichen. He also works on lichen distributions involving both field work and computer modelling. This includes development of ideas about the photobiont within lichen-forming fungi, in that the fungus may form a mutualistic association with different photobionts depending on environmental conditions, especially temperature.

== Publications ==
Knudsen is the author or co-author of over 200 scientific publications. They include:

- Kerry Knudsen; Jessica Cho-Ah-Ying; Jana Kocourková; Eva Hodková; Jiří Malíček; Yan Wang (2025) The diversity of Acarosporaceae (Acarosporales, Lecanoromycetes) in California. Mycokeys '112 183-210.
- Helmut Mayrhofer; Karin Plattner; Othmar Breuss; Kerry Knudsen; Mohammad Sohrabi; M. Daud Rafiqpoor; Siegmar W. Breckle (2023) The lichenized and lichenicolous fungi of Afghanistan. Plant and Fungal Systematics 68 (2) 440-461.
- Rolshausen, G.; Hallman, U.; Grande, F.D.; Otte, J.; Knudsen, K.; Schmitt, I. (2020) Expanding the mutualistic niche: Parallel symbiont turnover along climatic gradients. Proceedings of the Royal Society B: Biological Sciences 287 20192311
- Zamora, J.C.; Svensson, M.; Kirschner, R.; Olariaga, I.; Ryman, S.; Parra, L.A.; Geml, J.; Rosling, A.; Adamčík, S.; Ahti, T. et al. including K. Knudsen (2018) Considerations and consequences of allowing DNA sequence data as types of fungal taxa. IMA Fungus 9 167–175.
- Knudsen, Kerry; Kocourková, Jana; Nordin, Anders (2014) Conspicuous similarity hides diversity in the Acarospora badiofusca group (Acarosporaceae). The Bryologist 117 (4) 319-328.
- Lumbsch, H.T.; Ahti, T.; Altermann, S.; de Paz, G.A.; Aptroot, A.; Arup, U.; Peña, A.B.; Bawingan, P.A.; Benatti, M.N.; Betancourt, L. et al. including K. Knudsen (2011) One hundred new species of lichenized fungi: a signature of undiscovered global diversity 18 1-127.
- Kerry Knudsen; David L. Magney (2006) Rare lichen habitats and rare lichen species of Ventura County, California. Opuscula philolichenum 3 49-52.

He has described over 60 new species of lichen and there are 4 species named after him.
