= Squamulose lichen =

Lichen composed of small, often overlapping "scales"

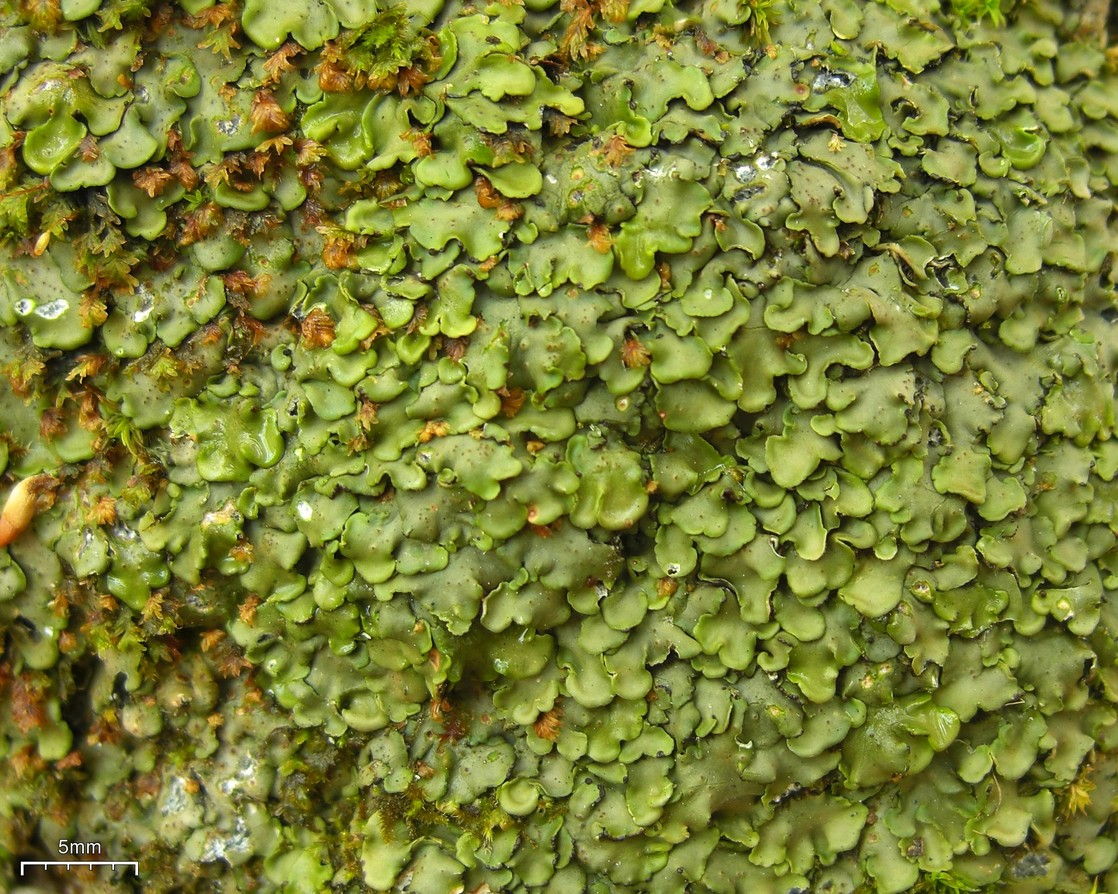
Placidium arboreum is a squamulose lichen with squamules that become green when wet.

A squamulose lichen is a lichen that is composed of small, often overlapping "scales" called squamules. If they are raised from the substrate and appear leafy, the lichen may appear to be a foliose lichen, but the underside does not have a "skin" (cortex), as foliose lichens do. Squamulose lichens are composed of flattish units that are usually tightly clustered. They are like an intermediate between crustose and foliose lichens.

Examples of squamulose lichens include Vahliella leucophaea, Cladonia subcervicornis and Lichenomphalia hudsoniana.
