= Crustose lichen =

Growth form of lichen as a continuously adherent crust

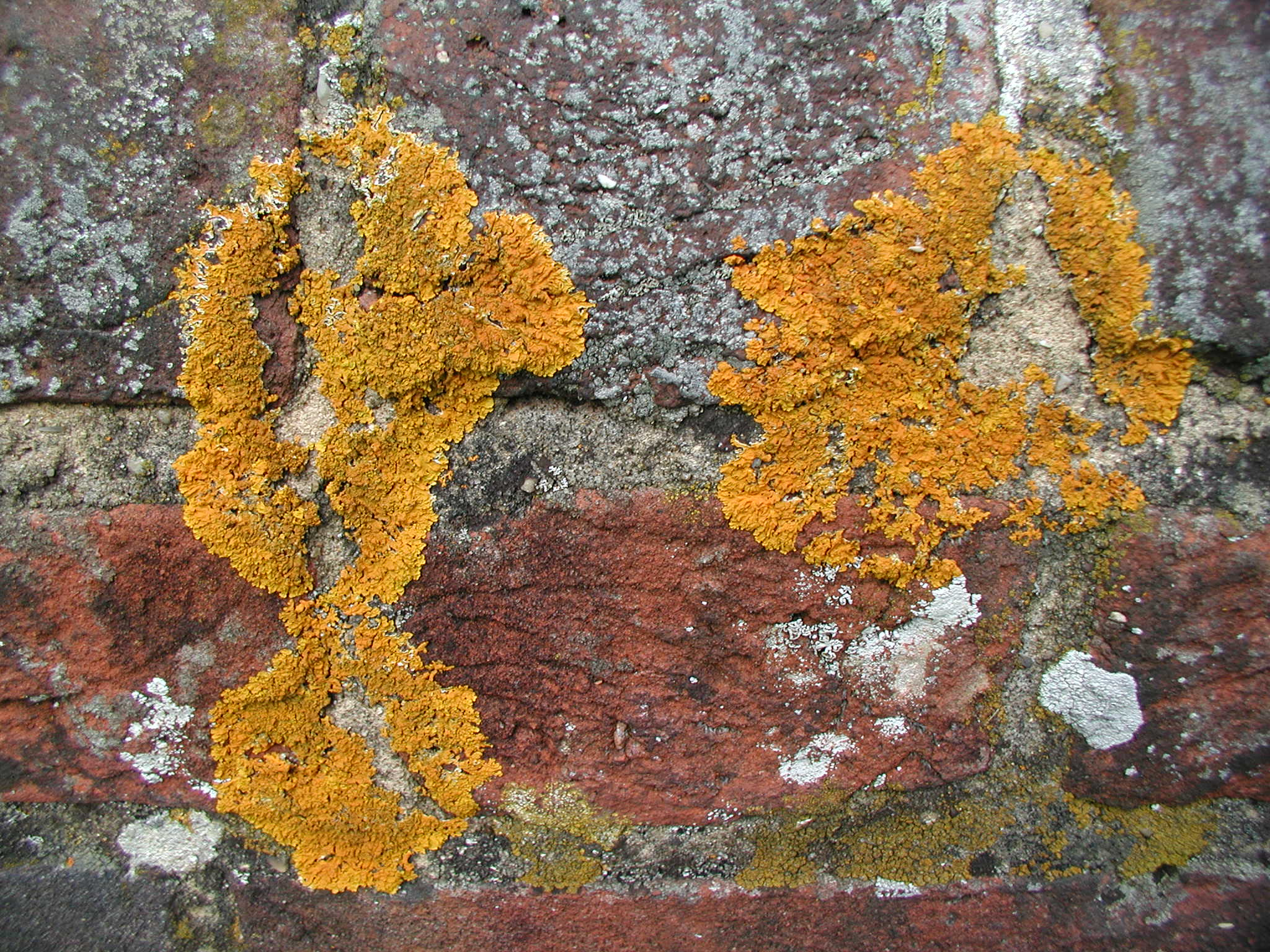
Crustose lichens on a wall

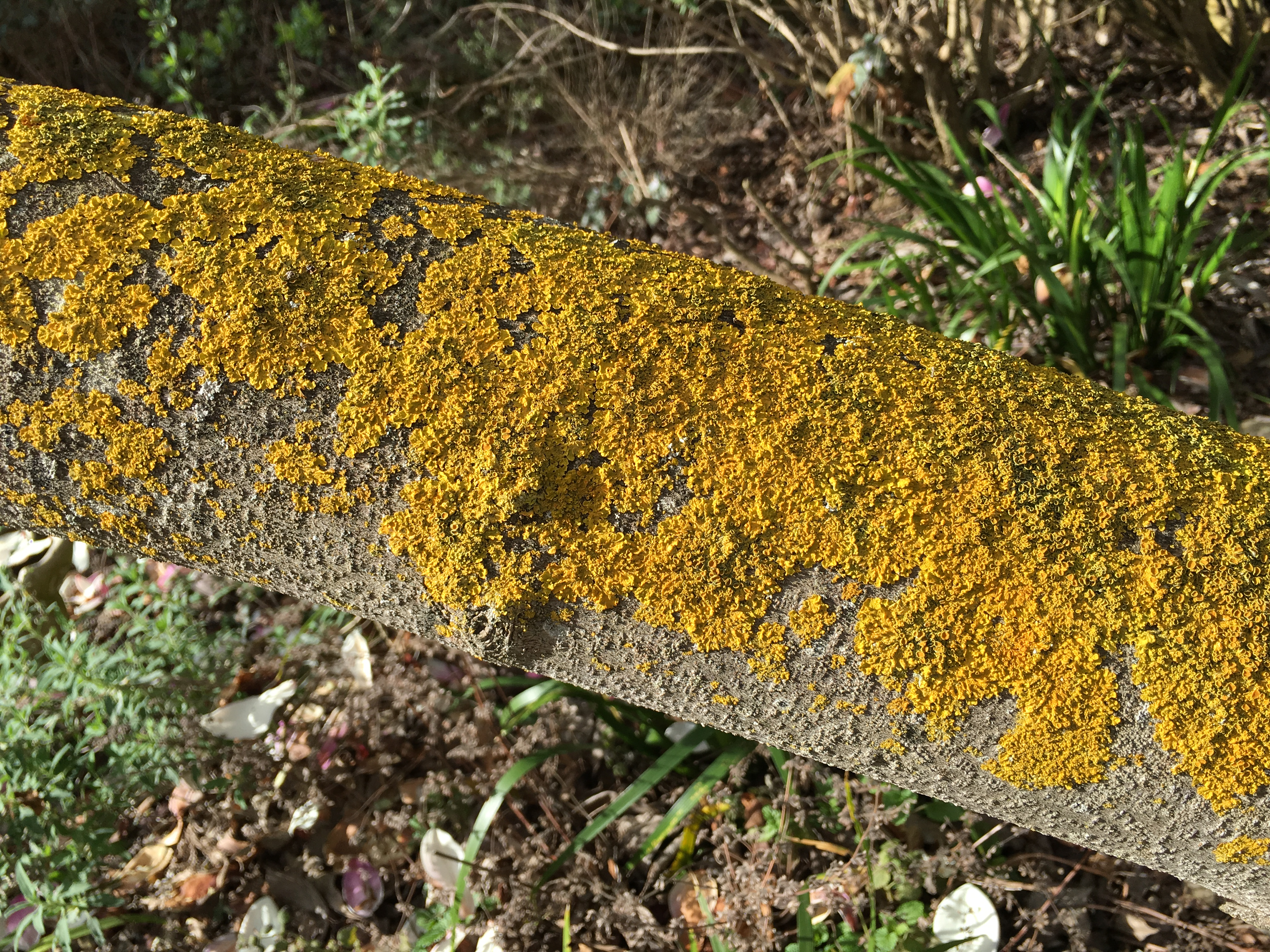
Growth of crustose lichen on a tree trunk

Crustose lichens are lichens that form a crust which strongly adheres to the substrate (soil, rock, tree bark, etc.), making separation from the substrate impossible without destruction. The basic structure of crustose lichens consists of a cortex layer, an algal layer, and a medulla. The upper cortex layer is differentiated and is usually pigmented. The algal layer lies beneath the cortex. The medulla fastens the lichen to the substrate and is made up of fungal hyphae. The surface of crustose lichens is characterized by branching cracks that periodically close in response to climatic variations such as alternate wetting and drying regimes.

== Subtypes ==
- Powdery – considered as the simplest subtype due to the absence of an organized thallus.

The thallus appears powdery.
E.g. Genera Lepraria, Vezdaea

- Endolithic – grows inside the rock, usually in interstitial spaces between mineral grains. The

upper cortex is usually developed.
E.g. Genus Lecidea

- Epilithic – grows on top of the rock without penetrating the rock substrate.

E.g. Acarospora fuscata

- Epiphloeodal – grows only on the surface of plants.

E.g. Lecania naegelii

- Endophloeodic – grows underneath the cuticle of leaves or stems.

E.g. Amandinea punctata

- Squamulose – has a scale-like appearance resulting from partial separation from substrate.

It is an intermediate form between crustose and foliose.
E.g. Genus Psora, Catapyrenium, Coriscium

- Peltate – similar to squamulose, but thallus remains attached near the central area.

E.g. Peltula euploca

- Bullate – has an extremely inflated appearance.

E.g. Genus Mobergia

- Effigurate - has radially arranged marginal lobes that are prolonged.

E.g. Genera Acarospora, Pleopsidium

- Lobate – characterized by a thallus that radially arranged with lobes that are partially raised.

E.g. Genera Caloplaca, Lecanora

- Suffruticose – clusters of coralloid cushions.

E.g. Peltula clavata

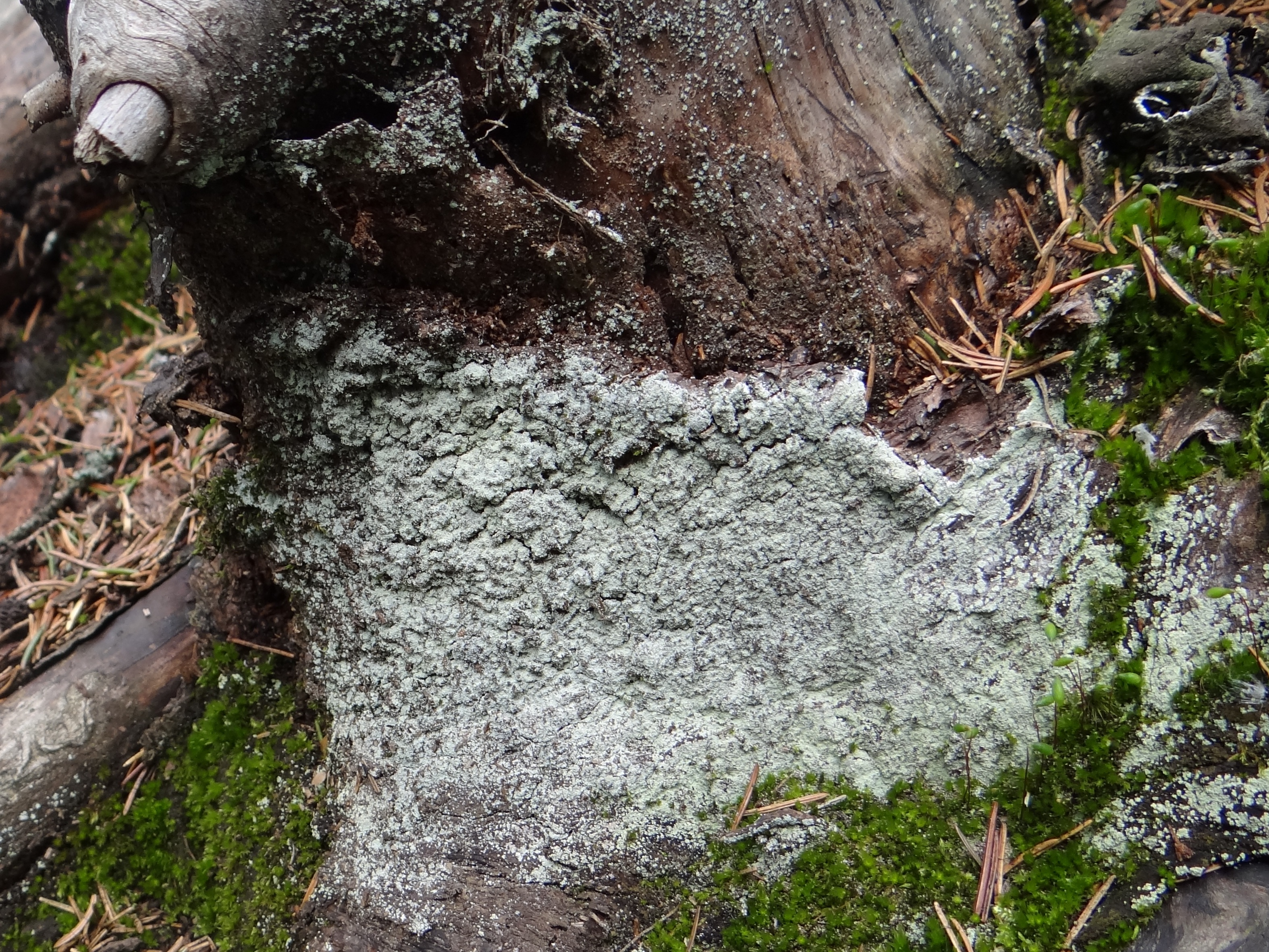
Lepraria incana, a powdery lichen

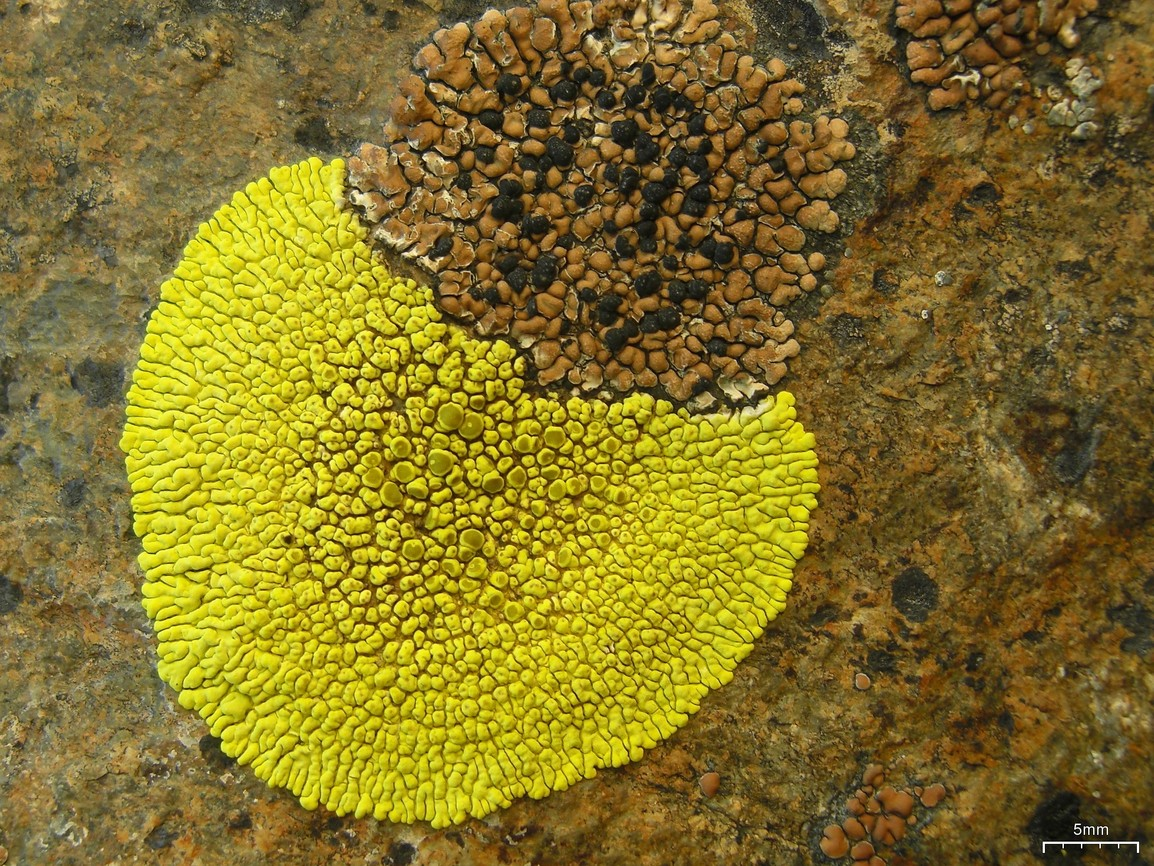
Lecidea atrobrunnea, an endolithic lichen

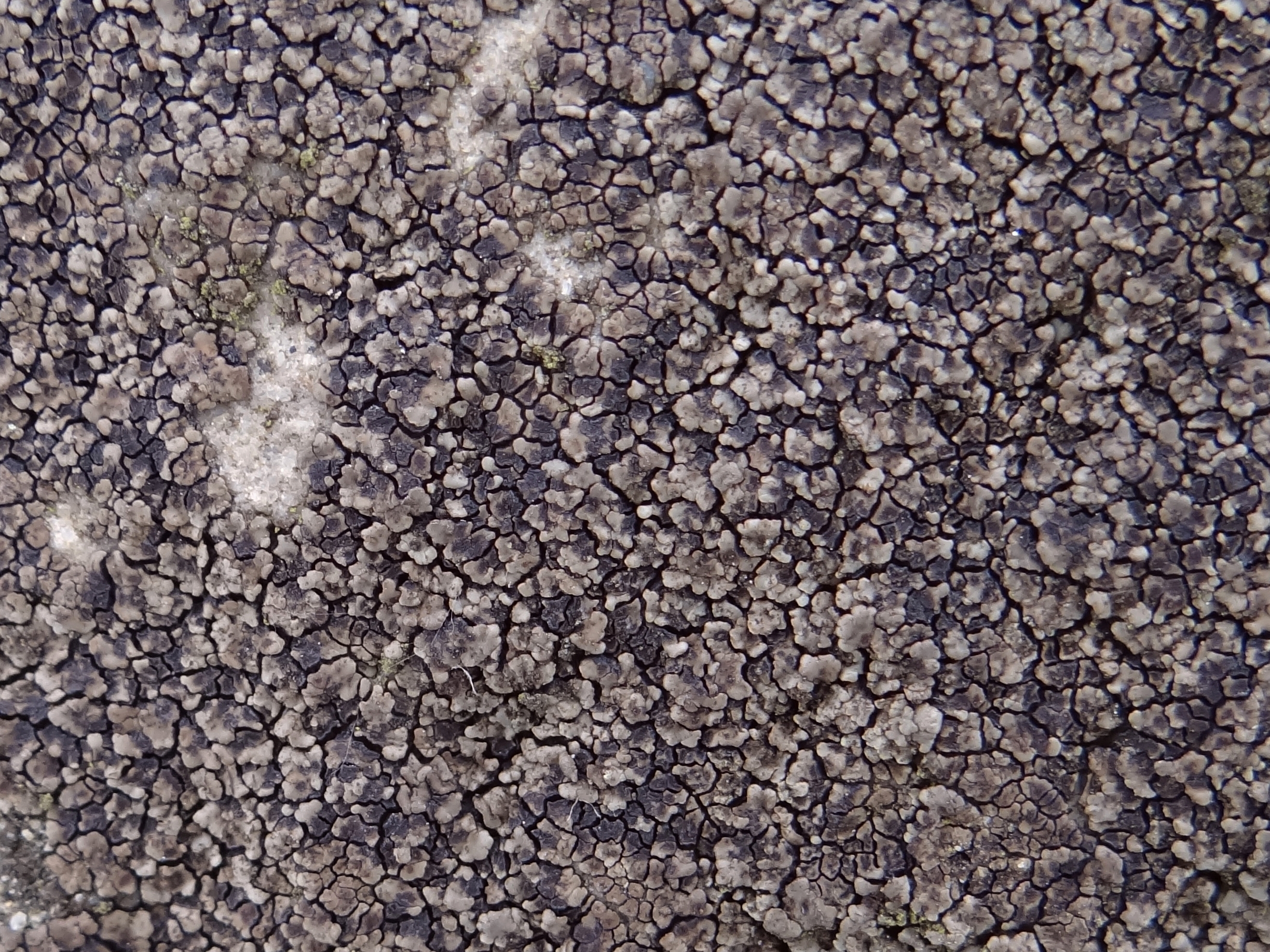
Acarospora fuscata, an epilithic lichen

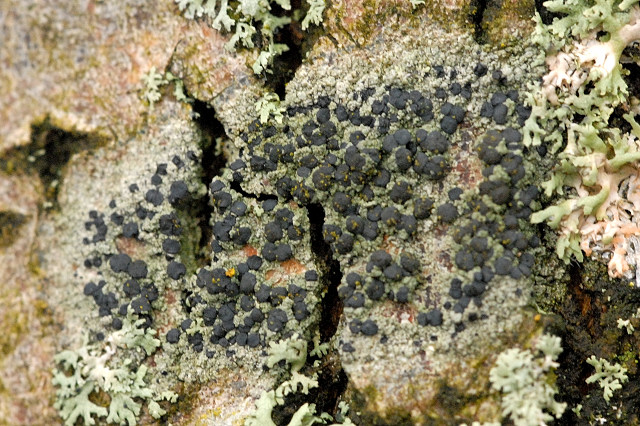
Amandinea punctata, an endophloedic lichen

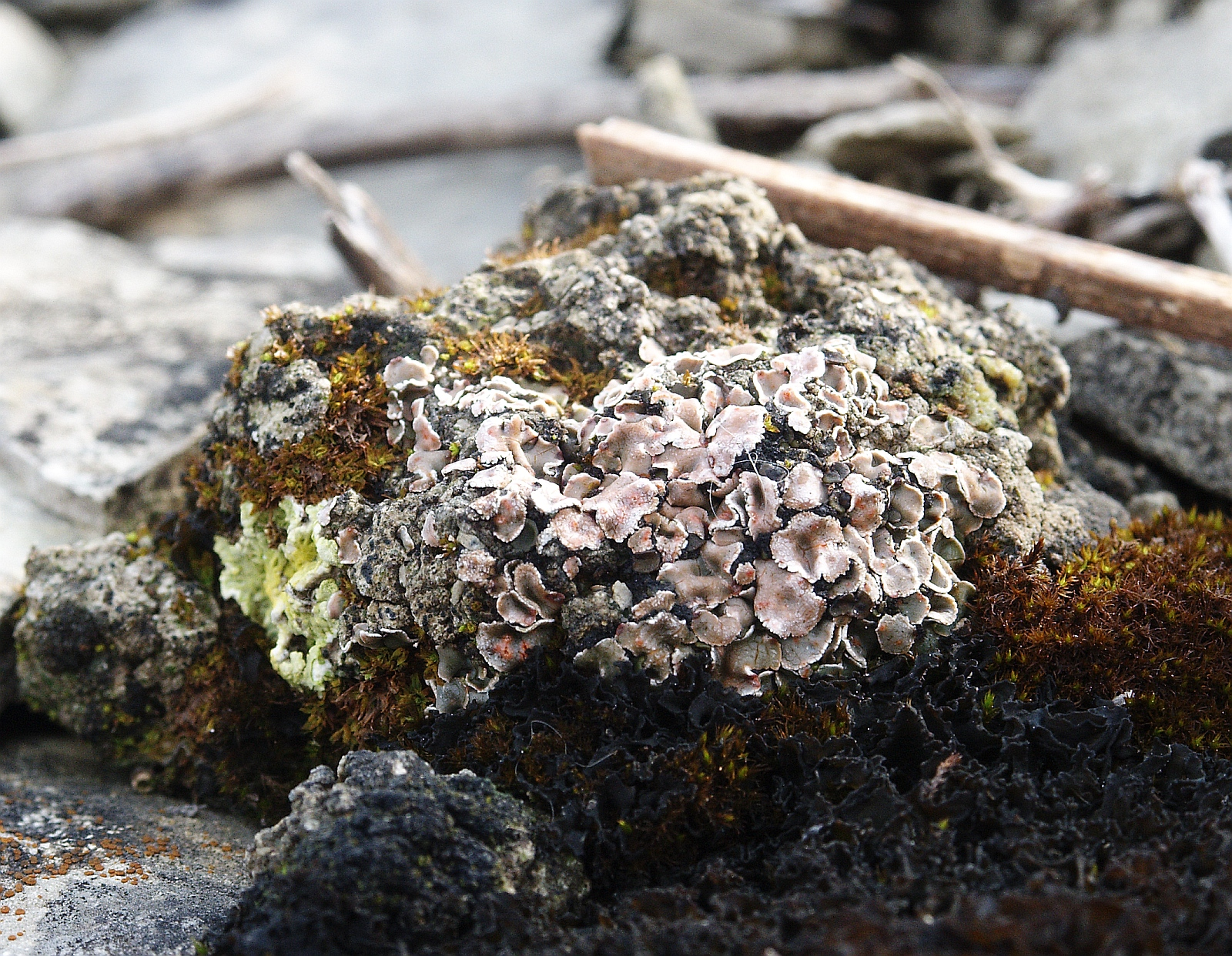
Psora decipiens, a squamulose lichen

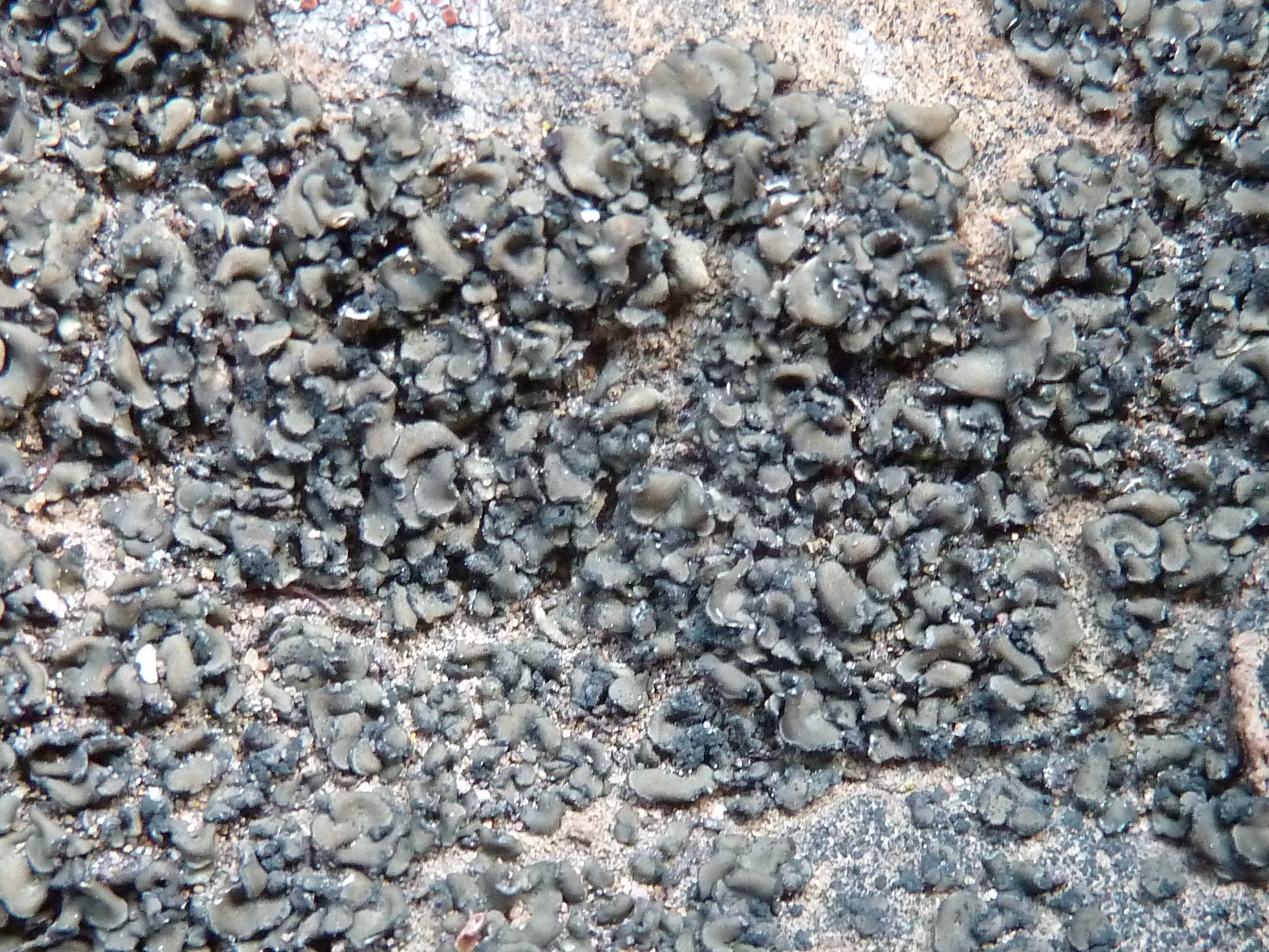
Peltula euploca, a peltate lichen

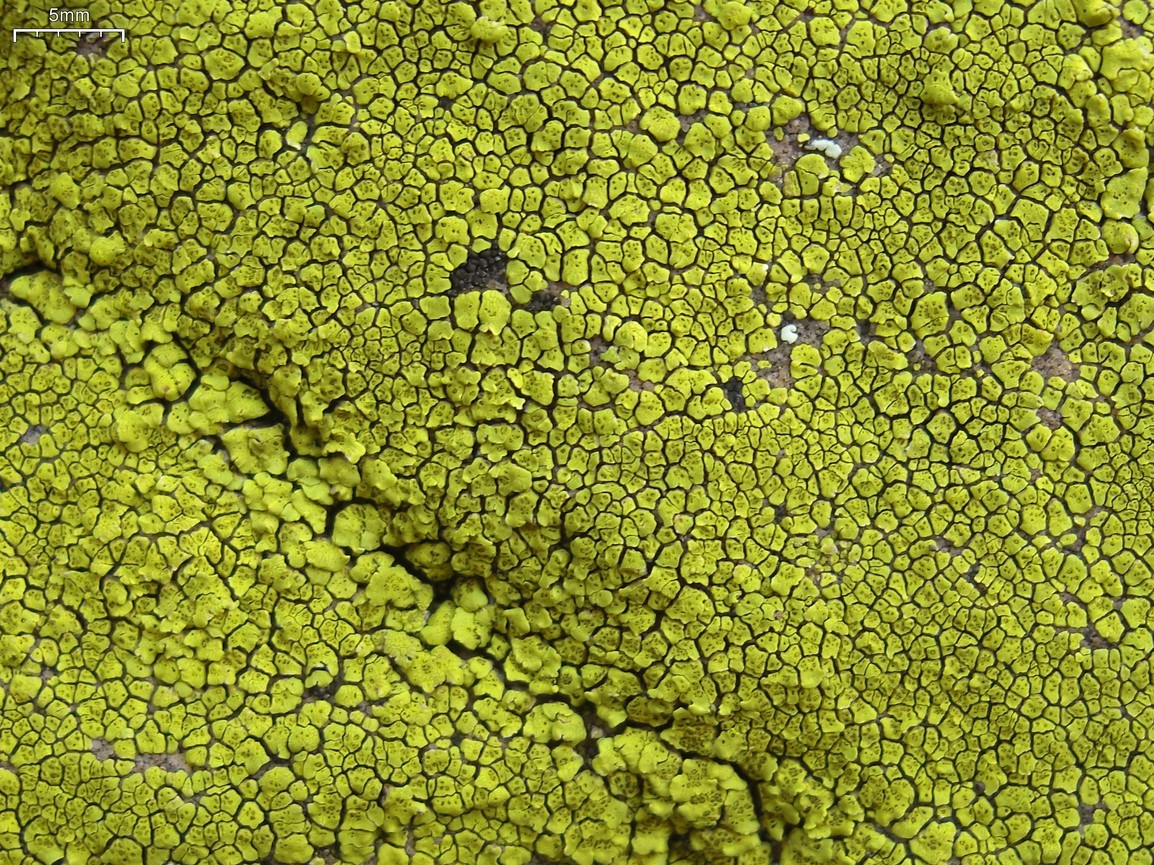
Acarospora socialis, an effigurate lichen

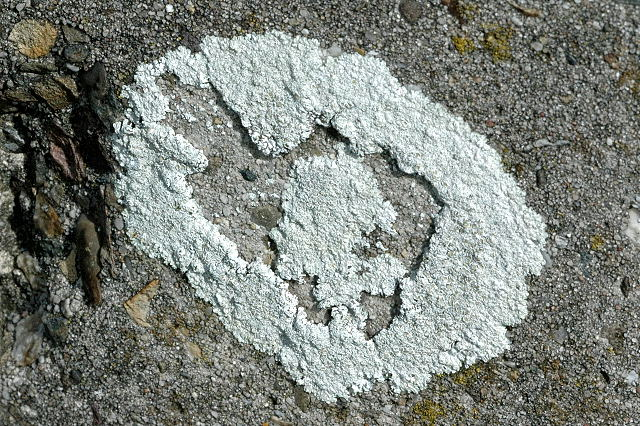
Lecanora dispersa, a lobate lichen

== Structure ==
Crustose lichen forms a thin crust adhering closely to the substratum. In some cases, this crust may be thick and lumpy, and may be detached, in part, or submerged below its surface. The thallus of a crustose lichen is usually only discernible because of the discolouration of the substrate. Some crustose lichens have thalli consisting of scattered or loosely grouped granules. Crustose lichens differ from the leprose lichen by having an upper cortex and algal cells that are located directly beneath the cortex. The thallus of a crustose lichen has a patchwork or crazy-paving appearance. The patches, or areolae, can be as large as 1 cm in diameter or very small and raised, giving them the appearance of a wart. The surface of the thallus is generally smooth, however it is sometimes broken up by "rimose" cracks. These cracks are a by-product of thallus surface shrinkage, which is caused by alternate wetting and drying. An underlayer of fungal hyphae, the hypothallus, is present on some species of crustose lichens. A dark rim on the areolae may form in areas where the hypothallus is exposed. This may also be present on the thallus itself. These fungal hyphae are usually what attach the thallus firmly to the substrate.

== Growth ==
In general, lichens do not grow very quickly. Annual growth rates vary among different growth forms. Crustose lichens have the lowest rates of growth.

The diameter and area of the thallus exponentially increase, provided that organic substances are distributed uniformly in all parts of the lichens. However, as the thallus increases in size, the circumference also increases, which corresponds to a larger increase in volume. As a result, movement and uniform distribution of organic substances become more difficult.

=== Growth factors ===
The growth of crustose lichens is dependent on several factors, including moisture levels, sunlight, and temperature. High rates of precipitation and high moisture levels promote the growth of crustose lichens. Crustose lichens are more prevalent in areas with higher precipitation. A similar trend is observed when aridity is taken into account. Crustose lichens prefer sites of lower aridity.

==== Sunlight ====
The amount of sunlight that lichens receive determines the rate at which photosynthesis occurs. Moreover, surface area also influences photosynthetic rates. In high sunlight conditions, foliose lichens with broad lobes are prevalent. In comparison, crustose lichens have less surface area than foliose lichens and will tend to have slower photosynthetic rates. Generally, higher levels of sunlight promote growth of the crustose lichens.

==== Temperature ====
Extreme temperatures are unfavorable for the growth of crustose lichens. Temperatures below 0 °C (32 °F) can result in cessation of growth and thalli freezing. Annual growth rates for the Rhizocarpon subgenus show a correlation with annual and winter mean temperatures, but not with mean summer temperatures.

Unfortunately, little faith can be put in these correlations because they use unvalidated measures of unknown accuracy and precision and measurement of growth was done along a single diameter. Since thallus growth along any radius might not match growth along any other radius it is unclear if these correlations are meaningful. Various publications can be consulted to see that there is tremendous within thallus variation in lateral growth (e.g.,).

The scientific basis of lichenometric dating and the reliability of lichen growth rate measurements in general have been questioned and critically reviewed in a paper by Osborn et al. (2015). Those criticisms of lichenometric dating have yet to be answered.

== Photosynthesis ==
Photosynthetic rates vary among lichen growth forms due to differences and variations in thalli thicknesses. Irregular thicknesses in crustose lichens result in greater variation in photosynthetic rates relative to more uniformly thick forms such as foliose lichens.

== Distribution and habitat ==
Crustose lichens can be found in a wide range of areas. They can be found, among others, together with epiphytic algae and liverworts, living on the surfaces of leaves of tropical evergreen trees and shrubs. They also thrive in carbonate-rich karst areas. In southern China, it has been estimated that 5–30% of rock outcrops in bare karst areas and 30–70% in forest karst areas are covered with crustose lichens. Crustose lichens also flourish in extreme environments. Various species of crustose lichens, including Biatora granulosa and Lecidea uliginosa, were found covering recently-burned surfaces caused by a subarctic forest fire in an area near the Great Slave Lake. Crustose lichens also grow in areas of high elevations, such as the western Himalayan region. Concentrations of terricolous crustose lichens were highest in areas of higher elevation, relative to other foliose and fruticose lichens. In areas of high pollution, the majority of lichens are killed and are the first plants to disappear in cities due to their high sensitivity to atmospheric pollutants. Nonetheless, surrounding the central area of cities in which most plants cannot thrive, crustose lichens Physcia or Xanthoria have been found growing, although they do fall short of natural development and size. The crustose lichen Lecanora conizaeoides is another highly resilient species, and remarkably seems to only grow in industrial areas of the United Kingdom.

== Significance ==
Saxicolous crustose lichens play an important role in the weathering of rocks. Repeated contraction and expansion of thalli occurs in response to alternate periods of wetting and drying, resulting in the breakdown of rock fragments and removal of mineral grains from the rock surfaces. Crustose lichens also chemically weather rocks through hydrolysis. In a study conducted by Kitagawa and Watanabe (2004), the crustose genus Porpidia altered minerals, specifically biotite in granite. Furthermore, vermiculite-like minerals were formed as a result of biotite alteration through hydrolysis. Crustose lichens living in karst areas have substantial influence on carbon dioxide flux at the boundary between the lithosphere and atmosphere because they increase the rates of corrosion of carbonate rocks in these areas. Some species of crustose lichens exhibit antibiotic properties. Lepraria chlorina contains substantial amounts of vulpinic acid, which is a chemical that has anti-inflammatory properties. Crustose lichens may also be used for dating rock surfaces, through a technique called lichenometry. As soon as a rock is exposed to the Earth’s atmosphere, spores of various organisms are driven into the crevices on the surface. The majority of these spores die under the extreme conditions of a rock surface, an area where water evaporates rapidly and daily fluxes in temperatures are quite large. The spores of some crustose lichens, however, can develop on these surfaces. Eventually the crustose spores form small and round thalli and increase in diameter yearly. When lichens are used for dating a rock surface, only the diameters of the largest thalli of one species are measured, as there is an assumption that only they began development when the surface was initially exposed. The age of exposure of a rock surface is then extrapolated from records.
