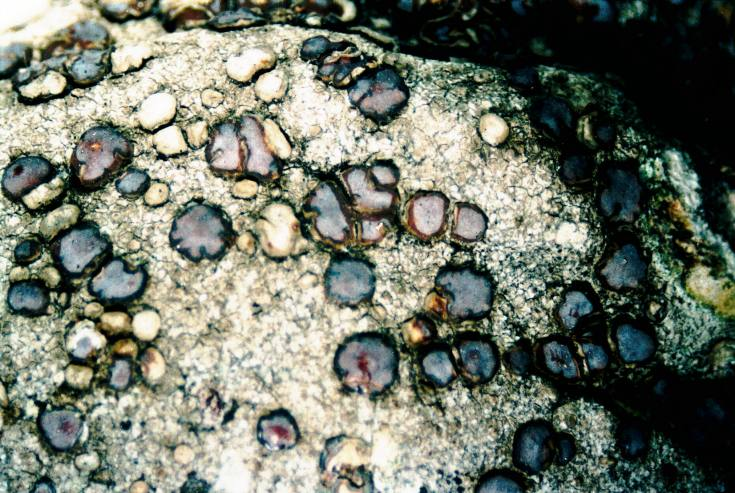
- Sarcogyne regularis

Scientific classification
- Kingdom: Fungi
- Division: Ascomycota
- Class: Lecanoromycetes
- Order: Acarosporales
- Family: Acarosporaceae; Zahlbr. (1906)

Type genus
- Acarospora A.Massal. (1852)

Genera
- See text

= Acarosporaceae =

Family of fungi

The Acarosporaceae are a family of fungi in the order Acarosporales. Members of this family have a widespread distribution, and are mostly lichenized with green algae. According to a 2021 estimate, the family contains 11 genera and about 260 species. The family is characterised by a hamathecium formed of paraphysoids (hyphal structures similar in function to true paraphyses, but often branched and forming a network).

== Phylogeny ==
Formerly classified in the fungal order Lecanorales, phylogenetic analyses in 1998 suggested that the Acarosporaceae belong outside this order; further analysis supported this conclusion. The Acarosporaceae is the sister lineage to all other families in the division Lecanoromycetes.

== Description ==
Most members of the Acarosporaceae are lichenised, although a rare few are lichenicolous. The form of the thallus ranges from crustose to squamulose to peltate-somewhat umbilicate. The ascomata are in the form of apothecia, which are usually immersed in the thallus. They are typically lecanorine, although a few are biatorine, and Polysporina and Sarcogyne have lecideine apothecia. The photobiont partner is chlorococcoid (i.e., green algae from the family Chlorococcaceae). Various lichen products have been reported in the family, including depsides, depsidones, and derivatives of pulvinic acid. Most Acarosporaceae species grow on land or on rock.

== Habitat and distribution ==
Acarosporaceae species are found in a broad range of environments, from coastal areas to high mountain regions, although they are particularly abundant in arid and semi-arid habitats. They do not occur in tidal zones where lichens are periodically submerged, nor are they present in the deep shade of dense forests. While the family is absent from tropical ecosystems, its members are frequently encountered in arid regions, including parts of South Africa and the Andes of South America.

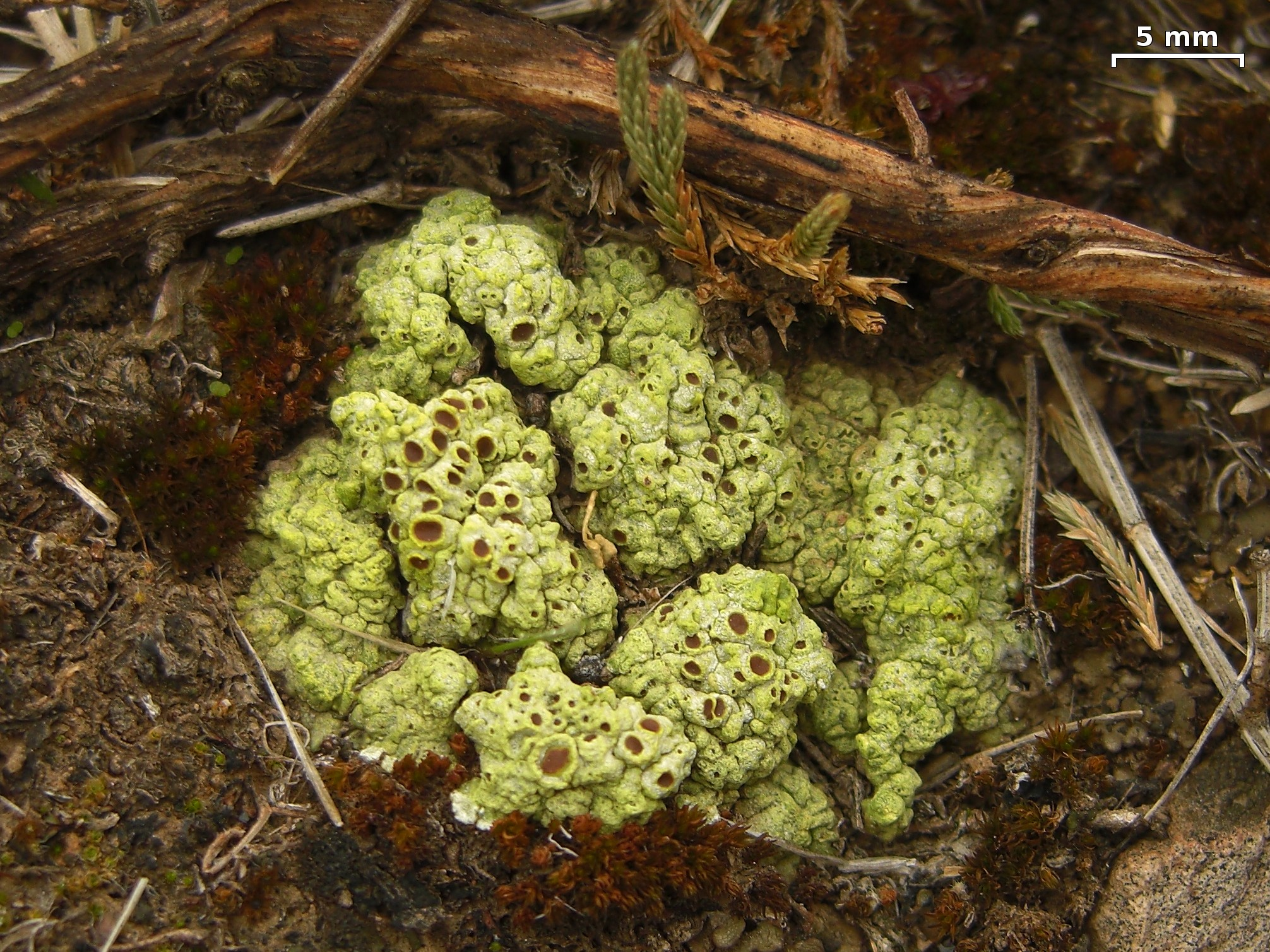
Acarospora schleicheri is a terricolous (ground-dwelling) crustose lichen.

Many species within Acarosporaceae grow on calcareous or non-calcareous rock substrates, with some restricted to basic (HCl−) rock. Certain taxa, such as Acarospora nodulosa and A. schleicheri, are exclusively found in soil crusts. A few species can colonize wood; in Europe, A. similis is considered an obligate wood-dwelling lichen, whereas A. americana is the most frequently recorded on wood in North America. Some saxicolous species exhibit either facultative or obligate lichenicolous growth, beginning as non-lichenized parasites on host lichens and then developing into lichenized forms. One example is A. interjecta, which starts as a parasite on the yellow A. novomexicana before transitioning into a distinctive brown, fully lichenized thallus. A small number of species remain permanently lichenicolous without becoming lichenized, such as A. destructans, common in southern California, and A. lendermeri, which parasitizes Candelariella species in Asia and western North America.

== Ecology ==
Several Acarosporaceae taxa act as pioneer species, readily colonizing newly exposed substrates. They can inhabit man-made surfaces—such as stone walls, gravestones, and concrete—and certain species, like Sarcogyne pruinosa (syn. S. regularis), are particularly common on concrete, while A. moenium is reported from various urban settings. Within the family, no sterile leprose taxa have been described, and only one sorediate species, A. moenium, is recognized; it produces a white thallus with black soralia. Pycnidia, although not present in every species, show considerable diversity in the genus Trimmatothelopsis. Many Acarosporaceae replicate by fragmentation of their thallus and apothecia. Species such as A. applanata (from southwestern North America) and A. fissa (from the Czech Republic) are known for extensive crosshatching by abscission fissures; they seldom produce apothecia and primarily propagate through division.

== Genera ==
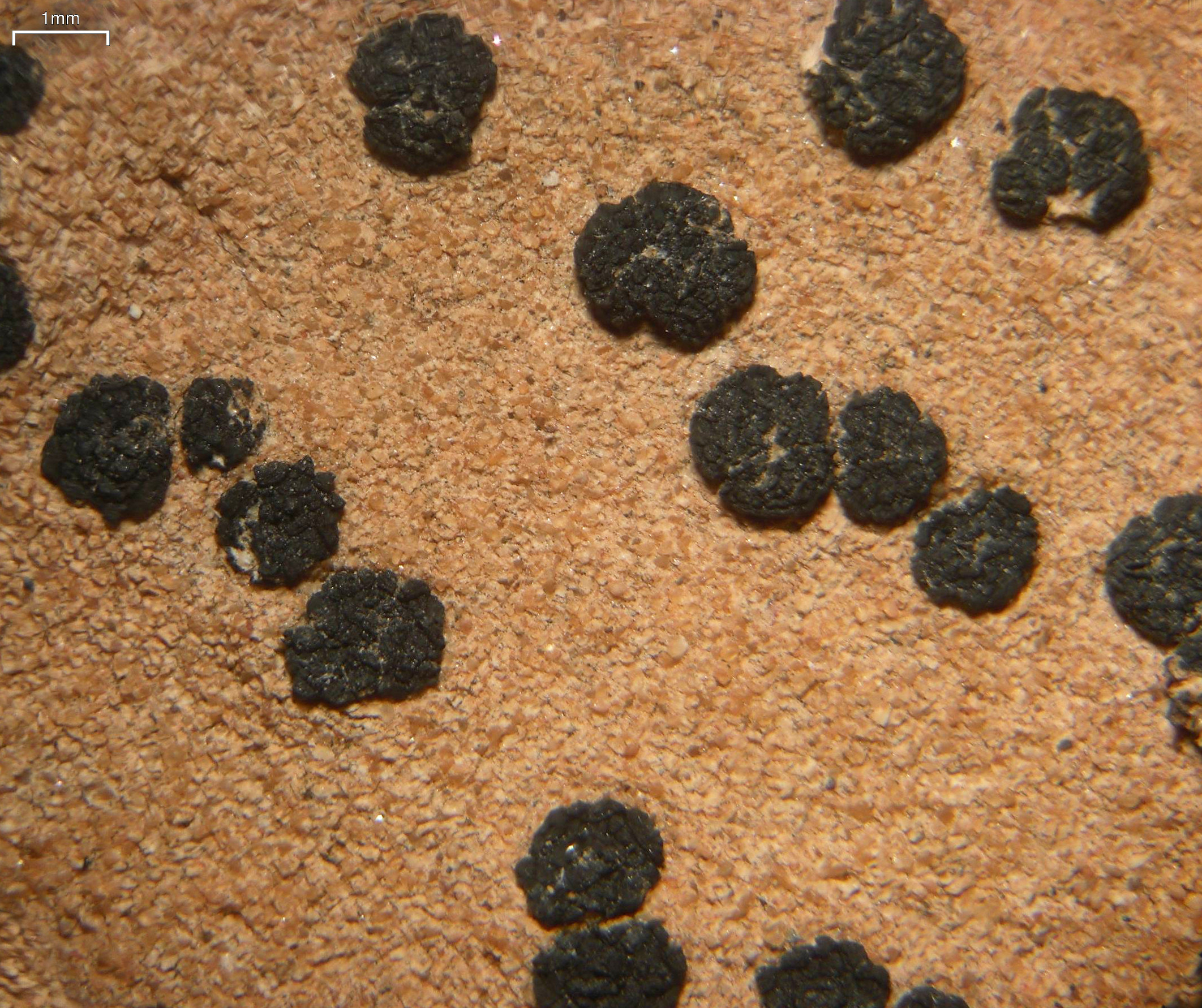
Polysporina cyclocarpa

These are the genera that are in the Acarosporaceae (including estimated number of species in each genus, totalling 261 species), according to a 2021 review of fungal classification. Following the genus name is the taxonomic authority (those who first circumscribed the genus; standardized author abbreviations are used), year of publication, and the estimated number of species.

- Acarospora A.Massal. (1852) – ca. 200 spp.
- Caeruleum K.Knudsen & Arcadia (2012) – 2 spp.
- Glypholecia Nyl. (1853) – 3 spp.
- Lithoglypha Brusse (1988) – 1 sp.
- Myriospora Nägeli ex Uloth (1861) – ca. 10 spp.
- Neoacrodontiella Crous & M.J.Wingf. (2019) – 1 sp.
- Pleopsidium Körb. (1855) – 4 spp.
- Polysporina Vězda (1978) – 10 spp.
- Sarcogyne Flot. (1851) – ca. 30 spp.
- Timdalia Hafellner (2001) – 1 sp.
- Trimmatothelopsis Zschacke (1934) – 11 spp.
