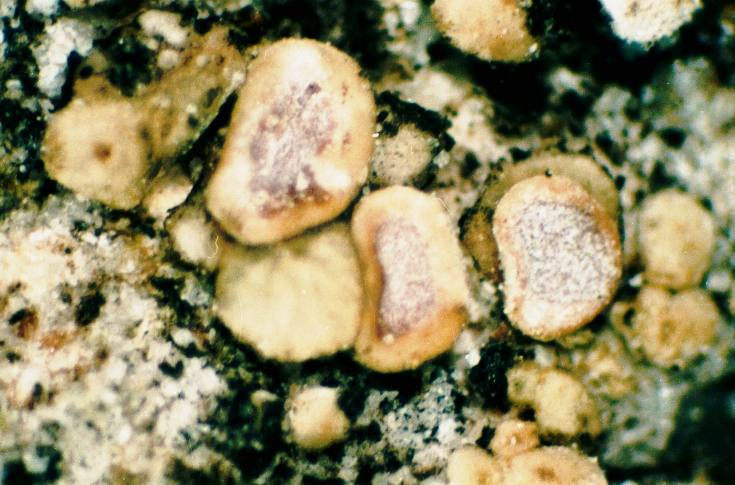
- Acarospora glaucocarpa, member of the Acarosporales

Scientific classification
- Domain: Eukaryota
- Kingdom: Fungi
- Division: Ascomycota
- Class: Lecanoromycetes
- Subclass: Acarosporomycetidae
- Order: Acarosporales; Zahlbr. (1906)

Families
- Acarosporaceae; Eigleraceae

= Acarosporales =

Order of fungi

The Acarosporales are an order of fungi in the class Lecanoromycetes. Phylogenetic analyses conducted using the sequences of both the protein-coding gene RPB2 as well as nuclear ribosomal genes place this order within the subclass Acarosporomycetidae.

According to a recent (2020) survey of fungal classification, the Acarosporales contain two families: Acarosporaceae, with 11 genera and about 260 species, and Eigleraceae, with 1 genus and 2 species.
