= Myriospora dilatata =

Scientific classification
- Kingdom: Fungi
- Division: Ascomycota
- Class: Lecanoromycetes
- Order: Acarosporales
- Family: Acarosporaceae
- Genus: Myriospora
- Species: M. dilatata

Binomial name
- Myriospora dilatata (M.Westb. & Wedin) K.Knudsen & Arcadia (2012)

Synonyms
- Silobia dilatata M.Westb. & Wedin (2010); Trimmatothelopsis dilatata (M.Westb. & Wedin) Cl.Roux & Nav.-Ros. (2011)

Species of lichen

Myriospora dilatata is a species of crustose lichen in the family Acarosporaceae. This lichen typically inhabits metal-rich environments, particularly those with elevated levels of copper and arsenic. First discovered at lake Torneträsk in Sweden, it has since been documented in various locations across Central and Northern Europe, including Germany, Norway, and the Czech Republic.

== Taxonomy ==
Myriospora dilatata was originally described in 2011 as Silobia dilatata, and later transferred to the genus Myriospora in 2012. An additional synonym, under the genus Trimmatothelopsis, was published as Trimmatothelopsis dilatata. The type specimen was collected on silicate rock at the shore of lake Torneträsk in Kiruna Municipality, Sweden.

== Description ==
The thallus of M. dilatata forms a crust of small, tightly packed areoles that range in colour from bright orange to reddish. Its fruiting bodies (apothecia) begin immersed within the areoles but expand to form verruciform, non-punctiform discs rather than the tiny, point-like apothecia seen in many related species. Under the microscope, asci contain eight spores and the thin, unbranched paraphyses are characteristic of the genus. No secondary metabolites are detected by standard spot tests or thin-layer chromatography, which helps distinguish M. dilatata from other metal-tolerant crustose lichens.

== Habitat and distribution ==
Myriospora dilatata is a ferrophilous (iron-loving), heavy-metal-tolerant species typically found in moist microhabitats such as stream margins or abandoned mining sites where substrates are enriched in copper, arsenic and other metals. It has been recorded in Central and Northern Europe: the Czech Republic (Bohemia), Germany, Norway and Sweden. In the Czech Republic, for example, it grows on mica-schist outcrops with high concentrations of copper ores and arsenopyrite at elevations around 1075 m in the Krkonoše Mountains.
