= Stuor Räitavagge =

Valley near Kiruna, Sweden

Coordinates: 68°01′02″N 18°23′39″E

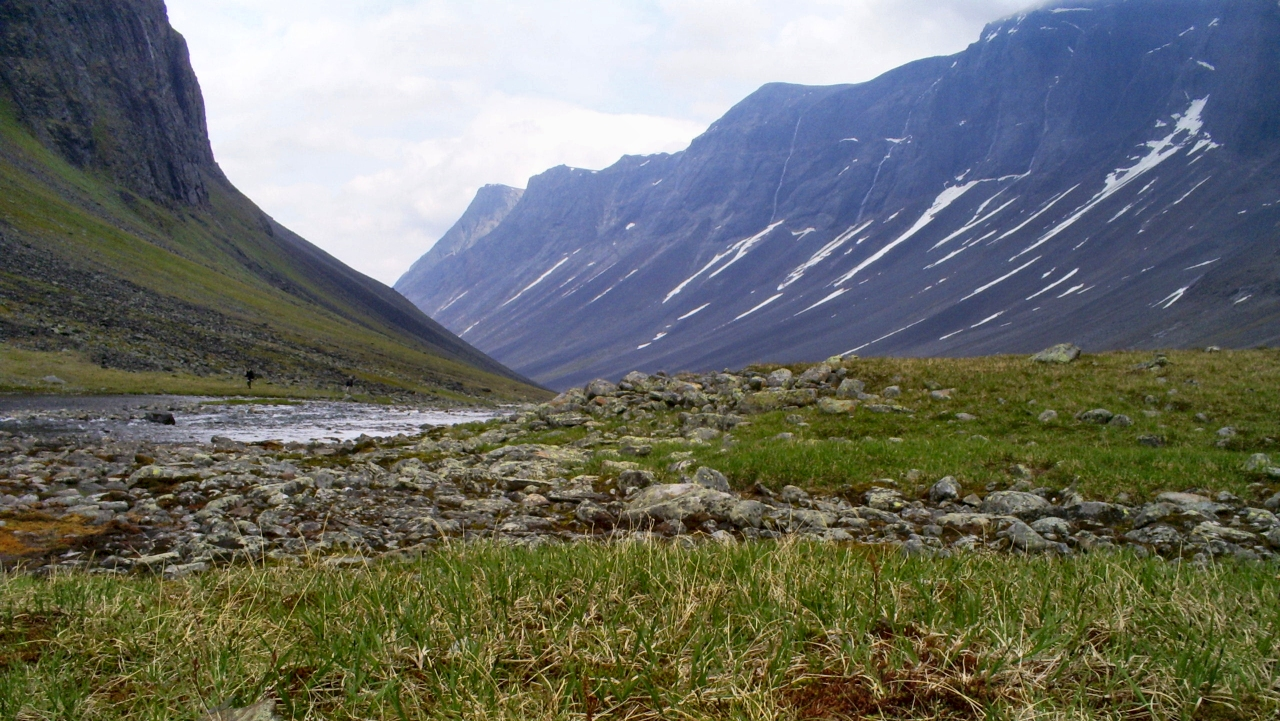
The valley seen from the base of the Nallo mountain.

Stuor Räitavagge (Northern Sami: Stuor Reaiddavággi) is a valley in the Kebnekaise massif, in the Kiruna Municipality. It extends from Vistasvagge in the east to Tjäktjapasset in the west, being relatively wide and easy to travel through. There are no roads or marked pathways in it. In the middle of the valley, the Nallo mountain can be seen. The Swedish Tourist Association has a lodge in the base of the Nallo mountain.
