= Myriospora =

Myriospora may refer to:

- Myriospora (alveolate), a genus of parasitic protozoa belonging to the phylum Apicomplexa
- Myriospora (fungus), a genus of lichenized fungi in the family Acarosporaceae
