= Myriospora himalayensis =

Scientific classification
- Kingdom: Fungi
- Division: Ascomycota
- Class: Lecanoromycetes
- Order: Acarosporales
- Family: Acarosporaceae
- Genus: Myriospora
- Species: M. himalayensis

Binomial name
- Myriospora himalayensis G.K.Mishra, Nayaka & Upreti (2021)

Species of lichen

Myriospora himalayensis is a saxicolous (rock-dwelling), crustose lichen in the family Acarosporaceae, described as new to science from the Western Himalayas of India. It forms a contiguous crust of small, cracked areoles that may become more scattered toward the margins. The species is distinguished by its white, powdery (pruinose) fruiting bodies and unusually small, simple ellipsoid spores.

== Taxonomy ==
The genus Myriospora was long confused with Acarospora until lectotypification and molecular studies restored its distinct status in the early 21st century. Myriospora differs chiefly in having a thallus in which the algal layer is interrupted by bundles of medullary (inner thallus) hyphae, a typically taller hymenium (the spore-bearing tissue), thinner paraphyses (sterile filaments), and the presence of norstictic acid in many species. Within this context, M. himalayensis was recognised as a novel taxon by the Indian lichenologists Gaurav Kumar Mishra, Sanjeeva Nayaka, and Dalip Kumar Upreti in 2021 on the basis of unique combinations of morphological and chemical characters. The species epithet refers to the location of its first documented collections, the Himalayas. The lichen most closely resembles M. myochroa and M. smaragdula but differs in its smaller spores (1.5–2.5 × 1–1.2 μm versus 2.5–5 × 1–1.5 μm) and the presence of a persistent white pruina on the apothecial disc.

== Description ==
Myriospora himalayensis produces a crustose thallus composed of areoles—small, polygonal units separated by planar cracks—that measure 0.3–1.0 mm across and coalesce into an indeterminate crust. The upper surface is smooth to slightly waxy, ranging from whitish-grey to brownish, and lacks an epinecral layer (a dead-cell film). Apothecia (the lichen's spore-bearing structures) occur one to three per areole, are immersed or scarcely emergent, and have a black disc clothed in a fine white pruina—a powdery coating of minute crystals. Under the microscope, the proper exciple (marginal tissue) is hyaline, the hymenium reaches 135–240 micrometres (μm) in height, and paraphyses are simple to branched with clavate (club-shaped) tips. Asci measure 75–112 × 15–23 μm, bearing ellipsoid ascospores 1.5–2.5 × 1–1.2 μm. Conidia (asexual spores) are ellipsoid, about 1 × 0.5 μm, produced in immersed pycnidia. Standard spot tests reveal K+ red (indicating norstictic acid), PD+ yellow, with negative C and KC reactions, and no ultraviolet fluorescence.

== Habitat and distribution ==
As of its original publication, Myriospora himalayensis was known only from temperate rocky outcrops of the Western Himalayas in India—specifically Himachal Pradesh, Jammu and Kashmir and Uttarakhand—at elevations between about 2,325 and 4,500 metres. It grows directly on siliceous rock surfaces, often forming extensive patches in subalpine to alpine zones. Collection localities include Pahalgam (Anantnag district), Great Himalayan National Park (Kullu district), Patnitop (Udhampur district), and high-elevation sites near Gangotri and Badrinath, among others.
