= Silobia rufescens =

Scientific classification
- Kingdom: Fungi
- Division: Ascomycota
- Class: Lecanoromycetes
- Order: Acarosporales
- Family: Acarosporaceae
- Genus: Silobia
- Species: S. rufescens

Binomial name
- Silobia rufescens (Ach.) M. Westb. & Wedin (2010)

Synonyms
- Sagedia rufescens Myriospora rufescens Acarospora rufescens Lecanora rufescens Trimmatothelopsis rufescens

Species of lichen

Silobia rufescens is a lichenized fungus, with a dark gray or brown crust-like appearance. It is widespread, and grows on siliceous rock. S. rufescens is in the genus Silobia, which is segregated from the genus Acarospora due to its budding apothecia with only lateral exciple.

== Taxonomy ==
Silobia rufescens was first discovered and originally described as Sagedia rufescens in 1810 by Turner, then as Acarospora rufescens by Kremp in 1861, and lastly as Lecanora rufescens in 1872 by Flora. Many years later, in 2011, the species was first identified as Silobia rufescens by Westberg and Wedin and Trimmatothelopsis rufescens by Roux and Nav. Finally the species was identified as Myriospora rufescens in 2012 by Knudsen and Arcadia. However, in the present time, the species is known again as Silobia rufescens.

== Morphology ==
The thallus of Silobia rufescens has crowded areoles that are 0.3-0.5mm wide and 0.2-0.4mm thick. They are often irregularly shaped, but are sometimes rounded. The upper surface of the fungi is light to dark brown in color. The cortex is 30–40 um thick with hyphae that divide into small cells that tend to be 2 um wide. The lower layer of the cortex is translucent, while the upper layer is dark and 10–20 um thick. The algal layer of S. rufescens is 80-100 um thick with the algal cells dispersed underneath the apothecium. The apothecia are 0.2-0.4mm wide, and there is usually one apothecia per areole. The apothecia are part of a parathecial ring that has a flat disc in the center. The parathecium is 25–40 um wide and tends to form around the flat disc in the center with a blackish color. There are more than 100 ascospores per ascus, and there are no pycnidia observed.

== Ecology and distribution ==
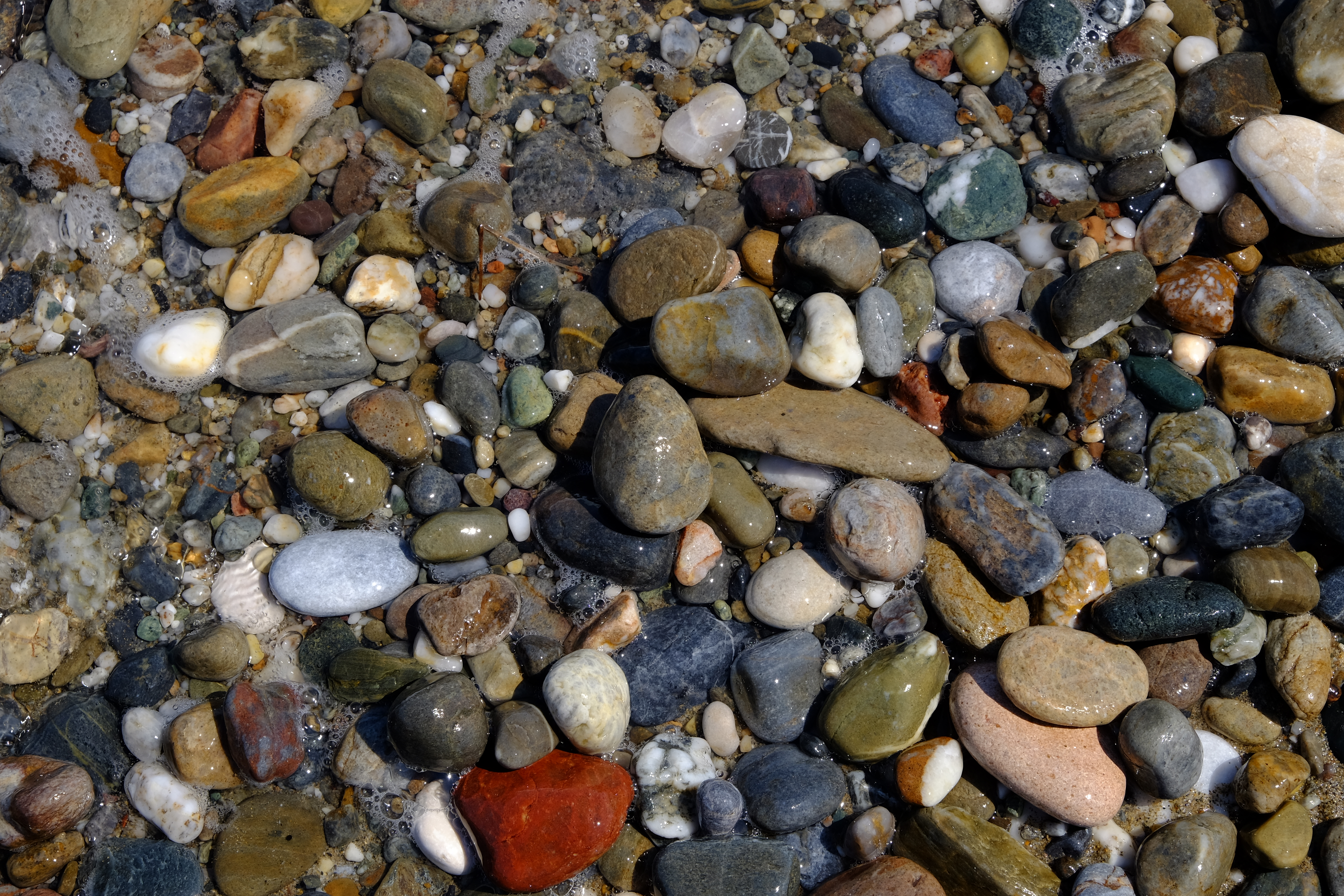
Silobia rufescens grows on siliceous rock, such as sand and pebbles.

Silobia rufescens is widespread, but is "local in the United Kingdom". S. rufescens was found in the United Kingdom beginning in 1929. It has also been found in the Czech Republic, France, Germany, Norway, and Sweden. This species grows on siliceous rock, such as pebbles and sandstones, but it can also be found on man-made structures, such as gravestones and monuments. S. rufescens is found at low elevations.

== Confusion with other species ==
Silobia rufescens is anatomically similar to the species Acarospora fusca, and they are often confused for good reason. There are a few small differences between the two species that aid in telling them apart. A. fusca has a diffused thallus with small areoles, while S. rufescens has an adjoining thallus. The most distinguishing difference between the two species is S. rufescens’ apothecia that is surrounded by an elevated black parathecial ring. In contrast, A. fusca, when it has a parathecial ring, is the same color of the thallus.
