= Nallo =

Mountain in Stuor Räitavagge, Kebnekaise, Sweden

Coordinates: 68°01′19″N 18°25′38″E

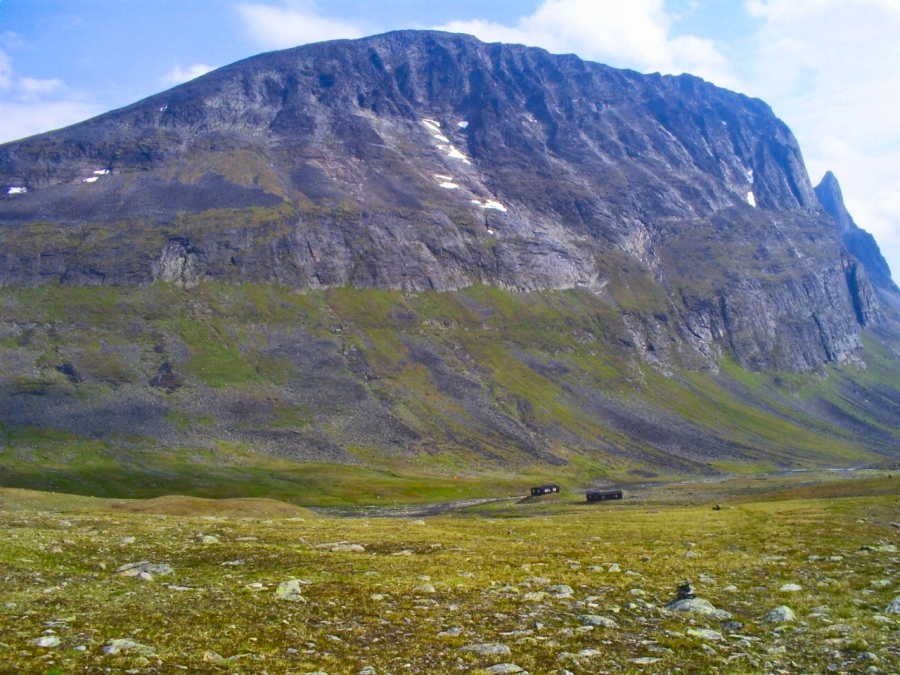
The mountain and associated cabin seen from south in 2006. The "needle" is to the far right.

Nallo, in Northern Sami Njállu, is a mountain in the Stuor Räitavagge valley, which lies in the Kebnekaise area of Sweden. Seen from the Vistasvagge valley in the south east, one part of the mountain has a characteristic, extremely sharp appearance which has given it its Sami name, which in English means The Needle. The mountain reaches to 1585 meters above sea level.

The top of the mountain can be reached from north-west without any particular equipment; this requires merely a hike through rough rock terrain. The top of the "needle", however, is about a hundred meters lower in elevation than the actual peak and climbing it requires exposed scrambling on a narrow ridge.

The Swedish Tourist Association owns a cabin at the foot of the mountain, Nallostugan.
