= Rautas =

Village in Kiruna Municipality, Sweden

Coordinates: 68°00′N 19°52′E

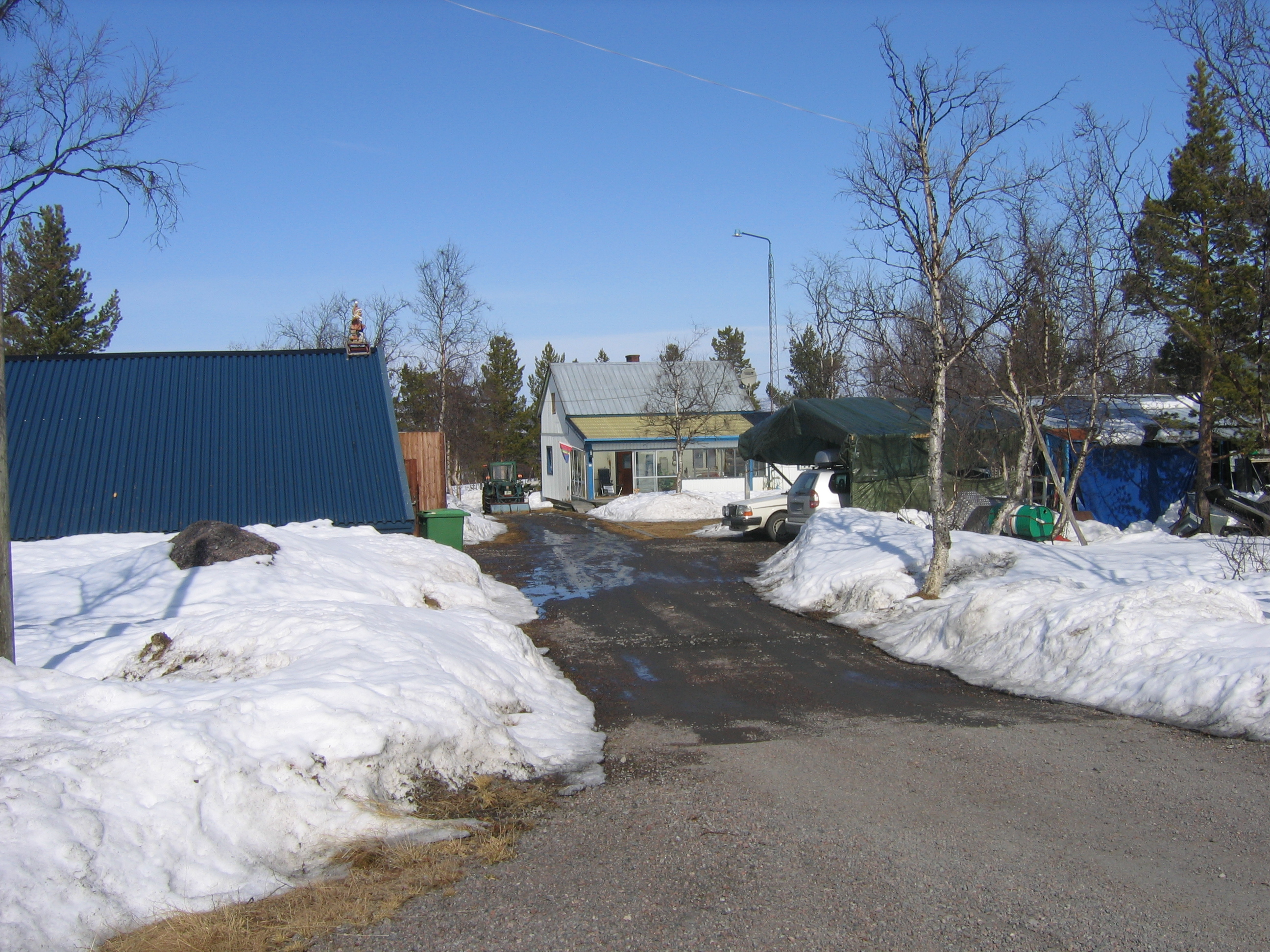
Rautas in spring

Rautas is a village in Kiruna municipality, Norrbotten, Sweden.

It has (2007) 27 inhabitants. It is located at the European route E10 and Malmbanan between Kiruna and Narvik. Rautas lies on an island, Rávttassuolo, between two branches of the Rautas River. From here a snowmobile trail leads to Rautasjaure.
