= Kurravaara =

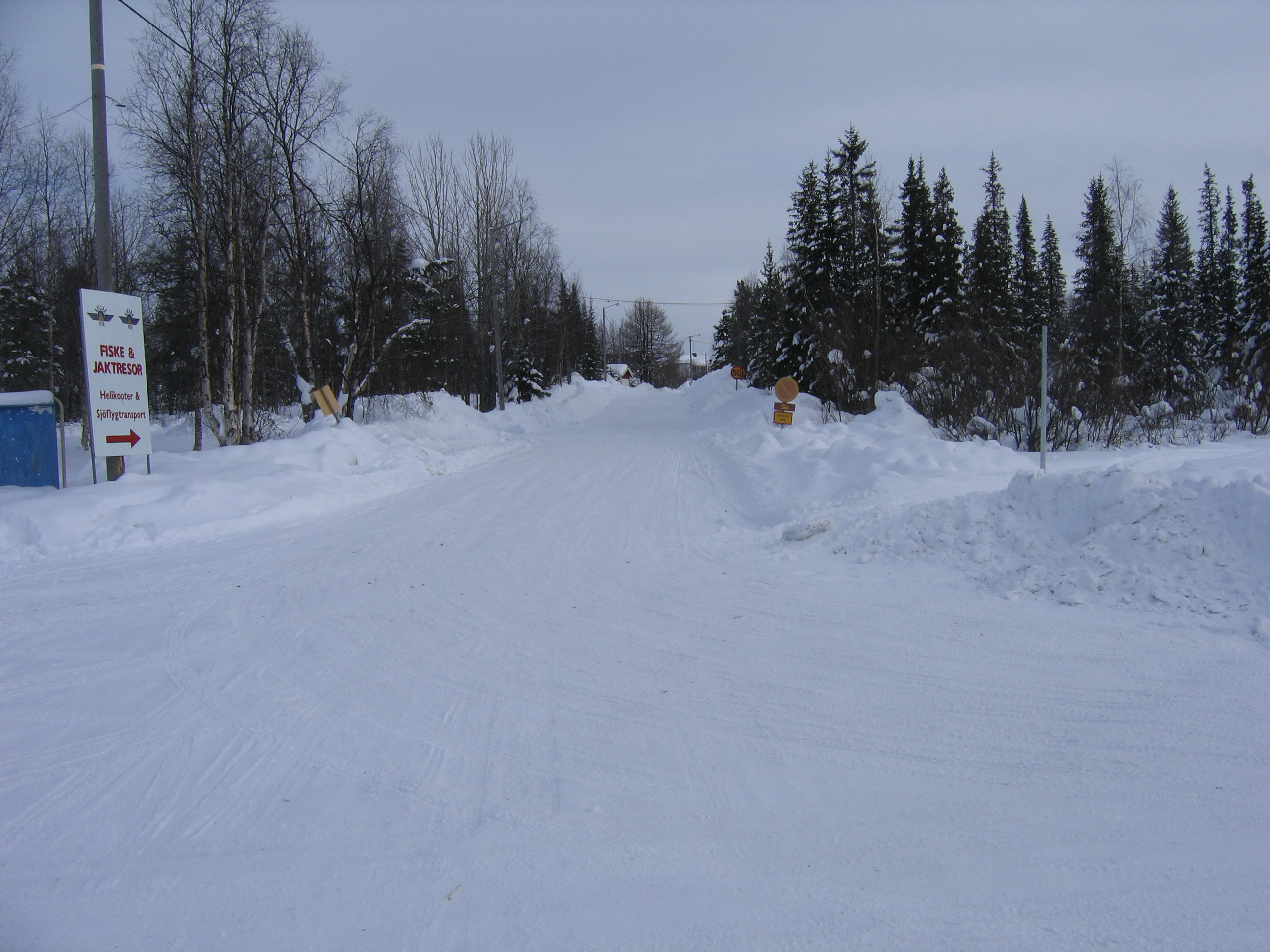
- Kurravaara in March 2008

- Location within Norrbotten Location within Sweden
- Coordinates: 67°57′N 20°21′E
- Country: Sweden
- Province: Lapland
- County: Norrbotten County
- Municipality: Kiruna Municipality

Area
  - Total: 0.15 km^{2} (0.058 sq mi)
- Elevation: 340 m (1,120 ft)

Population (2005-12-31)
  - Total: 57
  - Density: 393/km^{2} (1,020/sq mi)
- Time zone: UTC+1 (CET)
  - Summer (DST): UTC+2 (CEST)
- Website: www.kurravaara.com

Kurravaara (Northern Sami: Gurravárri) is a village 12 km north of Kiruna in Kiruna Municipality, Norrbotten County, Sweden with 57 inhabitants in 2005.

It is the first (highest upstream) village on the Torne River near lake Kallojärvi at 322 meter and is also close to the Rautas River.

Near the end of the 17th century, copper was found in Shangeli and a foundry was placed at what was to become Kurravaara. It is now a popular place for people who want to live close to nature but also close to Kiruna.
