= Stolen (2024 film) =

2024 Swedish film by Elle Márjá Eira

- Netflix poster
- Swedish: Stöld
- Directed by: Elle Márjá Eira
- Written by: Peter Birro
- Based on: Stolen by Ann-Helén Laestadius
- Produced by: Khalil Al Harbiti
- Starring: Elin Kristina Oskal; Martin Wallström
- Cinematography: Ken Are Bongo
- Edited by: Kristofer Nordin
- Music by: Lasse Enersen
- Production companies: Kolibri Productions; Netflix
- Distributed by: Netflix
- Release date: 12 April 2024
- Running time: 107 minutes
- Country: Sweden
- Languages: Sámi; Swedish

Stolen (Swedish: Stöld) is a Swedish drama film directed by Elle Márjá Eira in her feature directorial debut, based on the 2021 novel of the same name by Ann-Helén Laestadius. It was released on Netflix on 12 April 2024.

== Premise ==
Nine-year-old Elsa, a Sámi girl, witnesses her reindeer, Nastegallu, being poached and is frightened into silence. Ten years later, she vows revenge against the poacher.

== Cast ==
- Elin Kristina Oskal as Elsa Stuorbma
  - Risten Alida Siri-Skum as young Elsa
- Martin Wallström as Robert Isaksson, the man who targets the Sámi’s herd of reindeer
- Lars-Ánte Wasara as Mattias, Elsa's brother
  - Nilsa Aleksander Nutti as young Mattias
- Magnus Kuhmunen as Nils-Johan, Elsa’s father
- Ánne Lájlá Westerfjell Kalstad as Marika, Elsa’s mother
- Inger Gunhild Maria Tapio as Áhkku, Elsa’s grandmother
- Pávva Pittja as Lasse, Elsa’s family friend
- Niilá Emanuel Omma as Niila Heatta, Elsa’s love interest
- Ida Persson Labba as Anna-Stina, Elsa’s friend
  - Ellá Márge Nutti as young Anna-Stina
- Matias Tunold as Per-Jonas
- Charlotte Lindmark as Police Officer Martinsson
- Dakota Trancher Williams as Police Officer Ljungblad
- Simon Issát Marainen as Olle, reindeer herder and the village spokesperson
- Juho Kuusamo as Petri Stålnacke
- Esaia Valio Länta as Jon-Isak
- Per Olof Nutti as Johan Heatta
- Anna-Margareta Päiviö as Hanna, Lasse's sister
- Anton Hennix Raukola as Anders Nyqvist
- John Anderberg as Olson
- Jennifer Lila as an American tourist

== Production ==
Director Elle Márjá Eira is Sámi herself and grew up in Kautokeino Municipality. Actress Elin Kristina Oskal is also Sámi, having grown up in Saltdal Municipality in Nordland county. During her school years, Oskal was the only Sámi student in her class. Eira stated that it was important to cast Sámi actors, as they would be familiar with reindeer herding as well as the struggles the Sámi community faces.

Filming took place in Sápmi—specifically Vittangi and Övre Soppero in Norrbotten County, Sweden—in early 2023.

== Release ==
Ahead of the premiere, Netflix released promotional images on 15 February 2024. Two teaser trailers were released on 19 March 2024 and 5 April 2024, respectively.

== Reception ==
Helena Lindblad of Dagens Nyheter gave the film three out of five stars, writing that, at times, the film veered "unnecessarily close" to the source material, becoming "burdensome" and "rigid." She commended Ken Are Bongo's cinematography, writing that the film had an "appealing setting for a story that, albeit bluntly, articulates the magnificence of reindeer herding and how strongly it – although, of course, far from covering everyone – characterizes Sámi culture and identity." Lars Böhlin of Västerbottens-Kuriren also gave the film three out of five stars, calling it "excellent" and commending its set design and cinematography. Karolina Fjellborg of Aftonbladet wrote, "Stolen convinces and touches, and is extremely beautiful to look at, although some aspects of the story feel underdeveloped."
