= Kuttainen =

- Location within Norrbotten Location within Sweden
- Coordinates: 68°22′N 22°48′E
- Country: Sweden
- Province: Lapland
- County: Norrbotten County
- Municipality: Kiruna Municipality

Area
  - Total: 0.60 km^{2} (0.23 sq mi)

Population (31 December 2010)
  - Total: 333
  - Density: 558/km^{2} (1,450/sq mi)
- Time zone: UTC+1 (CET)
  - Summer (DST): UTC+2 (CEST)

Kuttainen is a locality situated in Kiruna Municipality, Norrbotten County, Sweden with 333 inhabitants in 2010.

Kuttainen is located at the Muonio River in which border to Finland goes. On the Finnish side of the river there is a smaller village called Kuttanen. There is no bridge, but the river ice can be used by cars in the winter.
