= Myriospora signyensis =

Scientific classification
- Domain: Eukaryota
- Kingdom: Fungi
- Division: Ascomycota
- Class: Lecanoromycetes
- Order: Acarosporales
- Family: Acarosporaceae
- Genus: Myriospora
- Species: M. signyensis

Binomial name
- Myriospora signyensis Purvis, Fern.-Brime, M.Westb. & Wedin (2018)

Species of lichen

Myriospora signyensis is a crustose lichen in the family Acarosporaceae, known only from Signy Island (South Orkney Islands, Antarctica). It is characterised by a thallus that becomes distinctly lobed and often orange-red or rust-coloured at the margins, and by large, sessile apothecia with a prominent, raised rim. Molecular phylogenetics analyses place it as a well-supported sister to Myriospora scabrida, although it never attains the green-tinged colouration of that species and instead lacks the thick pigmented epinecral layer common in M. scabrida.

== Taxonomy ==
Myriospora signyensis was described as new to science by Purvis and colleagues in 2018 on the basis of material originally misidentified as an Antarctic form of Acarospora badiofusca. Examination of thallus anatomy and molecular sequence data from various molecular markers demonstrated that these specimens form a monophyletic lineage within Myriospora, distinct from all other recognised species in the genus. Although closely related to M. scabrida, M. signyensis differs by its consistently rust-coloured or brown thallus and by having fewer but larger apothecia (fruiting bodies) per areole, which are sessile (i.e. lacking a stipe) and carry a conspicuous margin.

== Description ==
The vegetative body (thallus) of M. signyensis is areolate—composed of discrete, contiguous to slightly overlapping patches called areoles—and typically measures 0.5–1.4 mm across. Towards the outer edges, areoles become lobed or imbricate (overlapping like roof tiles), and the surface ranges from pale orange-red to rust or dark brown when dry, turning grey-brown or greenish when moist. The thallus cortex (outer fungal layer) is 25–80 μm thick and underlain by interrupted clusters of algal cells (the photobiont), which are separated by bundles of fungal hyphae; this 'interrupted photobiont arrangement' is characteristic of the genus.

Each fertile areole bears one to four apothecia—cup- or disc-shaped fruiting bodies that produce spores—measuring 0.2–0.9 mm in diameter. The disc is usually dark brown to black, sometimes dusted with orange-red pruina (a fine powdery coating), and is flat to slightly rough. Surrounding the disc is a raised, pigmented margin (the thalline exciple), which in section is 150–170 μm tall and stains bluish with iodine (a hemiamyloid reaction), a diagnostic feature separating Myriospora from true Acarospora species.

== Habitat and distribution ==
Myriospora signyensis grows epilithically (on rock surfaces), predominantly on quartz-biotite mica schist in montane and nunatak exposures on Signy Island. Field photographs show it colonising iron-stained schist perpendicular to the mineral cleavage plane, often in small patches just above glacial ice. At the time of its original publication, the lichen was known from only five localities scattered across the island, all within the Scotia metamorphic complex. No records exist from other Antarctic islands, although it was suggested that further study of adjacent oceanic outcrops (e.g. Coronation Island) may reveal additional populations.
