= Myriospora westbergii =

Scientific classification
- Kingdom: Fungi
- Division: Ascomycota
- Class: Lecanoromycetes
- Order: Acarosporales
- Family: Acarosporaceae
- Genus: Myriospora
- Species: M. westbergii

Binomial name
- Myriospora westbergii K.Knudsen & Bungartz (2014)
- Holotype: summit of Cerro Gavilan, Santiago Island

Species of lichen

Myriospora westbergii is a species of crustose lichen in the family Acarosporaceae, known only from the highland basalt cliffs of Santiago Island in the Galápagos archipelago. It was recognised as a new species on the basis of collections from the summit of Cerro Gavilan, where its distinctive fruiting structures and occasional orange-tinted surface crystals set it apart from other members of the genus.

== Taxonomy ==
Myriospora westbergii was formally described by Kerry Knudsen and Frank Bungartz in 2014, with the holotype deposited at the Charles Darwin Foundation herbarium (CDS 32258). The species epithet honours the Swedish lichenologist Martin Westberg for his extensive revision of Myriospora and contributions to Acarosporaceae systematics. Within the genus, M. westbergii is most similar in outward appearance to M. hassei—a lichenicolous (lichen-parasite) species of the California coast—but differs in the anatomy and development of its apothecia (the cup-shaped reproductive structures), which become distinctly elevated above the thallus and often develop a blackened, thalline margin (the edge formed by the lichen body itself) rather than remaining immersed or forming only a dark ring around the disc. A second superficially similar taxon, M. scabrida, also produces raised apothecia but these lack the darkened cortex-derived margin and do not bear coarse orange pruina (surface crystals).

== Description ==
The thallus (lichen body) of M. westbergii comprises discrete to closely adjoining areoles—small, roughly circular to irregular 'tiles' of tissue—each 0.7–1.0 mm across and often somewhat squamulose (with edges lifting into tiny scales). The surface ranges from whitish to pale brown, dull, and smooth to slightly uneven, without a powdery coating. Microscopically, the outer cortex includes a thin epicortex of interwoven, transparent hyphae (fungal threads) overlying a pigmented layer that becomes most pronounced in the apothecial margin. The algal partner (photobiont) occurs in packets separated by bundles of hyaline (colourless) hyphae, giving the internal tissue a 'bead-on-string' appearance.

Apothecia are typically solitary on each areole, initially immersed but soon emerging as cup-shaped structures up to a few millimetres wide. The disc is deep reddish-brown and may be dusted with an orange crystalline pruina that dissolves in potassium hydroxide solution, while the surrounding thalline margin becomes raised and progressively darkens from the inside out as the outer hyaline layer erodes, revealing the pigmented cortex beneath. The asci (spore-bearing sacs) are clavate (club-shaped) and contain over 100 hyaline, non-septate spores each measuring about 4 × 2 μm. Conidia (asexual spores) are more or less spherical (subglobose) and about 2 × 1.5 μm. No secondary metabolites were detected by standard spot tests.

== Habitat and distribution ==
As of its original publication, Myriospora westbergii was known only from the summit region of Cerro Gavilan on Santiago Island, Galápagos. There it grows among ferns on steep, north- to north-east-facing basalt cliffs at about 840 m elevation in the humid highland zone, often in rock crevices alongside moisture-loving ferns such as Pityrogramma calomelanos and Dryopteris palmata. No other populations have yet been recorded despite survey of historical herbarium material from multiple institutions.
