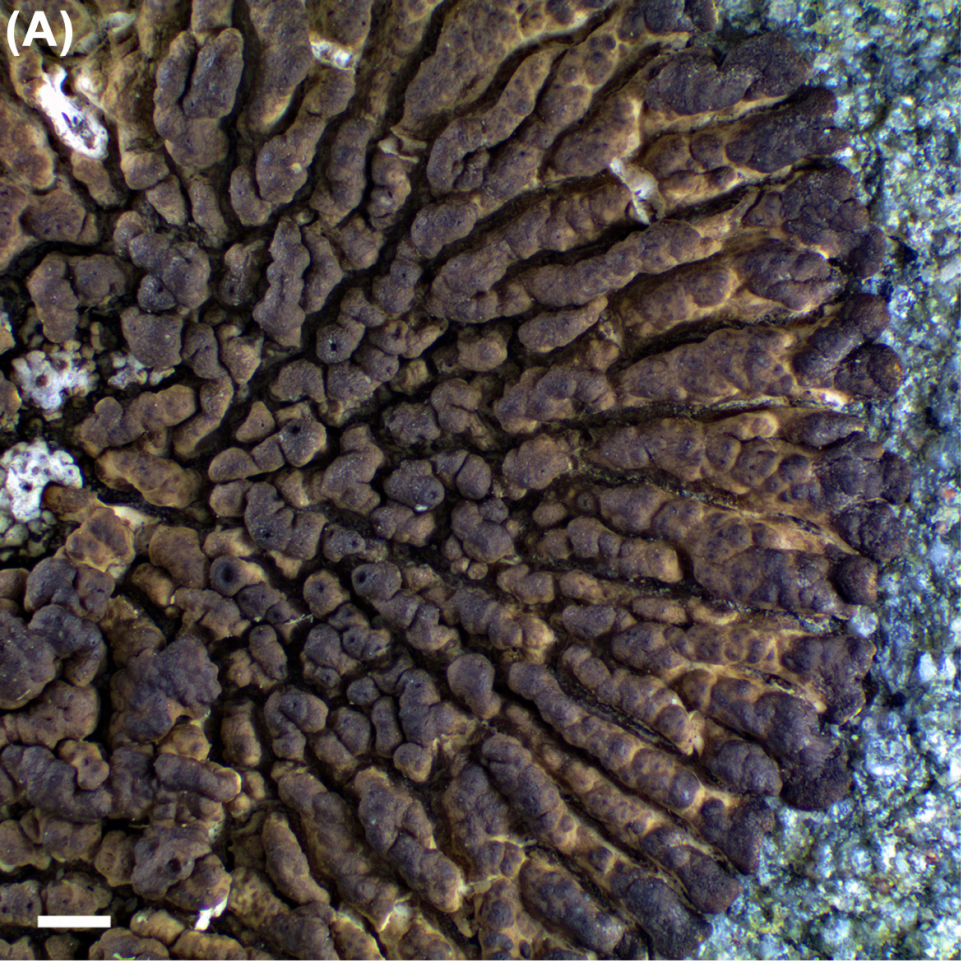
- scale bar = 1 mm

Scientific classification
- Kingdom: Fungi
- Division: Ascomycota
- Class: Lecanoromycetes
- Order: Acarosporales
- Family: Acarosporaceae
- Genus: Myriospora
- Species: M. molybdina

Binomial name
- Myriospora molybdina (Wahlenb.) M.Westb. (2024)

Synonyms
- List: Parmelia molybdina Wahlenb. (1803); Lecanora molybdina (Wahlenb.) Ach. (1810); Lecanora molybdina var. molybdina (Wahlenb.) Ach. (1810); Lichen molybdinus (Wahlenb.) Wahlenb. (1812); Lichen molybdinus var. molybdinus (Wahlenb.) Wahlenb. (1812); Lichen peltatus * molybdina (Wahlenb.) Lam. (1813); Acarospora molybdina (Wahlenb.) Trevis. (1852); Acarospora molybdina f. molybdina (Wahlenb.) Trevis. (1852); Acarospora molybdina var. molybdina (Wahlenb.) Trevis. (1852)

= Myriospora molybdina =

Species of lichen

Myriospora molybdina is a species of saxicolous (rock-dwelling) crustose lichen in the family Acarosporaceae. forms distinctive rosette-like colonies on nutrient-enriched coastal rocks in Arctic regions. Originally described in 1803, the species underwent extensive taxonomic revision before being reclassified into the genus Myriospora in 2024 based on molecular phylogenetics evidence. The lichen is characterized by its prominent finger-like marginal lobes, variable colouration ranging from pale brown to nearly black, and spherical ascospore-producing structures. M. molybdina has a circumpolar Arctic distribution, occurring in northern Norway, Greenland, Svalbard, the Russian Arctic, and Alaska, where it grows exclusively within a few metres of the sea on hard rock surfaces.

== Taxonomy ==
The species was first collected by the Swedish botanist Göran Wahlenberg in northern Norway and originally described in 1803 as Parmelia molybdina. Like many lichens from this era, it underwent numerous name changes as scientists refined their understanding of lichen classification. For much of the 20th century, this Arctic lichen was grouped with several other coastal species under the broad umbrella of Acarospora molybdina. The Swedish lichenologist Adolf Hugo Magnusson, in his 1924 monograph, used an expansive concept that included what are now recognized as four completely separate species across three different genera. This broad grouping created significant confusion that persisted for decades. The situation was further complicated by the description of numerous varieties and forms, including A. molybdina var. confusa, A. brunneola, and others, many of which were based on specimens that actually represented different species entirely. Regional checklists continued to recognize these various names well into the 21st century, with some treating them as distinct taxa distributed along different parts of the Scandinavian coast.

A breakthrough in understanding came through DNA analysis using four genetic markers: internal transcribed spacer regions (ITS), large subunit ribosomal DNA, mitochondrial small subunit DNA, and β-tubulin gene sequences. This molecular evidence, combined with detailed morphological studies, revealed that specimens previously classified as Acarospora molybdina actually comprised two distinct evolutionary lineages. The phylogenetic analysis demonstrated that one group belonged firmly within the genus Acarospora, while the other was more closely related to species in the genus Myriospora. This latter group, representing the true Arctic populations from northernmost Norway and other polar regions, required reclassification.

In 2024, the new combination Myriospora molybdina was formally proposed to reflect this species' proper evolutionary relationships. The genus Myriospora, previously known as the "Acarospora smaragdula group", comprises 13 species of crustose lichens characterized by specific anatomical features, including interrupted algal layers and distinctive spore-bearing structures. The reclassification resolved several nomenclatural puzzles, including why previous phylogenetic studies had placed "Acarospora molybdina" in contradictory evolutionary positions. Those earlier studies had unknowingly analyzed different species—some specimens representing true M. molybdina and others representing A. hysgina, a related but distinct coastal species.

== Description ==
Myriospora molybdina is a crustose lichen that forms distinctive rosette-like patches on coastal rocks, ranging from compact circular growths of 1–10 cm across to sprawling irregular colonies that can reach up to 50 cm in diameter. The lichen's most striking feature is its prominent marginal lobes—finger-like extensions that can stretch up to one cm long and are typically quite thick and substantial, measuring 0.25–1.0 mm wide. The main body (thallus) of the lichen displays a variable colour palette, ranging from pale brown and grey-brown to dark brown or nearly black. Some specimens show pale grey to almost white sections, while others develop rusty red colouration. The surface texture varies considerably, from smooth to strongly bumpy and nodular, giving older specimens a distinctly roughened appearance.

The centre of each colony typically breaks up into small, irregular pieces called areoles, while the outer margins develop the characteristic elongated lobes. These lobes are usually thick and robust rather than flattened, and can reach impressive thicknesses of up to 700 micrometres (μm). The lichen's internal structure reveals a sophisticated organization: green algal cells (the photosynthetic partner) are clustered between thick bundles of fungal threads (hyphae), rather than forming a continuous layer as in many other lichens.

Myriospora molybdina produces numerous small, disc-shaped reproductive structures (apothecia), which emerge from rounded, globe-like swellings on the lobes. These structures are initially tiny and punctate but can expand to 0.4 mm across in mature specimens. The fertile disc typically matches the colour of the surrounding thallus and appears smooth to the naked eye.

Under microscopic examination, the apothecia reveal a unique architecture: the spore-producing layer (hymenium) forms an almost spherical chamber that is much taller than it is wide, measuring 150–230 μm in height. This globose structure, with its narrow opening compared to its internal diameter, is a diagnostic feature that distinguishes this species from related coastal lichens. The upper portion of this chamber develops a reddish-brown cap, while thread-like structures called paraphyses help support and protect the developing spores. Each spore-bearing sac (ascus) contains several hundred tiny spores, which are narrowly elliptical and measure 3–4 by 1.0–1.5 μm. The lichen also produces asexual reproductive structures (pycnidia), which appear as barely visible dark pits on the thallus surface and contain small, fusiform propagules.

== Habitat and distribution ==
Myriospora molybdina is a specialized Arctic lichen with a circumpolar distribution, growing in some of the world's most challenging coastal environments. Unlike many coastal lichens that can tolerate a range of conditions, this species shows strict ecological preferences that limit its occurrence to specific northern regions. This lichen exclusively inhabits nutrient-enriched coastal rocks, typically growing within a few metres of the sea where it benefits from regular marine influence. The species shows a marked preference for sites that receive elevated nitrogen levels, often from seabird activity or other organic enrichment sources. This ecological specialization is reflected in its association with other nitrogen-loving species such as Candelariella arctica, Myriolecis straminea, and Rinodina balanina, which form characteristic coastal communities in the Arctic.

While most populations occur directly on the shoreline, M. molybdina occasionally ventures slightly inland, having been documented growing 100–200 metres from the coast in some locations. This suggests the species can tolerate some distance from direct marine influence, provided suitable nutrient conditions persist. The lichen colonizes granitic and other hard rock surfaces that can withstand the harsh Arctic coastal environment, including frequent freeze-thaw cycles, salt spray, and extreme seasonal variations in light and temperature.

Myriospora molybdina has an Arctic distribution pattern, with confirmed populations spanning multiple continents within polar and subpolar regions. In Scandinavia, the species reaches its southernmost limit and appears restricted to the northernmost counties of Norway, particularly Finnmark. No verified specimens have been collected south of this region, suggesting strict climatic requirements that limit southern expansion. The species has been documented from several Arctic territories including Greenland, where historical collections date back to the 1870s, and the Russian Arctic, with specimens recorded from Novaya Zemlya, various Siberian islands, and coastal Siberian locations. Svalbard populations have been known since the early 1900s, with collections from multiple islands in the archipelago.

North American populations are confirmed from Alaska, particularly the Bering Strait region including St. Lawrence Island, representing the easternmost extent of the species' known range. Additional specimens from eastern Canada suggest the distribution may extend further into the North American Arctic, though comprehensive surveys remain limited.
