= Ann-Helén Laestadius =

Swedish Sámi novelist (born 1971)

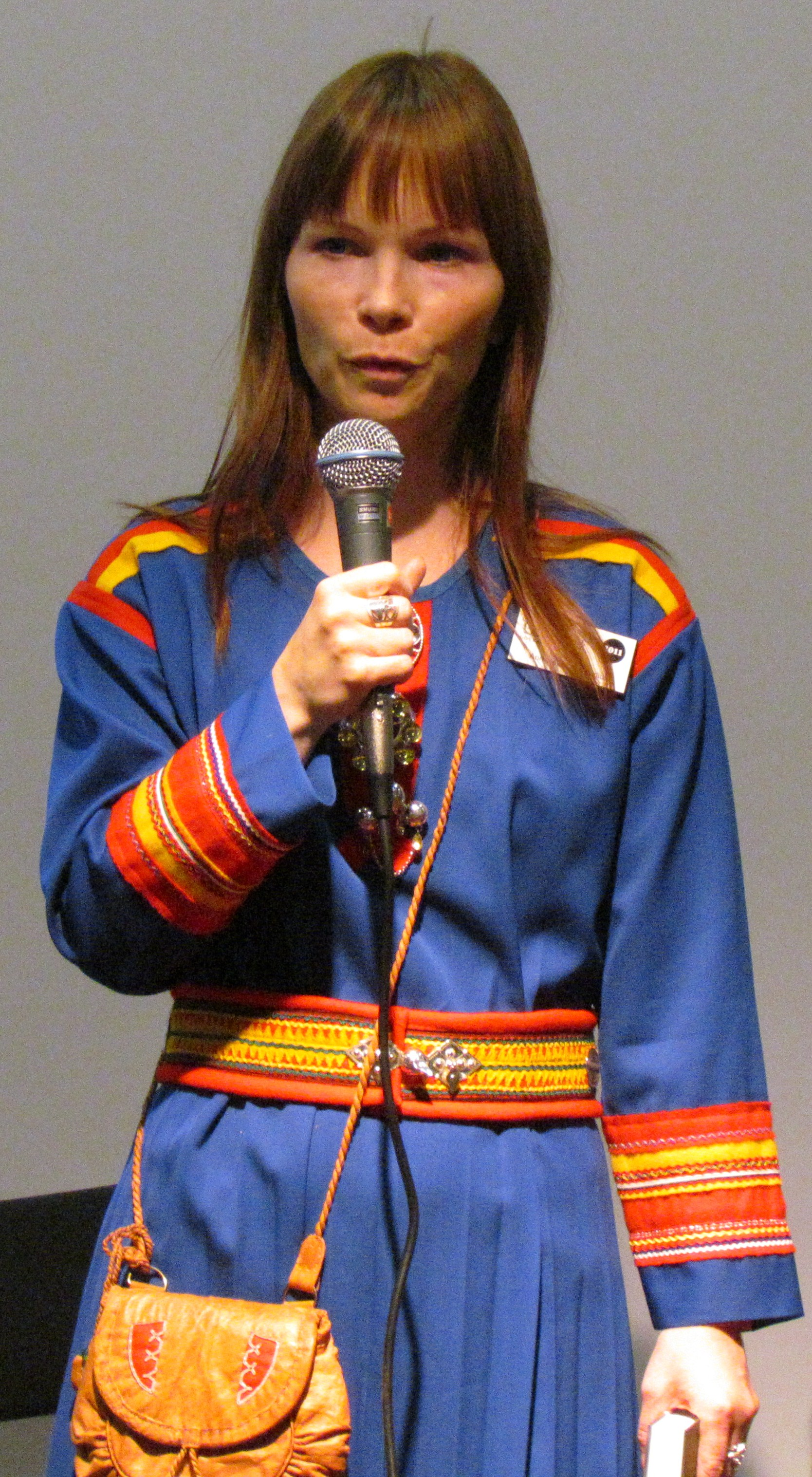
- Ann-Helén Laestadius in 2011
- Born: Monika Ulrika Ann-Helén Laestadius; 3 December 1971 (age 54); Jukkasjärvi, Sweden
- Occupations: Journalist; writer

Monika Ulrika Ann-Helén Laestadius (born 3 December 1971) is a Swedish Sámi journalist and bestselling writer. In 2016, her novel Tio över ett (Ten Past One) won the Swedish August Prize as the best submission in the children and young adult category. She wrote her first adult novel in 2021 titled Stolen, translated to English in 2023 by Rachel Willson-Broyles and became a number 1 paperback bestseller. Netflix released a film adaptation, Stolen, in 2024.

== Biography ==
Born on 3 December 1971 in Jukkasjärvi in the far north of Sweden, Monika Ulrika Ann-Helén Laestadius is the daughter of the municipal employee Ivar Jan-Erik Laestadius (born 1951) and his wife Ellen Sara Kristina née Marainen (born 1948), a shop assistant. Now living in Solna near Stockholm, she has worked as a journalist since 1990. The About the Author section of her novel Stolen says "she is an author and journalist from Kiruna, Sweden. She is Sámi and of Tornedalian descent, two of Sweden's national minorities."

In 2007, she published her first children's novel, Sms från Soppero (Sms from Soppero). It was followed by five others. Her Tio över ett (Ten Past One) won the August Prize for Swedish children's literature in 2016. The jury commented: “It is about the collective grief of a changing community, about civil society and local politics, and about love and friendship. In energetic prose, Laestadius intertwines place, politics and psychology.” She was also awarded the Norrland Literature Prize (Norrlands litteraturpris) for the same work in 2017.
