= Trimmatothelopsis sphaerosperma =

Scientific classification
- Kingdom: Fungi
- Division: Ascomycota
- Class: Lecanoromycetes
- Order: Acarosporales
- Family: Acarosporaceae
- Genus: Trimmatothelopsis
- Species: T. sphaerosperma

Binomial name
- Trimmatothelopsis sphaerosperma (R.C.Harris & K.Knudsen) K.Knudsen & Kocourk. (2021)
- Type locality: Devil's Knob-Devil's Backbone Natural Area, Arkansas, US

Synonyms
- Acarospora sphaerosperma R.C.Harris & K.Knudsen (2011)

Species of lichen-forming fungus

Trimmatothelopsis sphaerosperma is a species of crustose lichen in the family Acarosporaceae. Originally described in 2011 as Acarospora sphaerosperma from dolomite in Arkansas, it was transferred to the genus Trimmatothelopsis in 2021 based on morphological and anatomical features, because DNA sequencing attempts were unsuccessful in that treatment. The species forms scattered waxy white areoles (small surface patches) with small red-brown apothecial discs and is distinguished by its tall hymenium (spore-bearing layer); asci that contain more than 100 mostly spherical ascospores; and long, rod-shaped conidia (asexual spores). It grows on calcium-rich rocks including dolomite, limestone, and chert, and has been recorded in North America, Europe, and Asia.

== Taxonomy ==
Acarospora sphaerosperma was described as a new species in 2011 by Kerry Knudsen and Richard C. Harris, based on a collection from dolomite (a calcium-rich rock) at the Devil's Knob–Devil's Backbone Natural Area (Izard County, Arkansas, US). The species epithet sphaerosperma refers to the predominantly spherical ascospores.

In 2021, Knudsen and coauthors transferred the species to Trimmatothelopsis, publishing the new combination Trimmatothelopsis sphaerosperma. The transfer was based on physical and microscopic features used to define Trimmatothelopsis: polyspored crustose lichens with spherical apothecia, a tall hymenium, narrow paraphyses, and long, rod-shaped conidia. Attempts to obtain DNA sequences failed because of contamination, so the 2021 transfer did not include new DNA evidence. Some Czech collections were initially misidentified (for example as an unknown Thelocarpon or, because of the unusually large spores, as a possible unusual form (morphotype) of Acarospora murorum).

In 2022, Knudsen and colleagues concluded that Acarospora schorica is the oldest available name for the species previously treated as Trimmatothelopsis sphaerosperma and therefore has naming priority under botanical nomenclature; they proposed the new combination Trimmatothelopsis schorica. The species was reported from Asia, Europe, and North America, and a phylogenetic analysis of DNA sequences supported its placement in Trimmatothelopsis.

== Description ==
The thallus consists of scattered to locally merging areoles (small surface patches) that arise directly from the rock and may form patches up to about 5 cm across. Individual areoles are broadly attached, round to irregular, typically about 0.5–1.0 mm wide and usually less than about 0.4 mm tall. The upper surface is waxy white and glossy, turning green when wet. Young areoles often show a small red dot at the center, interpreted as either a pycnidium (an asexual structure) or a developing apothecium beneath the surface.

Apothecia usually develop one per areole. They form beneath the surface and later break through, so the disc first appears as a tiny point-like (punctiform) red-brown spot and later expands to a small concave disc (to about 0.4 mm across). Under the microscope, the hymenium (spore-bearing layer) is tall (reported around 170–200 μm, with higher values noted as possible), and the paraphyses (sterile filaments among the asci) are narrow (about 1 μm wide). Asci contain many spores (often more than 100), and the ascospores are hyaline (colorless) and mostly globose, typically about 7–10(–12) μm in diameter (or broadly ellipsoid, about 7–9 × 5–7 μm). Pycnidia are rare. The conidia (asexual spores) are rod-shaped and were reported as about 5–6 × 1–1.3 μm in the original description, while a later summary gave conidia as 4–5 × 1–1.5 μm. No secondary metabolites were detected; standard spot tests were negative (K−, C−, KC−, P−, UV−).

== Habitat and distribution ==
Trimmatothelopsis sphaerosperma is a calciphile (calcium-loving), occurring on calcium-rich rocks. In North America it is known from the Ozarks (including Arkansas and multiple sites in Missouri), with an additional record from Ohio; recorded substrates include dolomite, limestone, chert, and calcareous rubble or pebbles in alkaline settings.

A 2021 treatment expanded the documented range to Europe (Czech Republic) and summarized the substrate range more broadly as dolomite, limestone, marlite, chert, speculite, and opoka (a calcareous sedimentary sandstone).
