= Caeruleum (lichen) =

Scientific classification
- Kingdom: Fungi
- Division: Ascomycota
- Class: Lecanoromycetes
- Order: Acarosporales
- Family: Acarosporaceae
- Genus: Caeruleum; Knudsen & Arcadia, 2012

Type species
- Caeruleum heppii Knudsen & Arcadia, 2012

Other species
- C. immersum Knudsen & Arcadia, 2012

Genus of lichen fungi

Caeruleum is a genus of lichen-forming fungi in the family Acarosporaceae. Two species are currently recognized, C. heppii and C. immersum. Caeruleum is generally similar to the related genus Acarospora.

== Naming ==
The generic name, "Caeruleum", refers to the blue color stain of the tholus after treatment with Lugol's iodine.

== Taxonomy ==
The genus Caeruleum was described in 2012 by Linda in Arcadia and Kerry Knudsen, with the type species Caeruleum heppii ("Hepp's cracked lichen"). C. heppii had previously been described as a species of both Acarospora and Myriospora. An additional combination was also erected as Caeruleum immersum. C. immersum has also been assigned as a species of Acarospora and Myriospora in the past. Arcadia & Knudsen (2012) noted that future research may indicate that C. immersum represents a synonym of C. heppii.

Caeruleum is one of eleven genera within the Acarosporaceae family of fungi.
