= Trimmatothelopsis americana =

Scientific classification
- Kingdom: Fungi
- Division: Ascomycota
- Class: Lecanoromycetes
- Order: Acarosporales
- Family: Acarosporaceae
- Genus: Trimmatothelopsis
- Species: T. americana

Binomial name
- Trimmatothelopsis americana (K.Knudsen & Lendemer) K.Knudsen & Lendemer (2016)

Synonyms
- Melanophloea americana K.Knudsen & Lendemer (2011); Thelenella americana (K.Knudsen & Lendemer) Aptroot (2012)

Species of lichen-forming fungus

Trimmatothelopsis americana is a species of saxicolous (rock-dwelling) crustose lichen in the family Acarosporaceae. Originally described in 2011 as Melanophloea americana from Pennsylvania, it was reclassified in the genus Trimmatothelopsis in 2016 based on DNA sequence comparisons. The species is recognized by tiny black, dome-shaped apothecia (fruiting bodies) with small concave discs; under the microscope, asci contains hundreds of narrow ascospores, and it usually lacks an obvious thallus (lichen body). Known only from the Mid-Atlantic region of eastern North America, it grows on silica-rich (siliceous) rocks in humid riparian habitats, often in a narrow band just above the usual waterline, where floods periodically wet the rock.

== Taxonomy ==
Trimmatothelopsis americana was originally described in 2011 as Melanophloea americana by Kerry Knudsen and James Lendemer. The holotype (the reference specimen) was collected in Pennsylvania (Montgomery County, Pennypack Watershed) in November 1987 on silicate (silica-rich) rock. In the original treatment, the species was placed in Melanophloea (then treated in the Thelocarpaceae) and compared with the type species M. pacifica, a lichen that grows on rainforest bark in the western Pacific. The authors also noted that this was the first report of Melanophloea from North America.

In 2012 it was transferred toThelenella as Thelenella americana, Knudsen and Kocourková rejected that placement in 2013 and continued to treat the species as Melanophloea, ejecting that placement on structural grounds: its fruiting bodies resemble those of Thelocarpon and its spore sacs (asci) are two-walled, iodine-positive, and contain many spores—features treated as inconsistent with Thelenella.

In 2016, mtSSU (mitochondrial small-subunit) DNA sequences placed the species in the family Acarosporaceae, within an evolutionary group (clade) treated as Trimmatothelopsis. In 2016 they transferred the species and published the new combination Trimmatothelopsis americana proposing that Melanophloea should be restricted to its type species, with other rock-dwelling taxa (including this one) excluded from the genus. They also treated the name Thelenella americana as a synonym and rejected a placement in Thelenella and the Thelenellaceae.

== Description ==
A distinct thallus is usually not apparent. Instead, it is usually noticed as small black apothecia (fruiting bodies) that sit on the rock surface, sometimes scattered and sometimes clustered. Individual apothecia are typically about 0.1–0.5 mm across and dome-shaped; when wet they remain black. At the apex, each apothecium has a tiny, colourless hyaline, concave disc (to about 0.1 mm wide) bordered by a narrow pale yellowish-brown ring. Apothecia can occasionally become compound, with two to four discs, before splitting into separate apothecia.

In cross-section, the apothecial wall is up to about 80 μm (micrometers) thick. The outer layer is carbonized (blackened). Inside is a zone of colourless fungal threads (hyphae) with scattered green algal cells. The spore-bearing layer (hymenium) is roughly spherical (globose), about 150–225 μm high, and turns blue with iodine (I+), later becoming red. The paraphyses (sterile filaments among the asci) are thin and not noticeably widened at their tips. The asci are cylindrical to narrowly club-shaped (clavate) and polysporous (hundreds of spores per ascus), and the ascospores are simple, hyaline, and very narrow (about 3–5 × 0.5–1 μm). No asexual fruiting structures (conidiomata) were observed in the original description. Pycnidia (asexual fruiting bodies) were later reported as rare, with bacilliform conidia about 4–6 × 1 μm (based on a single observed pycnidium).

No secondary metabolites have been detected using thin-layer chromatography, and standard spot tests were all negative (K−, C−, KC−, P−, UV−).

== Habitat and distribution ==
Trimmatothelopsis americana is a saxicolous species of siliceous rocks in humid settings, especially along streams and rivers. The holotype specimen had soil deposits that were interpreted as the result of flooding. Known records are limited to fewer than five localities in the Mid-Atlantic region of eastern North America, from southeastern Pennsylvania and New York north to eastern Massachusetts. The original description documented three sites (two in southeastern Pennsylvania and one in New York). It suggested that it may be naturally rare and confined to riparian rock, or it may have declined after agricultural and urban land-use change. Additional surveys in southeastern Pennsylvania were recommended to clarify its status.

It has been recorded on sun-exposed rock surfaces just above the waterline, within a narrow band that floods periodically. This flood-prone band may limit competition from other lichens on the same outcrops. The tiny black apothecia can resemble pycnidia at a glance, so surveys may overlook the species.
