= Rautas River =

Coordinates: 68°4′26″N 19°22′48″E

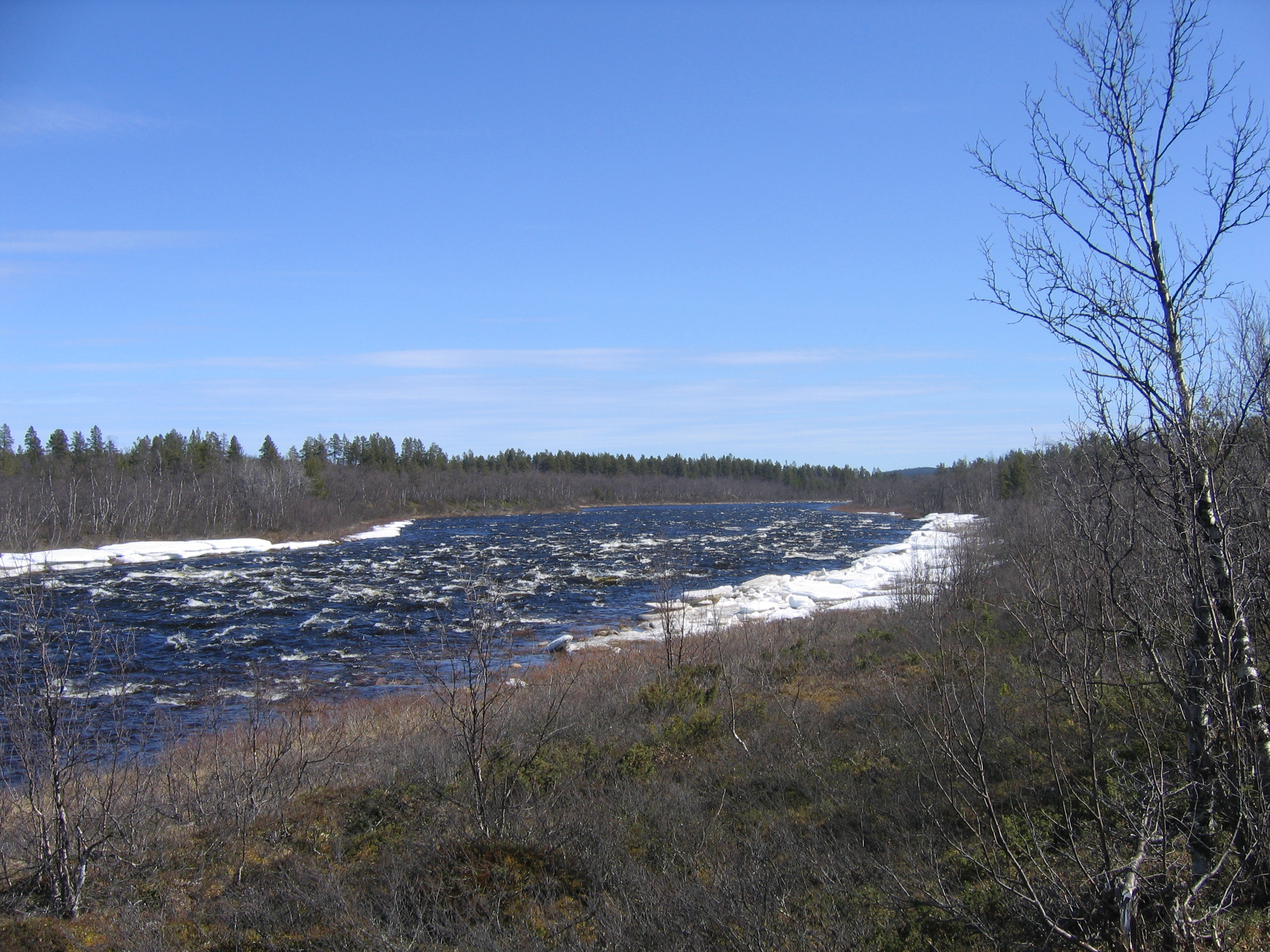
- Rautas River between Käyrävuopio and Hansisaari, Kurravaara
- Native name: Rautasälven (Swedish); Rávttaseatnu (Northern Sami)

Location
- Country: Sweden

Physical characteristics
- Source: Rautasjaure
  - elevation: 560 m (1,840 ft)
- Mouth: Torne River
  - elevation: 327 m (1,073 ft)
- Length: 134.699 km (83.698 mi)

The Rautas River (Swedish: Rautasälven, Northern Sami: Rávttaseatnu) is an early contributary to the Torne River in Swedish Lapland.

It originates in Rautasjaure (Lake Rautas) in the mountains of northwestern Lapland, at an elevation of 560 m above mean sea level. A footpath leads to Rautasjaure from Rensjön. In winter the lake can be reached by snowmobile. From there it flows eastward through roadless land. On the right, southern bank, Subasjohka, Seppojokha join the river and the river flows into the Guolášjávri lake, where it is joined by Snánnavieddji (left/north) and Durkkejohka (right/south). It enters Rautas fjällurskogs naturreservat, meeting Leavášjohka and Geinnodakjohka on the right, and splits shortly before Rautas. It splits in a western and an eastern part, Alit Suorri / Västra Rautasälven (met by Njuohčamjohka) and Lulit Suorri / Östra Rautasälven. Those branches are approximately 3km apart. In the middle between those two branches lies the village of Rautas (Rávttas). The European route E10 crosses both branches. After 6-10 km, the branches meet again and the river continues in a southeasterly direction. It passes by the village of Käyrävuopio shortly before the stream Tiansbäken (Vuonajohka) flows into the river from the right/south. Then it continuous through uninhabited land, with Pahtajoki flowing into it on the right, before passing by a place where a footpath leads toward the river from the south (see photo). The Käyräjohki and Askajoki join from the left. After this, the river turns north. A track leads from Kurravaara to near the place where the river turns north. It flows into flatter land where some islands such as Hansisaari are in the river. Finally, it flows into Vahkujávri, which is part of the Torne River, at an elevation of 327 m, after nearly 135 km.

== Sources ==
- Lantmäteriets Fjällkarta BD4 Kiruna, December 2006
