= Myriospora (alveolate) =

Scientific classification
- Domain: Eukaryota
- (unranked): SAR
- (unranked): Alveolata
- Phylum: Apicomplexa
- Class: Conoidasida
- Order: Eucoccidiorida
- Suborder: Eimeriorina
- Family: Myriosporidae
- Genus: Myriospora Lemantoff 1913

Species
- Myriospora petaloprocti Myriospora trophoniae

Genus of single-celled organisms

Myriospora is a genus of parasitic alveolates belonging to the phylum Apicomplexa.

== Taxonomy ==
This genus was created in 1913 by Lermantoff.

Currently two species are recognised in this genus.
