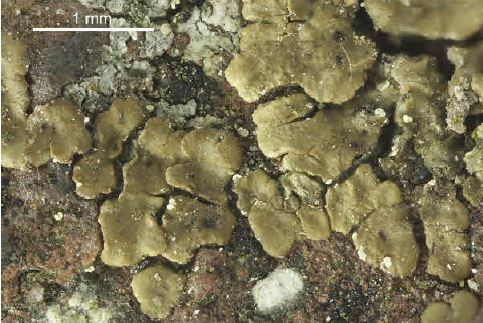
- Myriospora smaragdula

Scientific classification
- Kingdom: Fungi
- Division: Ascomycota
- Class: Lecanoromycetes
- Order: Acarosporales
- Family: Acarosporaceae
- Genus: Myriospora (Ach.) Nägeli (1853)

Type species
- Myriospora smaragdula (Wahlenb. ex Ach.) Nägeli ex Uloth (1861)

Synonyms
- Acarospora sect. Myriospora Nägeli ex Jatta (1910); Myriospora Nägeli (1853); Placodium subgen. Myriospora Nägeli ex Müll.Arg. (1862); Silobia M.Westb. & Wedin (2010)

= Myriospora (fungus) =

Genus of lichen-forming fungi

Myriospora is a genus of crustose (crust-like), rock-dwelling lichens in the family Acarosporaceae. Its small, often mosaic-cracked thalli bear minute, blackish fruiting discs that each release dozens of colourless spores, a feature alluded to by the genus name—which means "countless spores". Following a 2024 transfer of Acarospora molybdina into the group, around thirteen species are accepted; the type species, M. smaragdula, is a common emerald-tinged "rock scale" on sun-exposed stone across the Holarctic realm.

The genus was proposed in 1853 as a segregate of Acarospora but the original description fell short of the formal rules then in force. Wilhelm Uloth supplied a validating description in 1861, yet for more than a century lichenologists kept the group within Acarospora. Molecular studies in the early 2000s showed that the so-called A. smaragdula complex forms its own evolutionary lineage; competing names (Silobia, Trimmatothelopsis) were put forward, but in 2012 Arcadia and Knudsen demonstrated that Uloth's Myriospora antedates them and therefore has priority. The genus is distinguished by an interrupted algal layer, a very tall hymenium, and asci packed with scores of one-celled spores—characters that separate it from Acarospora in the strict sense and from the blue-green genus Caeruleum.

Species of Myriospora are ecological generalists within harsh settings: they colonise siliceous and, less commonly, calcareous rock in deserts, temperate uplands, maritime cliffs and polar outcrops, with one Antarctic endemic (M. signyensis) extending the genus to every continent except Australia. Several members tolerate heavy-metal enrichment and can bioaccumulate iron or copper, making them early pioneers on mine tailings and freshly exposed bedrock. By penetrating mineral grains and trapping airborne dust they contribute to the first stages of soil formation, paving the way for mosses, vascular plants and a broader cryptogamic community.

== Taxonomy ==
The genus Myriospora is a lichen-forming fungal genus in the family Acarosporaceae. It was originally established (circumscribed in the mid-19th century as a segregate from the genus Acarospora. The name Myriospora ("many spores") was introduced by Johann Adam Philipp Hepp in 1853 (attributed to Nägeli) for a group of crustose lichens with numerous spores per ascus. However, Hepp's publication did not meet all formal requirements, so for a long time Myriospora was not accepted as a validly published genus and its species were included within Acarospora. In 1861, Wilhelm Uloth provided a brief validating description (in German), noting Myriospora as having "apothecia almost cup-like" with "spores one-celled, egg-shaped or elliptical, in great number in one ascus". This early validation by Uloth (1861) means the correct author citation is Myriospora Nägeli ex Uloth (1861). Despite this early recognition, most lichenologists treated Myriospora as a synonym of Acarospora for over a century.

In the 2000s, the genus Myriospora was resurrected and re-evaluated. Richard C. Harris (2004) informally resurrected Myriospora for a North American species (Acarospora immersa), and Harris and Knudsen (2006) further clarified the nomenclature and lectotypified the genus. They believed the name had been effectively published by Hue in 1909, but later work showed Uloth's 1861 publication had priority. During the same period, molecular phylogenetics studies provided new insights. Researchers found that the Acarospora "smaragdula group" (a subset of species around Acarospora smaragdula) formed a clade separate from Acarospora in the strict sense. For example, phylogenies by Wedin and colleagues (2005) and Crewe and colleagues (2006) showed that the A. smaragdula complex lies outside the core Acarospora lineage. This evidence supported recognizing a distinct genus for this group.

In 2011, Westberg & Wedin formalized a new genus Silobia for the A. smaragdula complex. They described several species from Sweden under Silobia (including S. smaragdula, S. dilatata, S. myochroa, etc.) based on morphology, secondary chemistry, and preliminary phylogenies. Concurrently, the lichenologists Claude Roux and Pere Navarro-Rosinés (2011) had used yet another name (Trimmatothelopsis) for essentially the same group. This led to confusion over the correct genus name for these lichens. The issue was resolved in 2012 by "Linda in Arcadia" and Kerry Knudsen, who argued that Myriospora had been validly published by Uloth and therefore had priority. They typified Myriospora on M. smaragdula (the common emerald-coloured "rock scale" lichen) and placed Silobia and Trimmatothelopsis in synonymy with Myriospora. In other words, the species that had recently been called Silobia were reassigned to Myriospora. Seven new combinations in Myriospora were published at that time (e.g. M. dilatata, M. scabrida, M. tangerina, M. myochroa, M. rhagadiza, M. rufescens, M. hassei, etc.), solidifying the genus's revival. Arcadia and Knudsen also introduced a new genus, Caeruleum, for a different lineage of blue-green Acarospora species (such as A. heppii and A. immersa) that had been erroneously included in Myriospora; those have a different ascus-type (with an amyloid apex) and are now excluded from Myriospora.

Myriospora is now accepted as a distinct genus within Acarosporaceae, comprising the former A. smaragdula species group. It is closely related to (but separate from) the genus Acarospora. The current consensus, based on morphological and molecular evidence, is that Myriospora represents a monophyletic clade defined by unique traits. In 2024, a Nordic‐Baltic phylogenetic re-assessment transferred the coastal species Acarospora molybdina into Myriospora as M. molybdina, expanding the genus to 13 currently accepted species. That same study recovered Acarospora hysgina in the core Acarospora clade, clarifying that its superficially similar thallus is an example of convergent evolution and should not be included in Myriospora. A parallel body of work (2021–2023) employed multi-locus datasets and denser taxon sampling to resurrect Trimmatothelopsis as a separate, monophyletic lineage within Acarosporaceae, sister to Myriospora rather than nested inside it; those authors recombined species such as M. benedarensis, M. versipellis, M. oreophila and M. sphaerosperma under Trimmatothelopsis.

== Description ==
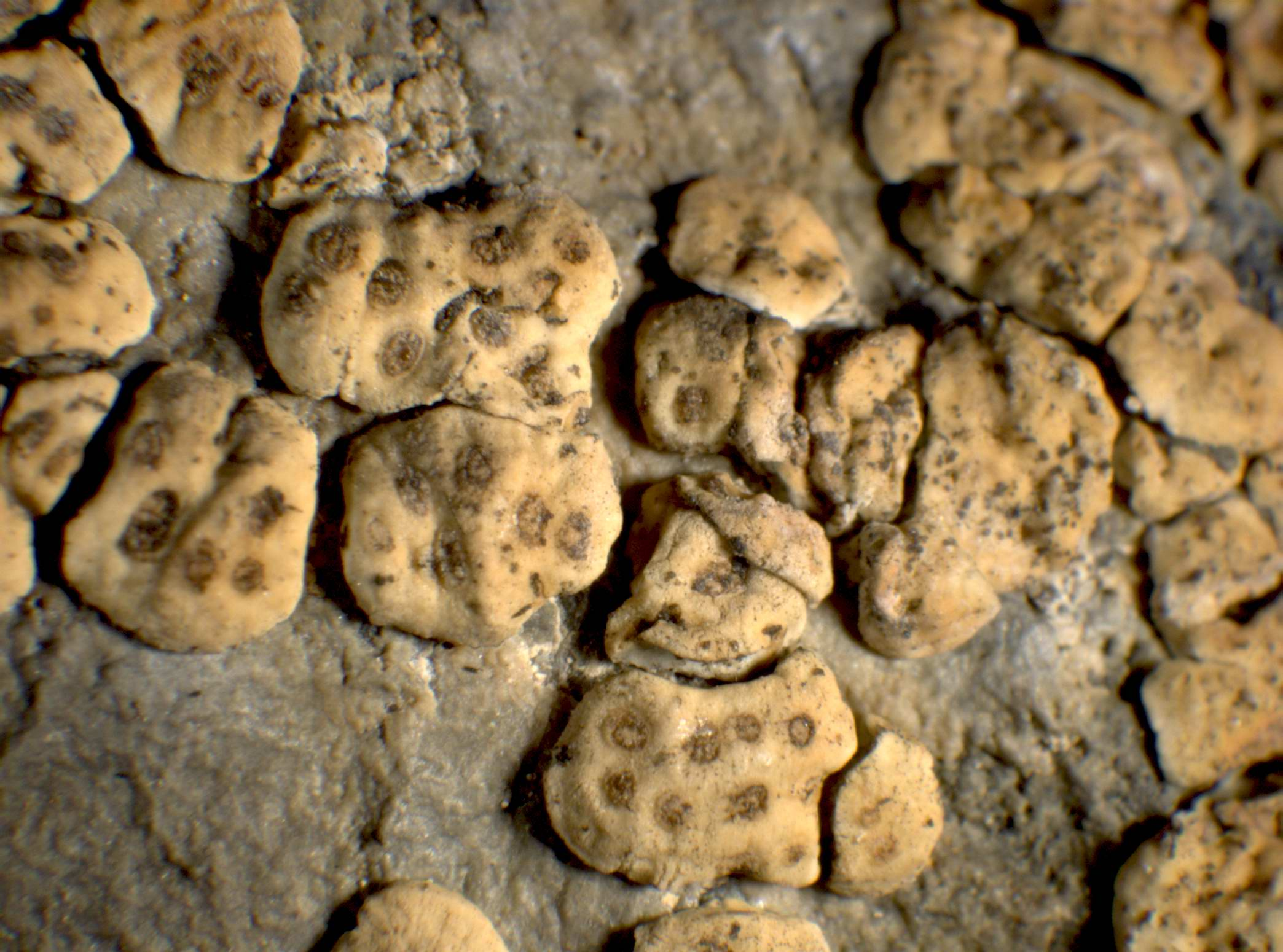
The crustose, rock-dwelling lichen Myriospora myochroa

=== Thallus ===
Myriospora lichens have a crustose, areolate to squamulose thallus. One recently added member, M. molybdina, departs from the typical areolate habit by forming a thin, placodioid (lobate-margined) crust with narrow, lead-grey lobes up to 0.6 mm wide. The thallus typically forms a contiguous patch of small polygonal areoles (scale-like units) that may appear cracked like a mosaic or pavement. Areoles are usually firmly attached to the substrate (rock) by their entire lower surface, though in some species they can be slightly raised with a narrow base (squamulose). The upper surface of the thallus varies in colour from grey or brown to rust-orange or dark brown-black, sometimes with a dull olive or greenish tinge (the name smaragdula means emerald, referring to a greenish hue seen in that species). Many species develop a pruina (fine frost-like coating of crystals) on the apothecia or thallus surface, giving a whitish or bluish bloom. For example, M. himalayensis has a white pruinose disc on its apothecia. The cortex (upper surface skin) is often well-developed and can appear shiny in xeric habitats due to an epicortex polysaccharide layer. The cortex is composed of a layer of hyphae and sometimes swollen cells; it is pigmented in the upper part (giving the thallus its colour) and generally colourless below. In some cases, crystals of secondary compounds are present in the cortex and can be seen under polarized light. There is no distinct lower cortex in most species (the thallus bottom is indistinguishable and directly attached to rock), except in soil-dwelling species where a lower tomentum or rhizines may occur.

=== Photobiont ===
The photobiont is a chlorococcoid green alga (a unicellular alga, often Trebouxia or related). A defining microscopic feature of Myriospora is the interruption of the algal layer: the algal cells, instead of forming one continuous band within the thallus, are broken into discrete clusters or patches by vertical bundles of sterile hyphae (medullary hyphae) that extend upward from the medulla towards the cortex. In cross-section, these appear as columnar bundles cutting through the algal layer. This "broken" or interrupted photobiont layer is a key diagnostic trait of Myriospora. (In Acarospora, the algal layer is typically continuous, not regularly disrupted, although a few Acarospora species can occasionally show minor interruptions.) The medullary hyphae bundles in Myriospora often reach the upper cortex, sometimes forming pustule-like bumps or faint spots on the surface where they protrude. This feature can be subtle without microscopic examination, but it reflects a distinctive internal anatomy. The continuous, unbroken photobiont layer seen in Trimmatothelopsis provides the quickest microscopic distinction between that genus and Myriospora.

=== Apothecia ===
Myriospora produces apothecia (disk-like fruiting bodies) that are usually immersed or adnate in the areoles. Typically, each areole will develop one apothecium in its centre (occasionally 2–3 in larger areoles). The apothecium may start nearly flush with the thallus (a small punctate pit or dot) and later become more evident as the true exciple (the rim of proper tissue around the disc) expands. In Myriospora, the apothecia often appear lecanorine – meaning they have a thallus-coloured margin – but in fact the margin is formed by the expanded exciple (sometimes called a parathecial crown) rather than the algal thallus itself. This exciple can become quite prominent and thick in some species, giving the apothecia a distinct raised rim or a nearly cup-like appearance. The disc (hymenial surface) of the apothecium is usually darkly pigmented – often black, brown-black, or dark red-brown – sometimes with a glossy or uneven (rugose) texture. In many specimens the disc is covered by a pruinose coating (whitish or blue-grey), which can obscure its true colour. Some species also accumulate pigments or granules on the disc surface. The apothecia are generally small (often less than 0.5 mm in diameter), but can be larger and more elevated in certain species (for example, M. signyensis in Antarctica has unusually large, prominent apothecia up to about 0.7 mm). There are no perithecia or mazaedia in this genus (only apothecial ascomata).

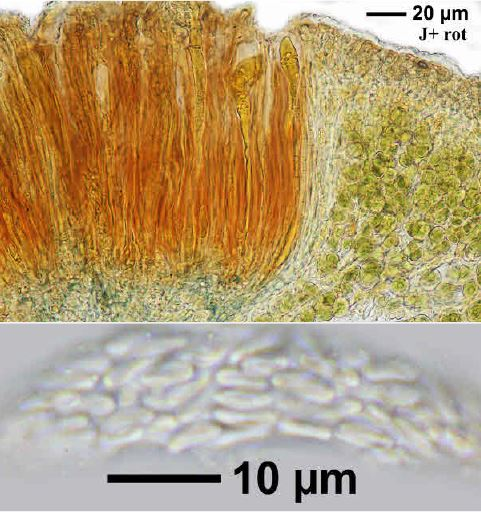
Longitudinal section of an apothecium of Myriospora smaragdula (upper image) shows the tall, iodine-positive reddish hymenium compared to the green photobiont layer; the lower image depicts a single ascus densely packed with minute, ellipsoid, one-celled ascospores. Scale bars: 20 μm (top) and 10 μm (bottom).

Microscopically, Myriospora has a hymenium that is tall relative to Acarospora. The hymenium (the layer containing the asci) can reach 150–200 micrometres (μm) in height in some species, whereas many Acarospora have hymenia around 60–120 μm tall. In M. molybdina the hymenium is even taller (160–230 μm) than in the type species, whereas A. hysgina remains at 100–125 μm—one of several characters separating the two look-alikes. The paraphyses (sterile filamentous hyphae in the hymenium) are characteristically thin and unbranched in Myriospora. They are usually about 1 μm thick (occasionally up to 2 μm at mid-height) and may have slightly expanded tips with small pigmented caps, but not as markedly swollen as in some Acarospora. In contrast, Acarospora often has stouter paraphyses (roughly 2–3 μm thick) that can be branched or capitate; this is a useful distinction, though there is some overlap. The hymenial gel of Myriospora (and indeed most Acarosporaceae) reacts in iodine in a euamyloid or hemiamyloid manner, but the ascus apex lacks a distinct amyloid tube (i.e. the ascus tip is K/I−). This means that unlike some lichen genera, the Myriospora asci do not have a blue-staining apical ring when treated with KOH and iodine – a trait shared with Acarospora. (Exceptions in the family are those now placed in Caeruleum, which have a K/I+ blue ascus tip, hence their separation.

The asci of Myriospora are club-shaped (clavate) and polysporous, containing dozens of spores. Typically an ascus will have between roughly 50 and 100 spores, and in some species more than 100 may be present. This prolific ascospore production is alluded to by the genus name ("myrio-" = countless). The asci are usually broadly clavate and arise from a basal layer of pseudoamyloid or hemiamyloid tissue (the amyloid reaction of the thallus and hymenium can be complex, but generally the ascus itself lacks an amyloid ring).

The ascospores are colourless, one-celled (simple), and very small. They are usually ellipsoid to roughly spherical (globose) in shape. A typical spore size in Myriospora is on the order of 3–6 × 1.5–3 μm, though some species have slightly larger or smaller spores. For example, M. himalayensis has spores only 1.5–2.5 × 1.0–1.2 μm (quite tiny), whereas M. macrocarpa (if considered part of Myriospora historically) had larger spores up to about 13 × 6 μm. The spores are hyaline, smooth-walled, and lack any septa (they remain unicellular). Given their minute size, they are not usually visible without 400× magnification. Ascospores of Myriospora often number in the hundreds of thousands per apothecium, making this genus an abundant spore producer.

No specialized vegetative propagules (such as soredia or isidia) are reported for Myriospora – the genus reproduces mainly by its ascospores. Conidiomata (pycnidia) may occur as tiny black dot-like structures immersed in the thallus, producing conidiospores, but these are not prominent. When observed, Myriospora conidia are globose to short-rod shaped, very small (about 1–2 μm), and not distinctive. By contrast, species of Trimmatothelopsis consistently form narrow, thread-like conidia 3–7 μm long—another practical marker for separating the two genera.

=== Chemistry ===
Most Myriospora species do not contain abundant secondary metabolites (many will test negative in standard chemical spot tests). However, an important diagnostic trait is the possible presence of norstictic acid in some species. Norstictic acid is a lichen compound that causes a potassium hydroxide spot test to turn K+ red, often with formation of needle-like red crystals. In Myriospora, some species (especially those with rusty-red or orange tints) produce norstictic acid in the medulla or cortex. For instance, M. scabrida and M. tangerina are reported to contain norstictic acid (resulting in red crystals visible in section under polarized light). Other species lack this compound and have no colour reaction (or only a weak yellow reaction) with K. All Myriospora lack usnic acid (hence no yellow-green tint) and lack fatty acids (so C−, P− in most cases). These chemical differences, alongside anatomical traits, help distinguish Myriospora from similar genera.

== Habitat, distribution, and ecology ==
=== Habitat ===
Myriospora species are primarily saxicolous (rock-dwelling) lichens. They grow on a variety of rocky substrates. Most commonly they are found on siliceous rocks – such as granite, schist, quartzite, sandstone – in open, exposed situations. For instance, M. signyensis was found on quartz-mica schist in Antarctica. Some species also occur on calcareous rock (limestone, marble) or basic volcanics, although acidic to neutral rocks are more typical. A few Myriospora can colonize metal-rich rock surfaces: the group has members that tolerate substrates enriched in heavy metals like iron and copper.

Myriospora lichens generally prefer sunny, exposed microhabitats. They are often found on rock faces that receive full sun and experience cycles of drying. Many occur in arid or semi-arid regions (e.g. desert rock varnish communities) as well as alpine zones, indicating a high tolerance for desiccation, high ultraviolet exposure, and temperature extremes. For example, M. himalayensis is reported from high elevations in the Western Himalayas, while M. signyensis endures polar conditions in Antarctica. These lichens are extremophiles to some degree – as crustose forms, they can survive where few other macroscopic organisms can. In general, the Acarosporaceae (including Myriospora) are noted for surviving in harsh environments such as dry alpine rocks, coastal rocks exposed to sea spray, or areas with metal contamination. M. molybdina occupies bird-nutrient-enriched seashore rocks—especially wave-washed, north-facing gneiss or mica-schist ledges—in Arctic coastal zones.

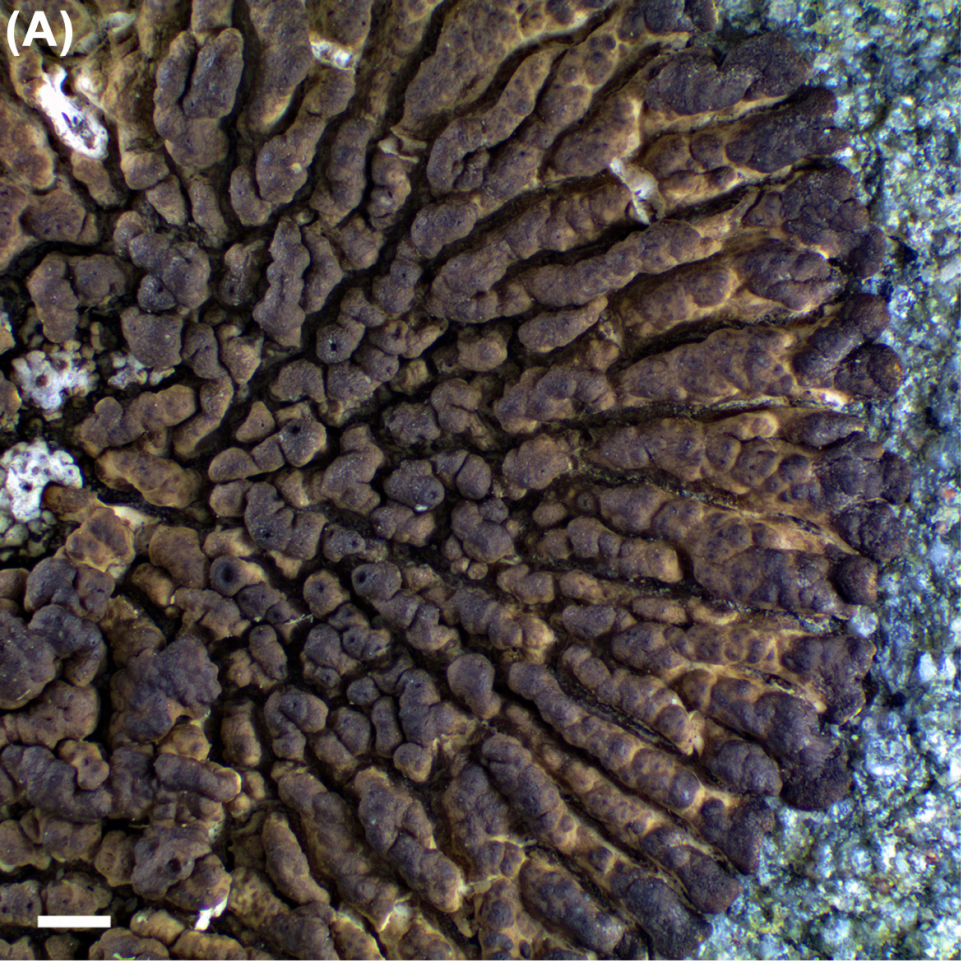
Myriospora molybdina

Besides rock, a few species are terricolous (soil-dwelling) or occur on non-rock substrates. Myriospora myochroa, for instance, grows on soil or plant debris; it has squamules with pale rhizines on the underside to attach to its substrate. This species typically inhabits thin soil over rock or among moss in arid grasslands. Such soil species are less common, but they show that Myriospora can occasionally colonize sandy or clay soils, especially in cold desert or steppe climates. Occurrences on decaying plant matter or on lignum (old wood) are rare but possible for some (in the British Isles, a report of M. dilatata on old fence wood exists, though this is unusual). In nutrient-enriched sites (e.g. bird perching rocks, or near farms), Myriospora may benefit from the added minerals – indeed Acarosporaceae often favour nutrient-rich or eutrophic habitats compared to more fastidious lichens.

=== Distribution ===
Collectively, species of Myriospora are distributed worldwide, though individual species often have more restricted ranges. The genus as a whole has been recorded in North America, Europe, Asia, South America, and even Antarctica. In Europe, Myriospora smaragdula (in the broad sense) is widespread and common on rocks from lowland coasts to mountain tops – it is one of the most frequently encountered members of the group. Several other species (e.g. M. scabrida, M. dilatata) are found in Northern and Central Europe (Scandinavia, British Isles, Alps) on exposed rocky outcrops. In North America, Myriospora is represented in dry western regions and in arctic-alpine zones; M. hassei was originally described from California and occurs in western USA, and M. smaragdula and relatives occur across the continent in suitable habitats. In Asia, the genus is present from the Middle East (North Africa/Mediterranean, e.g. M. tangerina was named from Tangier, Morocco) through Central Asia to the Himalayas and East Asia. Newly discovered M. himalayensis in India extends the known range into the Himalayan biodiversity hotspot. In South America, at least one species (M. westbergii) has been reported from the Galápagos Islands in Ecuador, and M. smaragdula (or a close analog) exists in the Andes and perhaps Patagonia. In polar regions, Myriospora reached Antarctica with the discovery of M. signyensis on Signy Island (South Orkneys) – the first Antarctic record for the genus.

Each Myriospora species tends to have its own ecological niche and range. Some are cosmopolitan (e.g. M. smaragdula in a broad sense), whereas others are narrowly endemic (e.g. M. himalayensis so far known only from a couple of Himalayan localities).

=== Ecology ===
Myriospora lichens are pioneer colonisers on bare rock. They often represent an early stage in primary succession on rock surfaces, initiating biochemical weathering. The hyphae of Myriospora penetrate microscopically into rock pores, helping to break down minerals and create initial soil. In polar and alpine regions, species like M. signyensis contribute to soil formation in freshly deglaciated areas. Their ability to withstand intense sunlight and dry conditions allows them to persist where many other lichens or plants cannot, thus stabilising substrates and capturing wind-blown dust and organic matter. Over time, this activity aids in the development of pockets of soil that can be used by mosses and vascular plants, linking Myriospora to ecosystem succession processes.

Many Myriospora are also involved in nutrient cycling, especially of metals. Some members of the M. smaragdula group actively accumulate iron, copper, and other metals in their thalli, forming mineral deposits (such as orange iron oxides) within the lichen tissues. This bioaccumulation may detoxify the immediate environment and influences microsite chemistry. The presence of Myriospora on metalliferous rocks indicates a role in biogeochemical cycling of metals – an adaptation that has been studied in the context of mine site rehabilitation and metal tolerance in lichens.

In terms of biotic interactions, Myriospora serves as host to certain lichenicolous fungi (fungi that parasitize lichens). With one notable exception, Myriospora species are auto-lichenised. M. hassei can grow as a facultatively lichenicolous lichen, at least in its juvenile stage, parasitising the thallus of Acarospora socialis before developing an independent crust. All other known Myriospora species form their own photobiont-bearing thalli, although they too may host specialised lichenicolous fungi. For example, species of Sarcogyne and Lichenoconium are known to grow on Acarosporaceae thalli. The Acarospora/Myriospora crusts sometimes have black dot-like pycnidia or galls caused by such fungi.

Myriospora species are part of the cryptogamic crust community on rocks. They often coexist with other crustose lichens (like Lecidea, Rhizocarpon, Porpidia, Aspicilia, etc.) and with saxicolous mosses. Their presence indicates certain environmental conditions – they are often indicators of open, dry, unpolluted conditions. In environmental change studies, shifts in the distribution of Myriospora (e.g., colonising new terrain as glaciers retreat, or declining in areas with increased pollution or shade) can provide insights into climate and air quality. Some species, like M. smaragdula, are relatively tolerant of air pollution and nutrient enrichment (nitrophilic), so they may proliferate on nutrient-enriched substrates (bird droppings on rocks, mild eutrophication). Conversely, they are absent from deeply shaded, constantly wet habitats – conditions that favour mosses and other lichen types.

== Species ==
Since its resurrection, the genus has been expanded with new species and new combinations. By 2012, about 11 species were included worldwide. A worldwide key in 2018 recognized 10 species, and subsequent work has added more (e.g. M. himalayensis in 2021 from India, Myriospora molybdina in 2024). Ongoing taxonomic research is refining species boundaries; for instance, the status of Myriospora rufescens (originally included in Myriospora) was re-evaluated, and molecular data showed it actually belongs back in Acarospora (A. anomala). Following the inclusion of the new combination Myriospora molybdina in 2024, Myriospora has 13 species:

- Myriospora bullata K.Knudsen, Kocourk. & Hodková (2021) – Europe
- Myriospora dilatata (M.Westb. & Wedin) K.Knudsen & Arcadia (2012)
- Myriospora fulvoviridula (H.Magn.) Cl.Roux (2014)
- Myriospora hassei (Herre) K.Knudsen & Arcadia (2012)
- Myriospora himalayensis G.K.Mishra, Nayaka & Upreti (2021)
- Myriospora molybdina (Wahlenb.) M.Westb. (2024)
- Myriospora myochroa (M.Westb.) K.Knudsen & Arcadia (2012)
- Myriospora rhagadiza (Nyl.) K.Knudsen & Arcadia (2012)
- Myriospora scabrida (Hedl. ex H.Magn.) K.Knudsen & Arcadia (2012)
- Myriospora signyensis Purvis, Fern.-Brime, M.Westb. & Wedin (2018)
- Myriospora smaragdula (Wahlenb. ex Ach.) Nägeli ex Uloth (1861)
- Myriospora tangerina (M.Westb. & Wedin) K.Knudsen & Arcadia (2012)
- Myriospora westbergii K.Knudsen & Bungartz (2014) – Galápagos

Two species proposed for inclusion in Myriospora have since been transferred to Trimmatothelopsis:

- Myriospora benedarensis (M.Knowles) Cl.Roux (2019) is now Trimmatothelopsis benedarensis
- Myriospora versipellis (Nyl.) K.Knudsen & Arcadia (2012) is now Trimmatothelopsis versipellis
