= Vistasvagge =

Valley near Kiruna, Sweden

Coordinates: 68°01′11″N 18°14′50″E

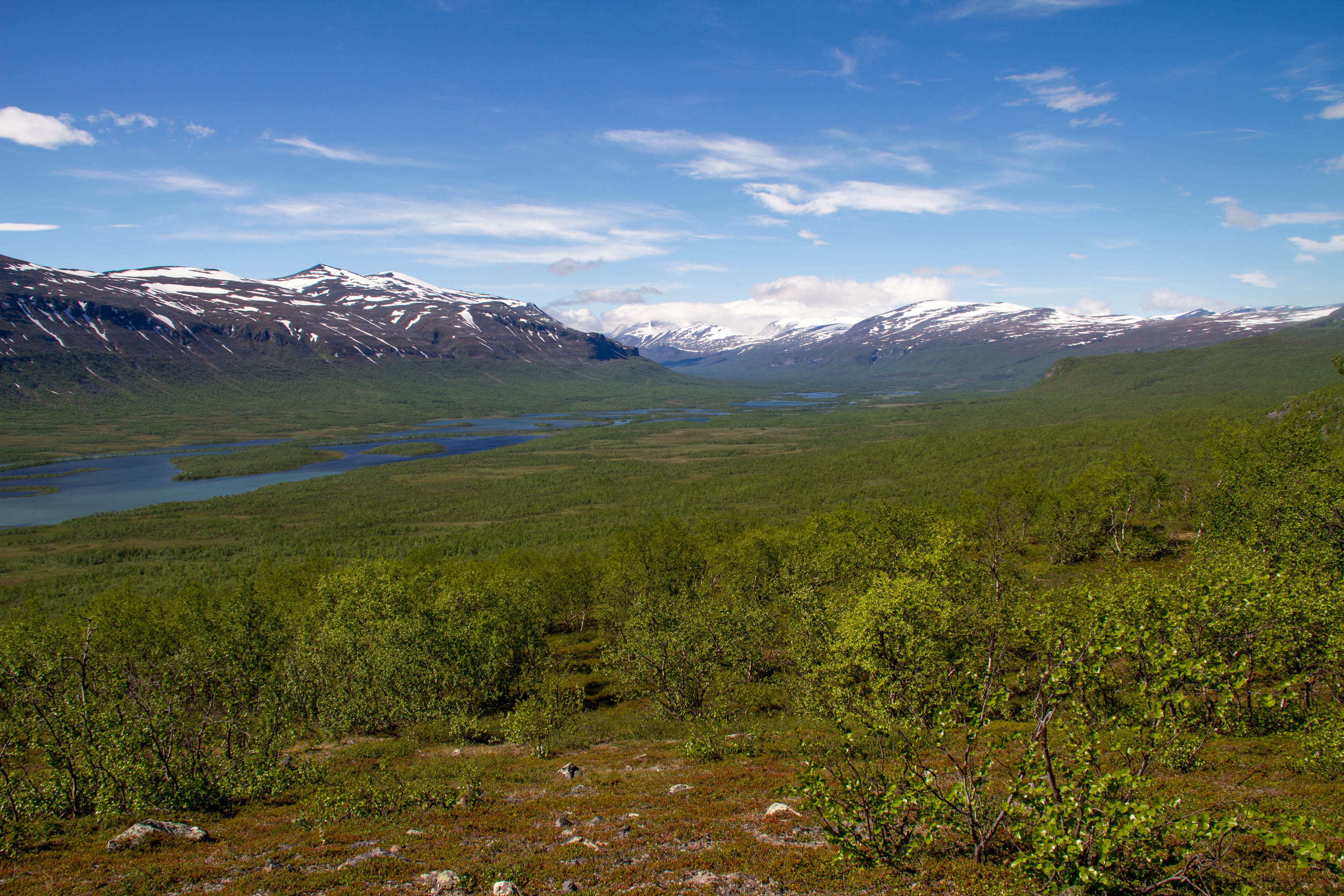
Vistasvagge, seen from the southeast.

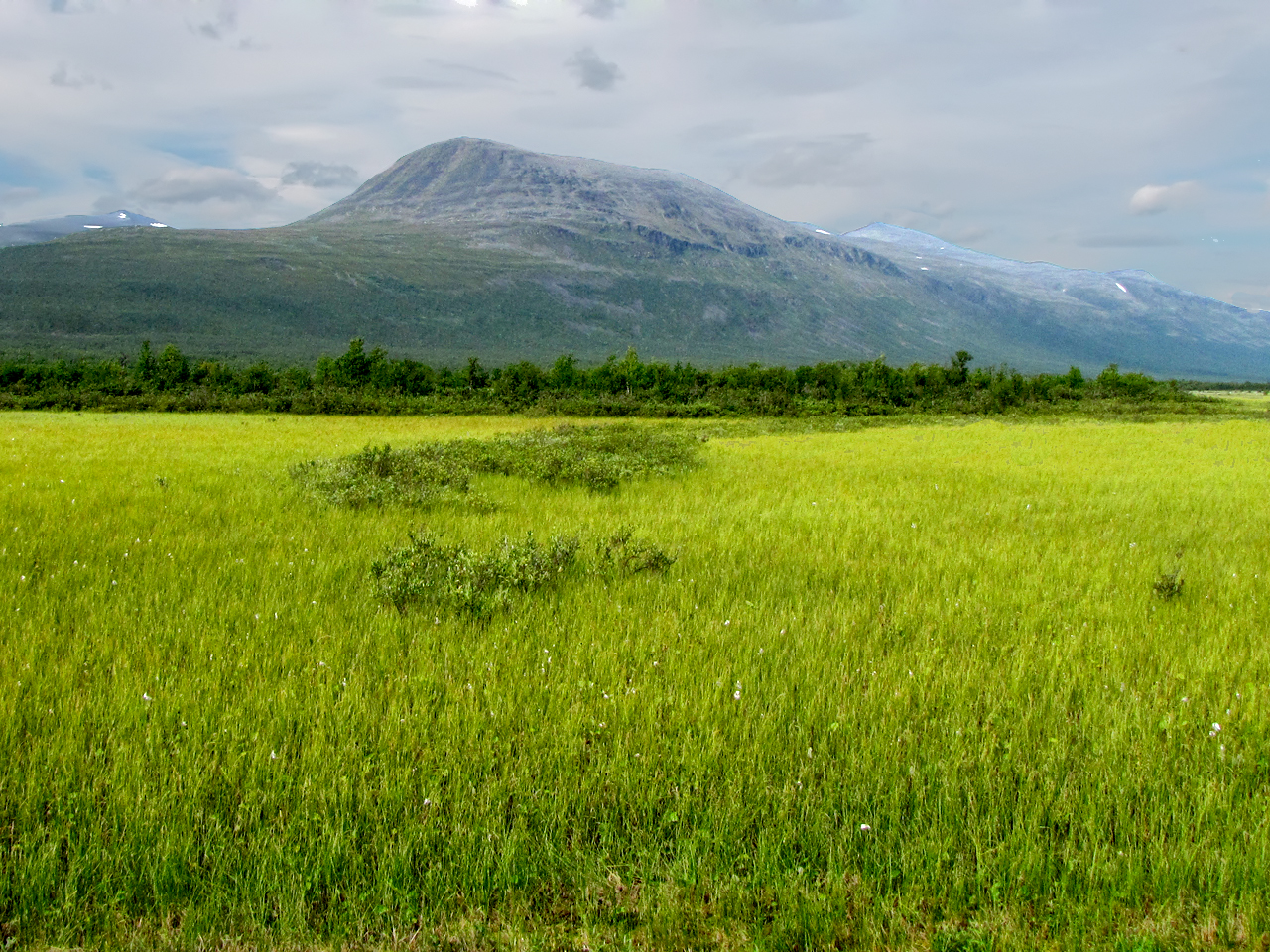
The south portion of Vistasvagge.

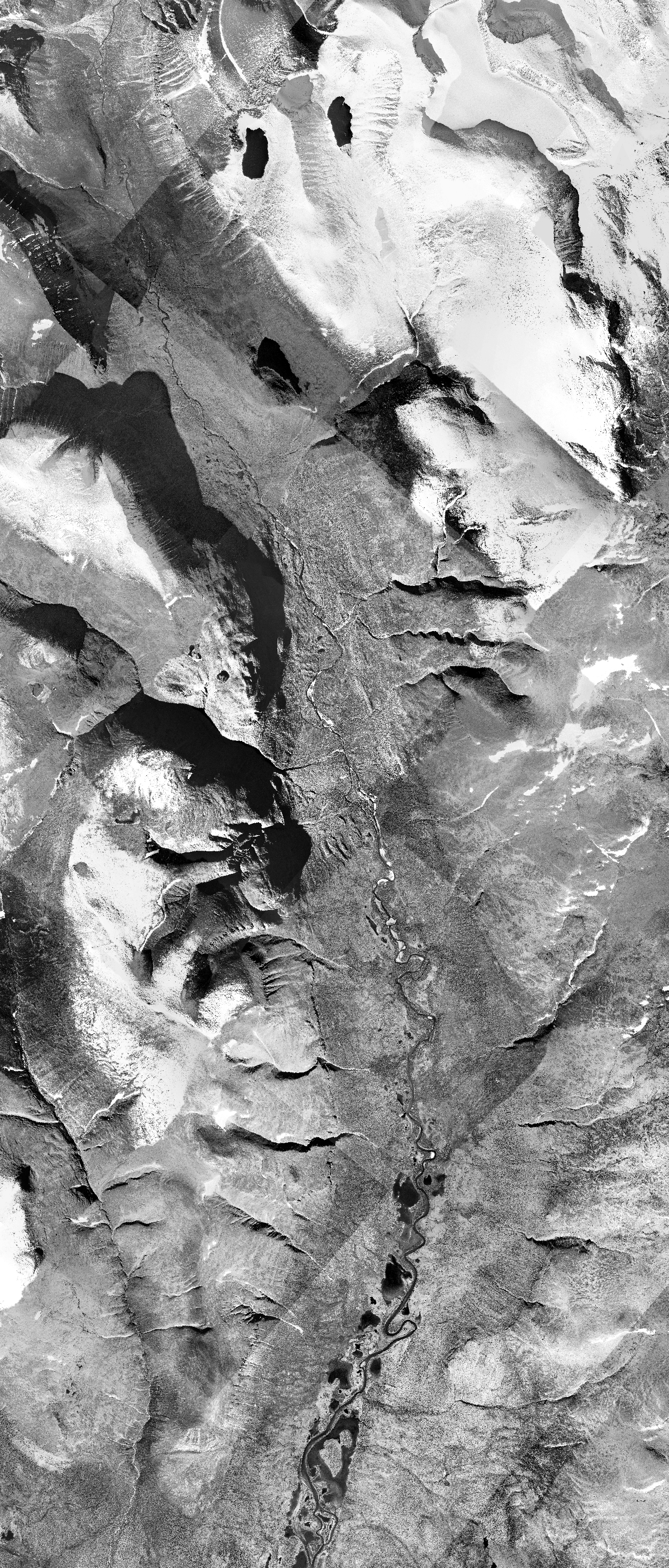
Aerial photo of Vistasvagge, circa 1960.

Vistasvagge (Northern Sami: Visttasvággi) is a valley in the Kebnekaise massif, in the Kiruna Municipality. It extends northwest into Paittasjärvi at Nikkaluokta. The valley continues northwest towards Alesjaure. The Swedish Tourist Association built its first-ever lodge in the Kebnekaise area in this valley.
