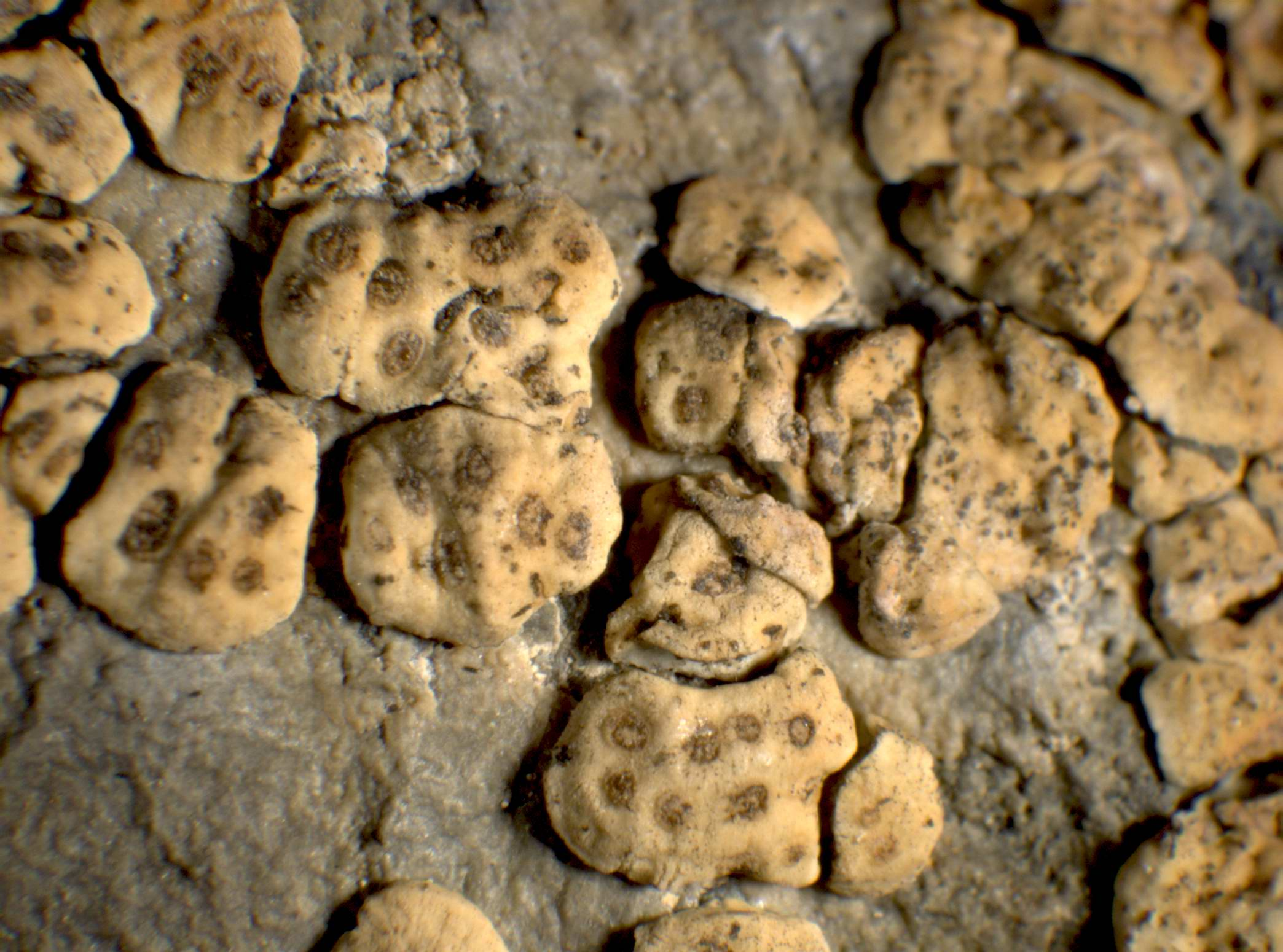

Scientific classification
- Kingdom: Fungi
- Division: Ascomycota
- Class: Lecanoromycetes
- Order: Acarosporales
- Family: Acarosporaceae
- Genus: Myriospora
- Species: M. myochroa

Binomial name
- Myriospora myochroa (M.Westb.) K.Knudsen & Arcadia (2012)

Synonyms
- Silobia myochroa M.Westb. (2010); Trimmatothelopsis myochroa (M.Westb.) Cl.Roux & Nav.-Ros. (2011)

= Myriospora myochroa =

Species of lichen

Myriospora myochroa is a species of crustose lichen in the family Acarosporaceae. It forms distinctive patches that range from whitish-grey to dark brown on silicate rock surfaces. First discovered in Sweden in 2003, this lichen grows in diverse environments from coastal areas affected by sea spray to mountain regions above 2,400 metres in elevation. It prefers sheltered, moisture-retaining habitats such as undercut rock faces and overhangs that provide stable humidity conditions. With a broad Eurasian distribution, M. myochroa has been documented across multiple European countries including Finland, France, Germany, Italy, and Russia, as well as parts of Asia.

== Taxonomy ==
Myriospora myochroa was first described in 2011 by Martin Westberg under the name Silobia myochroa and was based on a specimen collected on 16 September 2003 from the vertical face of a silicate rock at Stocken car park, Orust, Bohuslän, Sweden; this is the holotype that formally defines the species. In 2012, Kerry Knudsen and "Linda in Arcadia" transferred the species to the genus Myriospora, recognising its affinities with other members of that clade. An alternative placement as Trimmatothelopsis myochroa was proposed by Claude Roux and Navarro-Rosinés in 2011, but the name Myriospora myochroa is now widely accepted.

== Description ==
The thallus of Myriospora myochroa grows directly on rock surfaces (epilithic), forming a crust of individual patches (areoles) that may remain separate or merge and lift at the edges into small, scale-like plates (squamules) up to about 4.5 mm across. These patches are typically 1.0–2.4 mm wide (occasionally as small as 0.6 mm) and range in colour from whitish or grey to brownish-grey and even dark brown or black. The surface is mostly uneven and dull, sometimes showing faint, concentric ripples. A thin, often uneven film of dead fungal cells (the epinecral layer), 2–45 micrometre (μm) thick) lies just above the cortex, which itself is 30–60 μm thick and contains scattered groups of crystals. Underneath this layer lies the algal partner and inner fungal tissue. In Baltic collections the cortex usually reacts K+ (yellow) and contains norstictic acid crystals visible under polarised light; the areoles are markedly convex and the apothecial discs uneven.

Reproductive structures (apothecia) occur in groups of one to four (rarely up to fourteen) within each areole. These begin immersed in the thallus before expanding into saucer-shaped discs 0.15–0.70 mm across, flush or slightly sunken relative to the surrounding crust and coloured dark brown. The proper exciple (the rim formed by fungal tissue around the disc) is clear and about 30 μm thick at its base, widening to 90 μm above, while the layer just above the spore sac (the epihymenium) is reddish to dark brown. The hymenium (spore-bearing layer) stands 120–230 μm high and contains unbranched or slightly branched supporting filaments (paraphyses) about 1–1.5 μm thick, with tips up to 2 μm wide. Asci (spore sacs) reach 120 × 22 μm and release narrowly ellipsoid ascospores measuring roughly 3–5 × 1–1.5 μm. Asexual fruiting bodies (pycnidia) are rare; when present, they produce tiny ellipsoid conidia around 2 × 1 μm. Chemical spot tests are generally negative, although fresh thalli often show a yellow mist on addition of potassium hydroxide solution (K+) and about half of samples contain trace norstictic acid detectable by high-performance thin-layer chromatography.

== Habitat and distribution ==
Myriospora myochroa specialises on silicate rocks, particularly favouring undercut or overhanging surfaces where moisture is retained. It tolerates a wide elevational range, from sea-level coastal outcrops subjected to sea spray through to montane exposures above 2,400 m. The species has a broad Eurasian distribution, with verified records from Asia and Europe, including the Czech Republic, Finland, France, Germany, Italy, Norway, Poland, Russia (Siberia) and Sweden. In coastal settings it often inhabits the splash zone where waves deposit salt-laden moisture, while inland it is typically found on shaded rock overhangs that provide stable humidity and protection from direct precipitation.

== Habitat and distribution ==
Myriospora myochroa is firmly saxicolous, growing almost exclusively on siliceous substrates. Throughout its range it frequents sheltered, moisture-retaining microhabitats such as undercut faces, shallow caves and overhanging ledges, but it also persists on fully exposed boulders where the rock retains enough surface water to prevent desiccation. In the Baltic coastal zone of Germany the species is most abundant in the epilittoral belt (entirely above the normal water level and never submerged by water), colonising wave-washed granite or gneiss blocks that form beaches, harbour walls and rip-rap sea defences. Here it tolerates full sun, salt spray and localised nutrient enrichment, often forming a discontinuous grey-brown crust just above the zone dominated by the better-adapted M. rhagadiza. Away from the shore it is reported on megalithic tombs and historic churchyard masonry where exposure is more moderate, and—very rarely—on mortar within inland settlements, indicating a broad ecological amplitude so long as the substrate is silica-rich and minimally shaded.

The species shows a wide but patchily recorded Eurasian distribution, extending from coastal Scandinavia through temperate and montane Europe into Siberia and parts of central Asia. Within Germany two main centres are now documented: a Schleswig-Holstein cluster stretching from Flensburger Förde to Eckernförder Bucht, and a second focus on the Isle of Rügen; the intervening coastline is thought to be under-surveyed rather than genuinely devoid of the lichen. Whereas many continental records lie well above 2,000 m, the Baltic occurrences sit almost at sea level, showing the species' capacity to occupy both high-altitude and salt-influenced low-altitude niches.
