= Övre Soppero =

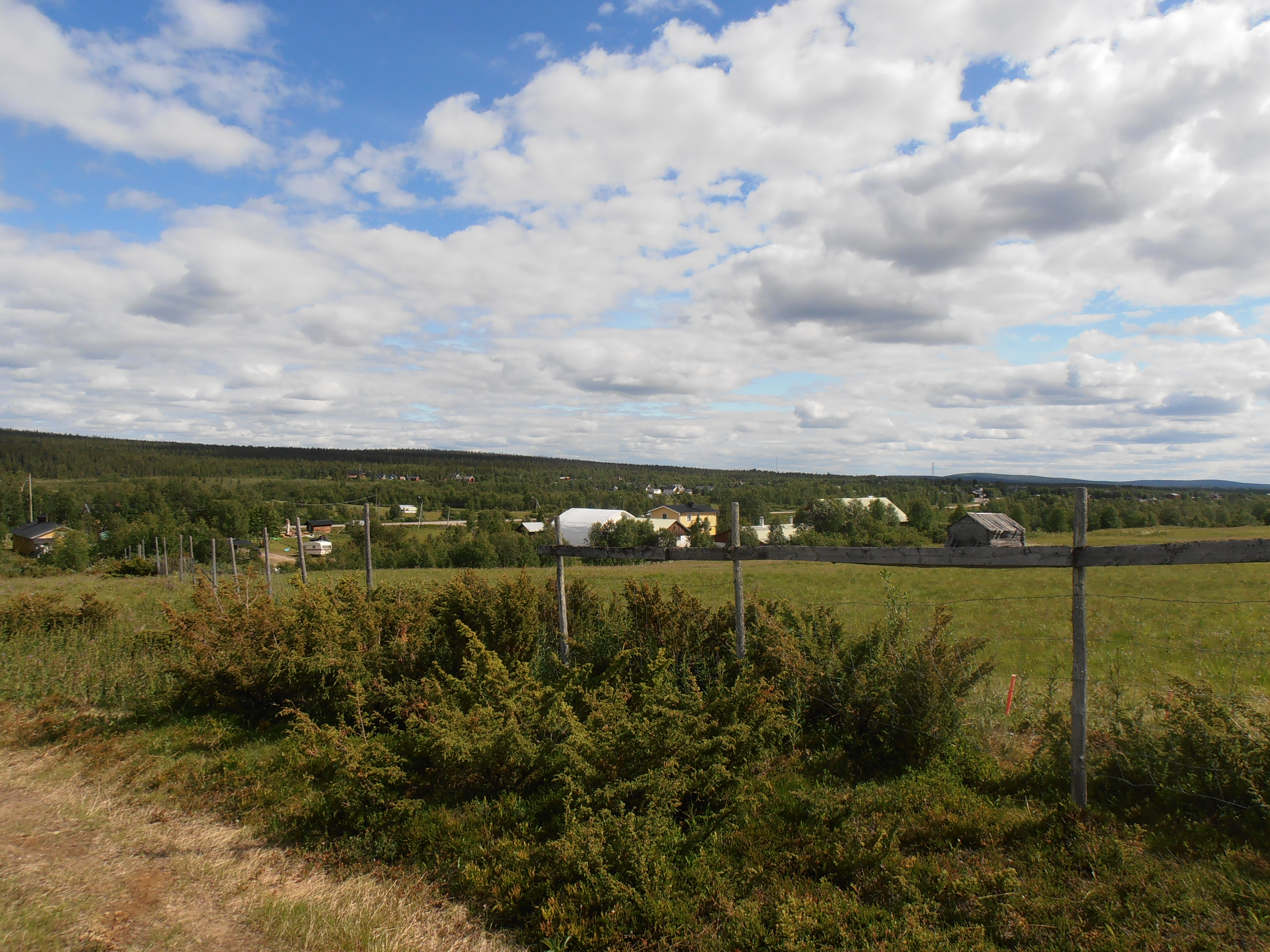

- Location within Norrbotten Location within Sweden
- Coordinates: 68°05′N 21°42′E
- Country: Sweden
- Province: Lapland
- County: Norrbotten County
- Municipality: Kiruna Municipality

Area
  - Total: 1.33 km^{2} (0.51 sq mi)

Population (31 December 2010)
  - Total: 201
  - Density: 151/km^{2} (390/sq mi)
- Time zone: UTC+1 (CET)
  - Summer (DST): UTC+2 (CEST)

Övre Soppero (Swedish pronunciation: [ˈø̌ːvrɛ ˈsɔ̌pːɛrɔ]; Meänkieli: Yli-Soppero; Northern Sámi: Badje Sohppar) is a locality situated in Kiruna Municipality, Norrbotten County, Sweden with 201 inhabitants in 2010.

== Climate ==
Climate data for Nedre Soppero V 1991−2020 (355m)
Month	Jan	Feb	Mar	Apr	May	Jun	Jul	Aug	Sep	Oct	Nov	Dec	Year
Record high °C (°F)	6.8 (44.2)	6.7 (44.1)	9.8 (49.6)	15.8 (60.4)	27.6 (81.7)	29.8 (85.6)	28.7 (83.7)	27.4 (81.3)	21.5 (70.7)	12.5 (54.5)	8.1 (46.6)	6.5 (43.7)	29.8 (85.6)
Mean daily maximum °C (°F)	−8.9 (16.0)	−8.2 (17.2)	−3.0 (26.6)	2.4 (36.3)	8.4 (47.1)	14.7 (58.5)	18.2 (64.8)	15.7 (60.3)	10.0 (50.0)	1.9 (35.4)	−4.5 (23.9)	−6.8 (19.8)	3.3 (38.0)
Daily mean °C (°F)	−13.7 (7.3)	−13.1 (8.4)	−8.1 (17.4)	−2.0 (28.4)	4.3 (39.7)	10.6 (51.1)	13.8 (56.8)	11.4 (52.5)	6.1 (43.0)	−1.2 (29.8)	−8.2 (17.2)	−11.4 (11.5)	−1.0 (30.3)
Mean daily minimum °C (°F)	−19.3 (−2.7)	−18.9 (−2.0)	−14.3 (6.3)	−7.5 (18.5)	−0.2 (31.6)	6.2 (43.2)	9.5 (49.1)	7.2 (45.0)	2.7 (36.9)	−4.2 (24.4)	−12.5 (9.5)	−16.5 (2.3)	−5.6 (21.8)
Record low °C (°F)	−48.9 (−56.0)	−42.6 (−44.7)	−39.9 (−39.8)	−32.7 (−26.9)	−19.3 (−2.7)	−1.1 (30.0)	2.3 (36.1)	−1.8 (28.8)	−7.9 (17.8)	−22.8 (−9.0)	−34.3 (−29.7)	−39.1 (−38.4)	−48.9 (−56.0)
Average precipitation mm (inches)	27.5 (1.08)	23.0 (0.91)	21.6 (0.85)	21.6 (0.85)	39.5 (1.56)	59.5 (2.34)	81.0 (3.19)	67.6 (2.66)	47.4 (1.87)	37.8 (1.49)	35.3 (1.39)	32.9 (1.30)	494.6 (19.47)
Source: SMHI
