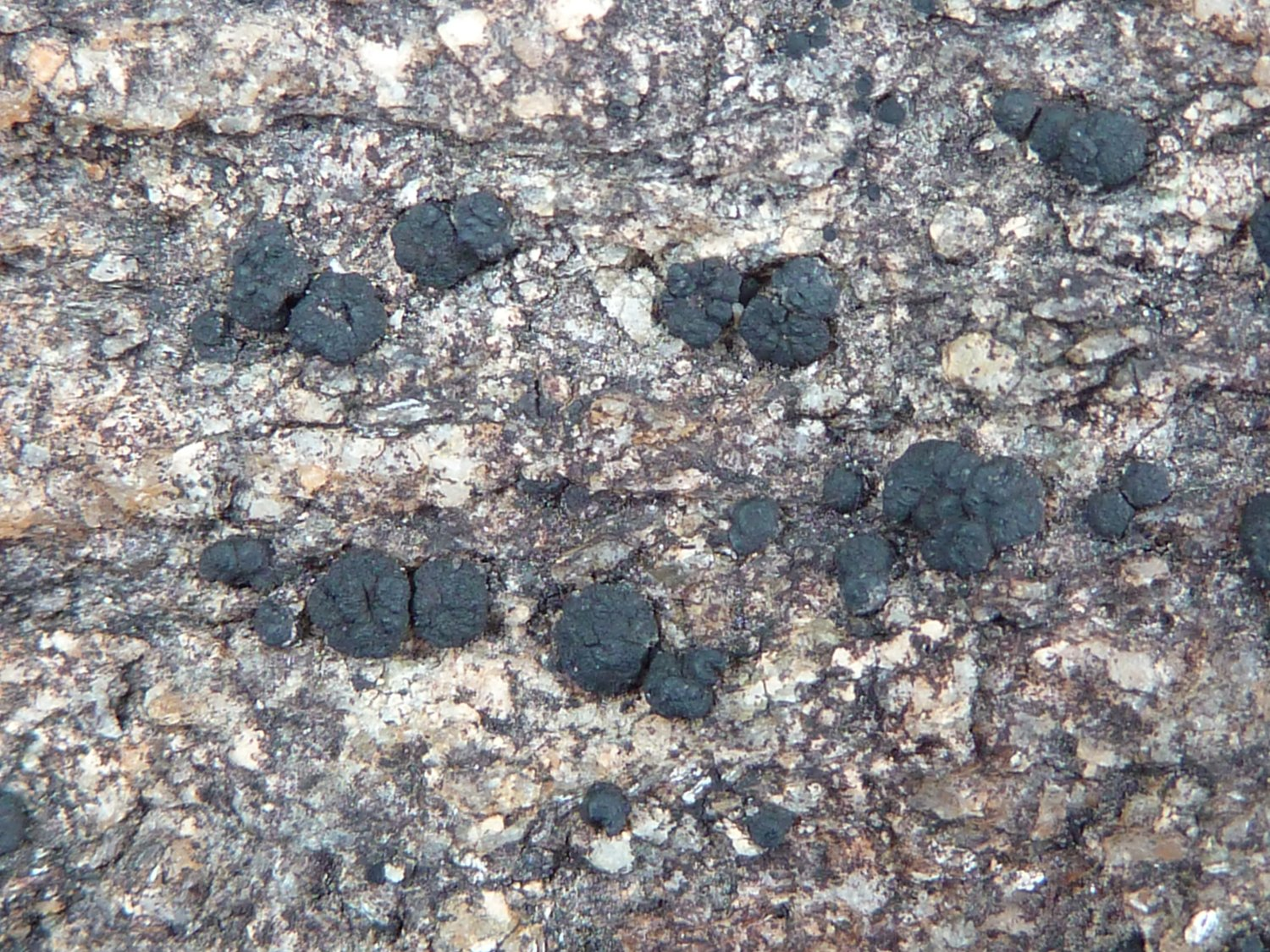
- Trimmatothelopsis versipellis

Scientific classification
- Kingdom: Fungi
- Division: Ascomycota
- Class: Lecanoromycetes
- Order: Acarosporales
- Family: Acarosporaceae
- Genus: Trimmatothelopsis; Zschacke (1934)

Type species
- Trimmatothelopsis versipellis (Nyl.) Zschacke (1934)

Synonyms
- Thelocarpella Nav.-Ros. & Cl.Roux (1999)

= Trimmatothelopsis =

Genus of lichens

Trimmatothelopsis is a genus of lichen-forming fungi in the family Acarosporaceae.

== Species ==
- Trimmatothelopsis americana (K.Knudsen & Lendemer) K.Knudsen & Lendemer (2016)
- Trimmatothelopsis benedarensis (M.Knowles) K.Knudsen & Kocourk. (2021)
- Trimmatothelopsis coreana (S.Y.Kondr., Lőkös & Hur) K.Knudsen & Lendemer (2016)
- Trimmatothelopsis dispersa (H.Magn.) K.Knudsen & Lendemer (2016)
- Trimmatothelopsis gordensis (Nav.-Ros. & Cl.Roux) K.Knudsen & Lendemer (2016)
- Trimmatothelopsis montana (P.M.McCarthy) K.Knudsen & Lendemer (2016)
- Trimmatothelopsis oreophila (K.Knudsen) K.Knudsen, Kocourk., Hodková & Y.Wang (2021)
- Trimmatothelopsis rhizobola (Nyl.) K.Knudsen & Lendemer (2016)
- Trimmatothelopsis sphaerosperma (R.C.Harris & K.Knudsen) K.Knudsen & Kocourk. (2021)
- Trimmatothelopsis terricola (H.Magn.) K.Knudsen & Lendemer (2016)
- Trimmatothelopsis versipellis (Nyl.) Zschacke (1934)
