= Kiruna Municipality =

Kiruna Municipality Kiruna kommun (Swedish) Girona gielda (Northern Sami) Kierunan kunta (Meänkieli) Kiirunan kunta (Finnish)
- Municipality
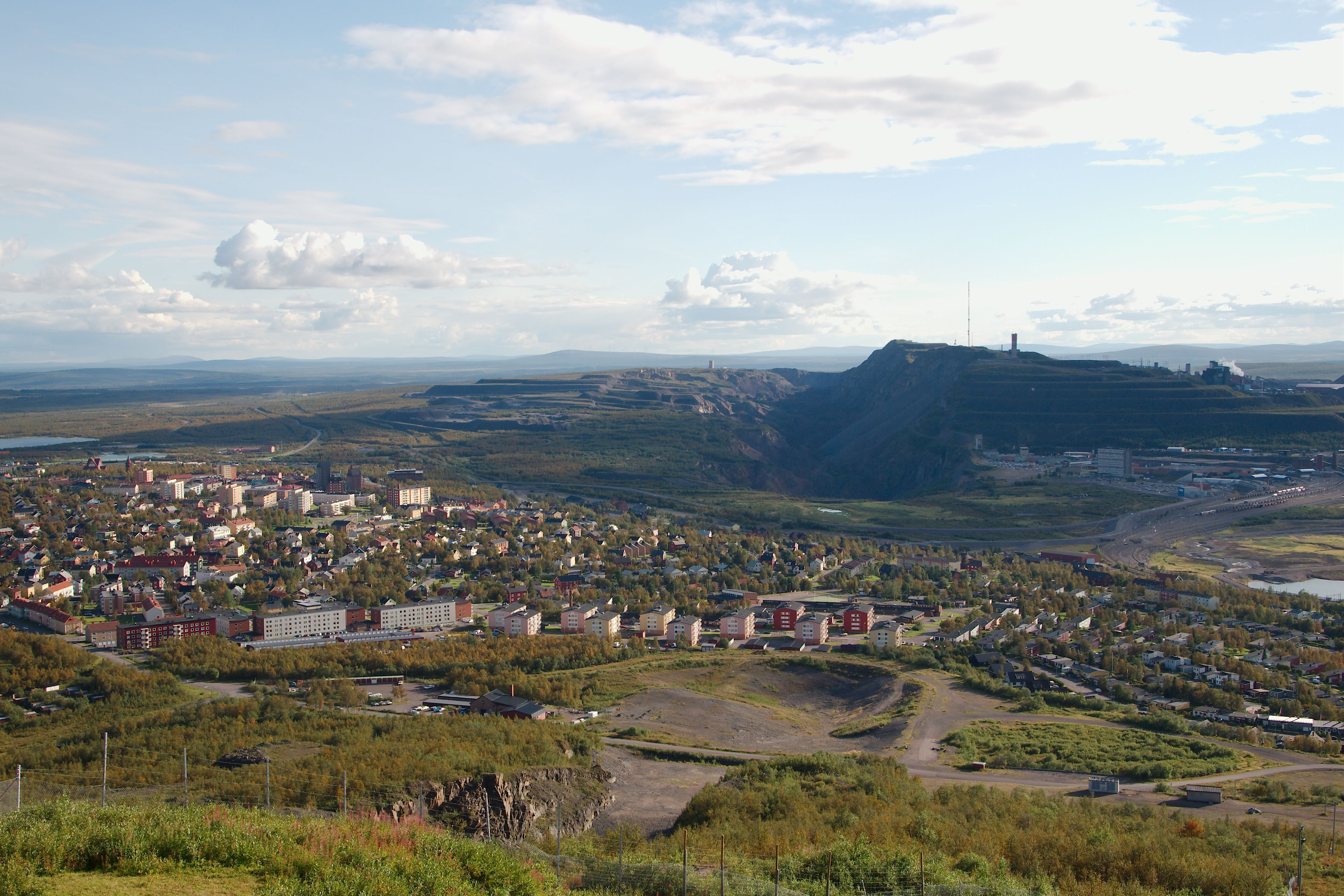

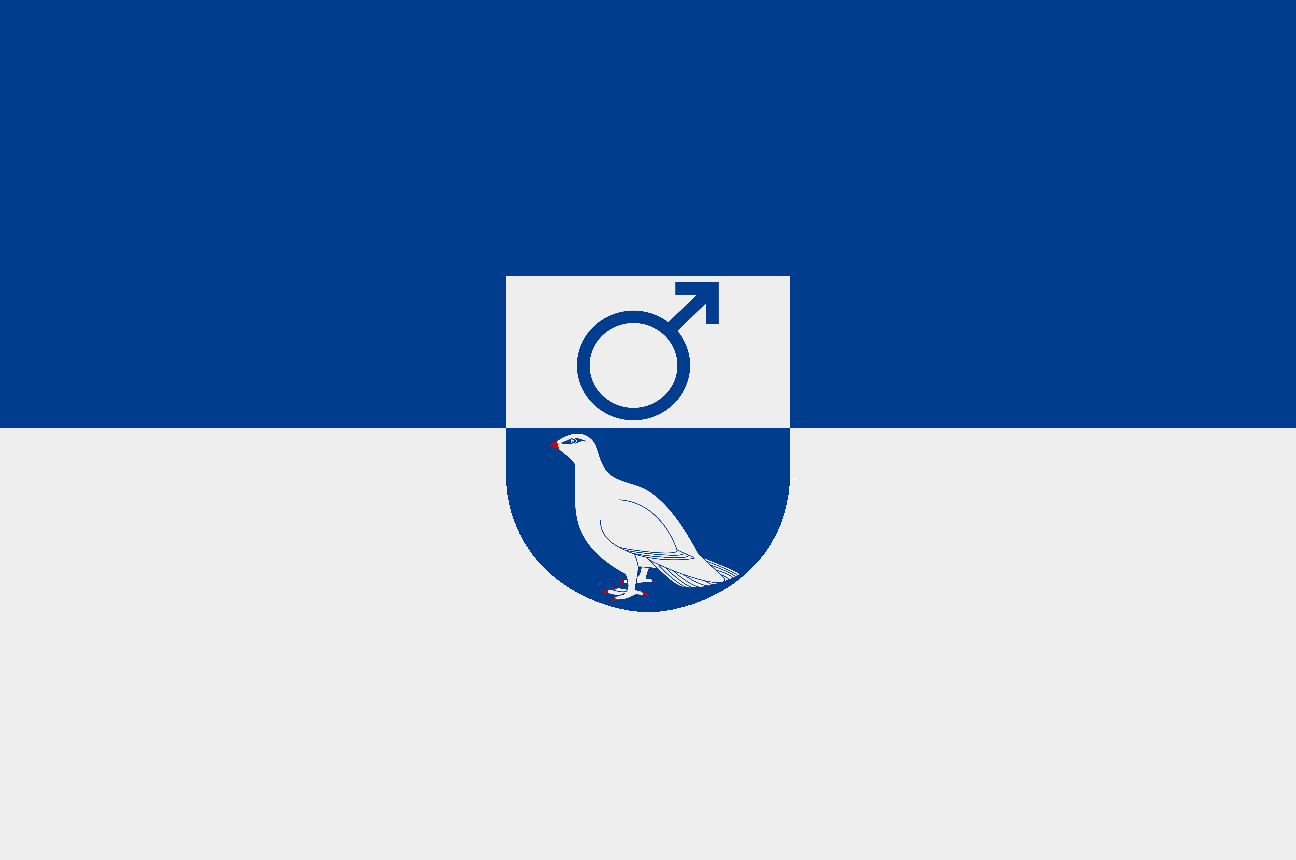
- Flag Coat of arms

- Coordinates: 67°51′N 020°13′E
- Country: Sweden
- County: Norrbotten County
- Seat: Kiruna

Area
  - Total: 20,551.42 km^{2} (7,934.95 sq mi)
  - Land: 19,140.33 km^{2} (7,390.12 sq mi)
  - Water: 1,411.09 km^{2} (544.82 sq mi)
- Area as of 1 January 2014.

Population (30 June 2025)
  - Total: 22,454
  - Density: 1.1731/km^{2} (3.0384/sq mi)
- Time zone: UTC+1 (CET)
  - Summer (DST): UTC+2 (CEST)
- ISO 3166 code: SE
- Province: Lapland
- Municipal code: 2584
- Website: www.kiruna.se

Kiruna Municipality (Swedish: Kiruna kommun; Northern Sami: Girona gielda; Meänkieli: Kierunan kunta; Finnish: Kiirunan kunta) is a municipality in Norrbotten County in northernmost Sweden. Its seat is located in Kiruna. It is the northernmost municipality in Sweden, and at 20,715 square kilometres (7,998 sq mi) is Sweden's geographically largest covering roughly 4.604% of its total area. Finnish, Meänkieli and Sami have the official status of being minority languages in the municipality.

== History ==
During the 20th century, the mining settlement Kiruna was built in the parish of Jukkasjärvi, at that time a rural municipality in very remote territory. A so-called municipalsamhälle (which was a kind of borough established within a rural municipality to take care of some matters of urban character) was instituted in 1908. The settlement grew (it even had a tramway system) and it was decided to make it a city.

On 1 January 1948, the whole parish of Jukkasjärvi was transformed into the City of Kiruna. As the vast wilderness around the town itself was included, Kiruna was at that time regarded as the largest city municipality in the world. Only a few more cities were instituted in Sweden, the last one in 1951. Instead the differences between the three types of municipalities were diminished and finally abolished altogether. In 1971, Kiruna, as all others, became a unitary municipality and at the same time merged with Karesuando.

== Geography ==
Kebnekaise is Sweden's and Sápmi's highest mountain at 2,097 meters above mean sea level. There are more than 6,000 lakes in Kiruna municipality, Lake Torneträsk being the largest. Seven rivers run through the municipality, named Kalix River, Torne River, Lainio River, Rautas River and Vittangi River, as well as Könkämä River and Muonio River which mark the border to Finland. The untouched geography has also been noted with the establishment of Abisko National Park, by the Norwegian border, established as early as 1909.

=== Localities ===
There are seven localities (or urban areas) in Kiruna Municipality:

#	Locality	Population
1	**Kiruna**	18,154
2	Vittangi	789
3	Jukkasjärvi	519
4	Svappavaara	394
5	Kuttainen	364
6	Karesuando	313
7	Övre Soppero	220

The municipal seat in bold

== Demographics ==
Historical population
Year	Pop.	±%
1810	1,408	—
1820	1,621	+15.1%
1830	1,763	+8.8%
1840	2,021	+14.6%
1850	2,357	+16.6%
1860	2,989	+26.8%
1870	3,147	+5.3%
1880	3,266	+3.8%
1890	3,604	+10.3%
1900	4,314	+19.7%
1910	12,728	+195.0%
1920	14,783	+16.1%
1930	19,661	+33.0%
1940	19,427	−1.2%
1950	20,348	+4.7%
1960	28,194	+38.6%
1970	30,623	+8.6%
1980	29,705	−3.0%
1990	26,149	−12.0%
2000	24,314	−7.0%
2010	22,944	−5.6%
2020	22,664	−1.2%

This is a demographic table based on Kiruna Municipality's electoral districts in the 2022 Swedish general election sourced from SVT's election platform, in turn taken from SCB official statistics.

In total there were 22,528 residents, including 16,910 Swedish citizens of voting age resident in the municipality. 56.7% voted for the left coalition and 41.8% for the right coalition. Indicators are in percentage points except population totals and income. Kiruna has high general incomes for an isolated municipality in northern Sweden, mainly as a result of the vast mining industry.

Location	Residents	Citizen adults	Left vote	Right vote	Employed	Swedish parents	Foreign heritage	Income SEK	Degree
Location			%	%					
Bolaget-Triangeln	1,642	1,315	60.5	38.5	86	86	14	29,391	30
Högalid-Sandstensberget	2,263	1,768	56.3	42.3	86	84	16	30,820	36
Jukkasjärvi	1,531	1,065	44.6	53.2	86	89	11	32,124	29
Kiruna C	1,439	803	61.9	35.9	84	71	29	27,337	36
Kiruna NO	1,132	891	55.9	39.9	85	86	14	21,361	23
Kiruna SO	1,456	1,138	62.1	37.3	85	82	18	25,809	22
Lombolo M	1,622	1,111	58.9	40.7	90	91	9	33,208	32
Lombolo V	1,587	1,142	53.2	44.4	82	79	21	24,516	21
Lombolo Ö	2,481	1,712	55.3	43.5	88	87	13	30,451	31
Luossavaara-Abisko	1,741	1,397	64.9	34.1	87	85	15	30,269	40
Tuolluvaara-Kurravaara	2,302	1,653	53.4	45.3	86	88	12	33,387	32
Östermalm	1,261	1,118	56.4	42.1	80	84	16	27,730	34
Övre Norrmalm	2,071	1,797	58.3	40.2	86	83	17	30,998	35
Source: SVT

== Elections ==
=== Riksdag ===
These are the results of the elections to the Riksdag for Kiruna Municipality since the 1972 municipal reform. Norrbotten Party also contested the 1994 election but due to the party's small size at a nationwide level SCB did not publish the party's results at a municipal level. The same applies to the Sweden Democrats between 1988 and 1998. "Turnout" denotes the percentage of eligible voters casting any ballots, whereas "Votes" denotes the number of actual valid ballots cast.

Year	Turnout	Votes	V	S	MP	C	L	KD	M	SD	ND	NP/SP
1973	83.5	15,875	19.9	52.2	0.0	12.8	6.6	1.3	6.6	0.0	0.0	0.0
1976	85.1	17,083	15.8	56.8	0.0	12.2	7.0	1.1	6.5	0.0	0.0	0.0
1979	86.2	17,283	14.6	58.7	0.0	7.3	6.3	1.3	8.8	0.0	0.0	0.0
1982	87.9	17,626	15.5	62.7	0.9	5.4	2.6	1.3	10.0	0.0	0.0	0.0
1985	84.9	16,597	16.2	60.9	0.7	4.8	6.9	0.0	9.0	0.0	0.0	0.0
1988	79.1	15,308	16.2	60.7	2.9	3.7	6.3	1.7	7.3	0.0	0.0	0.0
1991	80.1	15,373	14.1	58.2	1.9	2.9	5.8	3.5	9.9	0.0	2.8	0.0
1994	84.5	16,299	19.2	58.6	3.6	2.0	3.6	2.0	9.2	0.0	0.3	0.0
1998	78.4	14,566	27.2	49.2	2.8	1.2	2.2	5.1	10.7	0.0	0.0	0.0
2002	77.5	13,709	14.8	40.9	5.2	1.9	4.1	3.8	4.4	0.0	0.0	23.5
2006	78.8	13,762	15.0	51.8	3.7	3.3	3.2	3.9	9.5	2.4	0.0	3.9
2010	82.3	14,535	14.0	51.7	5.2	2.6	3.2	3.2	13.2	5.7	0.0	0.0
2014	84.3	14,964	11.6	47.4	5.2	3.0	2.3	3.4	10.3	13.2	0.0	0.0
2018	85.8	14,796	13.5	38.2	2.8	5.4	2.5	4.9	10.7	19.7	0.0	0.0

Blocs

This lists the relative strength of the socialist and center-right blocs since 1973, but parties not elected to the Riksdag are inserted as "other", including the Sweden Democrats results from 1988 to 2006, but also the Christian Democrats pre-1991 and the Greens in 1982, 1985 and 1991. The sources are identical to the table above. The coalition or government mandate marked in bold formed the government after the election. New Democracy got elected in 1991 but are still listed as "other" due to the short lifespan of the party.

Year	Turnout	Votes	Left	Right	SD	Other	Elected
1973	83.5	15,875	**72.1**	26.0	0.0	1.9	98.1
1976	85.1	17,083	72.6	**25.7**	0.0	1.9	98.1
1979	86.2	17,283	73.3	**22.4**	0.0	4.3	95.7
1982	87.9	17,626	**78.2**	18.0	0.0	3.8	96.2
1985	84.9	16,597	**77.1**	20.7	0.0	2.2	97.8
1988	79.1	15,308	**79.8**	17.3	0.0	2.9	97.1
1991	80.1	15,373	73.0	**22.1**	0.0	4.9	95.1
1994	84.5	16,299	**81.4**	16.8	0.0	1.8	98.2
1998	78.4	14,566	**79.2**	19.2	0.0	1.6	98.4
2002	77.5	13,709	**60.9**	14.2	0.0	24.9	75.1
2006	78.8	13,762	70.5	**19.9**	0.0	8.4	91.4
2010	82.3	14,535	70.9	**22.2**	5.7	1.2	98.8
2014	84.3	14,964	**64.2**	19.0	13.2	3.6	96.4
2018	85.8	14,796	**54.5**	23.5	19.7	2.3	97.7

== Former sister city ==
Kiruna Municipality had one sister city:

- Arkhangelsk, Russia (1999–2022)

== Notable native ==
- Börje Salming, Swedish ice hockey player
