= Gustaf Einar Du Rietz =

Swedish biologist

Gustaf Einar du Rietz
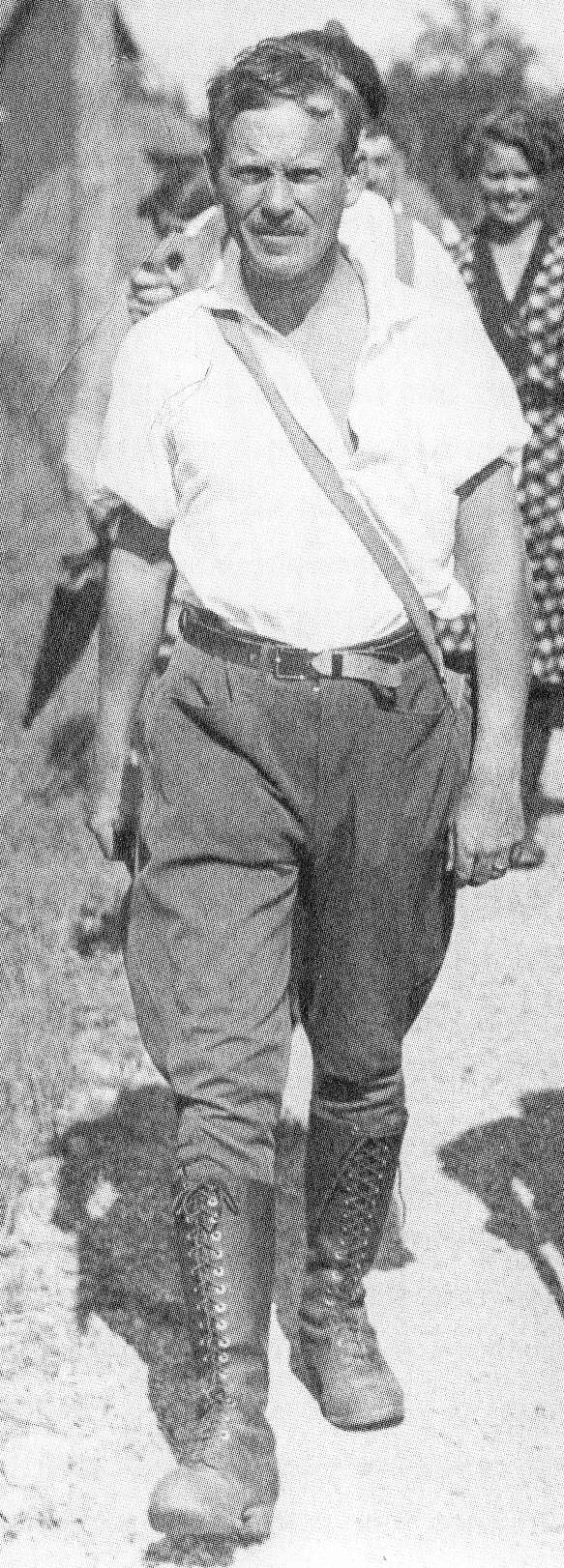
- Einar Du Rietz in 1932
- Born: 25 April 1895; Bromma
- Died: 7 March 1967 (aged 71); Uppsala
- Education: Uppsala University
- Spouse(s): Greta Sernander, divorced 1951;Margareta Witting
- Children: 4
- Scientific career
- Fields: Lichenology, phytosociology
- Workplaces: Uppsala University
- Author abbrev. (botany): Du Rietz

Gustaf Einar Du Rietz (25 April 1895 – 7 March 1967) was a Swedish botanist and lichenologist. His research interests included plant ecology, lichen taxonomy, and biogeography. He was a leading figure in the Uppsala school of phytosociology–the study of groups of species of plants that are usually found together–and is recognised for his role in advancing this field of science and for mentoring future lichenologists. He led the Swedish Australasian Botanical Expedition of 1926–27, a seven-month research tour of various locations. He was married to Greta Sernander, who was also a lichenologist. During the expedition, Du Rietz and his wife researched the vegetation in New Zealand, Australia, and Java, focusing on mountain lichens and their potential as bioindicators for environmental conditions. They collected around 3000 specimens, contributing significantly to the study of bipolar lichens and forest ecology, despite challenges in processing all the samples upon return to Sweden. Several species have been named in his honour. In 1949, Du Rietz was elected to the Royal Swedish Academy of Sciences and contributed significantly to nature conservation efforts in Sweden.

== Early life and education ==
Gustaf Einar Du Rietz was born in Bromma on 25 April 1895. He was the second son of the CEO of Stockholms Benmjölsfabrik AB, the engineer Hjalmar Du Rietz and Charlotta Sofia Mathilda (born Kullman). His younger brother, Carl Du Rietz, pursued a career as a high school teacher. Du Rietz finished grade school in 1912, and became a Filosofie kandidat in 1917.

Du Rietz graduated with a licentiate degree from Uppsala University in 1921, and received an associate professorship the same year. His thesis was titled Zur methodologischen Grundlage der modernen Pflanzensoziologie ('Fundamental Methods of Plant Sociology'). In 1922 Du Rietz was awarded a PhD for his work.

== Academic career ==
One of Du Rietz's professors at Uppsala University was Rutger Sernander, a popular lecturer who pioneered the study of plant ecology at the institution. One of Du Rietz's earliest publication was on the material collected by Sernander in Norway. Du Rietz later continued Sernander's work. From 1917 to 1923, Du Rietz served as an associate assistant professor at the Department of Plant Biology. He then transitioned to the role of curator at the Botanical Museum in Uppsala, a position he held from 1924 to 1927. Du Rietz was also the leader of the biological geological work at Abisko Scientific Research Station, and general secretary of the international plant geographical excursion through Scandinavia in 1925. Du Rietz undertook several study trips within and outside Sweden, scientific expeditions to New Zealand and Australia and in his research mainly devoted on plant sociology and lichenology. In 1929 he co-founded the Svenska Växtgeografiska Sällskapet ('Swedish Phytogeographical Society').

Having been a docent since 1921, in 1934 Du Rietz was appointed as both professor of plant ecology at Uppsala University (emeritus in the early 1960s), and as the director of the institute. He had served temporarily in this latter position since Sernander's retirement in November 1931. Sernander established the "Uppsala school", known for treating plant communities as tangible entities rather than abstract constructs and for advocating an empirical, inductive approach that emphasised life forms, stratification, dominance, and the significance of smaller non-flowering plants and fungi (cryptogams). This approach was primarily analytical, focusing on the analysis, characterisation, and classification of vegetation independently of habitat factors, which were to be considered subsequently. Du Rietz would later carry on the research traditions of the "Uppsala school". Du Rietz taught high-level material without being difficult to understand, and became popular among botany students. Under his supervision, the plant biology seminar flourished. According to his biographer, the Swedish plant ecologist Hugo Sjörs, Du Rietz was regarded as an inspiring academic teacher. A few of his students, Sten Ahlner, Gunnar Degelius, Torsten Hasselrot, and Rolf Santesson, later became notable lichenologists. Stig Waldheim and Ove Almborn were also influenced by the Uppsala school of phytogeography even though they were associated with Lund University.

After this phase of his career, Du Rietz started researching the plant genus Euphrasia (eyebrights), both local and foreign species.

== Personal ==
In 1924, Du Rietz married Greta Sernander, daughter of Rutger Sernander. He later remarried Margareta Witting, one of his former students. She studied the chemistry of bog water; Du Rietz would sometimes hand-squeeze microalgae out of moss and bring it to her in tubes for study.

Du Rietz died of a heart attack in Uppsala on 7 March 1967, at the age of 72. He was outdoors, walking on his way to work.

== Swedish–Australasian botanical expedition ==
In 1926–27, Du Rietz and his wife conducted a research trip to New Zealand, including its sub-Antarctic islands, with visits to a large part of Australia and Java. The purpose of trip, known as the Swedish Australasian Botanical Expedition, was to compare vegetation across the visited countries. One of Du Rietz's research objectives was to determine whether a detailed study of mountain lichens could increase the recognised Arctic elements within New Zealand's flora. He also aimed to evaluate whether certain lichens could serve as bioindicators for assessing forest humidity levels. This research intended to identify which forest tree species could replenish areas cleared by sawmilling, the fear of a possible wood shortage was an environmental concern causing widespread anxiety in New Zealand at that time. A local newspaper report noted his interest in studying foliicolous lichens (lichens that grow on tree leaves), which are rare outside tropical regions. Du Rietz's New Zealand itinerary included the Tararua Mountains, montane research stations operated by Canterbury College, Hokitika, Mount Cook, and the fjords of northwest Otago. He was already somewhat familiar with New Zealand lichens, having previously corresponded with plant geographer Leonard Cockayne and botanist Harry Allan, the latter of whom had sent lichen samples to Du Rietz for study.

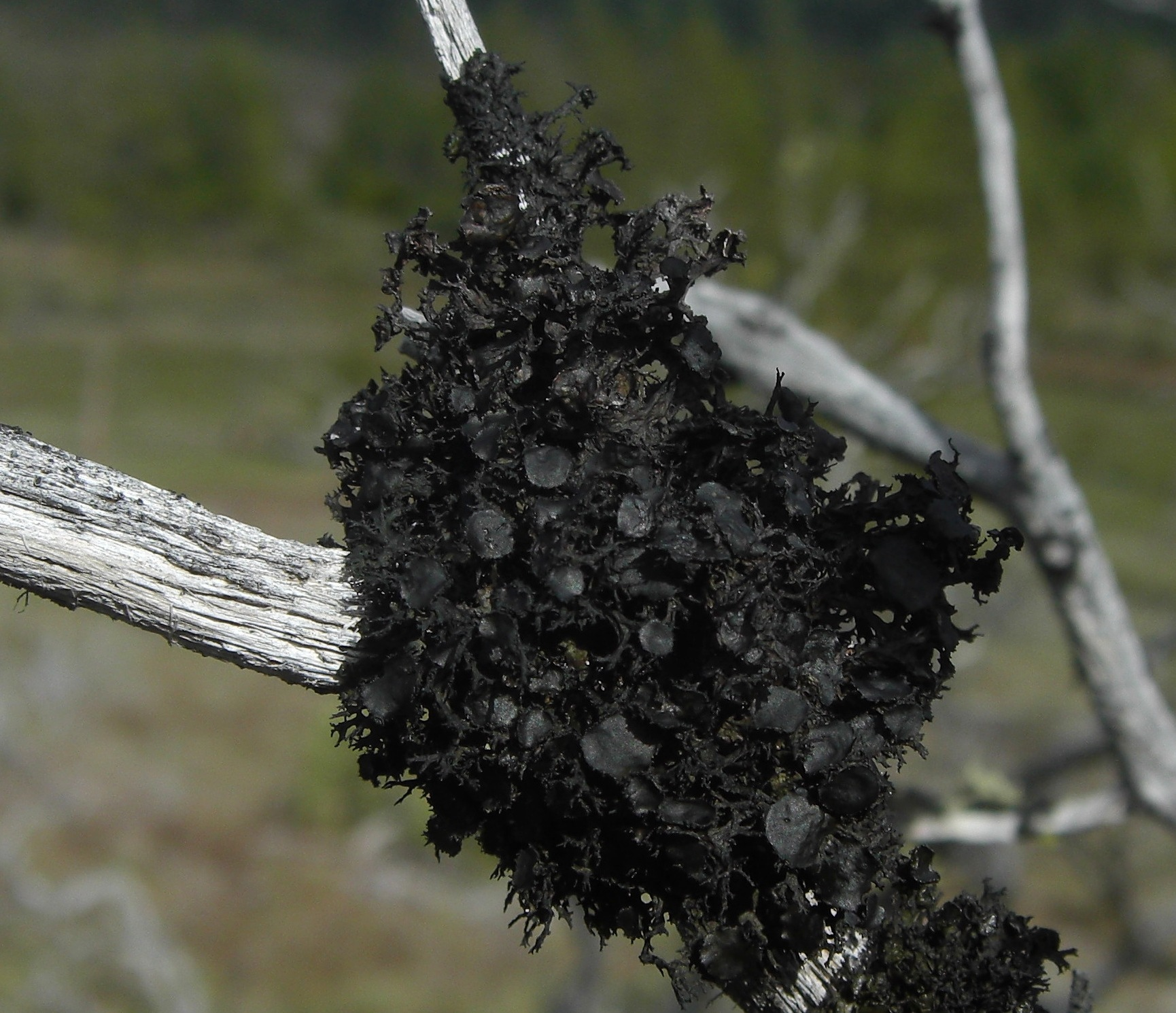
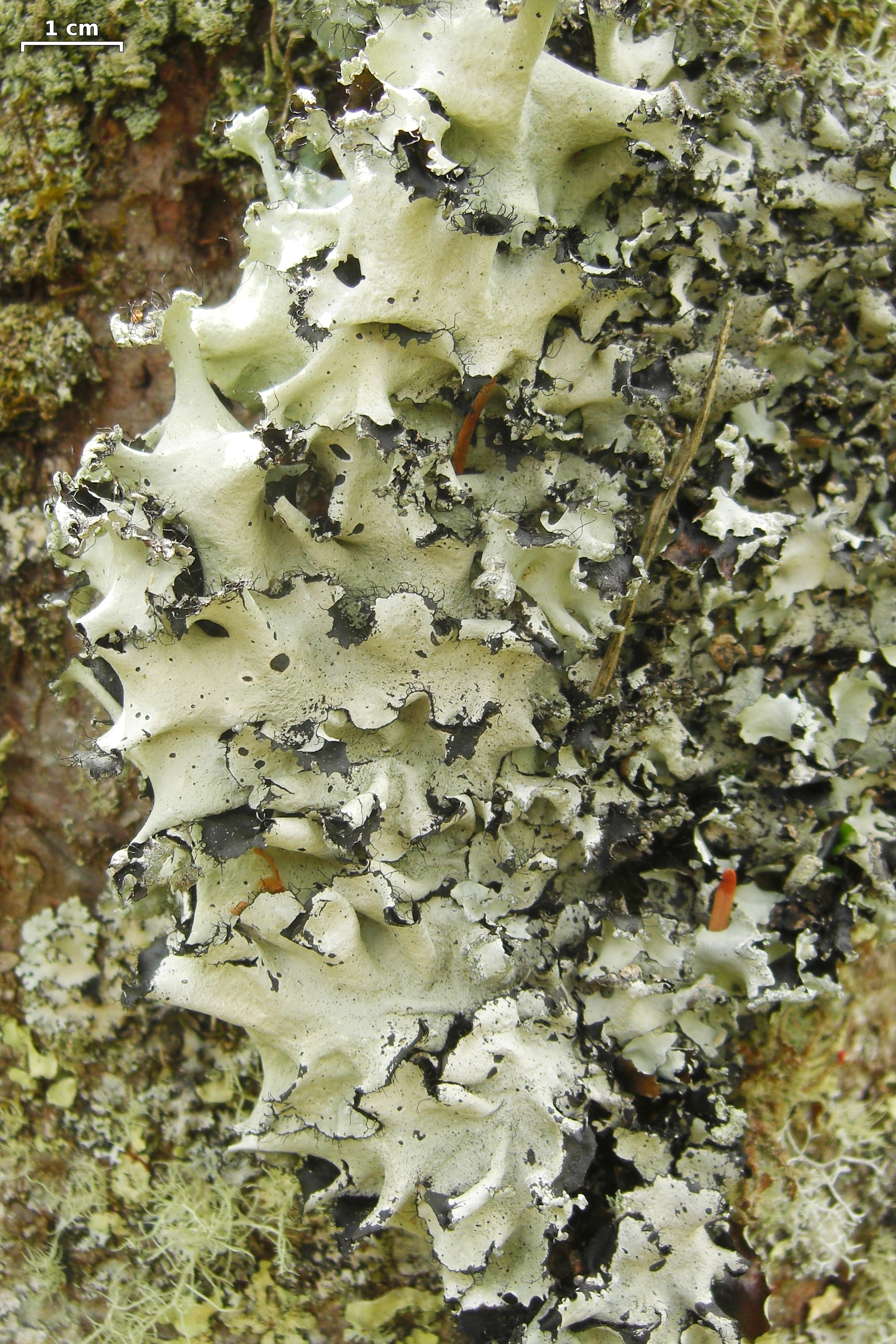
Kaernefeltia merrillii and Parmotrema arnoldii are two lichens that were originally described by Du Rietz.

Although Greta Sernander Du Rietz was an accomplished lichenologist in her own right, she did not have any formal university training in the subject, having been taught instead by her father, who was Professor of Botany at Uppsala University. In New Zealand, she primarily collated and preserved specimens collected by her husband, and only began writing about lichens after their divorce, later in her life. The local newspaper, The Evening Post, reported Du Rietz's visit, and described him as "virtually the founder of the important Swedish school of ecology" and "probably the foremost expert regarding lichens".

The New Zealand part of the trip was coordinated by Leonard Cockayne, working for the New Zealand State Forest Service. Du Rietz had also corresponded with Henry A. Gleason, who had sent him lichen samples for identification in 1925. Du Rietz returned with about 3,000 specimens that he was unable to fully process due to his academic commitments in Sweden. Nevertheless, some of his collections were included in Adolf Hugo Magnusson's 1943 report, and his collections of Pseudocyphellaria were an integral part of a major revision of that genus published in 1988. He was the first to report on the existence of bipolar lichens (i.e., identical taxa in the polar or subpolar regions of the Northern and Southern hemispheres) in New Zealand. Bipolar lichens were a particular interest of his, and he wrote about species he encountered in Arctic areas and cool areas of the Southern Hemisphere.

== Legacy ==
Einar Du Rietz's legacy is marked by significant contributions to nature conservation, academic teaching, and plant sociology. In addition to mentoring numerous students, he was deeply committed to preserving biotopes and small cryptogams, which he valued as much as the more conspicuous flowering plants. As a member of the Swedish Royal Academy of Sciences' nature conservation committee, he played a key role in surveying and documenting Swedish natural habitats, particularly those threatened by industrial expansion. Despite being more theoretical in his approach to vegetation research and not producing major vegetation monographs, he authored numerous summarising works and delivered factual yet engaging lectures, often enhanced with vivid colour photographs. As an inspirational teacher, Du Rietz guided his students through complex field research, fostering a significant degree of independence and shaping them into researchers with broad expertise. His dedication to the field and his students impacted the direction and development of plant geographical studies in Sweden, leaving a legacy in both academic and conservation communities.

== Recognition ==
In 1949, Du Rietz was elected to the Royal Swedish Academy of Sciences. As a member of the Swedish Academy of Sciences' nature conservation committee, he organized surveys of the shores of the lakes and river stretches that were threatened by the ongoing expansion of hydroelectric power in Norrland.

The volume, a tribute to Du Rietz's significant scientific contributions, includes 43 articles encompassing a wide spectrum of Swedish vegetation. This compilation served not only as an acknowledgment of Du Rietz's impact on phytosociology and botanical studies in Sweden but also aimed to provide an accessible resource to a global audience, reflecting the international reach and influence of his work. Decades after his death, his botanical collections from riverbanks and lakeshores in northwestern Sweden have been instrumental in expanding the known distributions of several species. Ultimately, his collections were distributed among the herbaria] of Uppsala, Lund, and Stockholm.

=== Eponymy ===
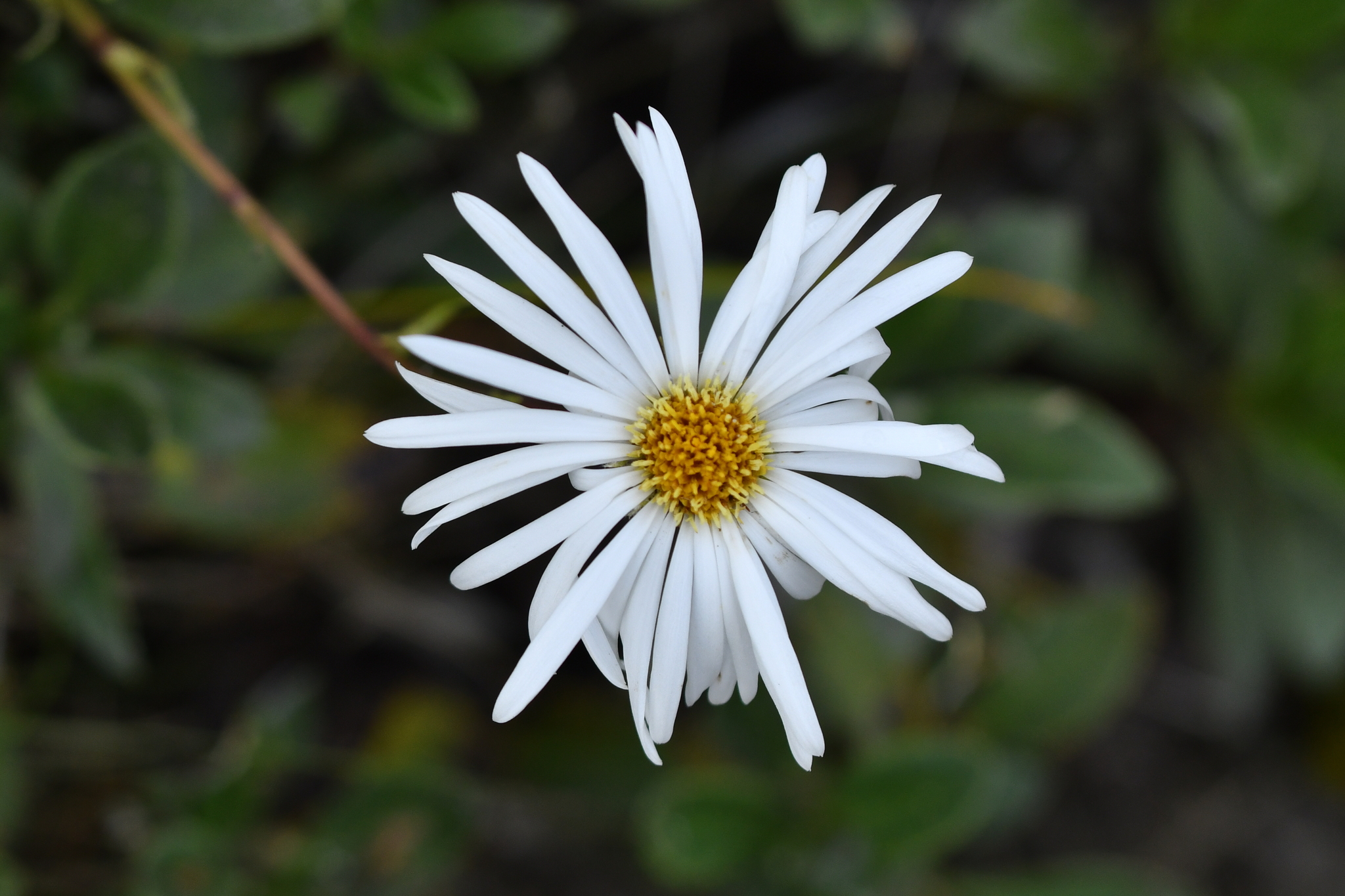
A flower of the plant Celmisia durietzii

In 1935, Vilmos Kőfaragó-Gyelnik named the genus Durietzia after Du Rietz; this genus has since been made synonymous with Ionaspis. In 1964, Carroll William Dodge proposed the subgenus Durietzia of genus Lobaria, writing "I take great pleasure dedicating this to my friend Einer Du Rietz, who first pointed out to me some of the physiologic and ecologic implications of the rimose cortex in species of Parmelia, and argued for its recognition as a taxonomic character". Isao Yoshimura tried to promote this subgenus to a genus in 1998, but it is not an accepted name as it is a junior homonym of Gyelnik's name; the taxon is now known as genus Lobariella.

Du Rietz has also had several species named after him, including the lichens Acarospora durietzii H.Magn. (1924); Caloplaca durietzii H.Magn. (1953); Collema durietzii Degel. (1974); Degelia durietzii Arv. & D.J.Galloway (1981); Lecidea durietzii H.Magn. (1943); Lecidora durietzii Motyka (1996); Placopsis durietziorum D.J.Galloway (2004); Pseudocyphellaria durietzii Galloway (1983); Psoroma durietzii P.James & Henssen (1975); Umbilicaria durietzii Frey (1949); Usnea durietzii Motyka (1937); Verrucaria durietzii I.M.Lamb (1948); Xanthoparmelia durietzii Hale (1987); the flowering plants Celmisia durietzii Cockayne & Allan (Ohan), Euphrasia durietzii Yamam., and Euphrasia durietziana Ohwi; and the diatom Fragilaria durietzii A.Cleve-Euler.

== Selected publications ==
Between 1912 and 1966, Einar Du Rietz published about 250 scientific works. Many are listed in Sjörs' biography of him. Some of his major works include:

- Du Rietz, G. Einar (1924). "Studien über die Vegetation der Alpen, mit derjenigen Skandinaviens verglichen" [Studies on the vegetation of the Alps, compared with that of Scandinavia]. Veröffentlichungen des Geobotanischen Institutes der Eidg. Techn. Hochschule, Stiftung Rübel, in Zürich I (in German): 31–138.
- ———————— (1925). Gotländische Vegetationsstudien [Gotland Vegetation Studies] (PDF). Svenska Växtsociologiska Sällskapets Handlingar (in German). Vol. 2. Uppsala: Svenska växtsociologiska sällskapet. pp. 1–65.
- ———————— (1925). "Die regionale Gliederung der skandinavischen Vegetation" [The Regional Division of Scandinavian Vegetation] (PDF). Svenska Växtsociologiska Sällskapets Handlingar (in German). 8. Uppsala: Svenska växtsociologiska sällskapet: 1–60.
- ———————— (1930). "The fundamental units of biological taxonomy" (PDF). Svensk Botanisk Tidskrift. 24 (3): 333–426.
- ———————— (1931). "Life-forms of terrestrial flowering plants I". Acta Phytogeographica Suecica. 3 (1): 1–95.
- ———————— (1940). "Problems of bipolar plant distribution". Acta Phytogeographica Suecica. 13: 215–282.
- ———————— (1949). "Huvudenheter och huvudgränser i svensk myrvegetation" [Main units and main boundaries in Swedish mire vegetation] (PDF). Svensk Botanisk Tidskrift (in Swedish). 43: 274–309.
- ———————— (1957). "Linne som myrforskare" [Linnaeus as a bog researcher]. Uppsala Universitet Årsskrift (in Swedish). 1957 (5): 3–80.
- ———————— (1965). "Biozönosen und Synusien in der Pflanzensoziologie" [Biocoenoses and Synusia in Plant Sociology]. In Tüxen, R. (ed.). Biosoziologie [Biosociology]. Berichte über die Internationalen Symposia der Internationalen Vereinigung für Vegetationskunde (in German). Vol. 4. The Hague: Springer. pp. 23–42. doi:10.1007/978-94-011-7597-5_4. ISBN 978-94-011-7598-2.
