= Mikhail Piatrovich Tomin =

Russian and Soviet lichenologist (1883–1967)

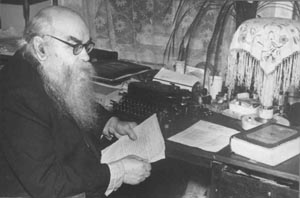
Mikhail Piatrovich Tomin

Mikhail Piatrovich Tomin (25 July 1883 – 30 May 1967) was a Russian and Soviet lichenologist.

== Life and career ==
Mikhail Piatrovich Tomin was born on July 25, 1883, in the village of Sharovichi, Kaluga Governorate. He studied at the Moscow Agricultural Institute, from which he graduated in 1912. Until 1929, Tomin worked at the Voronezh Agricultural Institute (first as a laboratory assistant, then as an assistant to Boris Aleksandrovich Keller), after which he moved to Arkhangelsk, becoming head of the department of botany at the Forestry Engineering Institute. From 1931 to 1934 M.P. Tomin was a professor at the Orenburg Institute of Large Beef Cattle Breeding and Veterinary Medicine. In 1937, Tomin received his doctorate in biological sciences. Until 1941 he taught at the Belarusian State University. He was a corresponding member of the National Academy of Sciences of Belarus since 1940.

After the end of the Great Patriotic War, Tomin continued to work in Minsk, where he headed the flora sector of the Central Botanical Garden of the National Academy of Sciences. In 1956, he was elected an academician of the National Academy of Sciences of Belarus. In 1960–1961 he was the head of the herbarium of the Institute of Biology.

Mikhail Piatrovich Tomin died in Minsk on May 30, 1967, at age 83.

== Eponyms ==
Lichens species named in honour of Tomin include Aspicilia tominii Oxner (1972); Caloplaca tominii Savicz (1930); Parmelia tominii Oxner (1933); Placidiopsis tominii Bredkina (1972); Rinodina tominii H.Mayrhofer (1984); and Usnea tominii Räsänen (1934).

== Selected works ==
- Tomin, M. P. (1937). Определитель кустистых и листоватых лишайников СССР [Key to fruticose and foliose lichens of the USSR]. Minsk.
- Tomin, M. P. (1956). Определитель корковых лишайников Европейской части СССР [Key to crustose lichens of the European part of the USSR]. Minsk.
- Komarnitsky, N.A.; Tomin, M.P.; Krasilnikov, N.A. (1960). Лишайники, бактерии и актиномицеты [Lichens, bacteria and actinomycetes]. Определитель низших растений [Determinant of lower plants]. Vol. 5.
- Shishkin, B.K.; Tomin, M.P.; Goncharok, M.N., eds. (1967). Определитель растений Белоруссии [Key to plants in Belarus]. Minsk.
