= Timdalia =

Scientific classification
- Domain: Eukaryota
- Kingdom: Fungi
- Division: Ascomycota
- Class: Lecanoromycetes
- Order: Acarosporales
- Family: Acarosporaceae
- Genus: Timdalia; Hafellner (2001)
- Species: T. intricata

Binomial name
- Timdalia intricata (H.Magn.) Hafellner (2001)

Synonyms
- Acarospora intricata H.Magn. (1935)

Genus of fungi

Timdalia is a fungal genus in the family Acarosporaceae. It is a monotypic genus, containing the single species Timdalia intricata, a saxicolous (rock-dwelling), crustose lichen. This species was first formally described by Swedish lichenologist Adolf Hugo Magnusson in 1935, based on a collection made by Eduard Frey in Austria. It was initially classified in the genus Acarospora. Josef Hafellner circumscribed Timdalia to contain the species in 2001. It was initially placed in the family Lecanoraceae, but molecular phylogenetic studies showed Timdalia to belong in the Acarosporaceae. The genus name honours Norwegian lichenologist Einar Timdal.

Later collections of Timdalia intricata were made in the Austrian Alps, Italy, and various Scandinavian locations. In Scandinavia, the lichen is usually found at subalpine and alpine elevation ranges between 630 and 1,400 m (2,070 and 4,590 ft), typically on vertical to overhanging rock faces, and on iron-containing silicate rocks.
