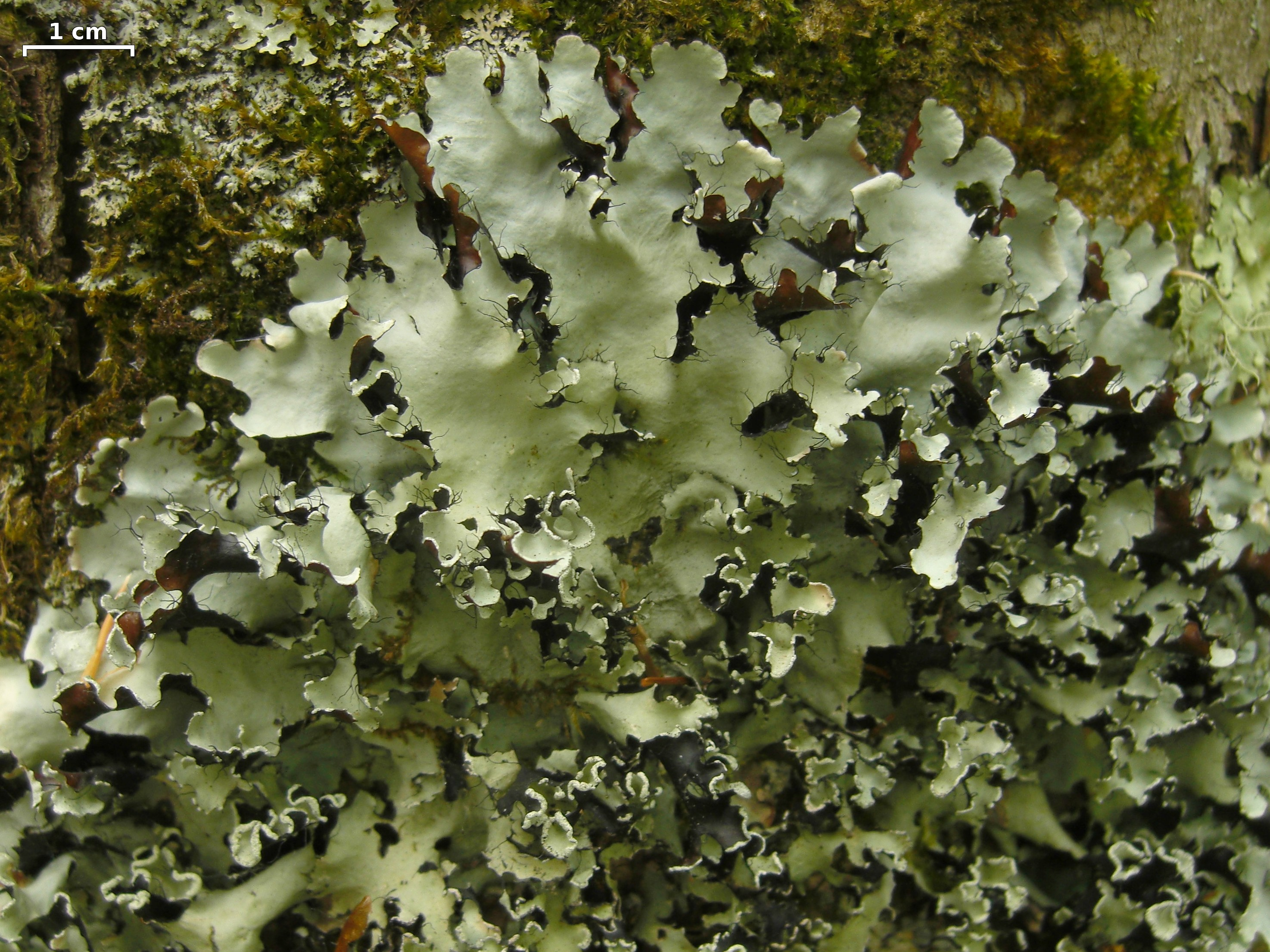
- in North Carolina, USA

Conservation status
- Apparently Secure (NatureServe)

Scientific classification
- Kingdom: Fungi
- Division: Ascomycota
- Class: Lecanoromycetes
- Order: Lecanorales
- Family: Parmeliaceae
- Genus: Parmotrema
- Species: P. stuppuem

Binomial name
- Parmotrema stuppuem (Taylor) Hale (1979)

Synonyms
- Parmelia claudelii (Harm.) Vain. (1909); Parmelia perforata var. claudelii Harm. (1897); Parmelia stuppea Taylor (1847); Parmelia trichotera var. claudelii (Harm.) Du Rietz (1924); Parmotrema claudelii (Harm.) M.Choisy (1952)

= Parmotrema stuppuem =

Species of lichen

Parmotrema stuppuem is a corticolous (bark-dwelling), foliose lichen that belongs to the large family Parmeliaceae. The lichen is commonly known as the powder-edged ruffle lichen and is listed as apparently secure by the Nature Conservancy.

== Description ==
Parmotrema stuppuem grows to around 2–20 cm in diameter with broad, dull, smooth gray lobes that are 4–8 mm wide. The underside is black and brown with a central collection of simple rhizines.

== Habitat and range ==
Parmotrema stuppuem has a pantropical and pantemperate distribution, and is found across North America with a majority of samples being collected in and around the Great Lakes region of the United States. In Mexico, P. stuppeum is one of the most common foliose lichens found at intermediate to fairly high elevations in the mountains. It also occurs in Europe, southern Africa, southern Asia, and Central America.

== Chemistry ==
Antioxidants have been extracted from Parmotrema stuppuem. Additionally the lichen is a promising host for the development of antibacterial compounds.

== See also ==
- List of Parmotrema species
