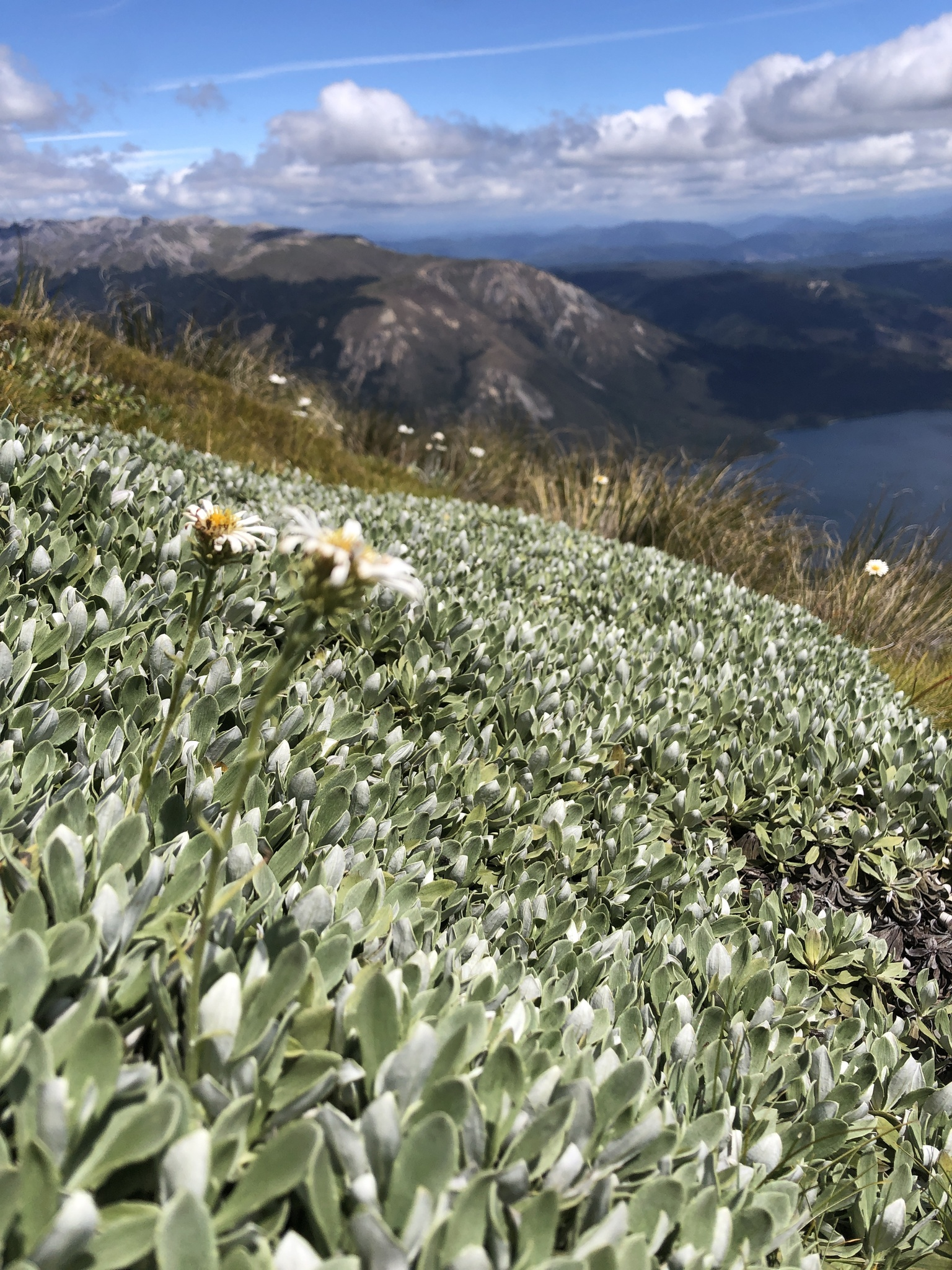
- Celmisia durietzii in Nelson Lakes National Park

Conservation status
- Not Threatened (NZ TCS)

Scientific classification
- Kingdom: Plantae
- Clade: Embryophytes
- Clade: Tracheophytes
- Clade: Angiosperms
- Clade: Eudicots
- Clade: Asterids
- Order: Asterales
- Family: Asteraceae
- Genus: Celmisia
- Species: C. durietzii

Binomial name
- Celmisia durietzii Cockayne & Allan

= Celmisia durietzii =

Species of flowering plant

Celmisia durietzii, commonly known as Durietz’s mountain daisy, is a species of flowering plant endemic to New Zealand. It is not threatened. It is named in honour of the Swedish botanist and lichenologist Gustaf Einar Du Rietz, who, along with his wife Greta, researched New Zealand lichen species.

== Description ==
Celmisia durietzii is a low plant that grows a perennial stalked yellow flower with white petals.

To distinguish this Celmisia from others, consider: the sheath, which should translucent and hairless; evenly-haired achenes; and short, somewhat narrow leaves. The habitat is also important; it is neither coastal like Celmisia lindsayi, nor in wet habitats like Celmisia bonplandii.

== Distribution and habitat ==
Celmisia durietzii is known from the South Island, from Marlborough south to Fiordland. It may extend into Fiordland and Stewart Island, but those populations may also be an undescribed species.
