= Pannaria durietzii =

Scientific classification
- Kingdom: Fungi
- Division: Ascomycota
- Class: Lecanoromycetes
- Order: Peltigerales
- Family: Pannariaceae
- Genus: Pannaria
- Species: P. durietzii

Binomial name
- Pannaria durietzii (P.James & Henssen) Elvebakk & D.J.Galloway (2003)

Synonyms
- Psoroma durietzii P.James & Henssen (1975)

Species of lichen

Pannaria durietzii is a species of corticolous (bark-dwelling), foliose lichen in the family Pannariaceae. Primarily found in New Zealand, it has also been reported in southeastern Australia and Tasmania, and southern Chile, indicating a broader southern hemisphere distribution.

== Taxonomy ==
The type specimen was collected in 1927 by Gustaf and Greta Sernander-Du Rietz from the South Hokitika Experimental Station, where it was found growing on Pterophylla racemosa. It was formally described as a new species in 1975 by Peter James and Aino Henssen, who initially classified it in the genus Psoroma. Arve Elvebakk and David Galloway transferred the taxon to the genus Pannaria in 2003.

== Description ==
The lichen forms a rosette-shaped thallus (body) that typically reaches 2–5 cm in diameter, though it can grow up to 5 cm across. Multiple thalli sometimes merge to create larger, irregular patches. The thallus is firmly attached to its substrate, with lobed edges and a distinctive blue-black fuzzy layer of root-like structures (rhizines) underneath that anchor it in place. This dark layer sometimes extends beyond the main body as a visible border (prothallus). The upper surface is flat or slightly concave, smooth and somewhat shiny, ranging in colour from greenish-brown to yellowish. The lobes at the thallus edges are 2–3.5 mm wide and radiate outward, while the central lobes are smaller and often overlap each other. In shaded conditions, the lobes may grow more spread apart.

Pannaria durietzii cephalodia, which contain blue-green algae (Nostoc). These appear as pale brown to flesh-coloured bumps up to 1 mm wide, usually forming near the lobe edges. The cephalodia produce a powdery, blue-grey granular substance (soredia) that helps the lichen reproduce vegetatively. These granules initially form on the underside and edges of the cephalodia but eventually spread to cover their entire surface.

Fruiting bodies (apothecia) are rare, occurring in less than 5% of specimens. When present, they are crowded together, 0.5–1.5 mm wide, and start out globe-shaped before becoming cup-shaped. They have thick margins matching the thallus colour and flesh-coloured to pink centres that appear slightly whitish due to a powdery coating. The centres often develop cracks or acquire a plug of sterile tissue.

== Distribution ==
Pannaria durietzii is primarily found in New Zealand, with a widespread distribution across both the North and South Islands, as well as several offshore islands. In the North Island, it has been recorded in the South Auckland region (Kuratau) and various ranges in the Wellington area, including the Kaimanawa, Ruahine, Tararua, and Remutaka Ranges.

On the South Island, the species is present in diverse locations. It has been observed in Nelson (St Arnaud Range, West Bay, Lake Rotoiti), Westland (Stillwater, Haast), Canterbury (Lewis Pass, Arthur's Pass, Governor's Bush), Otago (Haast Pass, Lake Hāwea, Olivine Valley, Routeburn Valley), and Southland (Milford Sound, Cascade Cove, Dusky Sound, Lake Te Anau, Lake Manapouri, Wilmot Pass).

The lichen's range extends to several New Zealand subantarctic islands. It has been documented on Stewart Island (Butterfield's Beach, Glory Cove, Port Pegasus), the Auckland Islands (Laurie Harbour, Ranui Cove, Terror Cove, Rose Island, Ewing Island, Enderby Island), and Campbell Island (Mt Lyall, Mt Dumas, Mt Honey).

The species can be found growing on tree bark, and rarely on rocks or dead wood. It prefers relatively open woodlands and clearings rather than dense forest, typically in areas with annual rainfall between 200 and 250 cm. It is absent from the wettest regions of New Zealand's Fiordland.

Beyond New Zealand, P. durietzii has also been reported in southeastern Australia and Tasmania, as documented by various researchers. Additionally, the species has been recorded in Southern Chile, indicating a broader austral distribution.
