= Adolf Hugo Magnusson =

Swedish lichenologist

- Born: 1 March 1885; Gottröra, Sweden
- Died: 14 July 1964 (aged 79); Gothenburg, Sweden
- Scientific career
- Fields: Lichenology
- Author abbrev. (botany): H.Magn.

Adolf Hugo Magnusson (1 March 1885 – 14 July 1964) was a Swedish naturalist who specialized in lichenology. He was a school teacher in Gothenburg from 1909 to 1948, but spent his spare time on the study of lichens. Magnusson published many monographs and floristic papers, specializing in crustose lichens. He formally described about 900 new taxa, specializing in the genera Lecidea, Lecanora, Caloplaca, and Acarospora.

== Early life and education ==
Adolf Hugo Magnusson was born on 1 March 1885, in the parish of Gottröra, Uppland (Stockholm County). His parents, Johan Adolf Magnusson, an elementary schoolmaster with a talent for practical work, and Sofia, née Olsson, were from Södermanland. His father, who died in 1935, was a skilled craftsman in various trades and passed on his practical abilities to his son. Despite the strictness of his father, which contributed to a difficult childhood for Adolf and his sister, Magnusson developed an early passion for collecting plants, insects, and stamps.

Magnusson's formal education began at the Norrtälje secondary school, followed by the grammar school in Uppsala. Magnusson began studying botany at Uppsala University in 1904, but was forced to cancel his studies for financial reasons after only a year and instead became educated as a primary school teacher, earning his teaching certificate in 1906. After brief teaching stints in Lidingö and Onsala, Magnusson secured a permanent position at Annedal elementary school in Gothenburg in 1909. Despite his full-time teaching job, Magnusson continued his studies at the University of Gothenburg, graduating with a Master of Arts degree in 1914, focussing on English, German, geography, and education.

Magnusson's brief time at Uppsala University was crucial for his future in lichenology. He was influenced by docent Rutger Sernander, a dynamic teacher and researcher who sparked Magnusson's interest in lichens through lectures on lichen taxonomy, morphology, and biology. This formative experience, combined with later assistance from lichenologist Gustaf Oskar Andersson Malme of Stockholm and an acquaintance with Gustaf Einar Du Rietz, significantly shaped Magnusson's scientific trajectory.

== Career ==
=== Monographs and major works ===
Magnusson's contributions to lichenology are notably marked by his extensive work on monographs. His initial foray into this area culminated in his first significant monograph on the genus Acarospora, published in 1924. This pioneering work, written in English, detailed the Scandinavian species of this previously underexplored genus of crustose lichens. Magnusson distinguished 36 species, including several new ones, significantly expanding the known diversity from the previously recognised 11 species. This work earned him the prestigious Linné prize from the Royal Scientific Society of Uppsala in 1923. Following this, he published a global monograph on Acarospora in 1929, a comprehensive 400-page volume that critically examined approximately 200 species, of which around 70 were new.

Over the years, Magnusson continued to produce a series of monographs that covered various genera and groups of lichens. Among these, works included studies on Lecidea and Stereocaulon, published in 1925 and 1926 respectively, where he described several new species. His research extended to genera such as Ionaspis, Maronea, Lecanora (including Aspicilia), Caloplaca, and Rinodina. In 1939, he published his second largest monograph on a group of Aspicilia species. Additionally, Magnusson contributed to the renowned book series "Kryptogamen-Flora von Deutschland, Österreich und der Schweiz", specifically covering the families Acarosporaceae and Thelocarpaceae in 1936. His works often included exhaustive literature surveys of morphology, ecology, and taxonomy, establishing his reputation as a leading figure in lichen research.

=== Contributions to botanical institutions ===
Magnusson made significant contributions to various botanical institutions throughout his career, particularly in Gothenburg. During the academic year 1934–1935, he served as the acting director of the Gothenburg Botanical Garden, stepping in for Professor Carl Skottsberg. During his tenure, Magnusson took the opportunity to classify the garden's substantial lichen collection, enhancing its scientific value. His expertise was also frequently sought by the Gothenburg Museum, where he collaborated with Professor Axel Elof Jäderholm on several occasions. These efforts not only enriched the botanical collections but also solidified Magnusson's role as a pivotal figure in the botanical community of Gothenburg.

In addition to his work in Gothenburg, Magnusson's influence extended to broader botanical circles through his extensive fieldwork and meticulous research. He was deeply involved in classifying and studying lichen specimens, which he meticulously collected from various regions. His efforts significantly advanced the understanding of Scandinavian lichens, making valuable contributions to botanical literature and taxonomy. Through his persistent dedication, Magnusson established a lasting legacy within botanical institutions, both locally and internationally, and his work continues to be a cornerstone for researchers in the field of lichenology.

=== Field studies and collections ===
Magnusson's field studies were extensive and spanned various regions, contributing significantly to the understanding of lichen distribution and ecology. He travelled widely within Sweden, from the southern tip to the far north, and was particularly fond of the West Coast. His research in this area was instrumental in advancing the knowledge of the region's rich lichen flora. Magnusson's detailed studies on the West Coast began with his early publications and continued throughout his career. He also conducted fieldwork in Lapland during expeditions in 1919, 1921, and 1924, which resulted in comprehensive reports published years later. His excursions extended beyond Sweden to include parts of Norway, Ireland, and Switzerland, where he collaborated with botanists such as Alfred Frank Fenton and Eduard Frey.

Magnusson's fieldwork also involved extensive herbarium studies and the collection of lichens from various botanical museums across Europe. He visited important collections in cities such as Helsinki, London, Paris, Berlin, and Vienna, among others. These visits allowed him to study type material and make valuable contacts with other lichenologists, enhancing his research on a global scale. Notably, his participation in the Hedin expedition to Central Asia and the Skottsberg expeditions to Hawaii resulted in significant contributions to the understanding of lichen diversity in these regions. Magnusson's personal collection of lichens, eventually sold to Uppsala University, comprised over 70,000 specimens, including numerous type specimens and exchange material from around the world, solidifying his legacy as a preeminent lichenologist. He issued and distributed the well-known exsiccata Lichenes selecti Scandinavici exsiccati (1927–1952) and, earlier in time, the exsiccata-like set Lavsamling (1920).

Some lichens originally described by Magnusson:
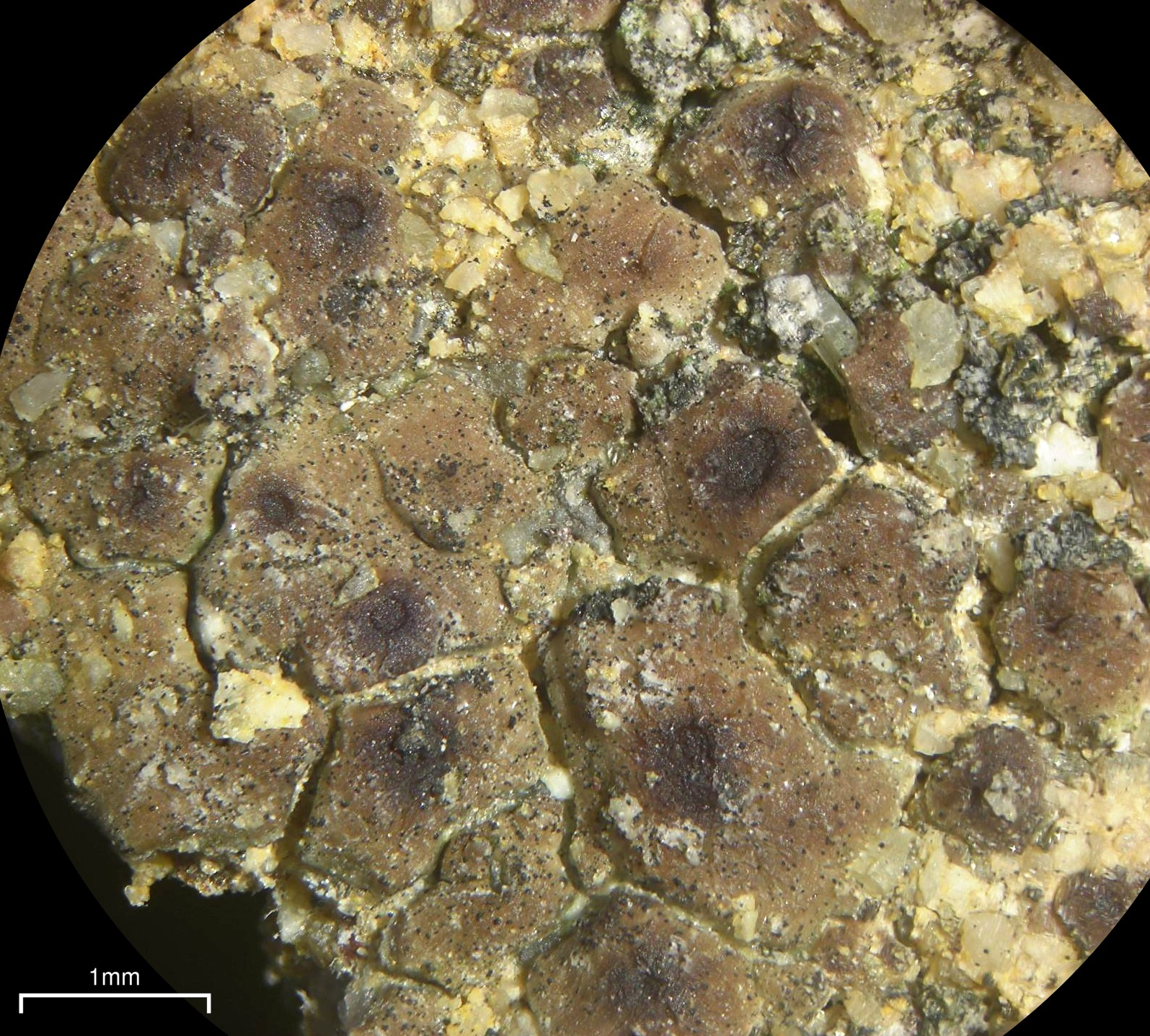
Acarospora obnubila

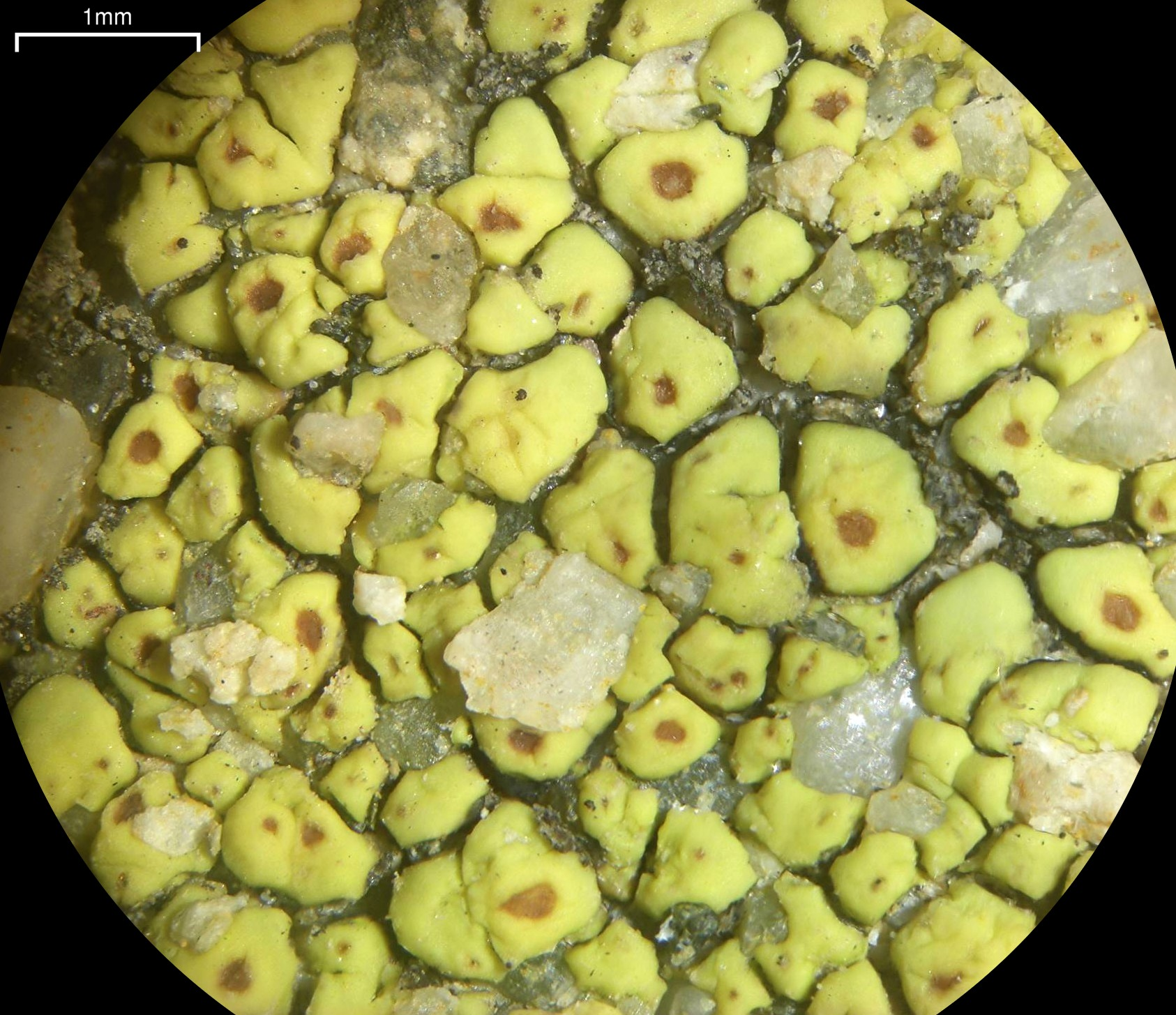
Acarospora socialis

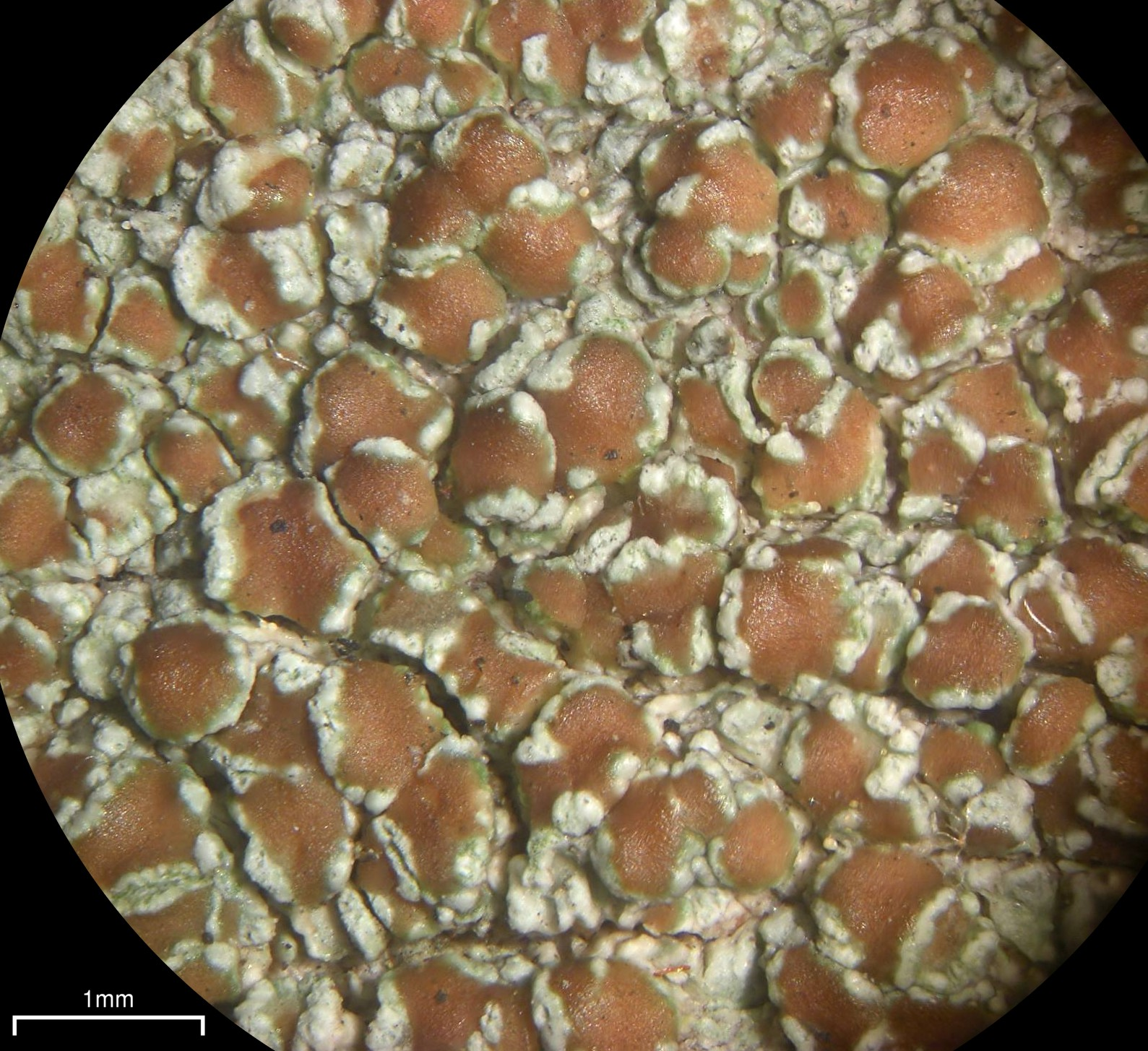
Lecanora cinereofusca

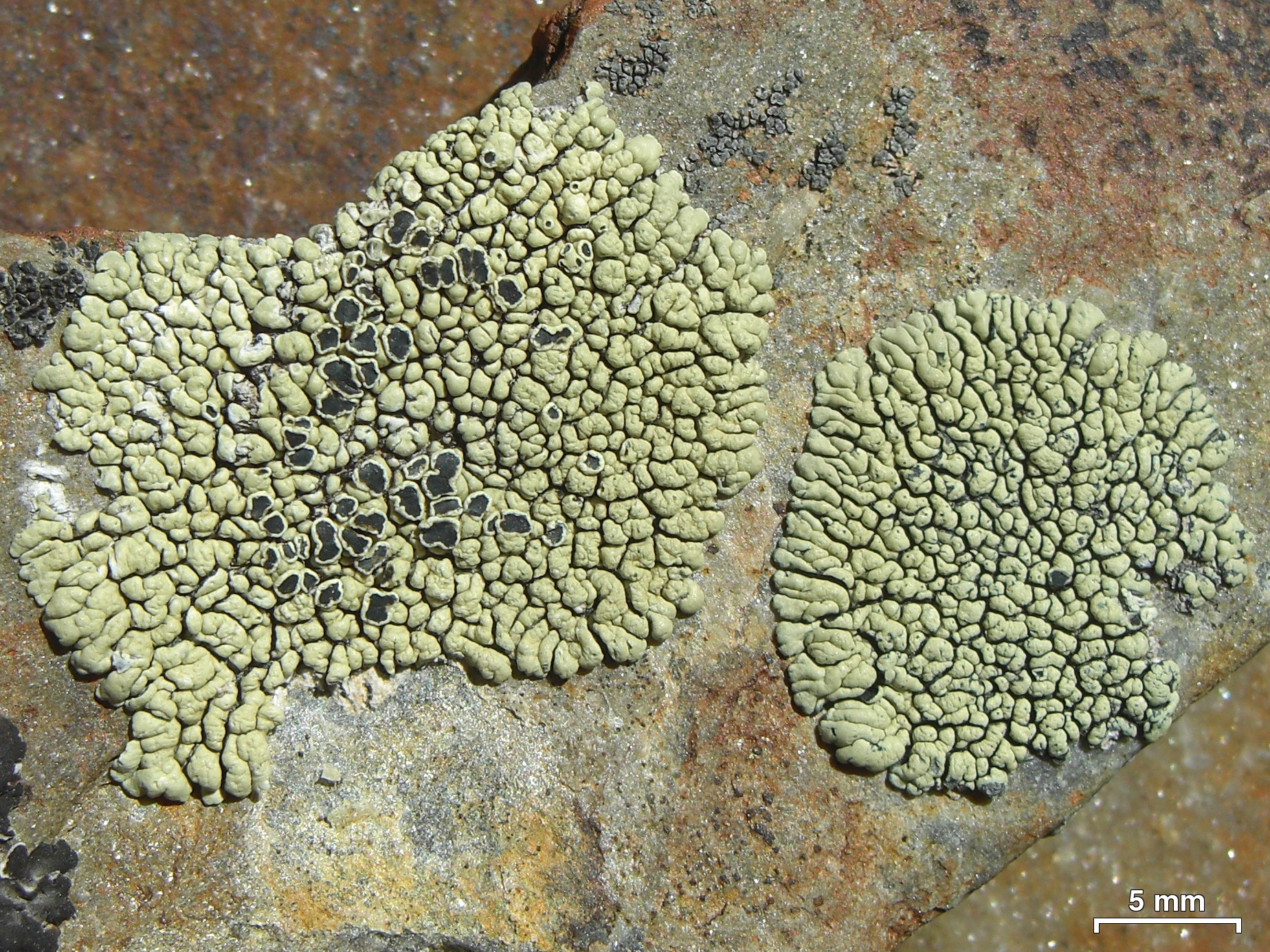
Rhizoplaca novomexicana

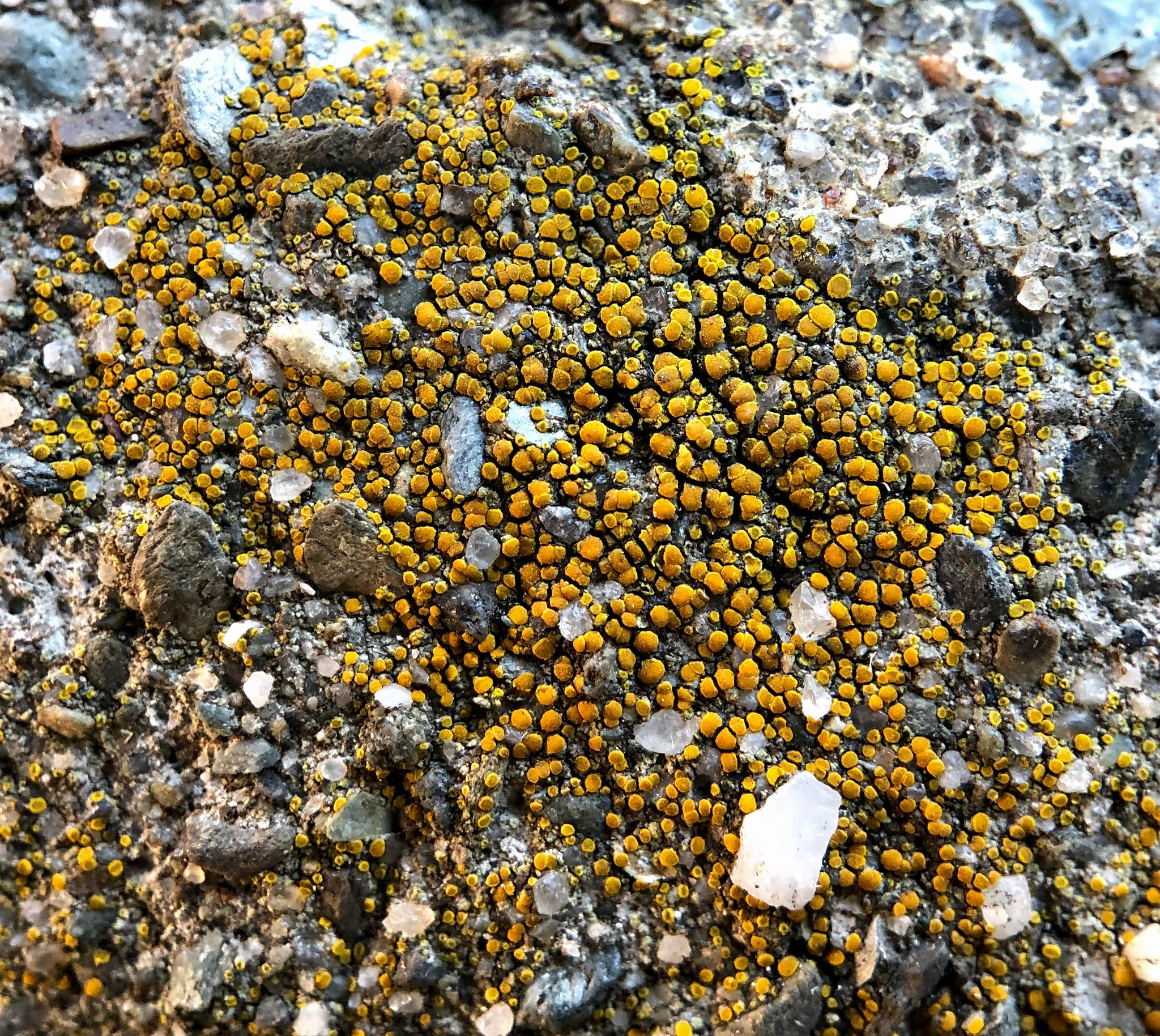
Xanthocarpia feracissima

Magnusson described about 900 species. He studied all kinds of lichens, but was particularly interested in crustose lichens such as Acarospora, Caloplaca, Lecanora, Lecidea, and Rinodina. Magnusson identified more than 900 lichen specimens collected by Finnish amateur botanist Mårten Magnus Brenner during the Yenisey river expedition in 1876. Magnusson's collections, numbering around 70,000 specimens, are kept at Uppsala University.

== Personal life and character ==
In 1911, Magnusson married Signe Sterner, who was also an elementary-school teacher. The couple had four children and moved to a terrace house at 26 Fyradalersgatan, Södra Änggården, Gothenburg, in 1924, where they lived near the Botanical Garden.

Despite his demanding teaching and research commitments, Magnusson was known for his calm and harmonious personality. He was described as natural, frank, and unassuming, with a strong sense of reliability and integrity. While his critical nature occasionally led to sharp remarks, he was appreciated for his honesty and helpfulness. Magnusson was an avid pipe smoker and often worked at his microscope. His dedication to research often took precedence over family life, but he had a supportive wife who understood his scientific passion.

Magnusson enjoyed participating in social gatherings, especially those related to scientific societies. Known for his hospitality and thriftiness, he balanced his personal and professional life effectively. His later years were marked by illness, including heart disease and reduced mobility due to an earlier accident. Despite these challenges, Magnusson remained dedicated to his work until his death on 14 July 1964. He was buried in the cemetery at Kviberg, at the foot of a lichen-covered rock.

== Legacy ==
Magnusson made significant contributions to the field of lichenology, particularly in species taxonomy. His meticulous and independent research resulted in a substantial body of work that remains fundamental in lichen studies. Magnusson described approximately 900 new species, with his taxonomic descriptions often regarded as exemplary due to their detailed and systematic nature.

Magnusson's extensive personal collection of lichens, considered the largest and most valuable ever privately held, was eventually sold to Uppsala University. This collection, comprising over 70,000 specimens, including numerous type specimens, significantly bolstered the university's already prestigious lichen herbarium. His lichenological library, also included in the sale, remains a valuable resource for researchers.

He was a member of the Göteborg Royal Society of Science and Literature and held honorary memberships in various botanical associations, reflecting the high regard in which he was held by his peers.

Magnusson's work laid the groundwork for future lichenologists, and his methodologies in species description and taxonomy have influenced subsequent generations of researchers. His legacy endures through his published works, extensive collections, and the respect and admiration of the scientific community. Magnusson's name remains synonymous with excellence in lichenology, and his contributions continue to shape the field.

== Recognition ==
Adolf Hugo Magnusson received several significant awards and recognitions throughout his career, most notably the Linné prize from the Royal Scientific Society of Uppsala in 1923. This award was given in recognition of his groundbreaking work on the genus Acarospora. In 1932, he was conferred an honorary doctorate by Uppsala University, acknowledging his extensive contributions to lichen taxonomy and his pioneering research.

Magnusson was a respected member of several scientific societies. In 1956, he became a member of the Royal Swedish Academy of Sciences in Gothenburg. He was also an honorary member of the Göteborg Botanical Association, where he served as secretary and treasurer for 33 years, and the American Bryological Society since 1963. Additionally, he was a corresponding member of the Bayerische Botanische Gesellschaft.

=== Eponymy ===
Magnusson has had several lichen taxa named in his honour. These include: Magnussoniolichen Tomas & Cif. (1952) Magnussoniomyces Cif. & Tomas (1953), Acarospora magnussonii Samp. (1924), Caloplaca magni-filii Poelt. (1958), C. magnussoniana S.Y.Konr., Kärnefelt & A.Thell (2011), C. magnussonii Herre (1953), Cetraria magnussonii Llano (1951), Cladonia magnussonii Ahti (1961), Dermatocarpon magnussonii Werner (1951), Involucrothele magnussonii Servít (1953), Lecanora magnussoniana Hafellner & Türk (2001), L. magnussonii Maheu & Werner (1934), Lecidea magnussonii Lynge (1937), Leptogium magnussonii Degel. & P.M.Jørg (1994), Physcia magnussonii Frey (1952), Polyblastia magnussoniana Servít (1953), Rinodina magnussoniana Reichert & Galun (1958), Rinodina magnussonii Brodo (1990), Sarcogyne magnussonii B.De Lesd. (1932), Squamarina magnussonii Frey & Poelt (1958), Thelocarpon magnussonii G.Salisb. (1953), Umbilicaria magnussonii Llano (1950), and Verrucaria magnussoniana Servít (1952).

== Selected works ==
Magnusson became an internationally renowned lichenologist with about 150 scientific publications. Among Magnusson's influential publications are his monographs on the genus Acarospora, with his works in 1924 and 1929 being particularly noteworthy. These publications significantly expanded the understanding of this genus and earned him critical acclaim. His contributions to "Kryptogamen-Flora von Deutschland, Österreich und der Schweiz" on the families Acarosporaceae and Thelocarpaceae are also significant.

- Magnusson, A.H. (1919). "Material till västkustens lavflora". Svensk Botanisk Tidskrift (in Swedish). 10: 75–92.
- Magnusson, A.H. (1924). A Monograph of the Scandinavian Species of the Genus Acarospora. Göteborgs Kungl. Vetenskaps- och Vitterhets-Samhälles Handlingar Fjärde följden. Vol. 28. pp. 1–149.
- Magnusson, A.H. "Studies in the Rivulosa Group of the Genus Lecidea". Göteborgs Kungl. Vetenskaps- och Vitterhets-Samhälles Handlingar. Fjärde följden. 29 (4): 1–50.
- Magnusson, A.H. "Studies on Boreal Stereocaula". Göteborgs Kungl. Vetenskaps- och Vitterhets-Samhälles Handlingar. Fjärde följden. 30 (7): 1–89.
- Magnusson, A.H. (1929). "A Monograph of the Genus Acarospora". Kungl. Svenska Vetenskapsakademiens Handlingar. 3. 7 (4): 1–400.
- Magnusson, A.H. (1939). "Studies in Species of Lecanora mainly the Aspicilia gibbosa Group". Kungl. Svenska Vetenskapsakademiens Handlingar. 3. 17 (5): 1–182.
- Magnusson, A.H. (1940). "Studies in Species of Pseudocyphellaria. The Crocata-group". Acta Horti Gotoburgensis. Meddelanden från Göteborgs Botaniska Trädgård. 14: 1–36.

== See also ==
- Category:Taxa named by Adolf Hugo Magnusson
