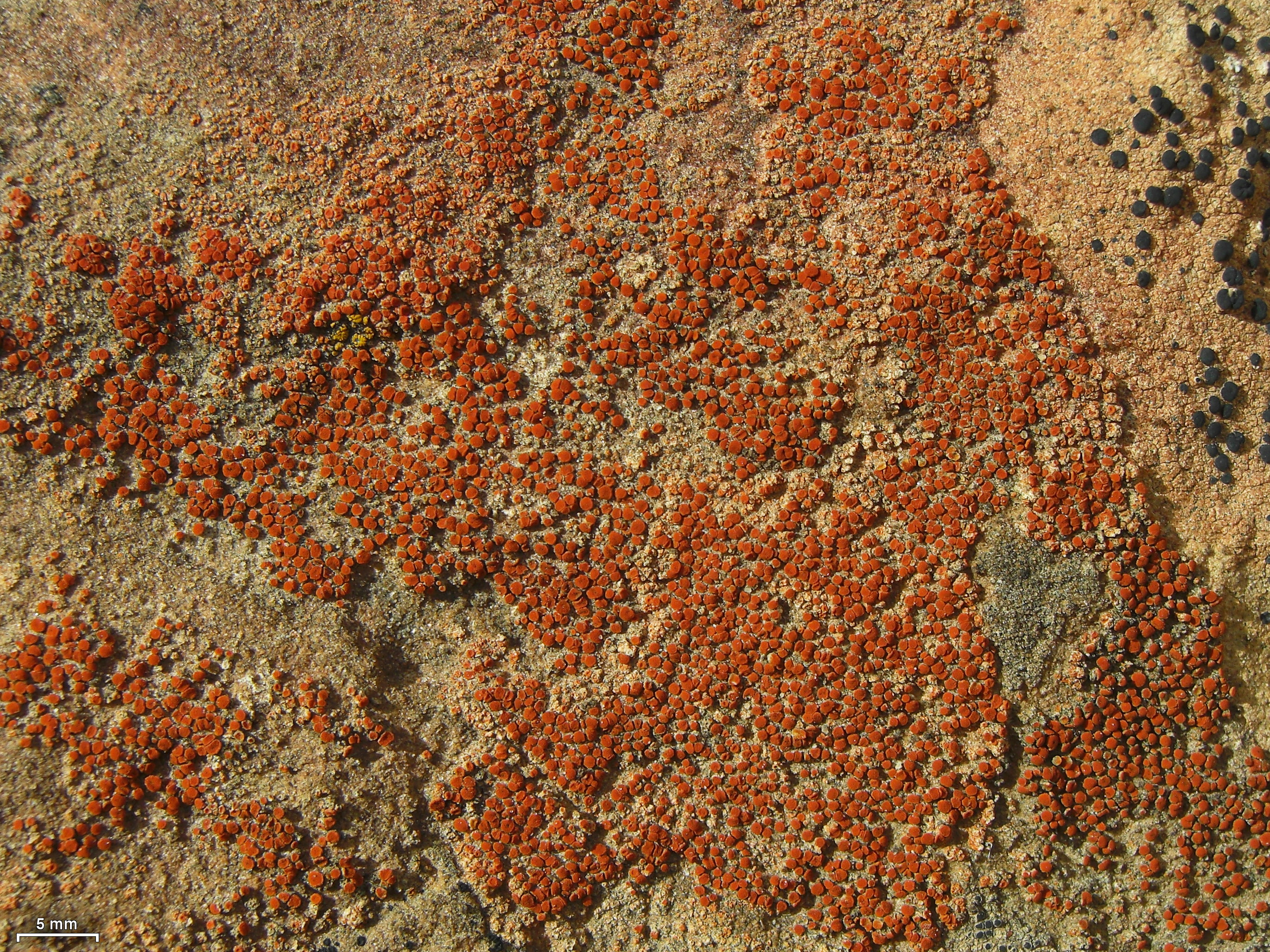
- on sandstone, near Canyonlands, Utah

Scientific classification
- Domain: Eukaryota
- Kingdom: Fungi
- Division: Ascomycota
- Class: Lecanoromycetes
- Order: Teloschistales
- Family: Teloschistaceae
- Genus: Xanthocarpia
- Species: X. crenulatella

Binomial name
- Xanthocarpia crenulatella (Nyl.) Frödén, Arup & Søchting (2013)

Synonyms
- Lecanora crenulatella Nyl. (1886); Caloplaca crenulatella (Nyl.) H.Olivier (1909); Placodium crenulatellum (Nyl.) A.L.Sm. (1918)

= Xanthocarpia crenulatella =

Species of lichen

Xanthocarpia crenulatella is a species of saxicolous (rock-dwelling), crustose lichen in the family Teloschistaceae.

== Taxonomy ==
The species was first formally described by William Nylander in 1886, as a member of genus Lecanora. Henri Olivier transferred it to the genus Caloplaca in 1909, and it was generally known as this name for more than a century. In 2013, Arup and colleagues transferred the taxon to genus Xanthocarpia based on a molecular phylogenetics-led restructuring of the family Teloschistaceae.

Jan Vondrák and colleagues have suggested that Xanthocarpia crenulatella may represent an assemblage of microspecies, "because it is phenotypically quite heterogenous and other species have been described within it", listing X. borysthenica and X. feracissima as specific examples of members of this species complex.
