= Caloplaca magnussoniana =

Scientific classification
- Domain: Eukaryota
- Kingdom: Fungi
- Division: Ascomycota
- Class: Lecanoromycetes
- Order: Teloschistales
- Family: Teloschistaceae
- Genus: Caloplaca
- Species: C. magnussoniana

Binomial name
- Caloplaca magnussoniana S.Y.Kondr., Kärnefelt & A.Thell (2011)

Species of lichen

Caloplaca magnussoniana is a species of crustose lichen in the family Teloschistaceae. This small orange-brown lichen forms crusty patches on both volcanic rocks like dolerite and basalt, as well as limestone surfaces in sheltered but well-lit locations. It is found in temperate southeastern Australia, particularly in Victoria and Tasmania, from sea level up to about 600 metres elevation. The species is named after the Swedish lichenologist Adolf Hugo Magnusson and can be distinguished from similar species by its tightly clustered fruiting bodies and unique microscopic features including oil-filled cells in its reproductive structures.

== Taxonomy ==
Caloplaca magnussoniana was formally described in 2011 by Sergey Kondratyuk, Ingvar Kärnefelt and Arne Thell from a specimen gathered on dolerite at Mount Barrow, north-eastern Tasmania. The epithet commemorates the Swedish lichenologist Adolf Hugo Magnusson, who worked extensively on the genus and originally erected the closely related C. lithophila. Morphologically and chemically the new species belongs to the C. lithophila species complex, whose members have pale thalli and yellow-orange fruiting bodies coupled with small, one-septate ascospores. Within that assemblage C. magnussoniana is set apart by three linked characters: its apothecia (fruiting bodies) crowd tightly towards the centre of the colony, the paraphyses in the hymenium carry abundant oil-filled cells (rather than mere droplets), and each ascospore has a comparatively narrow median wall (septum) only three to four micrometres (μm) across. These features distinguish it from C. lithophila, which lacks oil cells, has broader spores and usually shows a faint whitish thallus with more scattered apothecia, and from Amundsenia approximata (formerly in Caloplaca), whose spores and septa are appreciably wider again.

== Description ==
Seen in the field the lichen forms small, often coalescing crusts one to two centimetres across. Because the surface is dominated by scores of minute fruiting discs, the colony looks dull yellow-orange to brown-orange, while the true body (thallus) is reduced to faint whitish-yellow films or tiny areoles barely a tenth of a millimetre wide, most obvious around the outer margin. The apothecia—reproductive cups in which spores are produced—are biatorine in form, meaning their margin is built solely from fungal tissue and is the same colour as the disc. They measure 0.2–0.4 mm in diameter, sit flush with or slightly above the substrate once mature, and often merge into tight clusters. In vertical section the marginal cortex reaches about 70 μm thick at the flanks but tapers sharply near the base. The colourless hymenium stands 70 to 75 μm high; its parallel hyphae (paraphyses) bulge at the tips and are packed with oil cells four to five μm across, a character that becomes more obvious when the tissue is treated with potassium hydroxide solution. Each ascus normally bears eight broadly ellipsoid spores 9–12 × 6–7 μm that are divided once across the middle; the internal wall thickens only modestly. Chemical spot tests on the upper cortex give a deep purple reaction with K, indicating the presence of the orange anthraquinone compound parietin, with minor associated pigments that shift the tint towards brownish in older parts.

== Habitat and distribution ==
The species is confined to temperate south-eastern Australia, with confirmed records from scattered sites in Victoria and Tasmania. It colonises both siliceous rocks such as dolerite and basalt and calcareous substrates including weathered limestone, favouring rather sheltered faces where moisture lingers yet light remains plentiful. Collections range from near sea level to about six hundred metres elevation. Its occurrence is described as sparse to occasional. Historical herbarium material labelled as the European C. lithophila or as epilithic (rock-dwelling) forms of Athallia pyracea and Athallia holocarpa (both previously in Caloplaca) may in fact represent C. magnussoniana, so its true distribution on Australia's southern mainland and adjacent islands is probably wider than the handful of documented localities implies.

== See also ==
- List of Caloplaca species
