= Xanthocarpia jerramungupensis =

Scientific classification
- Kingdom: Fungi
- Division: Ascomycota
- Class: Lecanoromycetes
- Order: Teloschistales
- Family: Teloschistaceae
- Genus: Xanthocarpia
- Species: X. jerramungupensis

Binomial name
- Xanthocarpia jerramungupensis (S.Y.Kondr., Kärnefelt & Elix) S.Y.Kondr., Kärnefelt, A.Thell, Elix, Jung Kim, A.S.Kondr. & Hur (2013)
- Holotype site: Jerramungup, Western Australia

Synonyms
- Caloplaca jerramungupensis S.Y.Kondr., Kärnefelt & Elix (2009)

Species of lichen

Xanthocarpia jerramungupensis is a species of terricolous (ground-dwelling), crustose lichen in the family Teloschistaceae. Found in Australia, it was formally described as a new species in 2009 by lichenologists Sergey Kondratyuk, Ingvar Kärnefelt, and John Elix; they classified it in the genus Caloplaca. The type specimen was collected from Jerramungup, Western Australia, where it was found growing among scrub on sandy soil. The species epithet refers to the type locality, which, at the time of its original publication, was the only known location of this lichen. Kondratyuk and colleagues transferred the taxon to the genus Xanthocarpia in 2013, as part of comprehensive molecular phylogenetics-led restructuring of the Teloschistaceae.
