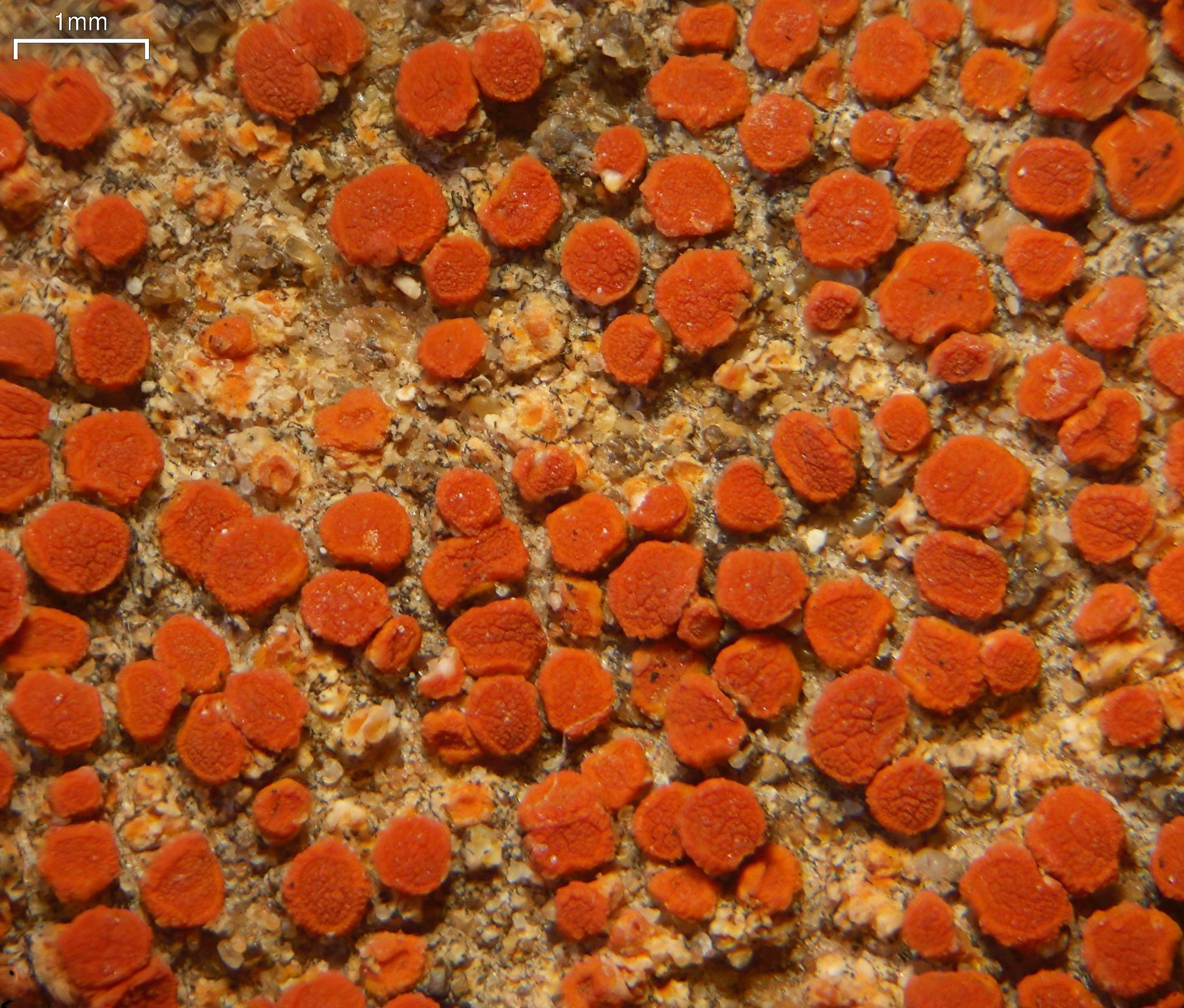
- Xanthocarpia crenulatella

Scientific classification
- Kingdom: Fungi
- Division: Ascomycota
- Class: Lecanoromycetes
- Order: Teloschistales
- Family: Teloschistaceae
- Genus: Xanthocarpia; A.Massal. & De Not. (1853)

Type species
- Xanthocarpia ochracea (Schaer.) A.Massal. & De Not. (1853)

= Xanthocarpia =

Genus of lichen-forming fungi

Xanthocarpia is a genus of mostly crustose lichens in the family Teloschistaceae. It has 12 species with a largely Northern Hemisphere distribution.

== Taxonomy ==
The genus was originally circumscribed in 1859 by Abramo Bartolommeo Massalongo and Giuseppe De Notaris, with Xanthocarpia ochracea as the type species. This species has tetralocular ascospores (i.e. divided into 4 chambers).

== Description ==
Xanthocarpia has a thallus that is either crust-like (crustose) or like a shield or plate attached on the lower surface at a single central point (peltate). In some cases, the thallus is absent; in all cases, a cortex is absent. The lichen contains anthraquinones compounds. Xanthocarpia species often have apothecia, which are coloured yellow to orange. These apothecia are zeorine, meaning that the proper exciple (the ring-shaped layer surrounding the hymenium) is enclosed in the thalline exciple. Pycnidia can be present or absent; the conidia have a bacilliform to narrowly ellipsoid shape.

== Species ==
Most Xanthocarpia species occur in the Northern Hemisphere. Several are found in southeastern Europe, with a collective distribution extending from the Mediterranean to the Arctic. As of January 2026, Species Fungorum (in the Catalogue of Life) accepts 14 species of Xanthocarpia.

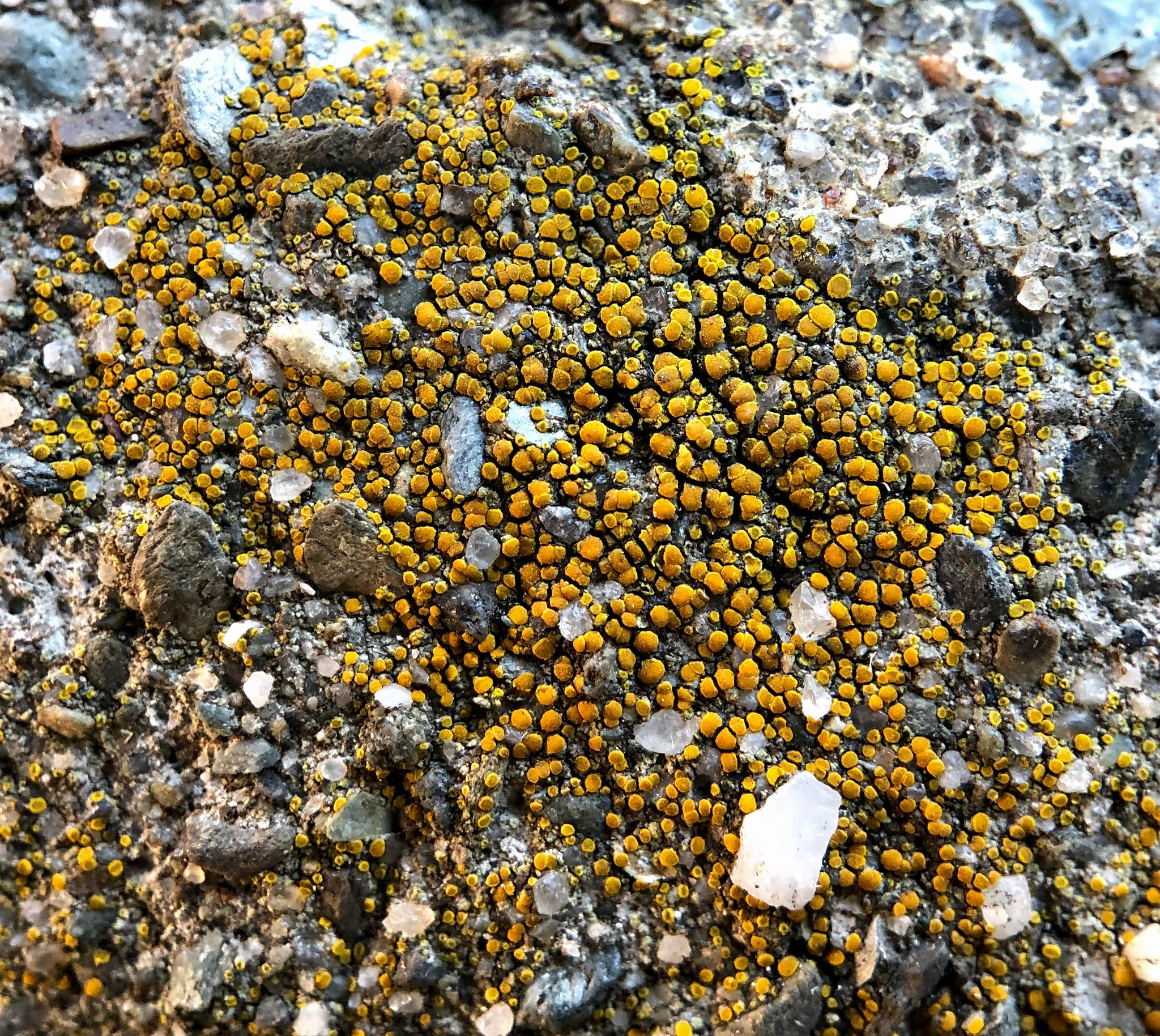
Xanthocarpia feracissima

- Xanthocarpia aquensis (Houmeau & Cl.Roux) Frödén, Arup & Søchting (2013)
- Xanthocarpia bisagnonis (B.de Lesd.) Cl.Roux (2024)
- Xanthocarpia borysthenica (Khodos. & S.Y.Kondr.) Frödén, Arup & Søchting (2013)
- Xanthocarpia crenulatella (Nyl.) Frödén, Arup & Søchting (2013)
- Xanthocarpia diffusa (Vondrák & Llimona) Frödén, Arup & Søchting (2013)
- Xanthocarpia epigaea (Søchting, Huneck & Etayo) Frödén, Arup & Søchting (2013)
- Xanthocarpia erichansenii (S.Y.Kondr., A.Thell, Kärnefelt & Elix) Frödén, Arup & Søchting (2013)
- Xanthocarpia feracissima (H.Magn.) Frödén, Arup & Søchting (2013)
- Xanthocarpia ferrarii (Bagl.) Frödén, Arup & Søchting (2013)
- Xanthocarpia fulva (Harm.) Nav.-Ros. & Cl.Roux (2023)
- Xanthocarpia interfulgens (Nyl.) Frödén, Arup & Søchting (2013)
- Xanthocarpia jerramungupensis (S.Y.Kondr., Kärnefelt & Elix) S.Y.Kondr., Kärnefelt, A.Thell, Elix, Jung Kim, A.S.Kondr. & Hur (2013)
- Xanthocarpia lacteoides (Nav.-Ros. & Hladun) Nav.-Ros. (2022)
- Xanthocarpia marmorata (Bagl.) Frödén, Arup & Søchting (2013)
- Xanthocarpia ochracea (Schaer.) A.Massal. & De Not. (1853)
- Xanthocarpia tominii (Savicz) Frödén, Arup & Søchting (2013)
