= Xanthocarpia erichansenii =

Scientific classification
- Kingdom: Fungi
- Division: Ascomycota
- Class: Lecanoromycetes
- Order: Teloschistales
- Family: Teloschistaceae
- Genus: Xanthocarpia
- Species: X. erichansenii

Binomial name
- Xanthocarpia erichansenii (S.Y.Kondr., A.Thell, Kärnefelt & Elix) Frödén, Arup & Søchting (2013)
- Holotype site: Head of Søndre Strømfjord, SW Greenland

Synonyms
- Caloplaca erichansenii S.Y.Kondr., A.Thell, Kärnefelt & Elix (2009)

Species of lichen

Xanthocarpia erichansenii is a species of terricolous (ground-dwelling), crustose lichen in the family Teloschistaceae. It is found in southwest Greenland, where it grows on loess (a type of soil) among mosses.

== Taxonomy ==
The lichen was first formally described in 2009 by the lichenologists Sergey Kondratyuk, Arne Thell, Ingvar Kärnefelt, and John Elix; it was initially classified in the genus Caloplaca. The species epithet honours the Danish lichenologist Eric Steen Hansen, who, according to the authors, "has made enormous contributions to our knowledge of lichens in Greenland". Patrik Frödén and colleagues transferred the taxon to the genus Xanthocarpia in 2013.

== Description ==
Xanthocarpia erichansenii features a thallus that typically measures between 3 and 15 mm in width. The thallus is generally composed of tiny, scattered areoles that are convex in shape and range from yellow to a dull yellow-orange colour. These areoles are mostly rounded, varying in size from about 0.3 to 1.2 mm in width, or occasionally elongated up to 1.5 mm in length. The surface of these areoles is almost entirely covered by a mass of soredia, which are coarse, powdery reproductive structures measuring 60–100 μm in width. These soredia often appear eroded and have a dull brownish-orange hue. Additionally, the thallus sometimes has smaller powdery spots, about 30–50 μm wide, which are partly dull reddish-orange.

Apothecia rarely occur in this species, but when they do they can be numerous, with 2 to 7 typically found per areole. They measure 0.4 to 0.9 mm in diameter and up to 0.3 mm in thickness. The apothecia are initially lecanorine in form, meaning they have a noticeable thalline margin, but can become biatorine, with this margin becoming less distinct. The thalline margin is usually bright yellow or yellow-green, about 0.05 to 0.1 mm wide, but may become excluded or covered by an expanded true exciple that can be up to 0.2 mm wide. The disc of the apothecia is flat and varies in colour from dull dark orange to brownish-orange.

The thalline exciple is 100–150 μm thick and lacks a cortical layer, while the true exciple varies in thickness, being thicker at the base and thinner towards the edges. The hymenium, the tissue layer containing the spore-producing asci, is 80–90 μm high. The paraphyses (sterile filaments within the hymenium) gradually swell towards the tips, measuring 5–6 μm in diameter.

== Habitat and distribution ==
Xanthocarpia erichansenii is commonly found growing on exposed loess, a type of soil made of wind-blown silt. It typically grows among mosses and is often found in the company of various other lichen and moss species. These companion species include Flavocetraria nivalis, Peltigera rufescens, Physconia muscigena, Fulgensia bracteata, Diploschistes muscorum, and several species of the genus Catapyrenium. Xanthocarpia erichansenii inhabits various locations in Greenland, although its occurrences are relatively scattered across the region.
