= Lichinodium ahlneri =

Scientific classification
- Domain: Eukaryota
- Kingdom: Fungi
- Division: Ascomycota
- Class: Leotiomycetes
- Order: Lichinodiales
- Family: Lichinodiaceae
- Genus: Lichinodium
- Species: L. ahlneri

Binomial name
- Lichinodium ahlneri Henssen (1963)

Species of fungus

Lichinodium ahlneri is a species of filamentous lichen belonging to the family Lichinodiaceae. Described as a new species in 1963 by Aino Henssen, the specific epithet honours Swedish lichenologist Sten Ahlner.

It is native to Northern Europe and Northern America.
