= Xanthocarpia diffusa =

Scientific classification
- Kingdom: Fungi
- Division: Ascomycota
- Class: Lecanoromycetes
- Order: Teloschistales
- Family: Teloschistaceae
- Genus: Xanthocarpia
- Species: X. diffusa

Binomial name
- Xanthocarpia diffusa (Vondrák & Llimona) Frödén, Arup & Søchting (2013)
- Holotype: near Buknari, Georgia

Synonyms
- Caloplaca diffusa Vondrák & Llimona (2011)

Species of lichen

Xanthocarpia diffusa is a species of saxicolous (rock-dwelling) crustose lichen in the family Teloschistaceae. First described in 2011 from coastal rocks in Georgia, it is characterised by its yellow to greyish thallus with distinctive diffuse margins often bordered by a pale prothallus. The species primarily occurs along coastal areas of the Black Sea region, with some isolated populations in the Mediterranean region, where it grows on damp siliceous rocks, particularly around seepage zones and in areas exposed to sea spray. Though initially described in the genus Caloplaca, molecular phylogenetics studies led to its transfer to Xanthocarpia in 2013.

== Taxonomy ==
It was described as a new species in 2011 by the lichenologists Jan Vondrák and Xavier Llimona i Pagès. The species was first discovered on coastal rocks near Buknari, Batumi, in Georgia's Adjara region, where the holotype specimen was collected in April 2007. Its specific epithet diffusa refers to the distinctive diffuse margin of its thallus, a characteristic that helps distinguish it from similar species. Molecular analysis placed it within a well-supported monophyletic group in the Teloschistaceae, though its precise phylogenetic position remained initially unclear due to the complexity of relationships within this group. Patrik Frödén and colleagues transferred it to the genus Xanthocarpia in 2013 as part of a large-scale molecular phylogenetics-informed restructuring of the Teloschistaceae.

== Description ==
Xanthocarpia diffusa is a crustose lichen characterised by its yellow to ochre-yellow or greyish-yellow thallus (main body) that forms patches up to several cm in diameter. A distinctive feature is its diffuse thallus margin, which is often bordered by a white or pale grey prothallus (a preliminary growth stage of the lichen). The thallus is composed of angular areoles (small, polygonal segments) measuring 170–1100 micrometres (μm) in diameter and up to 150 μm thick. While it lacks a true cortex (protective outer layer), it sometimes develops a thin alveolate (honeycombed) cortex up to 20 μm thick.

The reproductive structures (apothecia) are zeorine in form, meaning they have both proper and thalline margins. They measure 0.4–0.7 mm in diameter, occasionally reaching up to 1 mm, with a pale to dark orange disc. The proper margin contains yellow-orange pigments and is 30–150 μm thick, while the thalline margin is also pigmented yellow and often has a crenulated (wavy or scalloped) edge.

The spores (ascospores) are ellipsoid, measuring 11–17.7 by 5–9 μm, with thin septa (internal walls) 2–3.7 μm thick. The species also produces asexual reproductive structures called pycnidia, which appear as orange spots up to 170 μm in diameter and produce tiny asexual spores (conidia) that are narrowly ellipsoid or shortly rod-shaped, measuring 2.7–3.2 by 1.0–1.7 μm.

When tested with chemical spot tests, both the thallus and apothecia show negative reactions with C and P, but turn K+ (purple). Under ultraviolet light, they fluoresce orange. The main secondary metabolite (lichen product) present is parietin, with trace amounts of other related substances.

== Habitat, distribution, and ecology ==
Xanthocarpia diffusa shows a distinct preference for damp environments on siliceous (silicon-containing) rocks, particularly in coastal areas. It commonly grows on coastal cliffs and around seepage crevices where moisture is regularly available. The species can also be found in inland locations, but these occurrences are relatively rare and typically restricted to periodically inundated areas, such as the beds of seasonal streams.

The species is primarily documented in the Black Sea region, where it occurs along the coasts of Bulgaria, Georgia, Russia, Turkey, and Ukraine. In the Mediterranean region, it is notably scarcer, with only isolated populations recorded from northeastern Spain and Greece (Peloponnese). The limited inland populations have been found in Bulgaria's Eastern Rhodopes mountains.

Unlike many related species in its family that prefer calcareous (limestone) substrates, X. diffusa is primarily found on siliceous rocks. This substrate specificity, combined with its requirement for periodic moisture, makes it an example of habitat specialisation within the genus. In its coastal habitats, it often occurs in the supralittoral zone – the area above the high tide line that receives regular spray from waves but is not submerged. The species can form extensive patches in suitable habitats, suggesting it can compete effectively with other organisms when environmental conditions are favourable. Its presence in both Black Sea and Mediterranean environments indicates some tolerance for different climatic conditions, though it appears to be more successful in the Black Sea region.
