= Ionaspis aptrootii =

Scientific classification
- Kingdom: Fungi
- Division: Ascomycota
- Class: Lecanoromycetes
- Order: Baeomycetales
- Family: Hymeneliaceae
- Genus: Ionaspis
- Species: I. aptrootii

Binomial name
- Ionaspis aptrootii Poengs. & Lumbsch (2021)
- Holotype: Varirata, New Guinea

Synonyms
- Ionaspis tropica Aptroot (1997)

Species of lichen

Ionaspis aptrootii is a species of saxicolous (rock-dwelling), crustose lichen in the family Hymeneliaceae. It occurs in New Guinea and Thailand.

== Taxonomy ==
Ionaspis aptrootii is a replacement name for the taxon name Ionaspis tropica, which was published by the Dutch lichenologist André Aptroot in 1997. That name was not validly published, as it was predated by another taxon of the same name, described by Lincoln Ware Riddle in 1920. The new species epithet honours Aptroot, who originally described the species. The type specimen was collected by Aptroot in Varirata National Park, Papua New Guinea, where he found it growing on conglomerate rock at an elevation of 700 m (2,300 ft). It has since been recorded in Thailand.

== Description ==
Ionaspis aptrootii has a smooth, cream-white thallus up to 1 mm thick and encircled with a black prothallus. It has angular to star-shaped (stellate), dark reddish-brown apothecia (fruiting bodies) that are immersed in the thallus, and measure 0.2–0.4 mm wide. Its ascospores, which number eight per ascus, are hyaline and ellipsoid, do not have septa, and measure 11–14 by 4–5 μm. The stellate, dark reddish-brown apothecia distinguish this species from others in the genus Ionaspis.
