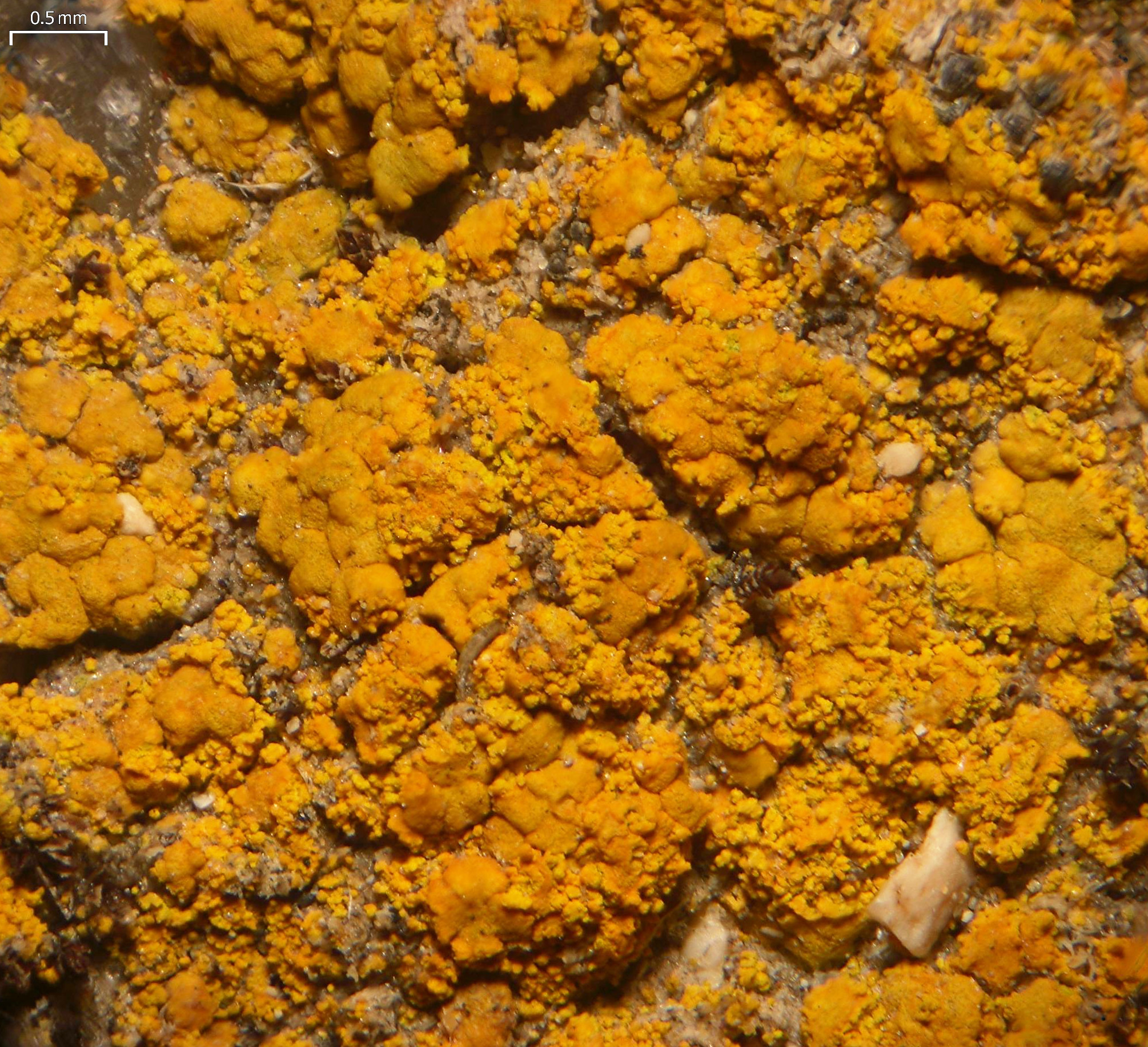

Scientific classification
- Kingdom: Fungi
- Division: Ascomycota
- Class: Lecanoromycetes
- Order: Teloschistales
- Family: Teloschistaceae
- Genus: Xanthocarpia
- Species: X. tominii

Binomial name
- Xanthocarpia tominii (Savicz) Frödén, Arup & Søchting (2013)

Synonyms
- Caloplaca tominii Savicz (1930); Gasparrinia tominii Savicz (1930); Callopisma tominii Savicz ex Zahlbr. (1931)

= Xanthocarpia tominii =

Species of lichen-forming fungus

Xanthocarpia tominii is a species of lichen-forming fungus in the family Teloschistaceae. It is a crustose lichen with an orange to greenish-orange thallus that produces soredia, and is unusual in its group for growing on soil rather than rock. It occurs mainly in semi-desert and Arctic habitats in Russia, western North America, and Greenland.

== Taxonomy ==
This species was first described by Vsevolod Savich in 1930 as Placodium tominii, based on material collected in Astrakhan Province in Russia near Lake Baskunchak. Clifford Wetmore noted that Savicz also listed the names Caloplaca tominii and Callopisma tominii as synonyms, so the formal transfer to Caloplaca was not made until Sten Ahlner published the combination Caloplaca tominii in 1949. He further pointed out that Ahlner's treatment was sufficient under the nomenclatural rules then in force, even though it did not give the full direct citation that later became standard practice.

In Wetmore's 2001 treatment of the Caloplaca citrina group in North and Central America, C. tominii was regarded as a close relative of C. citrina and other yellow to orange sorediate species. He wrote that species in this group are often difficult to classify because they are usually sterile and therefore offer relatively few characters for determining their broader relationships, a problem that he suggested would ultimately need molecular study to resolve. Within that group, however, he considered C. tominii distinguishable by its usual occurrence on soil rather than rock, its generally convex areoles, and its infrequent production of apothecia.

The species was reclassified in the genus Xanthocarpia in 2013, as part of a molecular phylogenetics-informed restructuring of the family Teloschistaceae.

== Description ==
Xanthocarpia tominii is a crustose lichen with a thallus that is usually egg-yellow to orange-yellow, but may also appear brownish, light yellow, or greenish-orange. It is made up of small, rounded areoles that may be scattered or fused into a larger crust. These areoles are usually convex and only slightly lobed. The larger ones, before they become sorediate, can be somewhat shield-shaped, while the smaller ones are attached directly by hyphae. Lobes are usually absent, although older specimens may develop small marginal lobes. There is no distinct prothallus.

The thallus produces abundant soredia, usually along the raised margins of the areoles and sometimes across their upper surface as well, giving older parts a more powdery appearance. Apothecia (fruiting bodies), when present, are very rare, small, and flat, with a dull orange to reddish-brown disc that may darken with age, and a thick margin that is often also sorediate. The internal tissues include a thin cortex, a continuous algal layer, and a dense medulla. The thallus gives a red reaction with potassium hydroxide solution (K).

== Habitat and distribution ==
In North America, Xanthocarpia tominii grows on soil rather than rock, occurring on both calcareous and non-calcareous substrates in dry, open habitats. It is found chiefly in western North America and Arctic localities including Greenland, and has been recorded in southwestern Yukon on loess deposits in open Artemisia steppe. The species is adapted to dry, exposed, base-rich sites in regions with a strongly continental climate, which helps explain its occurrence in semi-desert habitats. Its usual growth on soil helps distinguish it from the more rock-inhabiting Flavoplaca citrina.
