= Lichinodium =

Scientific classification
- Domain: Eukaryota
- Kingdom: Fungi
- Division: Ascomycota
- Class: Leotiomycetes
- Order: Lichinodiales; M.Prieto, M.Schultz, Olariaga & Wedin (2019)
- Family: Lichinodiaceae; M.Prieto, M.Schultz, Olariaga & Wedin (2019)
- Genus: Lichinodium; Nyl. (1875)

Type species
- Lichinodium sirosiphoideum Nyl. (1875)

Species
- L. ahlneri L. canadense L. saxicola L. sirosiphoideum

Genus of lichens

Lichinodium is a genus of filamentous lichens. It is the only genus in the family Lichinodiaceae, itself the only member of the order Lichinodiales. Lichinodium has four species. Previously considered part of the class Lichinomycetes, molecular phylogenetic analysis revealed that Lichinodium represents a unique lineage in the Leotiomycetes—the first known group of lichen-forming fungi in this class.

== Taxonomy ==
The genus Lichinodium is typified by Lichinodium sirosiphoideum, first described in 1875 by William Nylander. Aino Henssen added three species to the genus about a century later.

Lichinodium used to be classified in the Lichinomycetes, but molecular phylogenetic analysis published in 2018 showed that the genus was incorrectly classified there, and that instead it represents a new lichen-forming lineage in the superclass Sordariomyceta (containing the (Leotiomycetes, Laboulbeniomycetes, and the Sordariomycetes), a major fungal group that was not previously known to have any lichenised species. Lichinodium has a sister taxon relationship with the family Leotiaceae, and thus the order Lichinodiales is placed in the class Leotiomycetes.

Studies using transmission electron microscopy also showed that in Lichinodium, there are no haustoria (microscopic root-like structures) made in the interface between mycobiont and cyanobiont; this difference further distinguishes Lichinodium from the Lichinomycetes.

== Description ==
Lichinodium lichens form tiny pads of branched filaments comprising threads of cyanobionts surrounded by hyphal cells forming a collar. The apothecia are brownish and gelatinous, with an indistinct proper and thalline margin. Two species are known to produce asexual conidiomata. The photobiont partner of Lichinodium is from Rhizonema, a genus of filamentous cyanobacteria in family Nostocaceae. Lichinodium species generally prefer cool, humid environments, where they grow on conifer twigs, tree trunks, or rocks, sometimes along with or overgrowing other mosses and lichens.

== Species ==
- Lichinodium ahlneri Henssen (1963)
- Lichinodium canadense Henssen (1968)
- Lichinodium saxicola Henssen (1974)
- Lichinodium sirosiphoideum Nyl. (1875)
