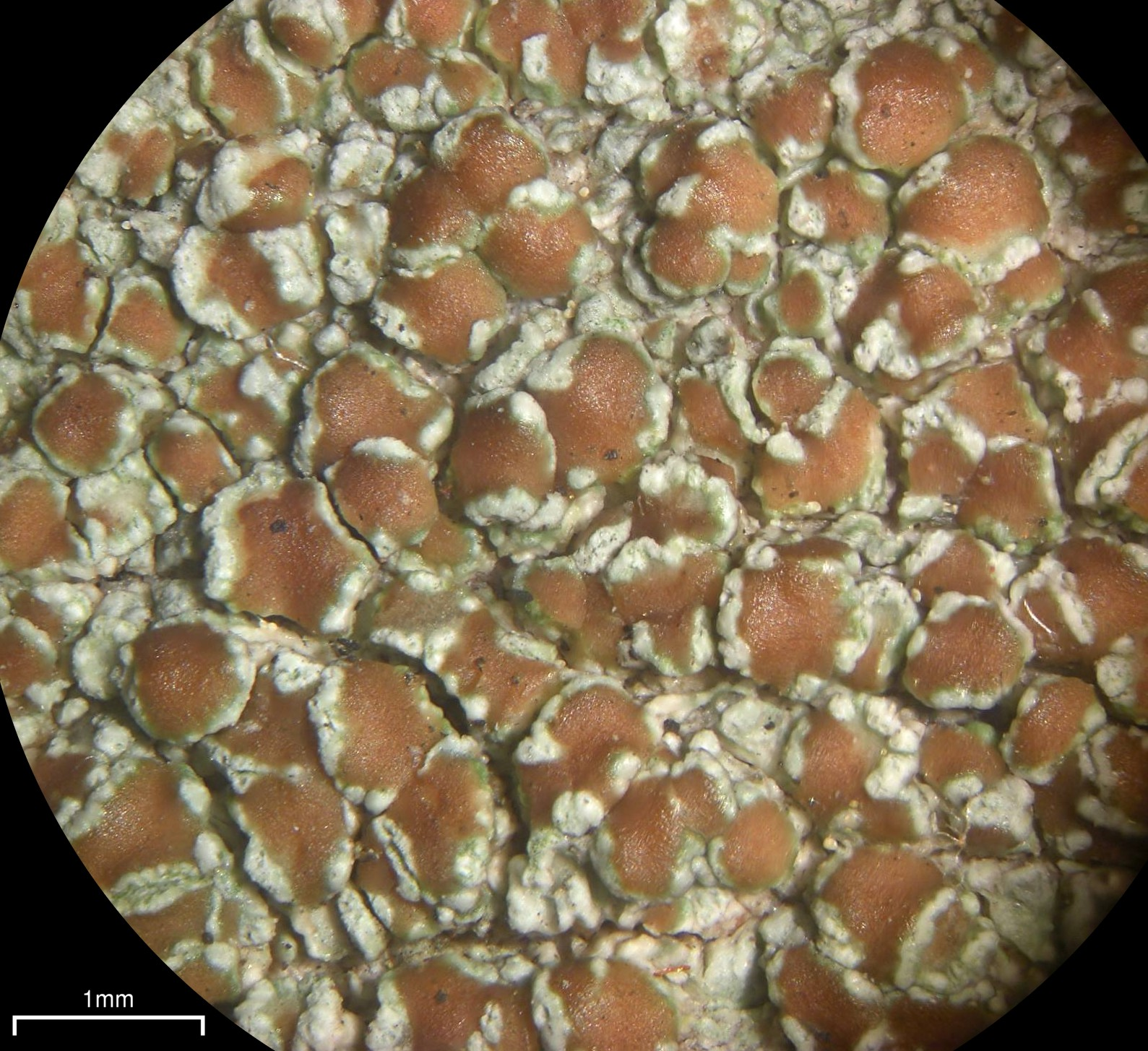

Scientific classification
- Domain: Eukaryota
- Kingdom: Fungi
- Division: Ascomycota
- Class: Lecanoromycetes
- Order: Lecanorales
- Family: Lecanoraceae
- Genus: Lecanora
- Species: L. cinereofusca

Binomial name
- Lecanora cinereofusca H.Magn. (1932)

= Lecanora cinereofusca =

Species of lichen

Lecanora cinereofusca is a species of corticolous (bark-dwelling) crustose lichen in the family Lecanoraceae.

== Taxonomy ==
It was described as new to science in 1932 by the Swedish lichenologist Adolf Hugo Magnusson. Irwin Brodo proposed the variety Lecanora cinereofusca var. appalachensis in 1984; this taxon is now considered synonymous with Lecanora saxigena.

== Description ==
Lecanora cinereofusca has a thallus (the main body of the lichen) that is continuous or irregularly cracked (rimose), varying from pale to medium grey in colour with a smooth to warted surface. The prothallus (the initial fungal growth area) is either absent or appears black.

The reproductive structures (apothecia) measure 0.7–1.5 mm in diameter and are initially immersed in the thallus, sometimes becoming sessile (attached directly to the surface) as they mature. The thalline margin (the rim around the apothecium derived from the thallus) is well-developed and persistent, with a coarsely scalloped to almost toothed edge that becomes wavy with age. This margin is white or a paler grey than the surrounding thallus and contains very large crystals that do not dissolve in potassium hydroxide solution (K).

The disc of the apothecium is flat to slightly convex and orange-brown or red-brown in colour. The epithecium (the uppermost layer of the apothecium) is red-brown, containing coarse granules that are also present on the surface. These granules do not dissolve in K but turn orange when treated with para-phenylenediamine (Pd+), forming crystals in the process.

The hymenium (the spore-producing layer) is 60–85 μm tall. The paraphyses (sterile filaments among the reproductive cells) are 2–3 μm in diameter, sparsely branched and interconnected, with tips that are not or only slightly swollen. Ascospores (sexual spores produced in asci) made by L. cinereofusca are broadly ellipsoidal, typically measuring 10–14.5 by 7–8.5 μm. The conidia (asexual spores) are cylindrical and 10–14 μm long.

When subjected to chemical spot tests, the thallus is C−, K+ (yellow), Pd−, and fluoresces mauve-purple under ultraviolet light (UV+). Both the thalline margin and epithecium turn yellow-orange when treated with Pd. The lichen contains several secondary metabolites including atranorin, pannarin, and sometimes placodialic acid and roccellic acid.

== Habitat and distribution ==
In the United Kingdom, where it is considered very rare, Lecanora cinereofusca grows on birch and willow trees. It was recorded for the first time in the Czech Republic in 2014, although it is considered extinct there as it is known only from a single historical collection from an old-growth beech forest. In the Alps, the lichen has been recorded growing on various hosts: Acer pseudoplatanus, Abies alba, Alnus, and Salix.

== See also ==
- List of Lecanora species
