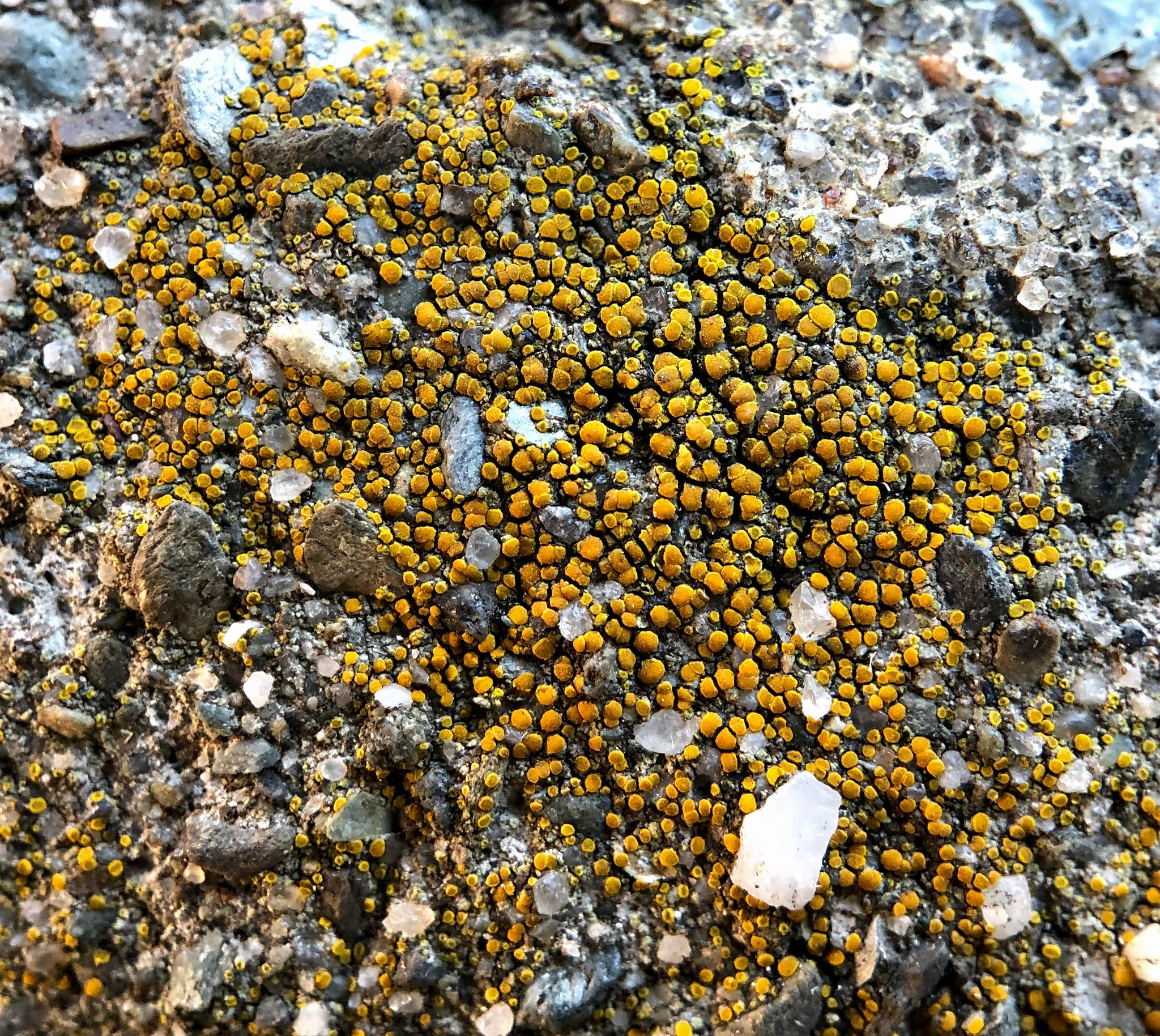

Conservation status
- Secure (NatureServe)

Scientific classification
- Domain: Eukaryota
- Kingdom: Fungi
- Division: Ascomycota
- Class: Lecanoromycetes
- Order: Teloschistales
- Family: Teloschistaceae
- Genus: Xanthocarpia
- Species: X. feracissima

Binomial name
- Xanthocarpia feracissima (H.Magn.) Frödén, Arup & Søchting (2013)

Synonyms
- Caloplaca feracissima H.Magn. (1953)

= Xanthocarpia feracissima =

Species of lichen

Xanthocarpia feracissima is a species of saxicolous, crustose lichen in the family Teloschistaceae. It was first formally described as a new species in 1953 by Swedish lichenologist Adolf Hugo Magnusson, as a member of the genus Caloplaca. The type specimen was collected in 1939 by John Walter Thomson in Lake Koshkonong, Wisconsin. In the original description, Magnusson notes a similarity to the lichen now known as Gyalolechia flavovirescens, but distinguishes the new species by its lack of a visible thallus, the sordid-reddish color of its discs, and the "unusually narrow" septa of the spores. Patrik Frödén, Ulf Arup, and Ulrik Søchting transferred the taxon to Xanthocarpia in 2013, following molecular phylogenetic analysis of the family Teloschistaceae.

The lichen occurs in the eastern United States and Canada. In North America, a common name for the species is "sidewalk firedot lichen". It is very common on cement and mortar, particularly on sidewalks that are not commonly used. Despite the nearly imperceptible thallus, the tiny apothecia can grow so profusely so as discolor large areas of sidewalks yellow. The ability of Xanthocarpia feracissima to grow on rock surfaces, however, has led to instances where the species has damaged marble; in one documented case of the restoration of a statue, the lichen penetrated up to 10 mm (3/8 in) into the stone along larger cracks and 0.05 mm (1/500 in) beneath loose surface crystals, leading to crumbling of the marble surface.
