= Greta Sernander-DuRietz =

Swedish woman lichenologist

- Born: Greta Sernander; 1 November 1897
- Died: 14 May 1981 (aged 83)
- Known for: lichenology; floristics; biogeography
- Spouse: Gustaf Einar Du Rietz
- Children: 4
- Parents: Rutger (father); Signe Lindhagen (mother)
- Scientific career
- Fields: lichenology

Greta Sernander-Du Rietz was a lichenologist, specialising in their ecology and biogeography as well as making collections of specimens. She was the first Swedish woman in this field of biology. She was active from around 1911 until 1928, and then from the early 1950s until the 1980s.

== Life and career ==
Greta Sernander-Du Rietz was born 1 November 1897 to Rutger and Signe (née Lindhagen) Sernader. Her father was a prominent member of the Swedish scientific community as professor of plant biology at Uppsala University from 1908 until 1931. She did not matriculate from school or study at university, apart from attending her father's seminars. However, from these and accompanying him on collecting expeditions, she became interested and knowledgeable about lichens. Her interests developed into floristics, plant geography and plant ecology and resulted in her first scientific publication in 1919. In the 1920s she focused on phytogeography of several lichen species.

In 1924 she married the lichenologist Gustaf Einar Du Rietz who she had known for many years, and with whom she had collected lichen specimens. He followed her father as professor of plant biology at Uppsala University. They had a total of 4 children together, one of whom died at a young age shortly before she went with her husband to New Zealand where they made extensive collections of lichens in the company of local scientists as part of the Swedish Australasian Botanical Expedition of 1926–27, a seven-month research tour of various locations. They also visited Australia and collected some specimens there. She prepared, drew and took photographs of the specimens for Du Rietz's publications about their discoveries. This expedition was the start of her life-long interest in the lichens of New Zealand but the end of her scientific work as they had further children together. However, following a few difficult years, she divorced in 1951 and resumed her research. In publications from 1957 onwards it was clear that she had resumed investigation into lichen ecology and also collecting specimens. She died 14 May 1981.

== Scientific legacy ==
In addition to her scientific publications, specimens that Sernander-Du Rietz collected are in several herbaria including lichens and flowering plants collected from 1911 onwards in the Museum of Evolution Herbarium at Uppsala University and others now held at the University of Oslo and University of Wisconsin–Madison. Her early research on lichen ecology, and collections of specimens, provide useful comparative data for more recent research such as on the ecology of lichens that grow on bark in Sweden.

The endemic at risk New Zealand lichen Pseudocyphellaria gretae (Peltigeraceae) was named after her.

== Publications ==
Scientific publications by Sernander-DuRietz include:

- Sernander, G. 1919. Några jämtländska lavfynd. Svensk Bot. Tidskr. 13 338–341.
- Sernander, G. 1922. En lindholme i Bolmen. Sveriges Natur 13 101–110.
- Sernander, G. 1923. Parmelia acetabulum (Neck.) Dub. i Skandinavien. Svensk Bot. Tidskr. 17 297–330.
- Sernander-DuRietz, G. 1926. Parmelia tiliacea, en kustlav och marin inlandsrelikt i Skandinavien. Svensk Bot. Tidskr. 20 352–365.
- Sernander-DuRietz, G. 1957. Om yttre faktorers inverkan på apotheciebildningen hos Parmelia tiliacea. Svensk Bot. Tidskr. 51 454–488.
- Sernander-DuRietz, G. 1969. Förekomsten av Physcia magnussonii Frey i Skandinavien och sydvästra Grönland. Svensk Bot. Tidskr. 63 377–386.
