= Sten Ahlner =

Swedish lichenologist (1905–1991)

- Born: 18 September 1905; Gävle, Sweden
- Died: 12 January 1991 (aged 85); Uppsala, Sweden
- Education: Uppsala University
- Scientific career
- Fields: Botany, lichenology
- Workplaces: Swedish Museum of Natural History
- Author abbrev. (botany): Ahlner

Sten Gustaf Edvard Ahlner (18 September 1905 – 12 January 1991) was a Swedish lichenologist.

== Biography ==
Sten Ahlner was born on 18 September in Gävle, Sweden, the son of teachers Oscar Ahlner and Anna (née Karlsson). After matriculating with high marks in 1924, he entered Uppsala University. He graduated from this university in 1930 with a filosofie magister in botany, zoology, and geography, and in 1936 with a filosofie licentiat in botany. A PhD followed in 1948, titled Utbredningstyper bland nordiska barrträdslavar ("Distribution types among Nordic coniferous lichens"), after which Ahlner was appointed docent in plant biology.

Ahlner was employed at the Botanical section of the Swedish Museum of Natural History in Stockholm from 1950 to 1971, and was also a docent in botany at Stockholm University starting in 1955. He was the editor of the journal Svensk Botanisk Tidskrift between 1952 and 1969.

Ahlner authored many papers on the lichens of the Nordic countries, with an emphasis on phytogeography and field botany, rather than taxonomy. He was known for his many journeys across Sweden, Norway, and Finland, on bicycle or by moped. On these excursions he made many scientific collections of lichens, which are now kept at the herbarium of Natur Historiska Riksmuseet. Regarding his personality, his colleague Gunnar Degelius wrote "he was good-natured and sociable, natural and reliable; in his investigations very solid but conservative (as in other things)". Ahlner died in Uppsala on 12 January 1991 after a few years of frailty caused by a hip ailment and a heart condition.

== Eponyms ==
Several taxa have been named after Ahlner: Lecidea ahlneri Räsänen (1939); Lichinodium ahlneri Henssen (1963); Microcalicium ahlneri Tibell (1978); and Pannaria ahlneri P.M.Jørg. (1978).

== Selected publications ==
- Ahlner, S. (1931). "Evernia divaricata (L.) Ach. funnen med soredier". Botaniska Notiser. 1931: 219–221.
- Ahlner, S. (1937). "Flechten aus Nordfinnland". Annales Botanici Societatis Zoologicae-Botanicae Fennicae Vanamo (in German). 9: 1–47.
- Ahlner, S. (1948). "Utbredningstyper bland nordiska barrträdslavar. (Verbreitungstypen unter fennoskandische Nadelbaumflechten)". Acta Phytogeographica Suecica. 22: 1–257.
- Ahlner, S. (1949). "Contributions to the lichen flora of Norway. I. Solorinella asteriscus Anzi new to Scandinavia". Svensk Botanisk Tidskrift. 43 (2–3): 157–162.
