= Rutger Sernander =

Swedish scientist (1866–1944)

Johan Rutger Sernander
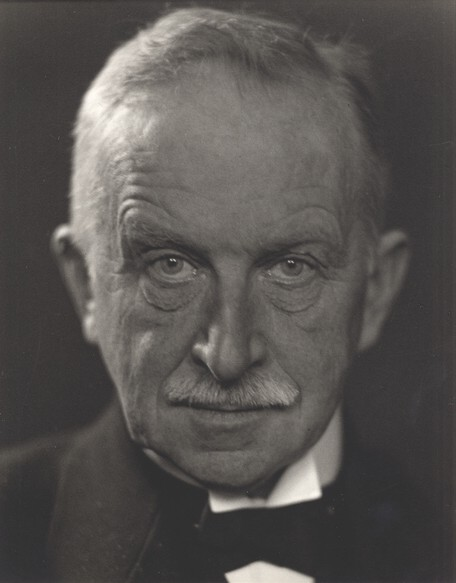
- Rutger Sernander
- Born: 2 November 1866; Viby, Närke, Sweden
- Died: 27 October 1944 (aged 77); Uppsala, Sweden
- Education: Uppsala University
- Known for: Palynology
- Spouse: Signe Lindhagen
- Children: 1
- Scientific career
- Fields: Geology, Botany, Palynology, Archaeology
- Workplaces: Uppsala University

Johan Rutger Sernander (2 November 1866 – 27 October 1944) was a Swedish botanist, geologist and archaeologist. He was one of the founders of the study of palynology which would later be developed by Lennart von Post, as well as a pioneer in the early Swedish natural conservation and ecology movements. He was among other societies a member of the Royal Swedish Academy of Sciences, the Royal Swedish Academy of Letters, History and Antiquities and Norwegian Academy of Science and Letters. Sernander was one of the founders of the Swedish Society for Nature Conservation in 1909, as well as its chairman during a number of the first years.

He was professor of plant biology at Uppsala University from 1908 until 1931.

He was married to Signe Lindhagen and they had one daughter, Greta Sernander-DuRietz.

Lichens named after him include Leptogium sernanderi DuRietz. (now Leptogium rivulare), which he found around 1914 but the type specimen was probably collected later by his daughter.

== See also ==
- Blytt–Sernander system
