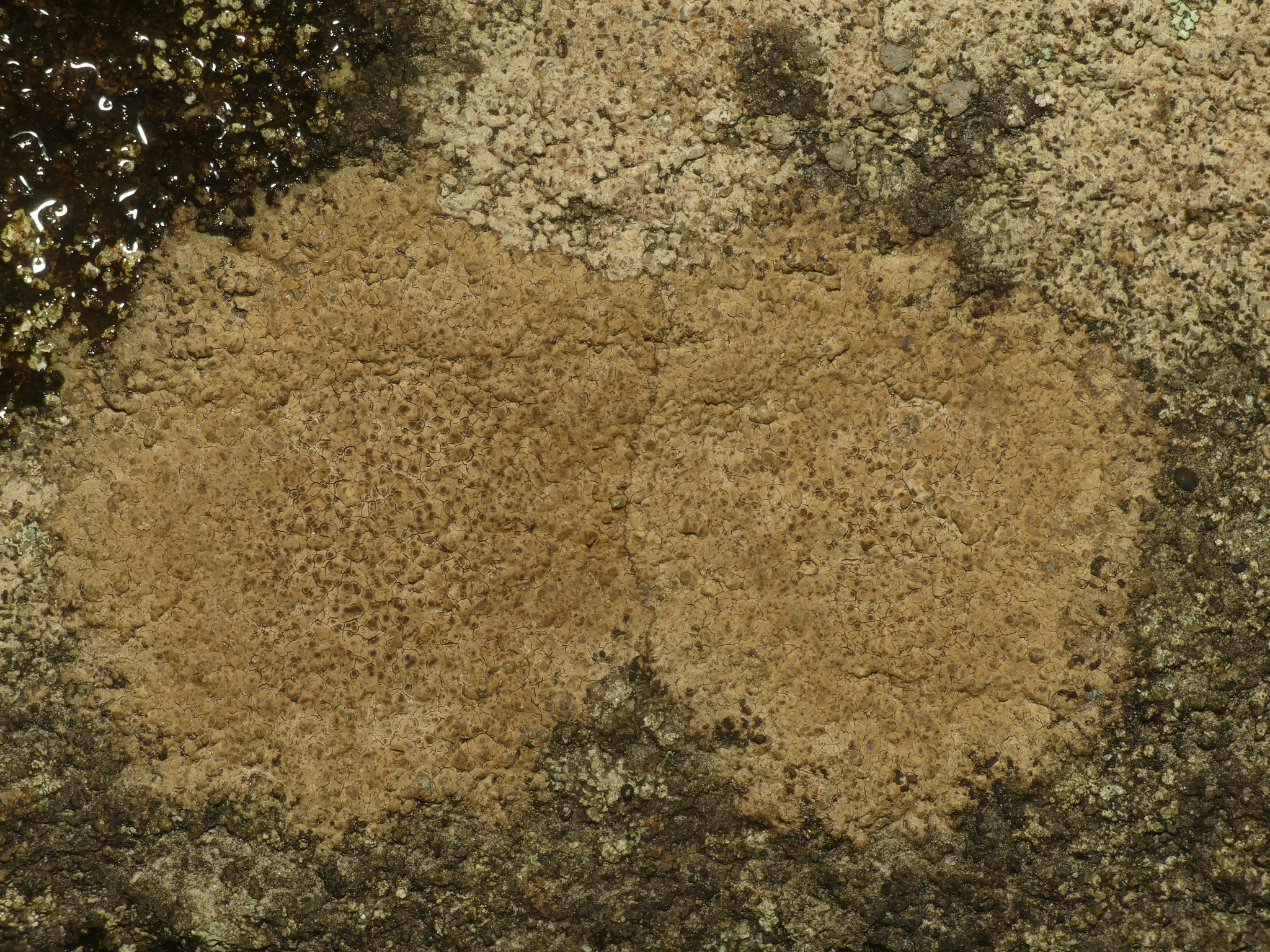
- Ionaspis lacustris

Scientific classification
- Domain: Eukaryota
- Kingdom: Fungi
- Division: Ascomycota
- Class: Lecanoromycetes
- Order: Baeomycetales
- Family: Hymeneliaceae
- Genus: Ionaspis; Th.Fr. (1871)

Type species
- Ionaspis epulotica (Ach.) Blomb. & Forssell (1871)

Species
- I. aptrootii I. chrysophana I. kerguelensis I. lacustris I. obtecta I. odora

Synonyms
- Aphragmia Trevis. (1880); Durietzia Gyeln. (1935)

= Ionaspis =

Genus of lichens

Ionaspis is a genus of lichen-forming fungi in the family Hymeneliaceae. It contains six species of saxicolous (rock-dwelling), crustose lichens. The genus was originally circumscribed in 1871 by Theodor Magnus Fries. He segregated the genus from Aspicilia based on the presence of Trentepohlia rather than Trebouxia as the photobiont partner.

== Species ==
As of July 2023, Species Fungorum (in the Catalogue of Life) accepts 6 species of Ionaspis:

- Ionaspis aptrootii Poengs. & Lumbsch (2021) – Thailand
- Ionaspis chrysophana (Körb.) Th.Fr. (1871)
- Ionaspis kerguelensis C.W.Dodge (1948)
- Ionaspis lacustris (With.) Lutzoni (1995)
- Ionaspis obtecta (Vain.) R.Sant. (2004)
- Ionaspis odora (Ach. ex Schaer.) Th.Fr. (1871)
