= Lobariella nashii =

Scientific classification
- Kingdom: Fungi
- Division: Ascomycota
- Class: Lecanoromycetes
- Order: Peltigerales
- Family: Peltigeraceae
- Genus: Lobariella
- Species: L. nashii

Binomial name
- Lobariella nashii B.Moncada & Lücking (2013)

Species of lichen

Lobariella nashii is a species of foliose lichen in the family Peltigeraceae. This rare leafy lichen forms extensive mats up to 20 cm (8 in) across on tree trunks in high-elevation cloud forests and is distinguished by its abundant, finely branched, scale-like reproductive structures that give it a distinctively tufted appearance. Known from only two collections in upper montane rainforest, it represents one of the most recently evolved lineages within its genus and appears to be extremely rare.

== Systematics ==
Lobariella nashii was described in 2013 by Bibiana Moncada and Robert Lücking, who named the species for the American lichenologist Thomas Hawkes Nash III. It can be distinguished from the morphologically similar L. stenroosiae by its narrow, regularly branched phyllidia—leaf-like vegetative propagules that cover much of the thallus surface.

Genetic analysis using three gene regions shows that L. nashii represents an early-diverging branch, separate from a closely related group that includes L. flavomedullosa, L. subcrenulata, and the Hawaiian species L. flynniana and L. sandwicensis, highlighting its isolated evolutionary position within the genus. Relaxed-clock dating places the diversification of the L. nashii + Hawaiian clade within the past roughly 10 million years, making it one of the most recently evolved lineages in Lobariella.

== Description ==
The thallus of Lobariella nashii forms extensive mats up to about 20 cm (8 in) across on trunks and larger stems. Lobes are broad, typically 10–20 mm (0.4–0.8 in) wide and as much as 10 cm (4 in) long, with rounded or irregular tips and shallowly notched (incised) margins. When hydrated the upper surface is bright green, fading to pale gray on drying. Minute pale maculae at lobe tips develop into elongate pseudocyphellae (up to 1 mm), providing gas exchange pores.

From those pores and along surface ridges arise abundant phyllidia (scale-like propagules). They begin individually as small outgrowths, flatten into dorsiventral leaflets, and branch repeatedly in one plane, eventually measuring up to 0.2 mm wide. These propagules give the lichen a finely tufted appearance and serve as the primary means of vegetative reproduction. The lower surface is cream to pale brown, with a sparse covering of tomentum and scattered pale rhizines. Fruiting bodies (apothecia) are uncommon; when present they have irregular margins encircled by numerous phyllidia.

== Habitat and distribution ==
Lobariella nashii is known from only two collections, both in upper montane rainforest. While its full range remains uncertain, current evidence suggests it is a Neotropical high-elevation species restricted to humid cloud forest habitats.
