= Lobariella flavomedullosa =

Conservation status
- Vulnerable (IUCN 3.1)

Scientific classification
- Kingdom: Fungi
- Division: Ascomycota
- Class: Lecanoromycetes
- Order: Peltigerales
- Family: Peltigeraceae
- Genus: Lobariella
- Species: L. flavomedullosa

Binomial name
- Lobariella flavomedullosa B.Moncada, Betanc. & Lücking (2013)

Species of lichen

Lobariella flavomedullosa is a species of foliose lichen in the family Peltigeraceae. The species was first scientifically described in 2013 by researchers working in Colombia, where it grows on tree branches in high-elevation cloud forests. It is characterized by its small size, narrow ribbon-like lobes, and distinctive pale yellow inner layer that gives the species its name. Genetic studies show it is closely related to other South American and Hawaiian species, being closely related to a Hawaiian endemic clade; molecular work places Hawaiian colonisation about 1–8 millions of years ago.

== Taxonomy ==
Lobariella flavomedullosa was described in 2013 by Bibiana Moncada, Luisa Betancourt-Macuase, and Robert Lücking. The epithet highlights the lichen's pale-yellow medulla. Although superficially similar to L. angustata, it differs in having a yellow rather than white medulla and much narrower ribbon-like lobes (1.5–3 mm versus 3–5 mm wide).

A maximum-likelihood tree based on three genetic markers shows that L. flavomedullosa is sister to L. subcrenulata; together they are sister to a Hawaiian endemic clade (including L. flynniana, L. robusta, and L. sandwicensis). A molecular clock analysis places the colonisation of Hawaii at roughly 1–8 Ma, with within-Hawaii divergences around 0–2 Ma.

== Description ==
This is a small species whose tightly adherent thallus rarely exceeds 6 cm (2.4 in) across. Lobes are 1.5–3 mm (0.06–0.12 in) wide and up to 2.5 cm (1.0 in) long, branching irregularly into flat ribbons that give the thallus a delicate aspect. When dry the upper surface appears gray; when moistened it shifts to a pale yellow-brown. Small white maculae are present but seldom open into distinct pseudocyphellae. The medulla—a soft inner layer exposed in section—is pale yellow, matching the species name.

The lower surface is cream to pale yellow-brown with scant tomentum and dirty yellow-brown rhizines that anchor the lichen. Fruiting bodies (apothecia), when produced, are tiny cups up to 2 mm in diameter with gray to cream lobulate margins; they generate long, narrow ascospores.

== Habitat and distribution ==
Lobariella flavomedullosa has so far been recorded only from Colombia, where it grows on branches and twigs in upper-montane and sub-Andean cloud forests. It favors semi-shaded to semi-exposed microhabitats. Lobariella is a fairly species-rich genus in Colombia, with at least 20 species from the genus reported from there. L. flavomedullosa is one of three Lobariella species reported from the Cerro Machín volcano cloud forest in Tolima.
