= Lobariella isidiata =

Conservation status
- Least Concern (IUCN 3.1)

Scientific classification
- Kingdom: Fungi
- Division: Ascomycota
- Class: Lecanoromycetes
- Order: Peltigerales
- Family: Peltigeraceae
- Genus: Lobariella
- Species: L. isidiata

Binomial name
- Lobariella isidiata B.Moncada & Lücking (2013)

Species of lichen

Lobariella isidiata is a species of foliose lichen in the family Peltigeraceae. The species was first scientifically described in 2013 from specimens collected in montane rainforest of Colombia. It is distinguished by its bright green color when wet, small pitted surface, and characteristic dark reproductive structures (isidia) that give it a rough texture. Genetic studies suggest this lichen represents an ancient lineage that separated from its relatives millions of years ago during the Miocene period.

== Systematics ==
Lobariella isidiata was described in 2013 by Bibiana Moncada and Robert Lücking. Its epithet refers to the profusion of minute, cylindrical isidia that serve as propagules for asexual reproduction. The species differs from L. exornata in having a pitted thallus and dark, spherical (globose) isidia that arise from those depressions; chemically it belongs to chemosyndrome B ("Lobariella unidentified 3") rather than producing gyrophoric acid.

A three-locus phylogeny by Lücking and colleagues (2017) placed L. isidiata as an isolated lineage within Lobariella, well apart from both the L. ecorticata – L. stenroosiae group and the L. botryoides / L. parmelioides clade. Relaxed-clock analysis suggests that the lineage leading to L. isidiata diverged from other members of the genus during the mid-Miocene, contemporaneous with the main burst of diversification in Lobariella.

== Description ==
The thallus of L. isidiata forms patches up to about 8 cm (3.1 in) across. Lobes are 3–6 mm (0.12–0.24 in) wide with truncate tips and shallowly scalloped (crenulate) margins. When moist the upper surface is bright green, fading to pale grey on drying; it is dotted with shallow pits (foveolae) 0.3–0.8 mm across. Tiny white spots that develop into elongate pseudocyphellae (up to 2 mm long) punctuate the surface, and isidia proliferate from these pores or around the pits. The isidia begin as dark, spherical (globose bumps and later elongate into cylinders with darkened tips, giving the thallus a rough texture. The lower surface is cream to pale yellow-brown, clothed in a short felt of hairs (tomentum) and scattered white rhizines.

== Habitat and distribution ==
As of its original publication, Lobariella isidiata was known only from the type collection, gathered in upper montane rainforest in Colombia.
