= Lobariella pallidocrenulata =

Scientific classification
- Kingdom: Fungi
- Division: Ascomycota
- Class: Lecanoromycetes
- Order: Peltigerales
- Family: Peltigeraceae
- Genus: Lobariella
- Species: L. pallidocrenulata

Binomial name
- Lobariella pallidocrenulata B.Moncada & Lücking (2013)

Species of lichen

Lobariella pallidocrenulata is a species of foliose lichen in the family Peltigeraceae. This leafy lichen forms loose patches up to 10 centimeters across on small trees and shrubs in high-elevation páramo environments, where it tolerates exposure to wind and sun. It can be distinguished from the similar and widespread L. pallida by its conspicuous large white spots along the lobe margins that elongate into prominent pores, giving the edges a distinctive mottled appearance.

== Systematics ==
Lobariella pallidocrenulata was described in 2013; its epithet refers to the species' pale tone and crenulate (scalloped) lobe margins. It differs from the widespread L. pallida in bearing discrete, conspicuous marginal maculae that expand into elongate pseudocyphellae, a feature absent or inconspicuous in the latter.

A three-locus maximum-likelihood analysis placed L. pallidocrenulata as the well-supported sister species of L. crenulata. In a broader internal transcribed spacer-only tree, L. pallidocrenulata clustered with L. botryoides, L. crenulata, L. pallida, L. parmelioides, and L. reticulata, suggesting these six morphologically diverse taxa form a late-diversifying complex within the genus.

== Description ==
The thallus of L. pallidocrenulata loosely envelops thin trunks, stems, and branches, spreading up to about 10 cm (4 in). Lobes are broad, 10–20 mm (0.4–0.8 in) wide and as much as 4 cm (1.6 in) long, with irregular or dichotomously forked margins. When moist, the upper surface is pale green; it dries to pale or yellowish gray. Large spots (maculae) at lobe tips become immersed or erumpent pseudocyphellae that elongate to roughly 1 mm and may coalesce into shallow ridges, giving the margin a mottled look. The lower surface is pale, furnished with a short tomentum and dense, discrete rhizines. Fruiting bodies (apothecia) are common, reaching up to 5 mm (0.2 in) in diameter; they have pale margins and concave orange-brown discs.

== Habitat and distribution ==
Lobariella pallidocrenulata is primarily associated with high-elevation páramo environments, occurring on small trees and shrubs exposed to wind and sun. It often co-occurs with L. pallida but can be separated by its larger marginal maculae and more prominent pseudocyphellae. Collections are known from Colombia and Costa Rica.
