= Xanthoparmelia bainskloofensis =

Scientific classification
- Domain: Eukaryota
- Kingdom: Fungi
- Division: Ascomycota
- Class: Lecanoromycetes
- Order: Lecanorales
- Family: Parmeliaceae
- Genus: Xanthoparmelia
- Species: X. bainskloofensis

Binomial name
- Xanthoparmelia bainskloofensis Elix & T.H.Nash (2002)

Species of lichen

Xanthoparmelia bainskloofensis is a species of saxicolous (rock-dwelling), foliose lichen in the family Parmeliaceae. It was formally described as a new species in 2002 by lichenologists John Elix and Thomas Hawkes Nash III. The type specimen was collected by Nash from Bainskloof Pass (Cape Province, South Africa) at an altitude of 600 m (2,000 ft), where it was found growing on acidic rock. The species epithet refers to the type locality, the only place the lichen is known to occur. It contains usnic acid as a major lichen product, and minor amounts of echinocarpic acid, conechinocarpic acid, and hypothamnolic acid.

== See also ==
- List of Xanthoparmelia species
