= Xanthoparmelia pustulifera =

Scientific classification
- Kingdom: Fungi
- Division: Ascomycota
- Class: Lecanoromycetes
- Order: Lecanorales
- Family: Parmeliaceae
- Genus: Xanthoparmelia
- Species: X. pustulifera

Binomial name
- Xanthoparmelia pustulifera Hale, T.H.Nash & Elix (1986)

Species of lichen

Xanthoparmelia pustulifera is a species of saxicolous (rock-dwelling), foliose lichen in the family Parmeliaceae. Found in Southern Africa, it was formally described as a new species in 1986 by the lichenologists Mason Hale, Thomas Nash, and John Elix. The type specimen was collected from Cape Province at an elevation of 1,000 m (3,300 ft), where it was found in karoo vegetation growing on open dolerite ridges. The thallus of the lichen is dull yellowish-green and reaches 5–8 cm (2.0–3.1 in) in diameter. It contains stictic acid, constictic acid, usnic acid, and trace amounts of norstictic acid. The species epithet alludes to the isidia, which erupt into "pustulate or coarsely subsorediate masses".

== See also ==
- List of Xanthoparmelia species
