= Lobariella parmelioides =

Scientific classification
- Kingdom: Fungi
- Division: Ascomycota
- Class: Lecanoromycetes
- Order: Peltigerales
- Family: Peltigeraceae
- Genus: Lobariella
- Species: L. parmelioides

Binomial name
- Lobariella parmelioides B.Moncada & Lücking (2013)

Species of lichen

Lobariella parmelioides is a species of foliose lichen in the family Peltigeraceae. This leafy lichen forms loose rosettes up to 8 centimeters across on shrubs and small trees in high-elevation páramo grasslands, where it tolerates the exposed, windswept conditions typical of these alpine environments. It gets its name from its distinctive truncated lobes that resemble those of the unrelated lichen genus Parmelia, and appears to have a restricted distribution in Colombia, being abundant at its type locality but absent from most other surveyed páramos.

== Taxonomy ==
Lobariella parmelioides was described in 2013; the epithet reflects its truncate, Parmelia-like lobes. It differs from L. crenulata in its regularly truncate lobes and in having fruiting bodies (apothecia) with fewer marginal lobules. Chemically the species produces gyrophoric acid (chemosyndrome A1b).

A three-locus maximum-likelihood tree recovered L. parmelioides as the strongly supported sister species of L. botryoides, cementing its position within the pallida–crenulata complex. In a broader ITS-only analysis, L. parmelioides clustered with L. botryoides, L. crenulata, L. pallida, L. pallidocrenulata, and L. reticulata, indicating these six morphologically disparate taxa form a late-diverging clade within the genus.

== Description ==
The thallus of L. parmelioides forms loose rosettes up to about 8 cm (3.1 in) across on thin trunks and stems. Lobes are 5–10 mm (0.2–0.4 in) wide and as much as 4 cm (1.6 in) long, dichotomously notched (incised) so that each branch ends in a truncate lobe reminiscent of Parmelia. When wet the upper surface is pale green; it dries to pale gray and often shows a dark-brown marginal line. Maculae are absent or restricted to lobe tips, where they quickly open into elongate pseudocyphellae up to 2 mm long. The lower surface is cream to pale brown, with a short tomentum and dense rhizines. Apothecia reach 5 mm (0.2 in) in diameter; their pale margins carry fewer lobules than those of L. crenulata, and the concave discs are orange-brown. Ascospores are narrowly ellipsoid, measuring 50–75 μm in length.

== Habitat and distribution ==
Lobariella parmelioides appears to be a páramo specialist, growing on shrubs and small trees in exposed, high-elevation grassland. It is abundant at its type locality but absent from most other surveyed páramos, suggesting a restricted range. The Parmelia-like lobes and relatively simple apothecia allow it to be distinguished from co-occurring species such as L. pallida, L. pallidocrenulata, and L. crenulata.
