= Lobariella sipmanii =

Conservation status
- Least Concern (IUCN 3.1)

Scientific classification
- Kingdom: Fungi
- Division: Ascomycota
- Class: Lecanoromycetes
- Order: Peltigerales
- Family: Peltigeraceae
- Genus: Lobariella
- Species: L. sipmanii

Binomial name
- Lobariella sipmanii B.Moncada, Betanc. & Lücking (2011)

Species of lichen

Lobariella sipmanii is a species of foliose lichen in the family Peltigeraceae. It is found in high-altitude páramo in Cundinamarca, Colombia.

== Taxonomy ==
Lobariella sipmanii was formally described as a new species in 2011 by Bibiana Moncada, Luisa Betancourt, and Robert Lücking. The species epithet sipmanii honours the authors' colleague Harrie Sipman, "for his invaluable contributions to lichenology in the Neotropics".

== Description ==
The upper surface of the thallus of Lobariella sipmanii is pale blue-grey and glaucous, while the lower surface is white to yellowish white with a whitish texture resembling a tomentum. It is loosely attached to its attachment point, and reaches a diameter of up to about 8 cm (3 in); the individual lobes comprising the thallus are up to 3 cm (1.2 in) wide. There are many apothecia, and they are cup-shaped with thick white margins, measuring up to 8 mm (0.3 in) in diameter. The ascospores are hyaline, spindle-shaped (fusiform) to long and needle-shaped (acicular) with between 5 and 9 septa, and have dimensions of 55–115 by 4–5 μm. Lobariella sipmanii contains gyrophoric acid as its major lichen product in addition to smaller amounts of metabolically related satellite compounds.

== Habitat and distribution ==
The type specimen was collected in páramo vegetation near Lake Chisacá (Sumapaz Páramo, Bogotá) at an elevation of 3,725 m (12,221 ft); here it was found growing in partial shade on the trunks and stems of small trees. The predominant plants in this area are Diplostephium revolutum, and species of both Espeletia and Pentacalia. Other associates are the congener L. pallida, and mosses. The lichen is known from a few collections at the type locality.
