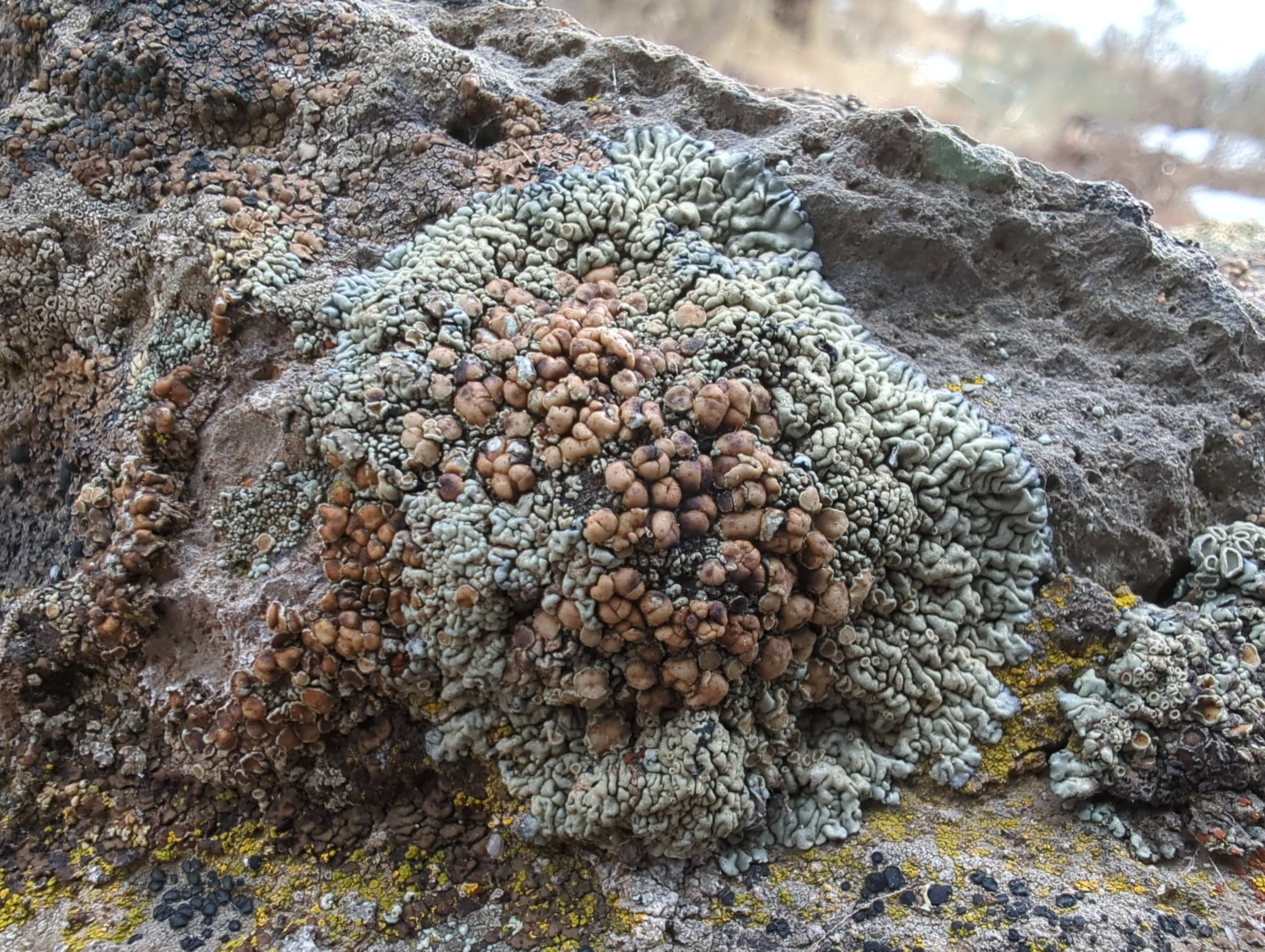
- in Tahoe National Forest, California

Scientific classification
- Domain: Eukaryota
- Kingdom: Fungi
- Division: Ascomycota
- Class: Lecanoromycetes
- Order: Lecanorales
- Family: Lecanoraceae
- Genus: Protoparmeliopsis
- Species: P. sierrae

Binomial name
- Protoparmeliopsis sierrae (B.D.Ryan & T.H.Nash) S.Y.Kondr. (2012)

Synonyms
- Lecanora sierrae B.D.Ryan & T.H.Nash (1993)

= Protoparmeliopsis sierrae =

Species of lichen

Protoparmeliopsis sierrae is a species of saxicolous (rock-dwelling), crustose lichen found in the western United States. It was first formally described in 1993 by US lichenologists Bruce Douglas Ryan and Thomas Hawkes Nash III. Sergey Kondratyuk transferred the taxon to the genus Protoparmeliopsis in 2012.
