= Buellia nashii =

Scientific classification
- Domain: Eukaryota
- Kingdom: Fungi
- Division: Ascomycota
- Class: Lecanoromycetes
- Order: Caliciales
- Family: Caliciaceae
- Genus: Buellia
- Species: B. nashii

Binomial name
- Buellia nashii Bungartz

Species of lichen

Buellia nashii is a species of lichen characterized by its crustose thallus, typically found in the Sonoran Desert Region and adjacent areas. It was first described by Bungartz et al. The species is named in honor of Dr. Thomas H. Nash III, a notable lichenologist and the Ph.D. supervisor of the author.

== Morphology ==
The thallus appears as a crust, dense in texture, showcasing a spectrum of hues ranging from ivory to deep brown or gray. Its surface varies from smooth to deeply fissured, sometimes adorned with fine or coarse pruina.

Apothecia are lecideine in nature, meaning they are sessile and predominantly black, often with thin to thick margins. As they mature, the disc typically darkens and becomes convex.

Ascospores are brown, with a single septum, and are shaped either oblong or ellipsoid.

Pycnidia are infrequent and take on an urceolate to globose form, housing bacilliform conidia within.

== Chemistry ==
Typically, Buellia nashii contains the depside atranorin and the depsidones norstictic and connorstictic acid. However, some specimens may lack norstictic acid and instead contain stictic and hypositictic acids. Spot tests usually result in K+ yellow to red, P+ yellow reactions, and negative reactions for C, KC, and CK. The thallus is not amyloid, but apothecia react amyloid in Lugol's solution.

== Ecology ==
Buellia nashii is commonly found on a variety of siliceous rock substrates, occasionally on sandstones with small amounts of carbonates. It thrives in arid environments, particularly in the Sonoran Desert Region.

== Distribution ==
The species has a wide distribution throughout the Sonoran Desert Region and adjacent areas, such as Arizona, southern California, Baja California, Baja California Sur, and Chihuahua.

== Identification ==
Buellia nashii closely resembles B. dispersa but can be distinguished by its chemistry and exciple pigmentation. While both species have similar thalli, B. nashii contains norstictic acid and exhibits a characteristic aeruginose pigment in the outer exciple cells.
