= Acarospora nashii =

Scientific classification
- Kingdom: Fungi
- Division: Ascomycota
- Class: Lecanoromycetes
- Order: Acarosporales
- Family: Acarosporaceae
- Genus: Acarospora
- Species: A. nashii

Binomial name
- Acarospora nashii K.Knudsen (2011)
- Type locality: Johnson County, Wyoming, U.S.

Species of lichen

Acarospora nashii is a species of lichenicolous (lichen-dwelling) lichen in the family Acarosporaceae. It was described by Kerry Knudsen in 2011 after the long-misplaced type material of Acarospora succedens was rediscovered and shown to represent a different, widely distributed taxon. Collections made by Thomas Hawkes Nash III that had been treated as A. succedens were therefore recognized as a separate species and named A. nashii.

It is lichenized but begins with a juvenile parasitic phase on other lichens, developing out of the host thallus and then forming its own areolate crust (a thallus broken into small, angular patches) that may stay scattered among the host's areoles or form small patches up to about 2 cm (0.79 in) across. The areoles are typically 0.5–0.8 mm wide and less than 0.4 mm thick, dark brown to mahogany, and range from smooth to deeply fissured or warty. The fruiting bodies (apothecia) are often absent, but when present there are usually one or two per areole with a black, rough disk. Microscopically, its asci contain about 50–60 spores, and the ascospores are mostly spherical, 3–6 μm wide, each with a distinct perispore. Standard spot tests are negative and no secondary metabolites were detected.

Acarospora nashii occurs on silicate or volcanic rock in western North America, where it parasitizes the lichens Dimelaena oreina and Pleopsidium flavum and has been documented from Colorado, Nevada, and Wyoming The species epithet honors Thomas H. Nash III for his contributions to lichenology.
