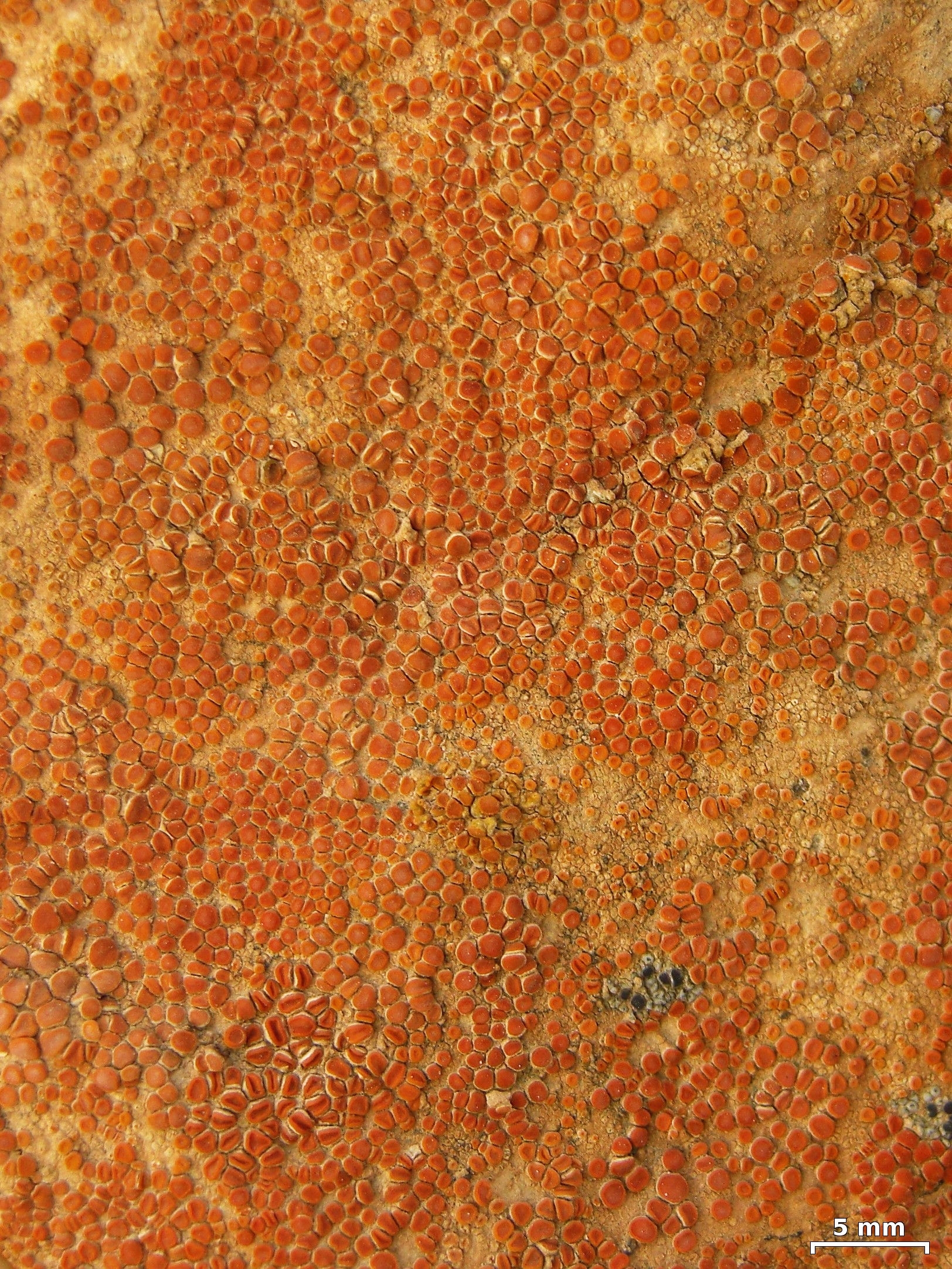
- Tomnashia luteominia, Palos Verdes, Southern California

Scientific classification
- Domain: Eukaryota
- Kingdom: Fungi
- Division: Ascomycota
- Class: Lecanoromycetes
- Order: Teloschistales
- Family: Teloschistaceae
- Genus: Tomnashia
- Species: T. luteominia

Binomial name
- Tomnashia luteominia (Tuck.) S.Y.Kondr. & Hur (2017)

Synonyms
- List: Blastenia ferruginea subsp. bolanderi (Tuck.) Hasse (1913); Blastenia ferruginea var. bolanderi (Tuck.) Hasse (1913); Blastenia luteominia (Tuck.) Hasse (1913); Caloplaca bolanderi (Tuck.) H.Magn. (1944); Caloplaca ferruginea f. bolanderi (Tuck.) Zahlbr. (1930); Caloplaca ferruginea var. bolanderi (Tuck.) Zahlbr. (1930); Caloplaca luteominia (Tuck.) Zahlbr. (1930); Caloplaca luteominia var. bolanderi (Tuck.) Arup (1993); Lecidea luteominia (Tuck.) Hue (1914); Placodium ferrugineum f. bolanderi Tuck. (1882); Placodium ferrugineum var. bolanderi (Tuck.) T.A.Williams (1893); Placodium luteominium Tuck. [as 'luteo-minium'] (1866); Polycauliona luteominia (Tuck.) Arup, Frödén & Søchting (2013); Polycauliona luteominia var. bolanderi (Tuck.) Arup, Frödén & Søchting (2013); Pyrenodesmia bolanderi (Tuck.) E.D.Rudolph (1955); Pyrenodesmia luteominia (Tuck.) E.D.Rudolph (1955)

= Tomnashia luteominia =

Species of lichen

Tomnashia luteominia, the red firedot lichen, is a species of saxicolous (rock-dwelling), crustose lichen in the family Teloschistaceae. It is widely distributed along the North American west coast. The lichen has two varieties: var. bolanderi has distinctive red apothecia (fruiting bodies), while var. luteominia has orange-brown apothecia.

== Taxonomy ==
The lichen was first formally described as a new species in 1866 by the American lichenologist Edward Tuckerman, as Placodium luteominimum. Sergey Kondratyuk and Jae-Seoun Hur transferred it to the genus Tomnashia in 2017. It is commonly known as the "red firedot lichen".
