= Lobariella angustata =

Conservation status
- Vulnerable (IUCN 3.1)

Scientific classification
- Kingdom: Fungi
- Division: Ascomycota
- Class: Lecanoromycetes
- Order: Peltigerales
- Family: Peltigeraceae
- Genus: Lobariella
- Species: L. angustata

Binomial name
- Lobariella angustata B.Moncada & Lücking (2013)

Species of lichen

Lobariella angustata is a species of foliose lichen in the family Peltigeraceae. This lichen forms loose, draping patches on tree branches in Colombian rainforests, with narrow, linear lobes that are typically 3–5 millimeters wide. It can be distinguished from similar species by its slender lobes and its unique chemical signature. The species appears to be uncommon and is currently known only from submontane to lower montane rainforests in Colombia at elevations of 600–800 meters.

== Taxonomy ==
Lobariella angustata was described in 2013 by the lichenologists Bibiana Moncada and Robert Lücking as part of a revision of the family Lobariaceae (now equivalent to Peltigeraceae subfamily Lobarioideae). Its species epithet, angustata, alludes to its narrow lobes. It is most easily distinguished from the related L. crenulata by its slender lobes (around 3–5 mm wide) and by its chemistry: while L. crenulata produces the common lichen substance gyrophoric acid, L. angustata contains an unidentified compound (referred to as "Lobariella unidentified 3") that gives a positive emerald‑green reaction with potassium hydroxide solution.

An expanded single-locus ITS tree recovered L. angustata inside the strongly supported L. pseudocrenulata – L. rugulosa clade, together with L. auriculata, indicating a closer relationship to those taxa than to the pallidocrenulata–crenulata complex. While the pallidocrenulata–crenulata–reticulata lineages formed a separate cluster, L. angustata remained in the pseudocrenulata group.

== Description ==
The thallus (body) of L. angustata loosely drapes over stems and branches and can reach about 5 cm across. Its lobes are linear and relatively narrow, typically 3–5 mm wide and up to about 3 cm long, with rounded or irregular tips. When wet the upper surface is grey‑green, turning pale grey as it dries. Near the lobe edges the cortex develops small pale patches (maculae) that break to form pseudocyphellae—tiny pores through which the lichen exchanges gases. Unlike some relatives, L. angustata lacks isidia or phyllidia (small reproductive outgrowths). The lower surface is cream‑coloured with a felt of pale hairs (tomentum) and discrete grey‑brown rhizines, root‑like structures that anchor the lichen to its substrate.

== Habitat and distribution ==
This species has so far been recorded from submontane to lower montane rainforest in Colombia at elevations of around 600–800 m (2,000–2,600 ft). It grows on semi‑shaded branches and appears to be uncommon.
