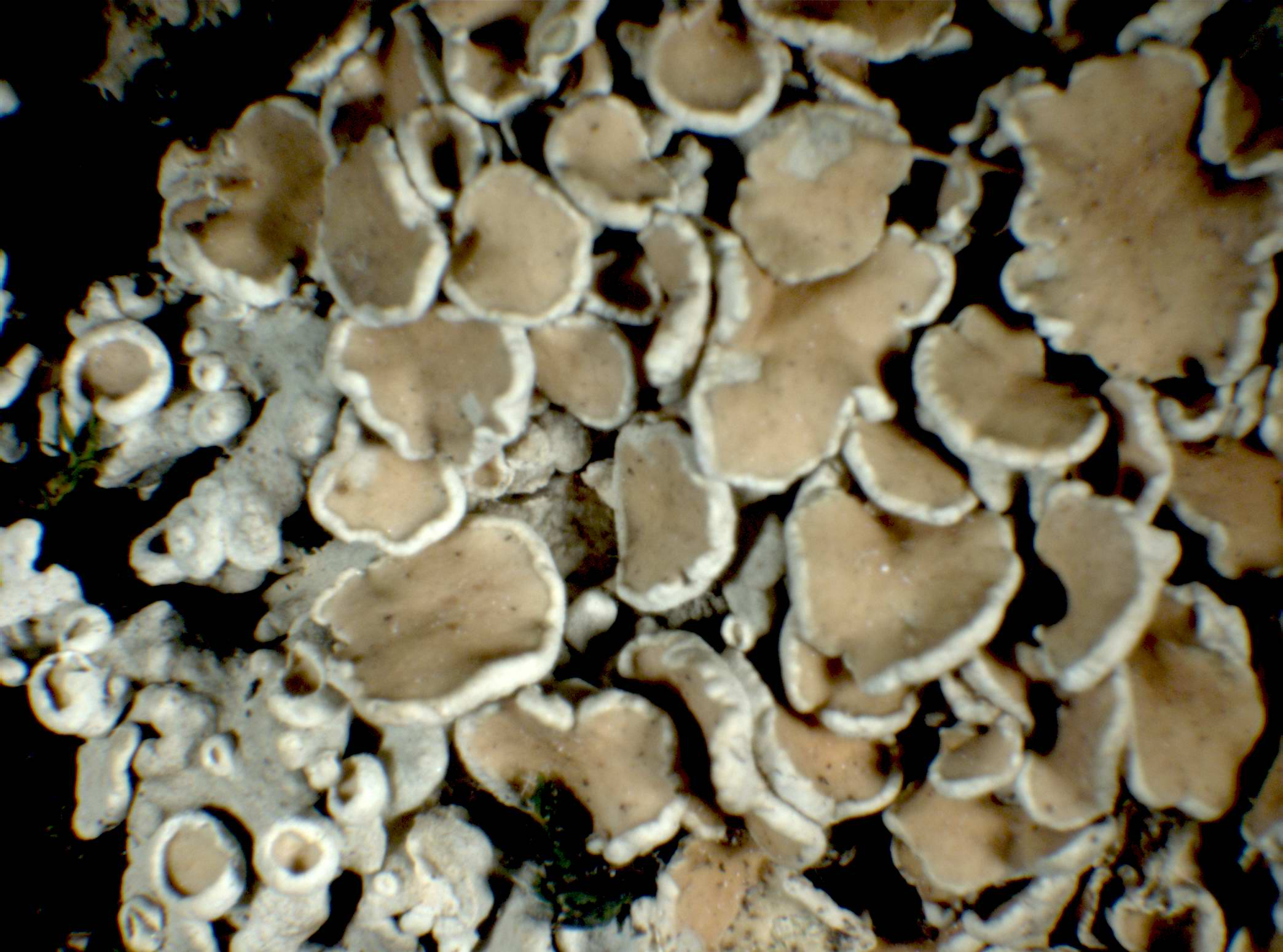

Scientific classification
- Kingdom: Fungi
- Division: Ascomycota
- Class: Lecanoromycetes
- Order: Lecanorales
- Family: Lecanoraceae
- Genus: Protoparmeliopsis
- Species: P. achariana

Binomial name
- Protoparmeliopsis achariana (A.L.Sm.) Moberg & R.Sant. (2004)

Synonyms
- Lecanora achariana A.L.Sm. (1918); Placolecanora achariana (A.L.Sm.) Kopach. (1971); Placolecanora achariana (A.L.Sm.) Kopach. (1972)

= Protoparmeliopsis achariana =

Species of lichen

Protoparmeliopsis achariana is a species of saxicolous (rock-dwelling) crustose lichen in the family Lecanoraceae. It grows on siliceous rocks in the United Kingdom, where it is rare.

== Taxonomy ==
It was originally described by the British lichenologist Annie Lorrain Smith in 1918, as Lecanora achariana. Her original collections were made from rocks in maritime and upland localities in Wales, Cumbria, and northern Scotland. Smith noted it as a rare British lichen, distinguishing it from L. cartilaginea (now Protoparmeliopsis cartilaginea) primarily by the form of the squamules and its distinctive colouration. Historical collections documented in the literature include specimens from Barmouth in Merioneth (Wales), and Yorkshire specimens. Smith recognized the species as having a primarily northern distribution pattern in Britain. Roland Moberg and Rolf Santesson reclassified it in the genus Protoparmeliopsis in 2004.

== Description ==
Protoparmeliopsis achariana is characterised by its distinctive placodioid thallus (the main body of the lichen), which grows in rosette or cushion-like formations. The thallus displays a pale yellow to yellow-green or grey-white colouration. In the central region o the thallus, the lobes often grow slightly upward, overlapping each other and maintaining a loose attachment to the substrate. The marginal lobes measure between 0.8 and 1.5 mm in width (occasionally reaching up to 2 mm), and are white on their underside. These marginal sections lack a distinct border (non-marginate) and appear flat to slightly convex in shape.

The species typically produces abundant apothecia (disc-shaped fruiting bodies), measuring 1 to 2 mm in diameter. These reproductive structures are sessile (attached directly to the thallus) or have short stalks. The thalline margin (the rim of tissue surrounding the apothecium) develops a crenulate (finely scalloped) and wavy appearance over time. The central disc of the apothecium ranges in colour from pale grey-brown to pinkish brown, and may appear greenish when growing in shaded conditions. The disc surface lacks pruina (a powdery or frosted coating).

Microscopic examination reveals ascospores (spores produced in specialized cells called asci) measuring 10 to 15 micrometres (μm) in length (occasionally reaching 16 μm) and 4 to 6 μm in width.

Chemical spot tests commonly used to identify lichens show that the medulla (inner layer) of P. achariana is C−, Pd−, and typically K−, though rarely it may turn yellow then red (K+ yellow→red). The thallus does not fluoresce under ultraviolet light (UV−). Chemical analysis indicates the presence of zeorin, usnic acid, and unidentified triterpenoids.
