= Lobariella olivascens =

Conservation status
- Least Concern (IUCN 3.1)

Scientific classification
- Kingdom: Fungi
- Division: Ascomycota
- Class: Lecanoromycetes
- Order: Peltigerales
- Family: Peltigeraceae
- Genus: Lobariella
- Species: L. olivascens

Binomial name
- Lobariella olivascens B.Moncada & Lücking (2013)

Species of lichen

Lobariella olivascens is a species of foliose lichen in the family Peltigeraceae. Found in Colombia, this leafy lichen forms tightly attached patches up to 12 centimeters across on tree trunks and branches in upper montane rainforests, with a distinctive olive-brown coloration when dried that gives the species its name. It can be identified by the large white spots on its surface that break open to form elongated pores, creating a mottled appearance that distinguishes it from similar species.

== Taxonomy ==
Lobariella olivascens was described in 2013; the epithet refers to the thallus's diagnostic olive-brown coloration when dried. Although initially compared with L. crenulata, it differs in its olive tonality and the presence of large white maculae that expand into conspicuous pseudocyphellae. Chemically the species belongs to chemosyndrome B ("Lobariella unidentified 3") rather than producing gyrophoric acid.

== Description ==
The tightly attached thallus can reach about 12 cm (4.7 in) across on trunks and larger stems. Lobes are 7–15 mm (0.28–0.59 in) (occasionally to 20 mm) wide and up to 5 cm (2.0 in) long. In the field the upper surface is dark gray when dry but turns olive-green to olive-brown in herbarium specimens. Large, white spots (maculae at lobe tips quickly break open and elongate to form pseudocyphellae up to 2 mm long, giving the lichen a mottled appearance. Isidia are absent.

The lower surface is cream to yellow-brown, darkening with age, and bears a short yellowish tomentum together with discrete dark rhizines that anchor the thallus. Fruiting bodies (apothecia), when present, are relatively large—up to 5 mm (0.2 in) in diameter—with cream to yellow-brown lobulate margins surrounding a dark reddish disc.

== Habitat and distribution ==
Lobariella olivascens has been recorded from upper montane rainforests of Colombia, where it grows on branches and twigs in semi-exposed situations. Its dark olive tinge and prominent maculae separate it from the otherwise similar L. crenulata.
