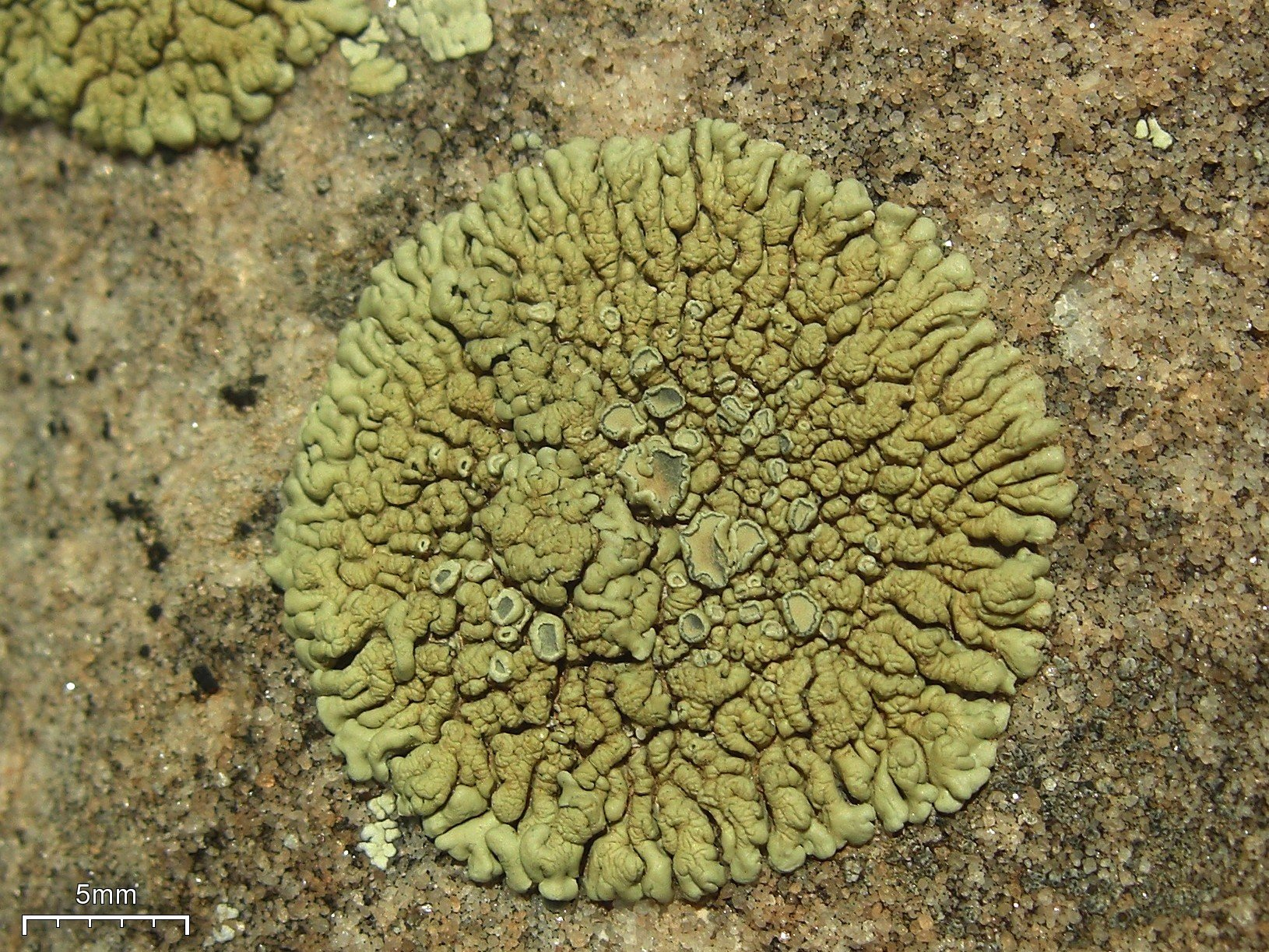

Conservation status
- Apparently Secure (NatureServe)

Scientific classification
- Kingdom: Fungi
- Division: Ascomycota
- Class: Lecanoromycetes
- Order: Lecanorales
- Family: Lecanoraceae
- Genus: Protoparmeliopsis
- Species: P. garovaglii

Binomial name
- Protoparmeliopsis garovaglii (Körb.) Arup, Zhao Xin & Lumbsch (2015)

Synonyms
- Placodium garovaglii Körb. (1859); Placolecanora garovaglii (Körb.) Räsänen (1972); Squamaria garovaglii (Körb.) Anzi (1860); Lecanora garovaglii (Körb.) Zahlbr. (1900)

= Protoparmeliopsis garovaglii =

Species of lichen-forming fungus

Protoparmeliopsis garovaglii is a species of saxicolous (rock-dwelling), crustose lichen in the family Lecanoraceae. The species was originally described as Placodium garovaglii by German lichenologist Gustav Wilhelm Körber in 1859. It was later classified in Lecanora in 1900, and known as a member of that genus for more than a century. Molecular phylogenetics showed that Lecanora was highly polyphyletic, and as a result, the genus was divided into several smaller, more phylogenetically natural genera. Subsequently, in 2015, Lecanora garovaglii was transferred to genus Protoparmeliopsis.
