= Lobariella papillifera =

Scientific classification
- Kingdom: Fungi
- Division: Ascomycota
- Class: Lecanoromycetes
- Order: Peltigerales
- Family: Peltigeraceae
- Genus: Lobariella
- Species: L. papillifera

Binomial name
- Lobariella papillifera B.Moncada & Lücking (2013)

Species of lichen

Lobariella papillifera is a rare species of foliose lichen in the family Peltigeraceae. This leafy lichen forms tightly attached patches up to 10 centimeters across on tree trunks in Colombian montane rainforests. It is distinguished by its distinctive flattened reproductive structures that have a minutely bumpy, velvety texture when viewed under magnification.

== Taxonomy ==
Lobariella papillifera was described in 2013 by Bibiana Moncada and Robert Lücking from specimens collected in Colombia. Its specific epithet, papillifera, refers to the minutely bumpy (papillose) surface of the species' flattened isidia. It can be separated from the superficially similar L. subexornata by those papillose, plate-like isidia and by its chemistry: the species falls within chemosyndrome B, containing an unidentified secondary metabolite rather than gyrophoric acid.

== Description ==
The thallus of L. papillifera is tightly attached to trunks and larger stems, forming patches up to about 10 cm (4 in) across. Lobes are 5–10 mm (0.2–0.4 in) wide and as much as 5 cm (2 in) long, with incised margins reminiscent of some Parmelia species. When wet the upper surface is bright green; upon drying it becomes pale gray. Irregular white lines develop into elongate pseudocyphellae that can reach 1 mm in length and provide gas exchange pores.

From those pseudocyphellae arise abundant, flattened isidia that are the same color as the thallus and extremely short—less than 0.03 mm high. Under magnification their cortices appear densely papillose, giving each isidium a finely pubescent texture. The lower surface is pale yellow-brown, bears a short yellowish tomentum, and carries scattered discrete rhizines.

== Habitat and distribution ==
As of its original publication, L. papillifera was known only from its type locality, a lower- to mid-montane rainforest in Colombia. The combination of papillose, flattened isidia and the absence of cylindrical propagules makes this lichen readily identifiable despite its apparent rarity.
