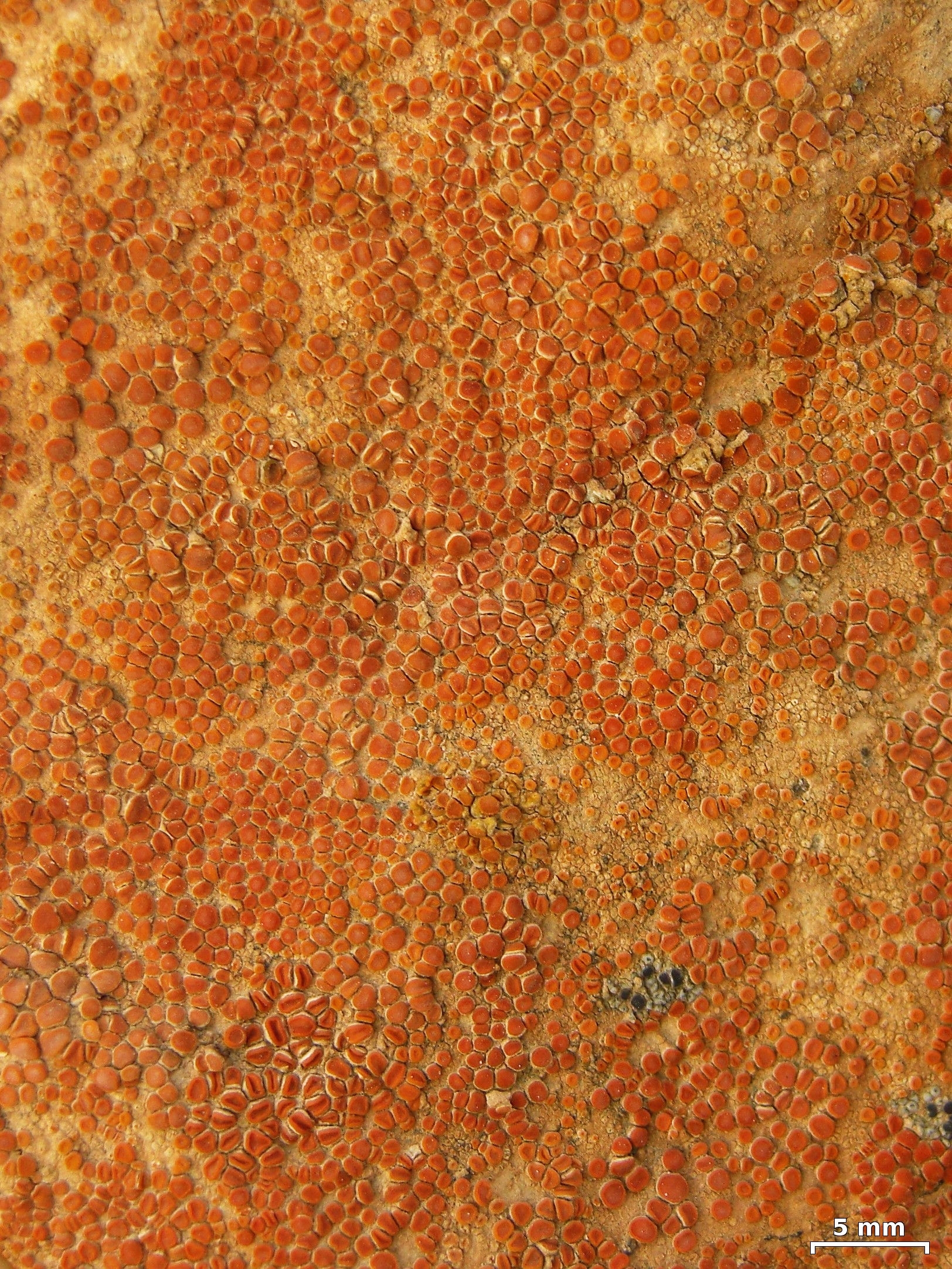
- Tomnashia luteominia, Palos Verdes, southern California

Scientific classification
- Domain: Eukaryota
- Kingdom: Fungi
- Division: Ascomycota
- Class: Lecanoromycetes
- Order: Teloschistales
- Family: Teloschistaceae
- Genus: Tomnashia; S.Y.Kondr. & Hur (2017)

Type species
- Tomnashia rosei (Hasse) S.Y.Kondr. & (Hur 2017)

Species
- T. ludificans T. luteominia T. nashii T. rosei

= Tomnashia =

Genus of lichens

Tomnashia is a genus of lichen-forming fungi in the family Teloschistaceae. It has four species of saxicolous (rock-dwelling), crustose lichens that occur in southwestern North America.

== Taxonomy ==
Tomnashia was circumscribed in 2017 by lichenologists Sergey Kondratyuk and Jae-Seoun Hur, who bestowed upon the taxon an eponym in honour of Thomas Hawkes Nash III, a significant contributor to lichenology, especially concerning North American lichen flora. The type species of this genus is Tomnashia rosei, which was originally described as Caloplaca rosei by Hermann Edward Hasse in 1911. Through combined phylogenetic analysis, it was determined that Tomnashia resides in the outermost position among monophyletic groups of the Polycauliona subclade of the subfamily Xanthorioideae. This genus differs notably from other members of Polycauliona with its distinct characteristics and morphology.

== Description ==
Presenting a varied range of colours, the crustose thallus of Tomnashia ranges from white, grey, and greenish-yellow to yellowish orange, or apricot orange, with some species having a unique waxy translucent appearance. The small, biatorine apothecia are usually orange to reddish-brown. Another unique attribute of this genus is its ascospores, which are polarilocular and hyaline. Its distinctive chemical composition includes substances such as parietin, fallacinal, emodin, teloschistin, and parietinic acid.

== Habitat and distribution ==
Predominantly distributed in the southwestern part of North America, Tomnashia is found mainly on calcareous rock and soil, but it can also grow on non-calcareous rocks. Some related genera, such as Polycauliona and Igneoplaca, share a similar, relatively limited distribution in coastal southwestern North America. Other genera in the same subfamily, such as Massjukiella and Verrucoplaca, have a much broader distribution in the Northern Hemisphere or worldwide.

== Species ==
- Tomnashia ludificans (Arup) S.Y.Kondr. & Hur(2017)
- Tomnashia luteominia (Tuck.) S.Y.Kondr. & Hur (2017)
- Tomnashia nashii (Nav.-Ros., Gaya & Hladun) S.Y.Kondr. & Hur (2017)
- Tomnashia rosei (Hasse) S.Y.Kondr. & Hur (2017)
