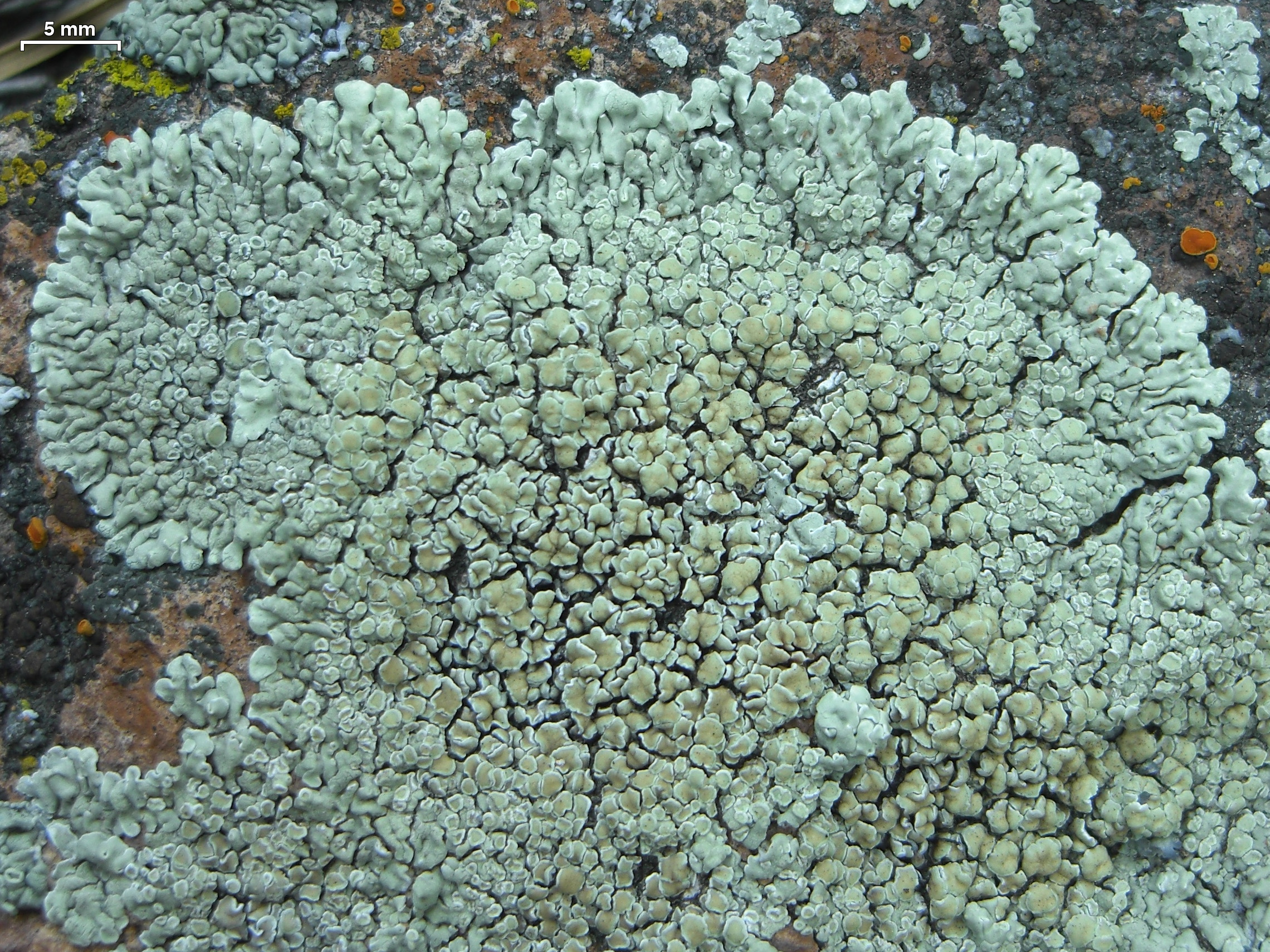
- Protoparmeliopsis muralis

Scientific classification
- Domain: Eukaryota
- Kingdom: Fungi
- Division: Ascomycota
- Class: Lecanoromycetes
- Order: Lecanorales
- Family: Lecanoraceae
- Genus: Protoparmeliopsis; M.Choisy (1929)

Type species
- Protoparmeliopsis muralis (Schreb.) M.Choisy (1929)

= Protoparmeliopsis =

Genus of lichen

Protoparmeliopsis is a genus of saxicolous (rock-dwelling, crustose lichens in the family Lecanoraceae. It has about 20 species. The genus was circumscribed by French botanist Maurice Choisy in 1929.

== Species ==
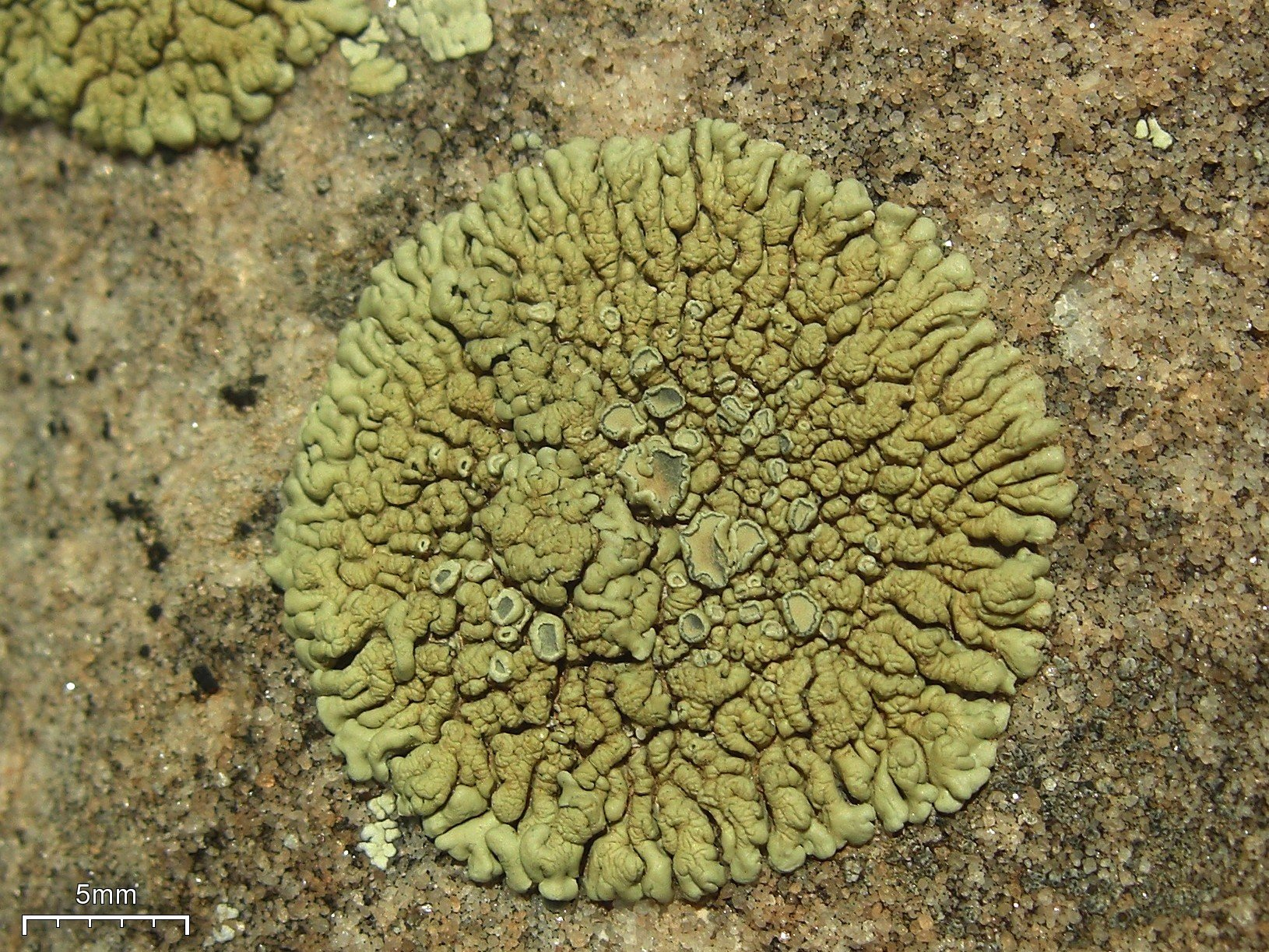
Protoparmeliopsis garovaglii

- Protoparmeliopsis achariana (A.L.Sm.) Moberg & R.Sant. (2004)
- Protoparmeliopsis admontensis (Zahlbr.) Hafellner (2005)
- Protoparmeliopsis baranowii (Poelt) S.Y.Kondr. (2012)
- Protoparmeliopsis bipruinosa (Fink) S.Y.Kondr. (2012)
- Protoparmeliopsis bogdoensis (Tomin) S.Y.Kondr. (2012)
- Protoparmeliopsis bolcana (Pollini) Lumbsch (2016)
- Protoparmeliopsis chejuensis S.Y.Kondr. & Hur (2013)
- Protoparmeliopsis chlorophthalma (Poelt & Tomin) S.Y.Kondr. (2012)
- Protoparmeliopsis degelii (T.Schauer & Brodo) S.Y.Kondr. (2012)
- Protoparmeliopsis dispersoareolata (Schaer.) S.Y.Kondr. (2012)
- Protoparmeliopsis ertzii Bungartz & Elix (2020)
- Protoparmeliopsis esfahanensis S.Y.Kondr. & Zarei-Darki (2012)
- Protoparmeliopsis garovaglii (Körb.) Arup, Zhao Xin & Lumbsch (2015)
- Protoparmeliopsis geiserae (B.D.Ryan) S.Y.Kondr. (2012)
- Protoparmeliopsis graeca (J.Steiner) Sipman & Cl.Roux (2016)
- Protoparmeliopsis gyrophorica (Lendemer) S.Y.Kondr. (2013)
- Protoparmeliopsis hieroglyphica (Poelt) S.Y.Kondr. (2012)
- Protoparmeliopsis klauskalbii (Sipman) Şenkard. (2011)
- Protoparmeliopsis kofae (B.D.Ryan & T.H.Nash) S.Y.Kondr. (2012)
- Protoparmeliopsis kopachevskae S.Y.Kondr., Lőkös & Hur (2017)
- Protoparmeliopsis kotovii (Oxner) S.Y.Kondr. (2012)
- Protoparmeliopsis kukunorensis (H.Magn.) S.Y.Kondr. (2012)
- Protoparmeliopsis laatokkensis (Räsänen) Moberg & R.Sant. (2004)
- Protoparmeliopsis macrocyclos (H.Magn.) Moberg & R.Sant. (2004)
- Protoparmeliopsis mazatzalensis (B.D.Ryan & T.H.Nash) S.Y.Kondr. (2013)
- Protoparmeliopsis muralis (Schreb.) M.Choisy (1929)
- Protoparmeliopsis nashii (B.D.Ryan) S.Y.Kondr. (2012)
- Protoparmeliopsis orbicularis (Schaer.) S.Y.Kondr. (2012)
- Protoparmeliopsis peltata (Ramond) Arup, Zhao Xin & Lumbsch (2015)
- Protoparmeliopsis pinguis (Tuck.) S.Y.Kondr. (2013)
- Protoparmeliopsis sierrae (B.D.Ryan & T.H.Nash) S.Y.Kondr. (2012)
- Protoparmeliopsis sphaeroidea (Oxner) S.Y.Kondr. (2012)
- Protoparmeliopsis straminea (Wahlenb.) S.Y.Kondr. (2012)
- Protoparmeliopsis taranii S.Y.Kondr. & Tchaban. (2013)
- Protoparmeliopsis usbekica (Poelt) S.Y.Kondr. (2012)
- Protoparmeliopsis vaenskaei (Cl.Roux & C.Coste) Cl.Roux (2016)
- Protoparmeliopsis verruculifera (Tomin) S.Y.Kondr. (2012)
- Protoparmeliopsis zareii S.Y.Kondr. (2012)
- Protoparmeliopsis zerovii S.Y.Kondr. (2016)
