= Niebla nashii =

Scientific classification
- Kingdom: Fungi
- Division: Ascomycota
- Class: Lecanoromycetes
- Order: Lecanorales
- Family: Ramalinaceae
- Genus: Niebla
- Species: N. nashii

Binomial name
- Niebla nashii Sipman (2011)

Species of lichen-forming fungus

Niebla nashii is a species of fruticose lichen in the family Ramalinaceae. Found in coastal Chile, it was formally described as a new species in 2011 by the Dutch lichenologist Harrie Sipman. The type specimen was collected in Coquimbo, where it was found growing on twigs, and occasionally on rock. The species epithet honors the American lichenologist Thomas Hawkes Nash III, the subject of the Festschrift (special commemorative volume) in which this article was published.
