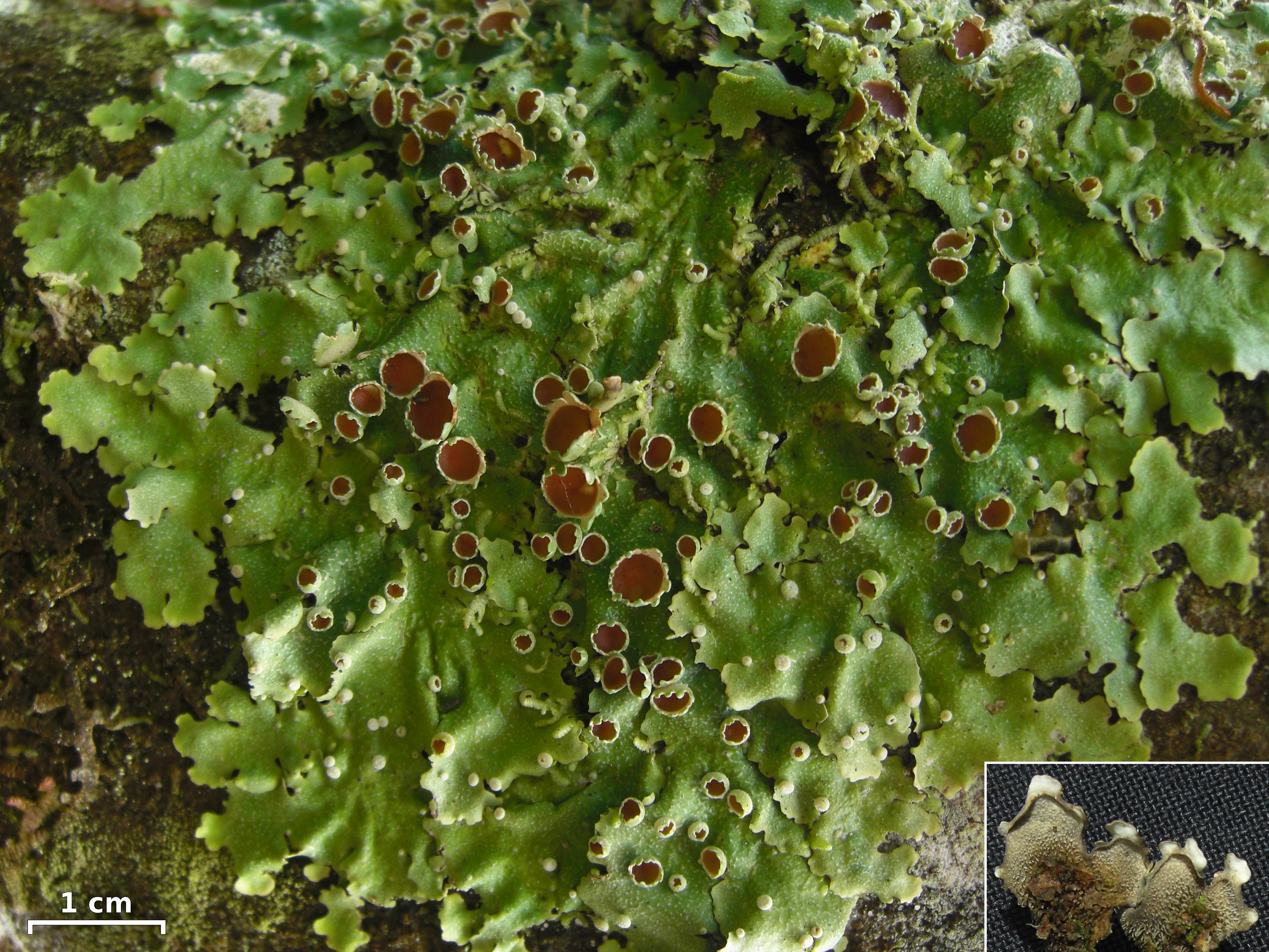
- Lobariella pseudocrenulata

Scientific classification
- Kingdom: Fungi
- Division: Ascomycota
- Class: Lecanoromycetes
- Order: Peltigerales
- Family: Peltigeraceae
- Genus: Lobariella; Yoshim. (2002)

Type species
- Lobariella crenulata (Hook.) Yoshim. 2002

Synonyms
- Durietzia (C.W.Dodge) Yoshim. (1998); Lobaria subgen. Durietzia C.W.Dodge (1964)

= Lobariella =

Genus of lichen-forming fungi

Lobariella is a genus of lichens belonging to the family Peltigeraceae.

The species of this genus are found in America.

== Taxonomy ==
Lobariella is a genus of foliose lichens, formerly classified in the Lobariaceae. Within Lobariaceae, species were long arranged in three large genera (Lobaria, Pseudocyphellaria, and Sticta), largely using whether cyphellae or pseudocyphellae are present on the lower surface. Lobariella was proposed as a segregate for species that instead develop pale spots (maculae) and/or small pores on the upper surface, together with a lower, felt-like tomentum made of hyphae with rounded cells. The group was first separated from Lobaria under the name Durietzia, but that name was illegitimate as a later homonym and was replaced by Lobariella; the type species is Lobariella crenulata.

A three-gene phylogenetic study found that Lobariaceae contains multiple well-supported evolutionary lineages and argued that these lineages are better treated as separate genera than forced into the traditional three-genus scheme. In that framework, Lobariella forms a distinct lineage within the broader Lobaria group, close to the Lobaria peltigera group (treated there as the genus Yoshimuriella) and the Sticta wrightii group (treated there as the genus Dendriscosticta). With expanded sampling, the same work greatly enlarged the circumscription of Lobariella, recognizing 26 species in the genus and describing 19 of them as new.

Lobariella is recognized by the development of distinct maculae and/or pseudocyphellae on the upper surface (the surface may otherwise be smooth when young and become more uneven with age), and by a usually pale, even lower tomentum that is not arranged into vein-like patterns. The genus is centred in the Neotropics (from Mexico to southern Brazil), although some records extend beyond that region (for example, reports of L. crenulata from Hawaii). At the species level, the study found that combinations of external form, the identity of the photosynthetic partner, and secondary chemistry tend to track major evolutionary lineages, helping to separate species that had previously been treated under a small number of broad names.

== Species ==
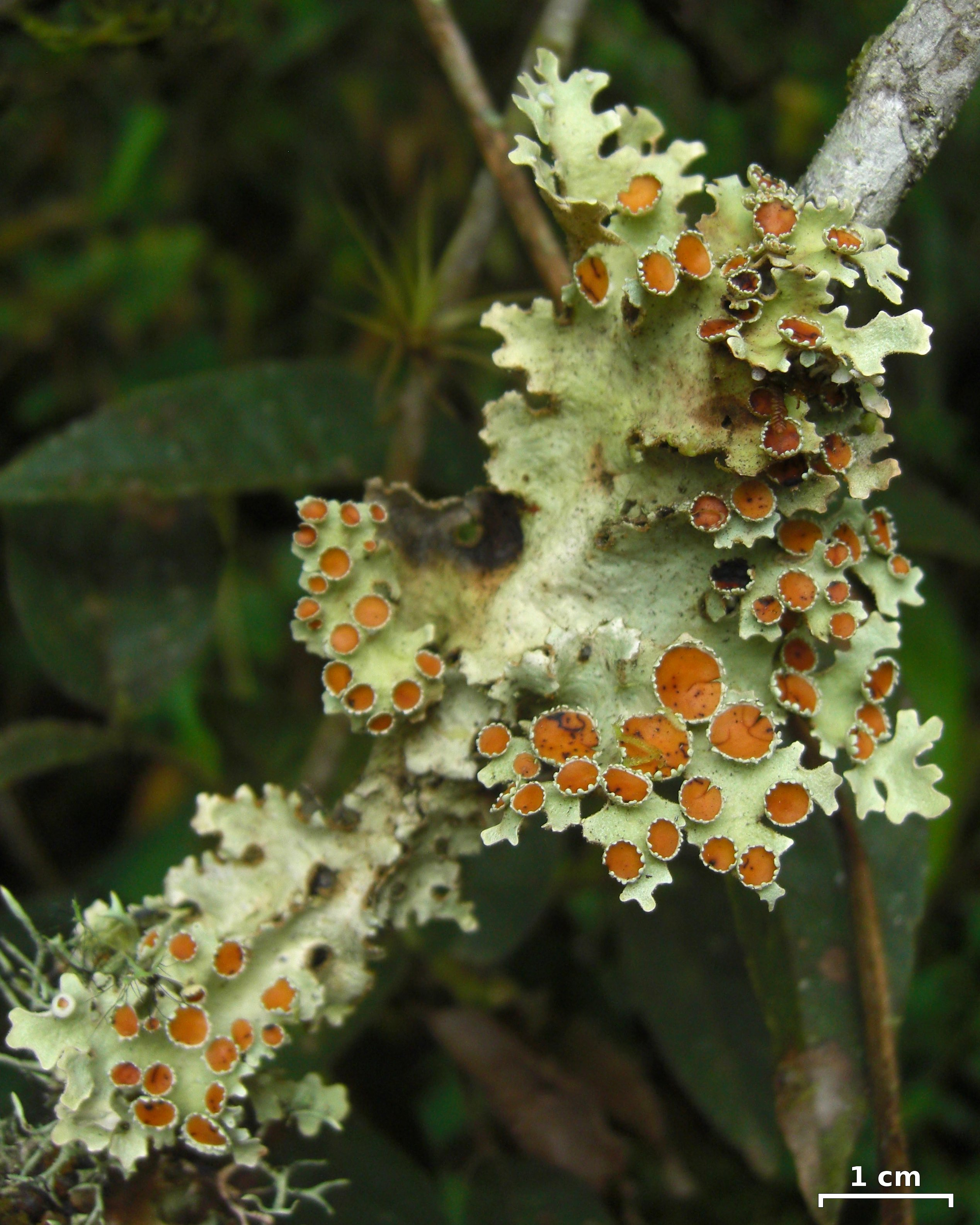
Lobariella pallida in Machu Picchu, Peru

- Lobariella angustata B.Moncada & Lücking (2013)
- Lobariella auriculata B.Moncada & Lücking (2013)
- Lobariella botryoides (Yoshim. & Arv.) B.Moncada & Lücking (2011)
- Lobariella corallophora (Yoshim.) B.Moncada & Lücking (2013)
- Lobariella crenulata (Hook.) Yoshim. (2002)
- Lobariella ecorticata B.Moncada & Lücking (2013)
- Lobariella exornata (Zahlbr.) Yoshim. (2002)
- Lobariella flavomedullosa B.Moncada, Betanc. & Lücking (2013)
- Lobariella flynniana Lücking, B.Moncada & C.W.Sm. (2017) – Hawaii
- Lobariella foreroana B.Moncada & Lücking (2023)
- Lobariella isidiata B.Moncada & Lücking (2013)
- Lobariella nashii B.Moncada & Lücking (2013)
- Lobariella olivascens B.Moncada & Lücking (2013)
- Lobariella pallida (Hook.) B.Moncada & Lücking (2011)
- Lobariella pallidocrenulata B.Moncada & Lücking (2013)
- Lobariella papillifera B.Moncada & Lücking (2013)
- Lobariella parmelioides B.Moncada & Lücking (2013)
- Lobariella peltata B.Moncada & Lücking (2013)
- Lobariella pseudocrenulata B.Moncada & Lücking (2013)
- Lobariella reticulata B.Moncada & Lücking (2013)
- Lobariella robusta Lücking, B.Moncada & C.W.Sm. (2017) – Hawaii
- Lobariella rugulosa B.Moncada & Lücking (2013)
- Lobariella sandwicensis Lücking, B.Moncada & C.W.Sm. (2017) – Hawaii
- Lobariella sipmanii B.Moncada, Betanc. & Lücking (2011) – Colombia
- Lobariella soredians B.Moncada, Betanc. & Lücking (2013)
- Lobariella spathulifera B.Moncada & Lücking (2013)
- Lobariella stenroosiae B.Moncada & Lücking (2013)
- Lobariella subcorallophora B.Moncada & Lücking (2013)
- Lobariella subcrenulata B.Moncada & Lücking (2013)
- Lobariella subexornata (Yoshim.) Yoshim. (2002)
