= Caloplaca nashii =

Scientific classification
- Kingdom: Fungi
- Division: Ascomycota
- Class: Lecanoromycetes
- Order: Teloschistales
- Family: Teloschistaceae
- Genus: Caloplaca
- Species: C. nashii

Binomial name
- Caloplaca nashii Nav.-Ros., Gaya & Hladún

Species of fungus

Caloplaca nashii is an orange crustose lichen found on calcareous rocks in northern Mexico, southern California, and Baja California. It is the most common of many members of the genus Caloplaca found on rocks in Joshua Tree National Park. It may sometimes be slightly endolithic (growing inside solid rock). It does not have elongated lobes like some other crustose lichens. It has no prothallus. It is in the Caloplaca fungus genus of the Teloschistaceae family.

== See also ==
- List of Caloplaca species
