= Lobariella auriculata =

Scientific classification
- Kingdom: Fungi
- Division: Ascomycota
- Class: Lecanoromycetes
- Order: Peltigerales
- Family: Peltigeraceae
- Genus: Lobariella
- Species: L. auriculata

Binomial name
- Lobariella auriculata B.Moncada & Lücking (2013)

Species of lichen

Lobariella auriculata is a species of foliose lichen in the family Peltigeraceae. This leafy lichen forms patches up to 10 centimeters across on tree trunks and branches in high-elevation cloud forests of the northern Andes. It is recognized by its distinctive flattened, ear-like reproductive structures with dark tips that emerge from pores on the lichen's surface, giving it a unique tufted texture. The species is currently known only from a few collections in Colombia and Peru, where it grows in sub-alpine zones near the tree line.

== Systematics ==
Lobariella auriculata was described in 2013 by the lichenologists Bibiana Moncada and Robert Lücking during their revision of the family Lobariaceae (now equivalent to Peltigeraceae subfamily Lobarioideae). Its specific epithet, auriculata, refers to the flattened, ear-like clusters of isidia ("auriculae") that emerge from surface pores. The species is morphologically and chemically distinct from the closely related L. subexornata: whereas L. subexornata bears cylindrical isidia and produces gyrophoric acid, L. auriculata develops flattened isidia with darkened tips and contains an unidentified secondary metabolite dubbed "Lobariella unidentified 3".

In a single-locus ITS maximum-likelihood tree, L. auriculata fell inside the well-supported L. pseudocrenulata–L. rugulosa clade together with L. angustata, clearly apart from the pallidocrenulata–crenulata complex. Because the pseudocrenulata–rugulosa clade is phylogenetically distinct from the pallida–crenulata lineage, the placement of L. auriculata in this group highlights its separate evolutionary trajectory within Lobariella despite superficial morphological similarities to pallida-complex species.

== Description ==
The thallus of L. auriculata is loosely attached to trunks and larger stems, forming patches up to about 10 cm (4 in) across. Its lobes are comparatively broad, measuring 7–15 mm (0.3–0.6 in) wide and roughly 5 cm (2 in) long. When moistened the upper surface is bright green, fading to pale grey on drying; pseudocyphellae develop along lobe tips and ridges. From these pores arise abundant isidia that begin as dark, spherical (globose outgrowths before flattening and branching irregularly, their tips remaining dark. These tufted, auriculate isidia give the lichen a distinctive texture and contribute to vegetative propagation.

The lower surface is dark grey-brown and densely covered with a felt of hairs (tomentum) and scattered dark rhizines that anchor the lichen to its substrate.

== Habitat and distribution ==
Lobariella auriculata is known from a few collections in Colombia and Peru, suggesting a distribution centred in the northern Andes. It occupies sub-alpine zones near the tree line, where it grows on trunks and branches in semi-shaded to semi-exposed cloud forest conditions.
