= Lobariella robusta =

Scientific classification
- Kingdom: Fungi
- Division: Ascomycota
- Class: Lecanoromycetes
- Order: Peltigerales
- Family: Peltigeraceae
- Genus: Lobariella
- Species: L. robusta

Binomial name
- Lobariella robusta Lücking, B.Moncada & C.W.Sm. (2017)

Species of lichen

Lobariella robusta is a species of foliose lichen in the family Peltigeraceae. Found in Hawaii, it was formally described as a new species in 2017 by lichenologists Robert Lücking Bibiana Moncada and Clifford Smith. The type specimen was collected by Smith from the Keck Observation Headquarters (Waimea) at an elevation of 822 m (2,697 ft). Here, in a mesic habitat with open-landscaped parkland, the lichen grows on tree trunks. Its thalli, closely attached to their substrate, are up to 5 cm (2 in) in diameter with a smooth, light green upper surface colour that becomes pale green-grey to yellowish grey after drying. It is only known to occur at the type locality. Secondary chemicals that are found in the lichen include pseudocyphellarin A, 4-O-methyl-gyrophoric acid, and gyrophoric acid. The specific epithet refers to the "rather robust, leathery thallus".
