= Lobariella ecorticata =

Scientific classification
- Kingdom: Fungi
- Division: Ascomycota
- Class: Lecanoromycetes
- Order: Peltigerales
- Family: Peltigeraceae
- Genus: Lobariella
- Species: L. ecorticata

Binomial name
- Lobariella ecorticata B.Moncada & Lücking (2013)

Species of lichen

Lobariella ecorticata is a species of foliose lichen in the family Peltigeraceae. The species was first scientifically described in 2013 from specimens collected from a single location in Colombia's high-elevation cloud forests. It is distinguished by its coral-like branching structures that lack a protective outer layer (cortex) on their undersides, giving the species its scientific name.

== Taxonomy ==
Lobariella ecorticata was described in 2013 by Bibiana Moncada and Robert Lücking. The epithet, ecorticata, refers to the species' distinctive phyllidia, whose undersides lack a cortex. Although compared with L. corallophora, it differs in having coralloid (branching, coral-like) phyllidia with a flattened base, a dark lower tomentum, and a contrasting chemistry: its medulla produces lecanoric acid (chemosyndrome A2) rather than gyrophoric acid.

A three-locus maximum-likelihood analysis recovered L. ecorticata as the well-supported sister species of L. stenroosiae, confirming that these two form a distinct lineage within Lobariella. Because the L. ecorticata + L. stenroosiae pair sits outside the larger pallida–crenulata complex, its chemistry (lecanoric acid medulla) and coral-like phyllidia appear to have evolved along an independent trajectory within the genus.

== Description ==
The thallus of L. ecorticata is tightly adnate to bark, forming patches up to about 12 cm (4.7 in) across. Lobes measure 5–10 mm (0.2–0.4 in) wide and as much as 5 cm (2 in) long, ending in truncate tips; the upper surface is pale gray to yellow-brown. Minute white spots develop into linear pseudocyphellae that serve as gas exchange pores. Along these pores arise coralloid phyllidia—tiny, branching outgrowths that resemble coral. Each phyllidium bears a corticate upper face but an ecorticate (skin-less) white underside and functions as a vegetative propagule. The lower surface carries a short, dark tomentum and gray-black rhizines that anchor the lichen.

== Habitat and distribution ==
Lobariella ecorticata is known only from its type locality, collected in a transition zone between sub-Andean cloud forest and high-elevation páramo. These shrubland-grassland habitats are characteristically mist-laden and humid. The combination of ecorticate coralloid phyllidia and dark rhizines are characteristics used to identify the lichen in the field. L. ecorticata is one of about 20 species of Lobariella that have been recorded from Colombia.
