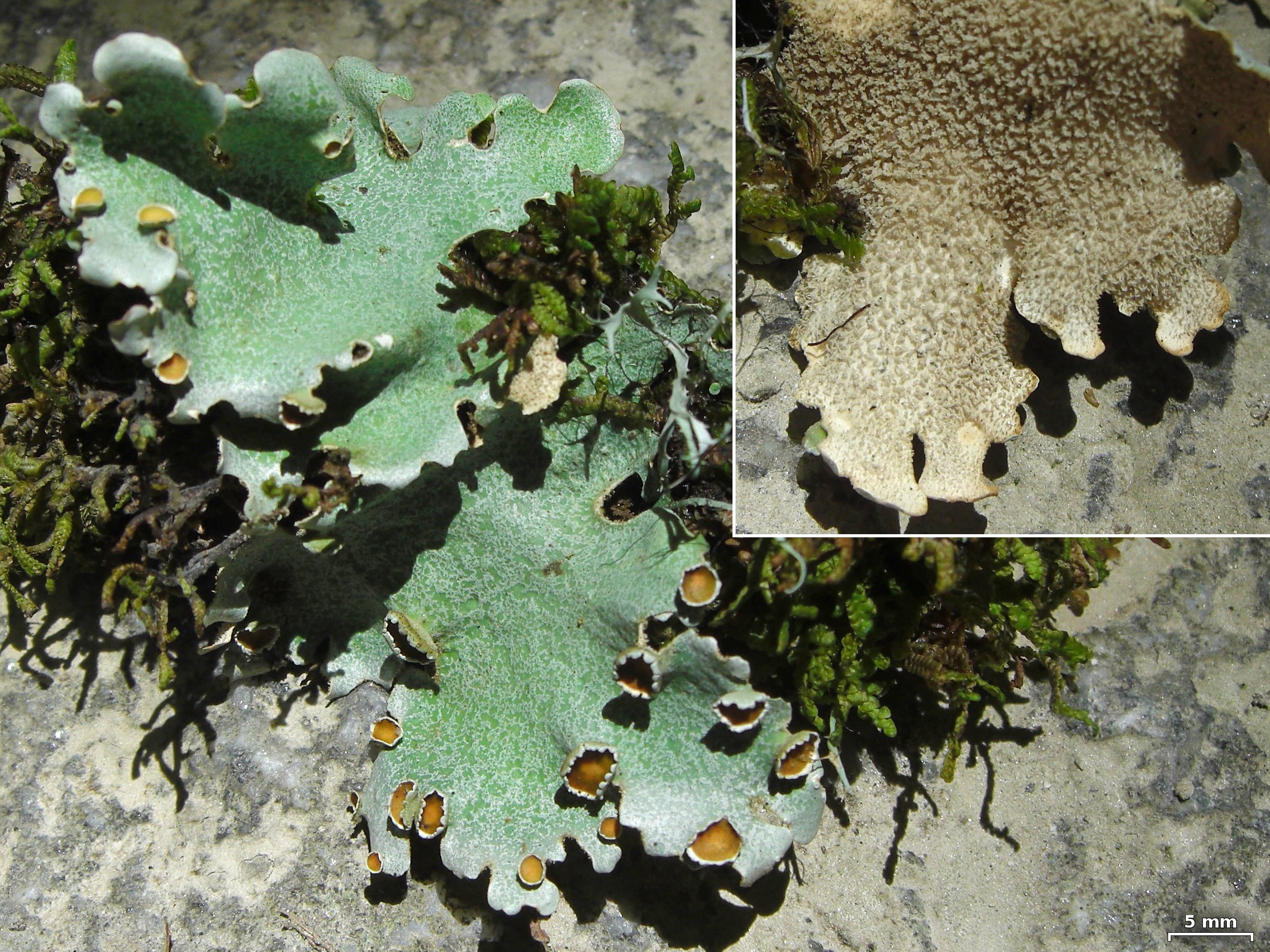
- in Machu Picchu, Peru

Scientific classification
- Kingdom: Fungi
- Division: Ascomycota
- Class: Lecanoromycetes
- Order: Peltigerales
- Family: Peltigeraceae
- Genus: Lobariella
- Species: L. reticulata

Binomial name
- Lobariella reticulata B.Moncada & Lücking (2013)

= Lobariella reticulata =

Species of lichen

Lobariella reticulata is a species of foliose lichen in the family Peltigeraceae. It is found in Colombia.

== Taxonomy ==
The lichen was formally described as a new species in 2013 by the lichenologists Bibiana Moncada and Robert Lücking. The type specimen was collected by the first author in Zona de Amortiguación, Mundo Nuevo, La Calera, Cundinamarca (Colombia) at elevations ranging from 2,900 to 3,100 m (9,500 to 10,200 ft).

== Description ==
Lobariella reticulata is known for its growth on thin trunks, stems, and branches. The thallus of this species can reach up to 8 cm (3.1 in) in diameter and is loosely attached to its substrate. Its photobiont is the green alga Dictyochloropsis. The individual lobes of Lobariella reticulata can grow up to 4 cm (1.6 in) long and are characterized by their irregular shape with incised apices and irregularly incised margins, measuring 5–10 mm in width. These lobes are irregularly branched, forming circular to irregular thallus rosettes. The upper surface of the lichen is pale green when hydrated, turning pale grey when dry, and often becomes pale yellowish grey in herbarium conditions. This surface is marked by dense, linear maculae forming a reticulate, white network, weakly contrasting with the surrounding thallus surface. The species lacks pseudocyphellae but often forms reticulate cracks towards the centre. Isidia are absent in this species.

The lower surface of Lobariella reticulata is cream-coloured to pale yellowish brown, featuring a very short, dense tomentum made up of hyphae composed of spherical cells. The tomentum is cream-coloured to pale yellowish brown, with discrete, white to pale yellowish brown rhizines that are unbranched or occasionally branched at the tip. These rhizines become darker towards the centre and are covered with tomentum up to their tips. The upper cortex of Lobariella reticulata is paraplectenchymatous, measuring 25–35 μm in thickness, with a 4–5 μm thick epicortex formed of 3–5 cell layers. The algal layer is 15–25 μm thick, while the medulla is between 100 and 150 μm thick. The lower cortex mirrors the upper in structure, being paraplectenchymatous and 10–15 μm thick, formed of 2–3 cell layers.

Apothecia (fruiting bodies) in Lobariella reticulata are abundant, cup-shaped, and can reach up to 7 mm in diameter, featuring thick, strongly prominent, crisp, pale grey margins. The lobules are very irregular, often branched or incised, and the disc is concave and orange-brown. The excipulum is composed of parallel, partly branched hyphae resembling a paraplectenchyma. The hymenium is clear, measuring 120–130 μm in height, with a yellow-orange, strongly conglutinated epithecium. Ascospores of Lobariella reticulata are narrowly fusiform, measuring 60–80 by 4–5 μm, with 7 septa and a hyaline appearance. Pycnidia were not observed in this species.

== Habitat and distribution ==
Lobariella reticulata is found in the páramo of Sumapaz near Bogotá, Colombia.
