= Lobariella flynniana =

Scientific classification
- Kingdom: Fungi
- Division: Ascomycota
- Class: Lecanoromycetes
- Order: Peltigerales
- Family: Peltigeraceae
- Genus: Lobariella
- Species: L. flynniana

Binomial name
- Lobariella flynniana Lücking, B.Moncada & C.W.Sm. (2017)

Species of lichen

Lobariella flynniana is a species of lichen in the family Peltigeraceae. Found in Hawaii, it was formally described as a new species in 2017 by lichenologists Robert Lücking Bibiana Moncada and Clifford Smith. The type specimen was collected from the western slopes of Mount Waialeale in Kōkeʻe State Park (Kauai) at an elevation of 1,250–1,350 m (4,100–4,430 ft). It is known to occur only at the type locality, a montane, mesic forest, where it grows on tree branches. The lichen thallus has numerous extensively branches lobules that give it a somewhat fruticose (bushy) appearance; this morphology is unique in the genus Lobariella. Secondary compounds that have been identified in Lobariella flynniana include pseudocyphellarin A, 4-O-methyl-gyrophoric acid, and gyrophoric acid. The specific epithet honours Timothy Flynn, the Herbarium Collections Manager at Kauai's National Tropical Botanical Garden, who assisted the authors with procuring the type.
