= Thomas Hawkes Nash III =

American lichenologist

- Born: November 13, 1945; Arlington, Virginia
- Education: Duke University; Rutgers University
- Known for: Lichen Flora of the Greater Sonoran Desert Region; 3 vols., 2002–2007
- Awards: Acharius Medal
- Scientific career
- Fields: Botany, lichenology
- Workplaces: Arizona State University
- Author abbrev. (botany): T.H.Nash

Thomas Hawkes Nash III (born November 13, 1945) is an American lichenologist. His research is about the biology and ecology of lichens, and the effects of air pollution on plants and lichens. He is known as an authority on the family Parmeliaceae. During his long career at the Arizona State University, he helped develop the lichen herbarium into a world-class collection with over 100,000 specimens representing more than 5000 species. In 2010, the year of his retirement, he was awarded the Acharius Medal for lifetime achievements in lichenology, and the following year had a Festschrift published in his honor.

== Biography ==
Nash was born in Arlington, Virginia, in 1945. He received a B.Sc. from Duke University in 1967. It was around this time that he was introduced to lichens by ecologist Larry Bliss; he would later take an advanced undergraduate class on lichens given by William Culberson, and a lichenology summer course given by Mason Hale. Nash later went on to earn an M.Sc. (1969, botany) and Ph.D. (1971, botany and statistics) from Rutgers University, under the supervision of ecologist Murray Fife Buell. His Ph.D. thesis, titled Effect of Effluents from a Zinc Factory on Lichens, was later published in the journal Ecological Monographs.

Shortly after graduation, he accepted an assistant professorship from Arizona State University in Tempe, where he has spent much of his scientific career. He was promoted to associate professor of botany in 1976, and became a full professor with this institution in 1981. He taught courses in ecology, lichenology, statistics, and, on one occasion, bryology. Nash retired from Arizona State University in 2010. For thirty years Nash and his students investigated Southern California's lichen communities and used them as biomonitors of air quality in the Los Angeles air basin. After his retirement, Nash volunteered with the Wisconsin State Herbarium at the University of Wisconsin–Madison.

Nash has developed a collection of over 110,000 lichen samples for the Arizona State University herbarium, for which he was the curator; about 40,000 of these were collected by Nash himself during his nearly four decades at Arizona State University. The collection features about 450 type specimens, and is represented by about 5,500 different species – about one-quarter of the known lichen species in the world. It is among the ten largest collections of lichens in the United States. Nash curated and edited the exsiccata series Lichenes exsiccati, distributed by Arizona State University. His research is largely focused on the biology of lichens and the effects of air pollution on plants. He uses an interdisciplinary approach to research, and the topics of his research publications include ecophysiology, ecology, taxonomy, floristics, and biomonitoring. He developed an interest in lichen physiology after working for a while with Otto Ludwig Lange at the University of Würzburg. Nash's interest in taxonomy developed with his work on the flora of the southwestern United States, and he is considered a leading expert in the family Parmeliaceae, particularly the genera Hypotrachyna and Xanthoparmelia.

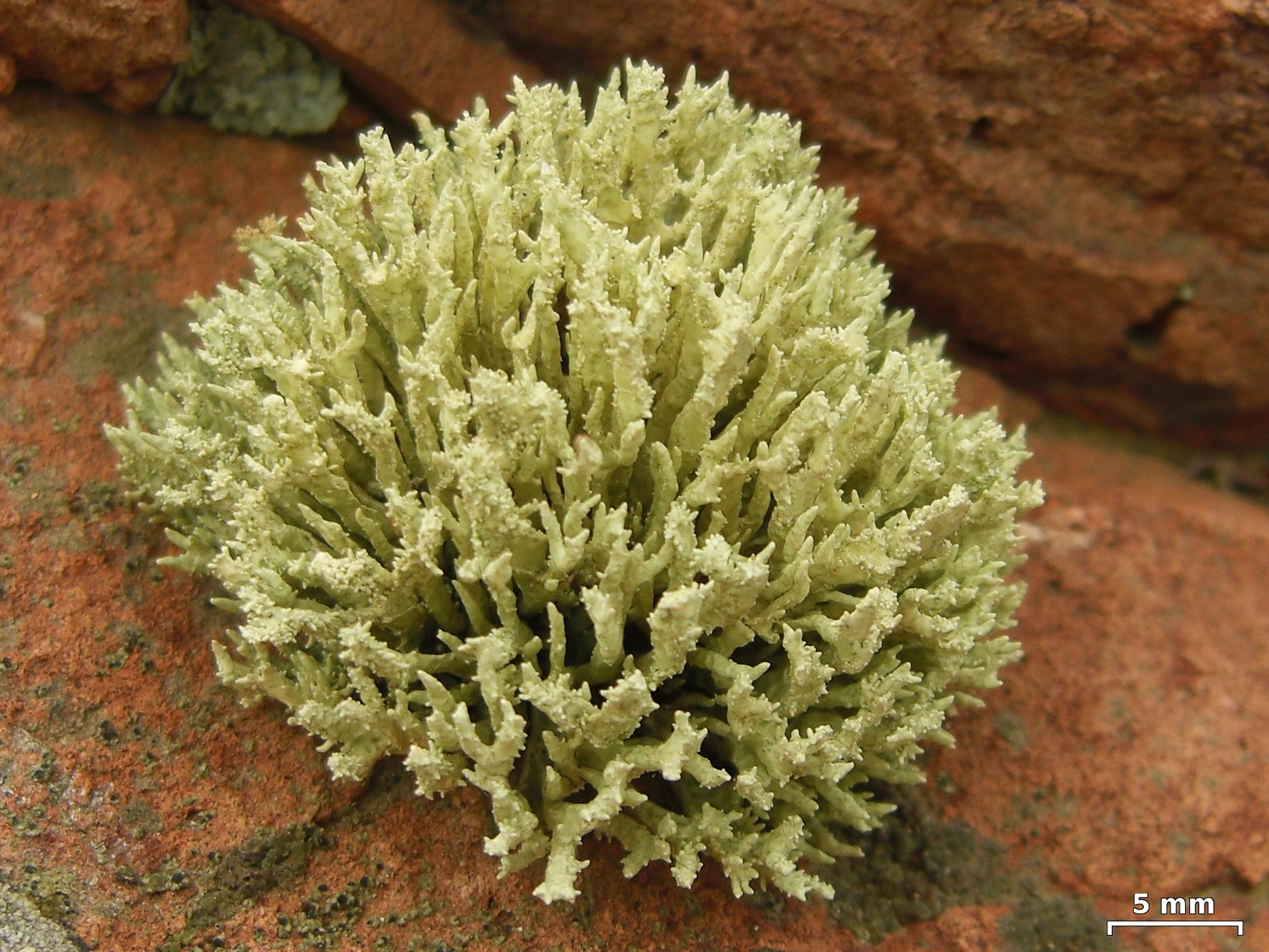
Niebla isidiaescens is one of many new species described by Nash and colleagues as a result of his research into the lichen flora of the southwestern United States.

Major works by Nash include a revision of Xanthoparmelia species in South America, a monograph on Hypotrachyna for the journal Flora Neotropica, and a three-volume set on the lichen flora of the Greater Sonoran Desert. The latter project, funded by the National Science Foundation, was a large collaborative work involving more than 90 scientists from 23 countries. Taking almost 18 years to complete, much of the effort was taken up through numerous field trips to hundreds of localities throughout the region. As a result, this work, which covers almost 2,000 species – about 40% of the lichens known in North America – is considered an "authoritative taxonomic treatment" that "profoundly increased the understanding of the lichen biodiversity of the Sonoran Desert and surrounding environs". These collecting expeditions resulted in the discovery of about 175 species new to science.

In 2008, Nash was the chair of the organizing committee for the sixth International Lichenological Symposium, which was held at the Asilomar Conference Grounds in Monterey, California. As of 2011, Nash had mentored 30 graduate students (19 Ph.D. and 11 Masters), and authored or co-authored more than 200 peer-reviewed scientific publications.

=== Personal ===
Thomas Nash is married to Corinna Gries, who is a professional in biodiversity informatics. She was a researcher in the Long Term Ecological Research Network in Arizona, and later at the University of Wisconsin.

== Memberships and awards ==
Nash was secretary of the International Association for Lichenology in the years 1971–1977, and the president of the American Bryological and Lichenological Society from 1981 to 1983. He was an associate editor for the scientific journal Bibliotheca Lichenologica from 1996 to 2008, and a member of several scientific societies: the American Institute of Biological Sciences, the Ecological Society of America, the Organization for Tropical Studies, and Sigma Xi.

Nash has been a Fulbright scholar, a fellow of the Arizona-Nevada Academy of Science, and thrice an Alexander von Humboldt fellow.

== Recognition ==
In 2010, Nash was awarded the Acharius Medal for lifetime achievements in lichenology. In 2011, he was honored with a Festschrift in the journal Bibliotheca Lichenologica. This volume, published on the occasion on his 65th birthday, contains 33 articles written by 70 authors.

=== Eponymy ===
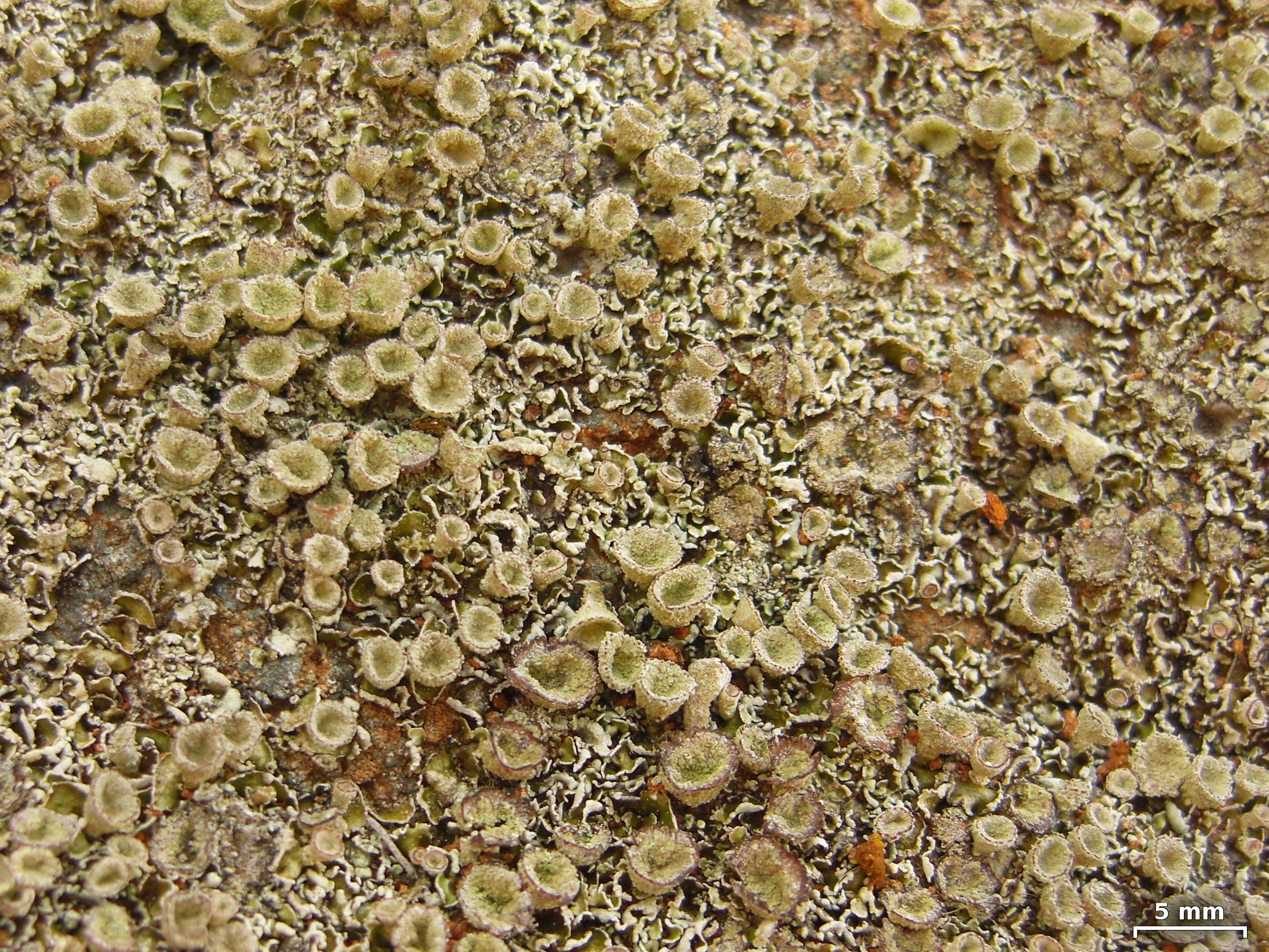
Cladonia nashii, pictured here from Palos Verdes, southern California, is one of many lichen species named after Nash.

There are many lichen species that have been named in honor of Thomas Nash. These include:

Xanthoparmelia nashii Elix & J.Johnst. (1986); Tephromela nashii Kalb (1991); Lecanactis nashii Egea & Torrente (1992); Physcia nashii Moberg (1997); Usnea nashii P.Clerc & Herrera-Camp. (1997); Evicentia nashii Barreno (2000); Harpidium nashii Scheid. (2000); Caloplaca nashii Nav.-Ros., Gaya & Hladún (2001); Cladonia nashii Ahti (2002); Plectocarpon nashii Hafellner (2002); Toninia nashii Timdal (2002); Fusicladium nashicola K.Schub. & U.Braun (2003); Gyalectidium nashii Herrera-Camp. & Lücking (2003); Phaeophyscia nashii Essl. (2004); Buellia nashii Bungartz (2004); Fellhanera nashii van den Boom (2004); Lecanora nashii B.D.Ryan (2004); Lecidella nashiana Knoph & Leuckert (2004); Sticta nashii D.J.Galloway (2004); Aspicilia nashii Owe-Larss. & A.Nordin (2007); Tremella nashii Diederich (2007); Acarospora nashii K.Knudsen (2011); Buellia tomnashiana Giralt & van den Boom (2011); Caloplaca tomnashii S.Y.Kondr., Elix & Kärnefelt 2011); Bulbothrix thomasiana Benatti & Marcelli (2011); Niebla nashii Sipman (2011); Canoparmelia nashii Jungbluth & Marcelli (2011); Punctelia nashii Marcelli & Canêz (2011); Lobariella nashii Moncada & Lücking (2013). The genus Trinathotrema Lücking, Rivas Plata & Mangold (2011) (family Stictidaceae) also honors Nash; it is constructed from parts of his name: tho from Thomas, na from Nash and tri referring to III. Tomnashia S.Y.Kondr. & Hur (2017) (family Teloschistaceae) is another generic eponym.

== Selected publications ==
A comprehensive list of Nash's publication from the period 1971 to 2010 is given in Bates and colleagues' 2011 Festschrift. Some representative publications include:

=== Books ===
- Nash III, Thomas H.; Wirth, Volkmar, eds. (1988). Lichens, Bryophytes and Air Quality. Bibliotheca Lichenologica. Vol. 30. Berlin: J. Cramer. ISBN 978-3-443-58009-4.
- Nash III, Thomas H., ed. (1996). Lichen Biology. Cambridge: Cambridge University Press. ISBN 978-0-521-45974-7. (reprinted in 2008)
- Nash III, T. H.; Ryan, B. D.; Gries, C.; Bungartz, F., eds. (2002). Lichen Flora of the Greater Sonoran Desert Region. Vol. 1. The Pyrenolichens and most of the Squamulose and Macrolichens. Tempe: Lichens Unlimited, Arizona State University, Department of Plant Biology. ISBN 978-0-9716759-0-2.
- Nash III, T. H.; Ryan, B. D.; Diederich, P.; Gries, C.; Bungartz, F., eds. (2004). Lichen Flora of the Greater Sonoran Desert Region. Vol. 2. Most of the Microlichens, Balance of the Macrolichens, and Lichenicolous Fungi. Tempe: Lichens Unlimited, Arizona State University, Department of Plant Biology. ISBN 978-0-9716759-1-9.
- Nash III, T. H.; Gries, C.; F., Bungartz, eds. (2007). Lichen Flora of the Greater Sonoran Desert Region. Vol. 3. Balance of the Microlichens, and the Lichenicolous Fungi. Tempe: Lichens Unlimited, Arizona State University, Department of Plant Biology. ISBN 978-0-9716759-1-9.

=== Articles ===
- Sigal, Lorene L.; Nash III, T. H. (1983). "Lichen communities on conifers in southern California mountains: An ecological survey relative to oxidant air pollution". Ecology. 64 (6): 1343–1354. Bibcode:1983Ecol...64.1343S. doi:10.2307/1937489. JSTOR 1937489.
- Boonpragob, Kansri; Nash III, T. H. (1991). "Physiological responses of the lichen Ramalina menziesii Tayl. to the Los Angeles urban environment". Environmental and Experimental Botany. 31 (2): 229–238. Bibcode:1991EnvEB..31..229B. doi:10.1016/0098-8472(91)90075-Y.
- Ernst-Russell, Michael A.; Elix, John A.; Chai, Christina L.L.; Willis, Anthony C.; Hamada, Nobuo; Nash III, T. H. (1999). "Hybocarpone, a novel cytotoxic naphthazarin derivative from mycobiont cultures of the lichen Lecanora hybocarpa". Tetrahedron Letters. 40 (34): 6321–6324. doi:10.1016/S0040-4039(99)01220-4.
- Zambrano, A.; Nash III, T.H. (2000). "Lichen responses to short-term transplantation in Desierto de los Leones, Mexico City". Environmental Pollution. 107 (3): 407–412. Bibcode:2000EPoll.107..407Z. doi:10.1016/S0269-7491(99)00169-4.
- Herrera-Campos, M.A.; Nash III, T.H.; Zambrano, A. (2001). "A revision of the Usnea fragilescens group for Mexico". Bryologist. 104: 235–259. doi:10.1639/0007-2745(2001)104[0235:PSOTUF]2.0.CO;2. S2CID 86233759.
- Hafellner, J.; Triebel, D.; Ryan, B.D.; Nash III, T.H. (2002). "On lichenicolous fungi from North America II". Mycotaxon. 84: 293–329. doi:10.5962/p.418297.
- Nash III, T.H.; Gries, C. (2002). "Lichens as bioindicators of sulfur dioxide" (PDF). Symbiosis. 33 (1): 1–21.
- Zschau, T.; Getty, S.; Gries, C.; Ameron, Y.; Zambrano, A.; Nash III, T.H. (2003). "Historical and current atmospheric deposition to the epilithic lichen Xanthoparmelia in Maricopa County, Arizona". Environmental Pollution. 125 (1): 21–30. Bibcode:2003EPoll.125...21Z. doi:10.1016/S0269-7491(03)00088-5. PMID 12804824.
- Bungartz, F.; Garvie, L.A.J.; Nash III, T.H. (2004). "Anatomy of the endolithic Sonoran Desert lichen Verrucaria rubrocincta Breuss: implications for biodeterioration and biomineralization". Lichenologist. 36 (1): 55–73. Bibcode:2004ThLic..36...55B. doi:10.1017/S0024282904013854. S2CID 86211017.
- Riddell, Jennifer; Nash III, Thomas H.; Padgett, Pamela (2008). "The effect of HNO_{3} gas on the lichen Ramalina menziesii". Flora - Morphology, Distribution, Functional Ecology of Plants. 203 (1): 47–54. doi:10.1016/j.flora.2007.10.001.
- Bates, Scott T.; Nash III, T. H.; Sweat, Ken G.; Garcia-Pichel, Ferran (2010). "Fungal communities of lichen-dominated biological soil crusts: Diversity, relative microbial biomass, and their relationship to disturbance and crust cover". Journal of Arid Environments. 74 (10): 1192–1199. Bibcode:2010JArEn..74.1192B. doi:10.1016/j.jaridenv.2010.05.033.

== See also ==
- Category:Taxa named by Thomas Hawkes Nash III
