= Lobariella sandwicensis =

Scientific classification
- Kingdom: Fungi
- Division: Ascomycota
- Class: Lecanoromycetes
- Order: Peltigerales
- Family: Peltigeraceae
- Genus: Lobariella
- Species: L. sandwicensis

Binomial name
- Lobariella sandwicensis Lücking, B.Moncada & C.W.Sm. (2017)

Species of lichen

Lobariella sandwicensis is a species of foliose lichen in the family Peltigeraceae. Found in Hawaii, it was formally described as a new species in 2017 by lichenologists Robert Lücking Bibiana Moncada and Clifford Smith. The type specimen was collected from the western slopes of Mount Waialeale in Kōkeʻe State Park (Kauai) at an elevation between 1,250 and 1,350 m (4,100 and 4,430 ft). It is the most common species of Lobariella in Hawaii, and has been recorded from mesic habitats in mountainous forests on the islands of Kauai, Maui, and Oahu, but not from Hawaii. The specific epithet refers to the Sandwich Islands, a historical name for Hawaii.
