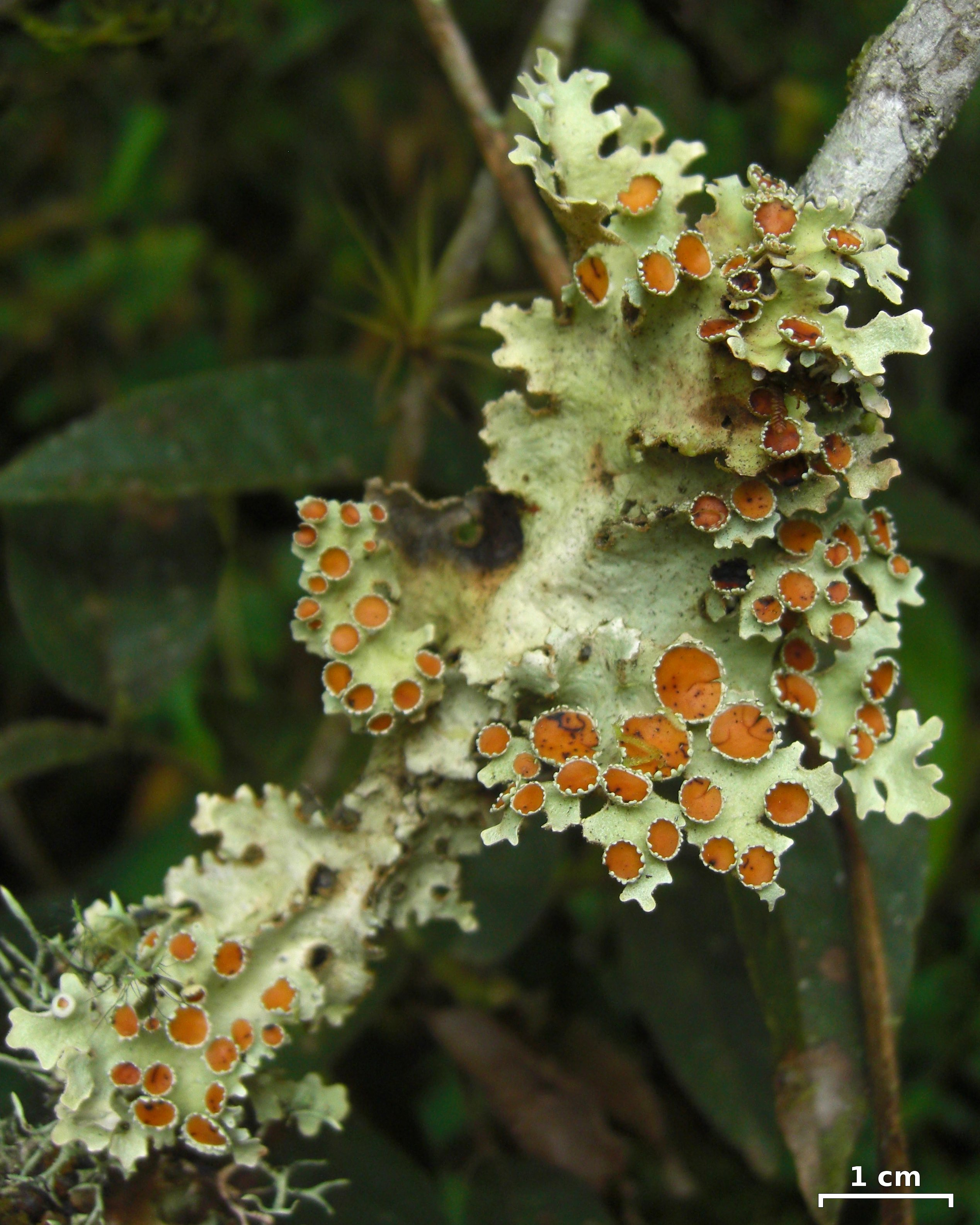
- in Machu Picchu, Peru

Scientific classification
- Kingdom: Fungi
- Division: Ascomycota
- Class: Lecanoromycetes
- Order: Peltigerales
- Family: Peltigeraceae
- Genus: Lobariella
- Species: L. pallida

Binomial name
- Lobariella pallida (Hook.) B.Moncada & Lücking (2011)

Synonyms
- Sticta pallida Hook. (1822); Parmelia fulvella Taylor (1847); Ricasolia pallida (Hook.) Nyl. (1858); Lobaria pallida (Hook.) Trevis. (1869); Durietzia pallida (Hook.) Yoshim. (1998)

= Lobariella pallida =

Species of lichen

Lobariella pallida is a species of corticolous (bark-dwelling), foliose lichen in the family Peltigeraceae. It was first formally described in 1822 by English botanist William Jackson Hooker, as a member of the genus Sticta. Bibiana Moncada and Robert Lücking transferred it to the genus Lobariella in 2011. The lichen occurs in páramo regions of Central and South America, where it grows on twigs and thin stems of shrubs and small trees. It is the most common species in its genus. Although it typically grows in association with other lichens, its quite loose attachment to its substrate means it does not take up much surface space.

Secondary chemicals (lichen products) present in Lobariella pallida include lobariellin (methyl 3-formyl-2,4-dihydroxy-5,6-dimethylbenzoate) and methyl orsellinate.
