= Sanguineodiscus =

Scientific classification
- Domain: Eukaryota
- Kingdom: Fungi
- Division: Ascomycota
- Class: Lecanoromycetes
- Order: Teloschistales
- Family: Teloschistaceae
- Genus: Sanguineodiscus; I.V.Frolov & Vondrák (2020)

Type species
- Sanguineodiscus viridirufus (Ach.) I.V.Frolov & Vondrák (2020)

Species
- S. aractinus S. bicolor S. haematites S. viridirufus

Genus of lichen-forming fungi

Sanguineodiscus is a genus of lichen-forming fungi in the family Teloschistaceae. It is characterized by its deep red apothecial discs, found predominantly in the Mediterranean basin, Central Asia, Northern Africa, and Europe. This genus comprises both saxicolous (growing on rocks) and corticolous (growing on tree bark) species, which are found in various habitats, such as inland rain-sheltered base-rich siliceous rocks, seashore siliceous rocks, and calcareous outcrops in Central Asia. Sanguineodiscus, established in 2023, contains four recognized species, but it is believed that the genus contains more unnamed taxa.

== Taxonomy ==
The genus Sanguineodiscus was circumscribed by Ivan Valerievich Frolov and Jan Vondrák in 2020. The type species is Sanguineodiscus viridirufus. The name of the genus is derived from the Latin word sanguineous ("deep red"), which refers to the colour of the apothecial discs.

== Description ==
Sanguineodiscus species have crustose, epilithic or epiphytic thalli, which can be white to dark gray. The cortex is paraplectenchymatous, and the thallus and thalline exciple contain Sedifolia-gray but lack anthraquinones. The apothecia are zeorine or seemingly lecanorine with a thin true exciple always present. The disc is typically dark to pale red, though some individuals may have black or brown discs without anthraquinones. Ascospores are polaridiblastic, ellipsoid, and have medium to large long septa.

== Habitat and distribution ==
Sanguineodiscus lichens are distributed across Europe, Northern Africa, and Asia, with the main occurrence in the Mediterranean basin and Central Asia. They are both saxicolous and corticolous, growing on inland rain-sheltered base-rich siliceous rocks, seashore siliceous rocks, calcareous outcrops in Central Asia, and on deciduous and coniferous trees and shrubs, predominantly in Mediterranean regions and Macaronesia.

== Species ==
There are currently four recognized species in the Sanguineodiscus genus:

- Sanguineodiscus aractinus (Fr.) I.V.Frolov & Vondrák (2020)
- Sanguineodiscus bicolor (H.Magn.) I.V.Frolov & Vondrák (2020)
- Sanguineodiscus haematites (Chaub.) I.V.Frolov & Vondrák (2020)
- Sanguineodiscus viridirufus (Ach.) I.V.Frolov & Vondrák (2020)

More unnamed taxa are believed to exist within the genus, both saxicolous and corticolous.
