= Cephalophysis =

Scientific classification
- Kingdom: Fungi
- Division: Ascomycota
- Class: Lecanoromycetes
- Order: Teloschistales
- Family: Teloschistaceae
- Genus: Cephalophysis (Hertel) H.Kilias (1985)

Type species
- Cephalophysis leucospila (Anzi) H.Kilias & Scheid. (1985)

Synonyms
- Lecidea subgen. Cephalophysis Hertel (1967)

Genus of lichens

Cephalophysis is a lichen genus in the family Teloschistaceae. It is a monotypic genus, containing the single species Cephalophysis leucospila.
