= Xanthopeltis =

Scientific classification
- Domain: Eukaryota
- Kingdom: Fungi
- Division: Ascomycota
- Class: Lecanoromycetes
- Order: Teloschistales
- Family: Teloschistaceae
- Genus: Xanthopeltis; R. Sant.

Type species
- Xanthopeltis rupicola R. Sant.

Genus of fungi

Xanthopeltis is a genus of lichenized fungi in the family Teloschistaceae. This is a monotypic genus, containing the single species Xanthopeltis rupicola.
