= Ovealmbornia =

Scientific classification
- Domain: Eukaryota
- Kingdom: Fungi
- Division: Ascomycota
- Class: Lecanoromycetes
- Order: Teloschistales
- Family: Teloschistaceae
- Genus: Ovealmbornia; S.Y.Kondr., Fedorenko, S.Stenroos, Kaernefelt, Elix & A.Thell 2009

Type species
- Ovealmbornia reginae S.Y. Kondr., Kärnefelt & Hur (2015)

Genus of lichens

Ovealmbornia is a monotypic genus of mostly foliose lichen species in the subfamily Xanthorioideae of the family Teloschistaceae. It now only contains one known species, Ovealmbornia reginae as others were classed as synonyms of other species in the same family.

The genus was circumscribed by Sergei Yakovlevich Kondratyuk, Natalya M. Fedorenko, Soili Kristina Stenroos, Ingvar Kärnefelt, John Alan 'Jack' Elix and Arne Thell in Biblioth. Lichenol. vol.100 on page 75 in 2009.

The genus name of Ovealmbornia is in honour of Ove Almborn (1914-1992), who was a Swedish (university training-)teacher, botanist (Lichenology). "This genus is named in honour of the Swedish lichenologist Ove Almborn who contributed extensively to our knowledge of the lichen flora of Africa." (from the journal)

== Former species ==
- O. bonae-spei (S.Y. Kondr. & Kärnefelt) S.Y. Kondr., Fedorenko, S. Stenroos, Kärnefelt, Elix & A. Thell (2009) = Dufourea bonae-spei, Teloschistaceae family
- O. volkmarwirthii S.Y. Kondr. (2014) = Dufourea volkmarwirthii, Teloschistaceae family
