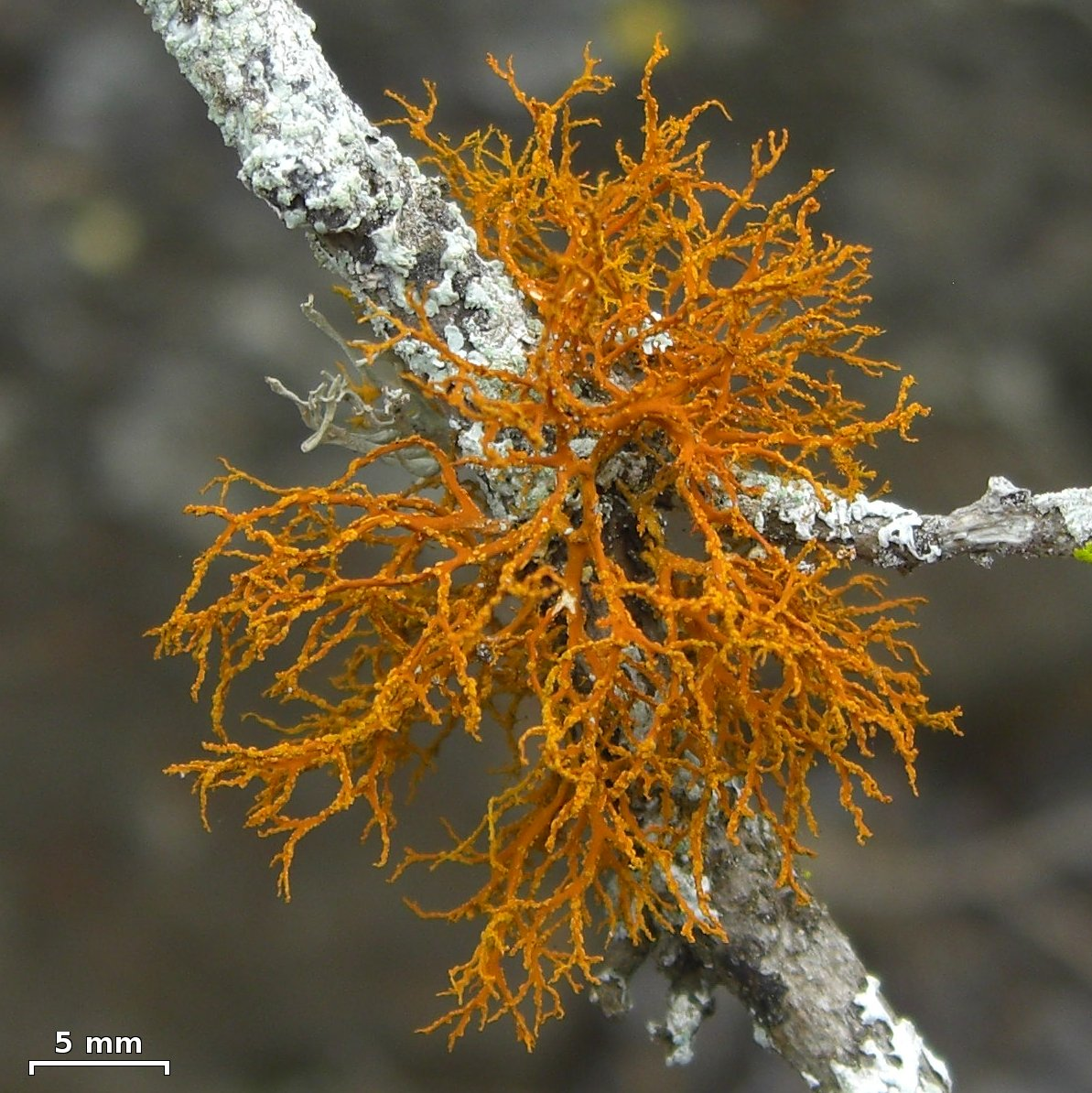
- Teloschistes flavicans is the type species of the type genus of the family Teloschistaceae.

Scientific classification
- Kingdom: Fungi
- Division: Ascomycota
- Class: Lecanoromycetes
- Order: Teloschistales
- Family: Teloschistaceae; Zahlbr. (1898)

Type genus
- Teloschistes Norman (1853)

Subfamilies
- Caloplacoideae – 37 genera Teloschistoideae – 33 genera Xanthorioideae – 45 genera

Synonyms
- Caloplacaceae Zahlbr. (1907)

= Teloschistaceae =

Family of lichen-forming fungi

The Teloschistaceae are a large family of mostly lichen-forming fungi belonging to the class Lecanoromycetes in the division Ascomycota. The family has a cosmopolitan distribution, although its members occur predominantly in temperate regions. Most members are lichens that either live on rock or on bark, but about 40 species are lichenicolous – meaning they are non-lichenised fungi that live on other lichens. Many members of the Teloschistaceae are readily identifiable by their vibrant orange to yellow hue, a result of their frequent anthraquinone content. The presence of these anthraquinone pigments, which confer protection from ultraviolet light, enabled this group to expand from shaded forest habitats to harsher environmental conditions of sunny and arid ecosystems during the Late Cretaceous.

Teloschistaceae lichens typically have one of a few physical growth forms. Depending on the species, the thallus (the main body of the lichen) is either leaf-like (foliose), bushy or shrub-like (fruticose), or crust-like (crustose). These lichens typically partner with a photosynthetic companion (a photobiont) from the green algal genus Trebouxia. Teloschistaceae members are also characterised by their apothecia (the fruiting bodies where sexual reproduction occurs), which generally have a well-defined encircling rim of tissue. In the Teloschistaceae, the tip of the ascus, the structure that produces spores, characteristically turns blue when stained with iodine. The ascospores are released through a longitudinal slit in the ascus tip, a unique trait common to this family of lichens.

The family, first formally proposed in 1898, was extensively revised in 2013, including the creation or resurrection of 31 genera. Three subfamilies – Caloplacoideae, Teloschistoideae, and Xanthorioideae – are recognised. Since 2013, several dozen new genera have been added to the family, but there has been some debate about these additions. Ongoing DNA studies are helping to provide clearer insights into how the different groups within this family are related. The family contains more than 1,000 species in around 125 genera. Three species from the Teloschistaceae have been globally assessed for conservation status and others, such as the rare New Zealand species Caloplaca allanii, appear on regional lists. The full diversity of this family remains underexplored in vast regions like South America and China. Regarding human interactions and applications, although lacking any major economic impact, several rock-dwelling Teloschistaceae species are known to damage marble surfaces, and others are used in some traditional medicines. One member, Rusavskia elegans, is used in research as a model organism to investigate resilience against the harsh conditions of outer space.

== Systematics ==
=== Historical taxonomy ===
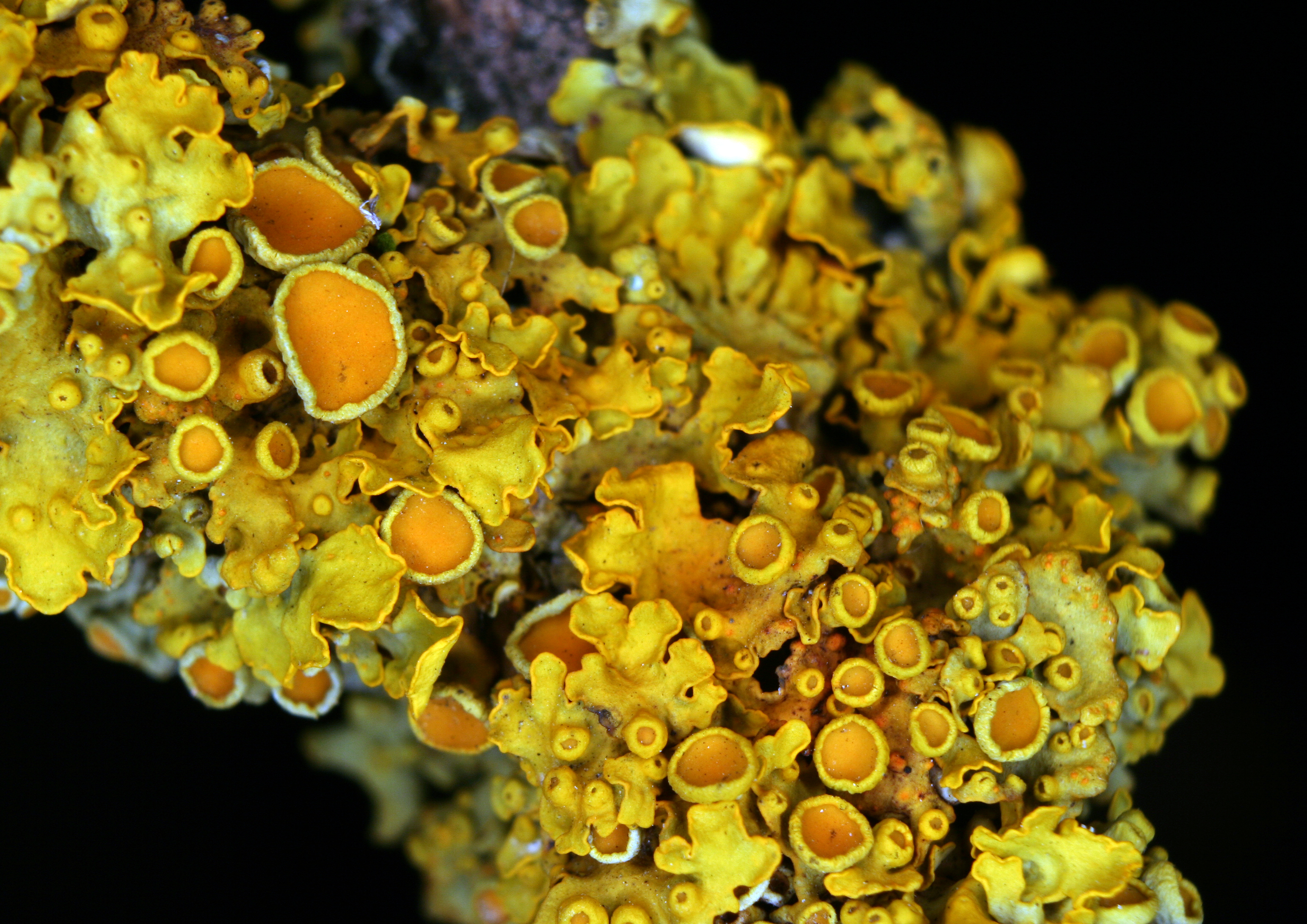
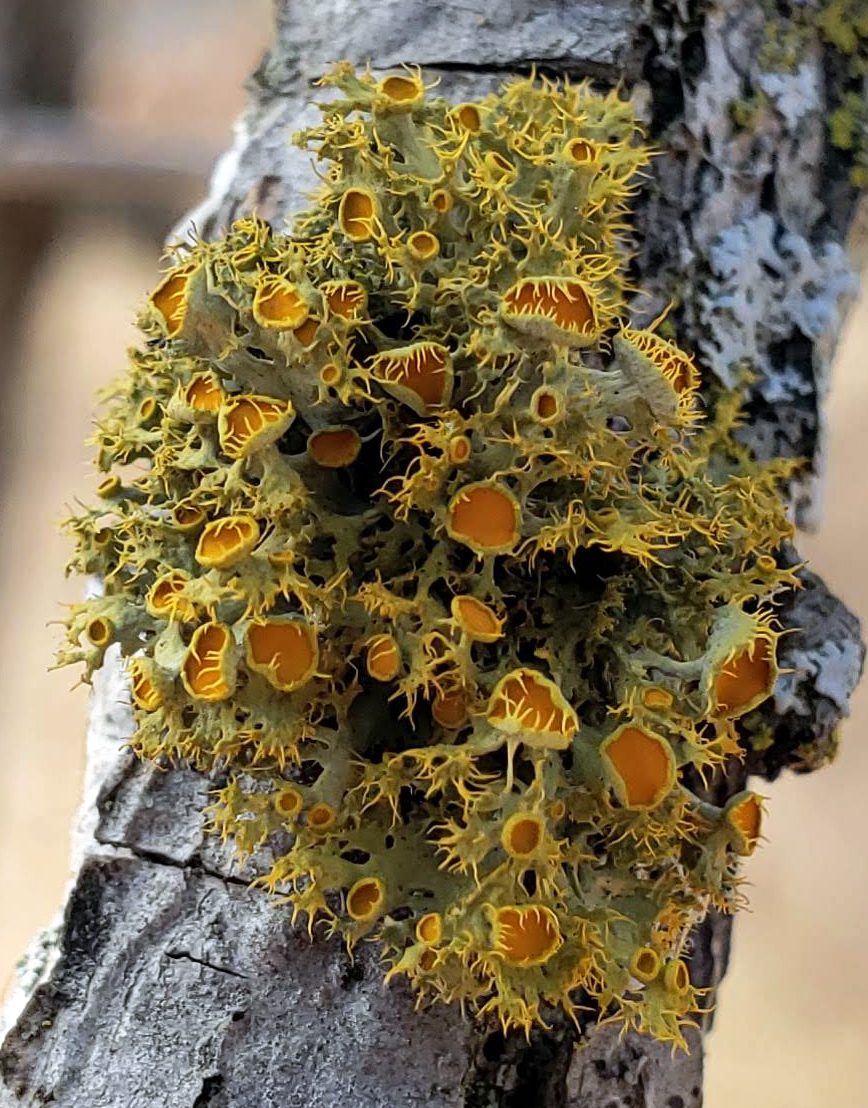
The common and widespread Teloschistaceae species Xanthoria parietina (left) and Teloschistes chrysophthalmus (right) were two of the earliest lichens to be formally described.

The first members of the present-day Teloschistaceae to be formally described were the common sunburst lichen (Xanthoria parietina) and the gold-eye lichen (Teloschistes chrysophthalmus). These were two of several dozen lichen species described by the Swedish taxonomist Carl Linnaeus, the former in his influential 1753 treatise Species Plantarum, and the latter in his 1771 work Mantissa Plantarum Altera.

In his 1852 work Synopsis Lichenum Blasteniosporum ('Synopsis of Lichen Blasteniospores'), the lichenologist Abramo Bartolommeo Massalongo attempted to classify what he called "blasteniospore lichens". This term referenced species, diverse in growth forms and appearance, united by the distinct polarilocular spores now attributed to the family Teloschistaceae. These are spores that are divided into two compartments (locules) separated by a central septum with a small hole. Although Massalongo's efforts to arrange these taxa into more natural genera were largely ignored by subsequent researchers, several of his proposed genera were resurrected for use 16 decades later, such as Blastenia, Gyalolechia, Pyrenodesmia, and Xanthocarpia.

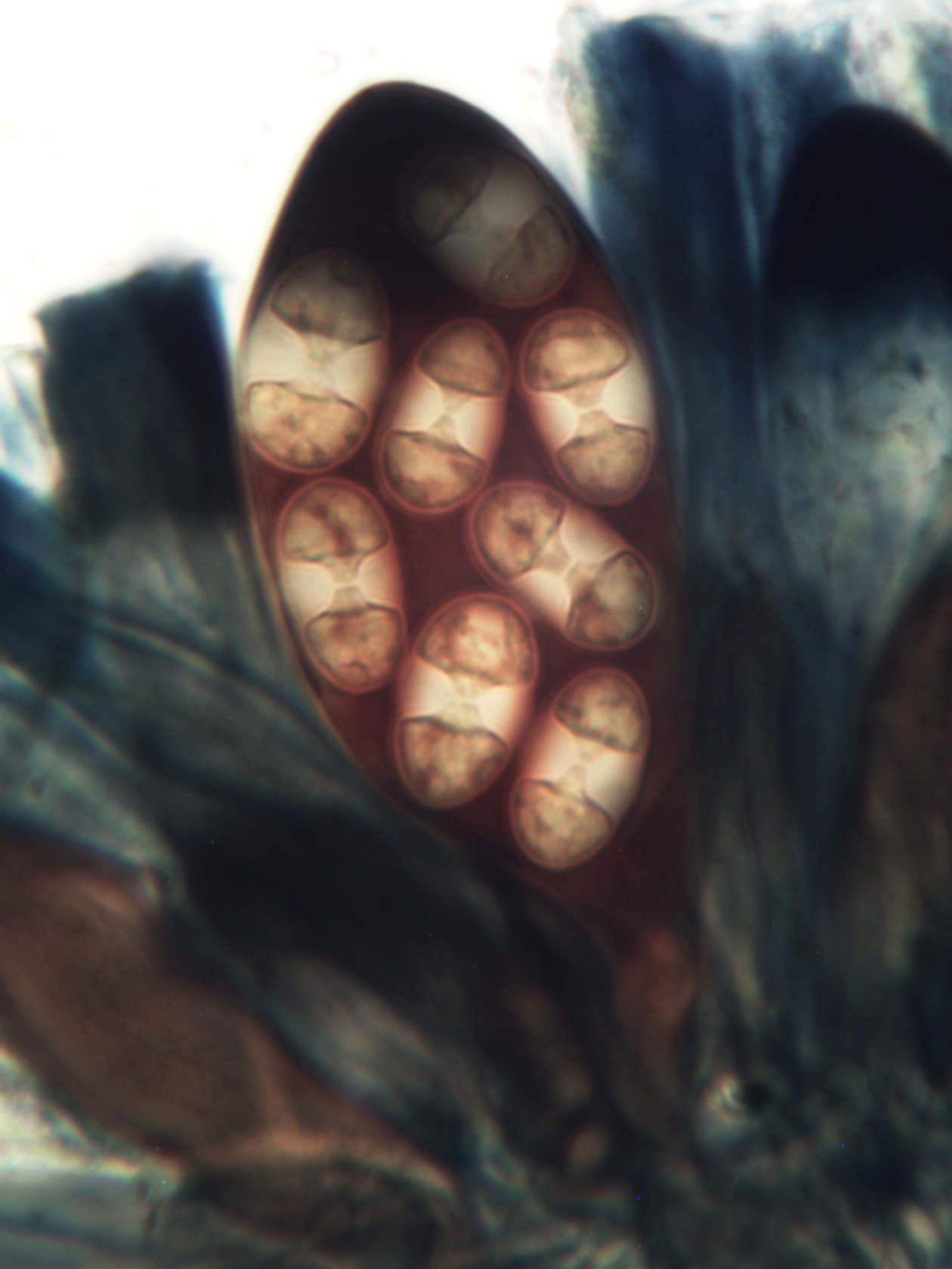
An ascus of the crustose lichen Pyrenodesmia variabilis, containing eight polarilocular ascospores

The family Teloschistaceae was formally circumscribed by the lichenologist Alexander Zahlbruckner in 1898. In his initial version, he grouped together foliose and fruticose taxa having polarilocular (i.e. two-locule) or four-locule ascospores, including the genera Xanthoria, Teloschistes, and Lethariopsis. At that time, the growth form of the lichen thalli was often used in classical lichen taxonomy to segregate groups of species into families, and so in a subsequent (1926) publication, Zahlbruckner introduced the family Caloplacaceae to contain crustose lichens with polarilocular ascospores; this family included the genera Caloplaca, Blastenia, Bombyliospora, and Protoblastenia. The distinctness of the family Caloplacaceae was largely rejected by other authors, and it is now a historical synonym of Teloschistaceae. In another older classification, crustose genera were grouped together in the family Blasteniaceae or the Placodiaceae. (Note: Neither Blasteniaceae C.W.Dodge & G.E.Baker (1938) nor Placodiaceae A.Fisch. (1871) are synonyms of Teloschistaceae, because neither of these families were published validly.) In 1971, Carroll William Dodge proposed the family Xanthoriaceae to contain Xanthodactylon, Xanthopeltis, and Xanthoria, but it was not validly published.

In the 20th century, particularly with the widespread use of electron microscopy, the details of ascus structure became important considerations in the taxonomy of lichen-forming fungi. Studies on several Teloschistaceae species have noted the consistent presence of a cap-like zone at the tip of the ascus that shows a strong reaction to iodine, characteristic of amyloid substances. Using advanced transmission electron microscopy, Rosmarie Honegger confirmed a unique type of ascus in Teloschistaceae, later named the Teloschistes-type. This ascus is distinguished by a special outer layer that reacts to certain stains and lacks the typical structures seen at the tip, opening in an unusual pattern during spore release. The presence of this ascus type was later used as a diagnostic character for the family Teloschistaceae following an ultrastructural study that corroborated Honegger's work. In 1989 Ingvar Kärnefelt revised the family, accepting ten genera, and this served as the main taxonomic classification for the family until the molecular era. In one of the last classifications of the family before the widespread use and implementation of molecular techniques, the Outline of the Ascomycota accepted 12 genera in Teloschistaceae in 2006: Caloplaca, Cephalophysis, Fulgensia, Huea, Ioplaca, Josefpoeltia, Seirophora, Teloschistes, Xanthodactylon, Xanthomendoza, Xanthopeltis, and Xanthoria. The family continues to undergo significant changes. For example, in 2020, of all fungal families, Teloschistaceae had the fourth-highest number of new fungal names (a total of 128), including 8 genera, 48 new species and infraspecific (Note: The term "infraspecific" refers to a taxonomic rank below that of species, including subspecies, variety, and form.) taxa, and 72 new combinations.

=== Etymology ===
As is standard practice in botanical nomenclature, the name Teloschistaceae is based on the name of the type genus, Teloschistes, with the ending -aceae indicating the rank of family. The genus name, assigned by the Norwegian botanist Johannes M. Norman in 1852, comprises two Ancient Greek words: τέλος (télos), meaning 'end', 'final', or 'term'; and σχιστός (-schistós), meaning 'divided into', 'split', or 'separated'. It refers to the split ends of the thallus branches that are characteristic of that genus.

=== Subfamilial and ordinal classification ===
- - Teloschistales
    - Teloschistaceae
      - - Teloschistoideae
          - - - Hosseusiella
              - - Tassiloa
                - - Villophora
                  - - Teloschistes
                    - Josefpoeltia
            - - - Stellarangia
                - - - Kaernefia
                    - - 'Caloplaca' sp.5
                      - - - - Wilketalia
                            - - Sirenophila
                              - Elixjohnia
                          - Haloplaca
                        - Teloschistopsis
                  - - - Brownliella
                      - Neobrownliella
                    - - Filsoniana
                      - Nevilleiella
              - - Aridoplaca
                - - Follmannia
                  - Harusavskia
          - - - Wetmoreana
              - - Scutaria
                - Cinnabaria
            - Catenarina
        - Xanthorioideae
          - Shackletonia
          - - - - Pachypeltis
                - Parvoplaca
              - Xanthomendoza
            - - - Squamulea
                - - Huriella
                  - Amundsenia
              - - - Xanthocarpia
                  - - - - Cerothallia
                        - Gondwania
                      - Austroplaca
                    - - Xanthopeltis
                      - Teuvoahtiana
                - - Charcotiana
                  - - - Flavoplaca
                      - Calogaya
                    - - - Orientophila
                        - - Xanthoria
                          - Dufourea
                      - - Athallia
                        - - Solitaria
                          - Polycauliona
      - - Caloplacoideae
          - - 'Caloplaca' brebissoni
            - - - - - - Teuvoahtiana
                      - - Franwilsia
                        - Eilifdahlia
                    - 'Caloplaca' spp. 1 & 2
                  - Gyalolechia
                - - - - 'Caloplaca' lecanorocarpa
                      - 'Caloplaca' lecapustulata
                    - Huneckia
                  - 'Caloplaca' quadrilocularis
              - Blastenia
          - - - Bryoplaca
              - - Kuettlingeria furax
                - - Rufoplaca
                  - Usnochroma
            - - - - Seirophora
                  - Variospora
                - - Caloplaca
                  - Leproplaca
              - - - - Kuettlingeria atroflava
                    - Kuettlingeria albolutescens
                  - Pyrenodesmia
                - Olegblumia demissa
    - Brigantiaeaceae
      - Brigantiaea sp.
      - Letrouitia vulpina

Cladogram showing the phylogeny of some species and genera in family Teloschistaceae and in the order Teloschistales; based on analysis by Wilk et al. in 2021 (simplified from original). Species names have been updated to reflect current taxonomy. Single quote marks around a genus name means that the species is likely misclassified.

Teloschistaceae is divided into three recognised subfamilies: Xanthorioideae, Caloplacoideae, and Teloschistoideae. In 2015, researchers proposed a fourth subfamily, Brownlielloideae, which was later shown by genetic studies to be a grouping based on mixed or misinterpreted data rather than a distinct lineage. Further analysis placed what was thought to be Brownlielloideae within the already established Teloschistoideae, suggesting the proposed subfamily was not a separate branch of the family tree. DNA evidence also dispersed members of the informally introduced subfamily Ikaerioideae across the three acknowledged subfamilies, primarily within Teloschistoideae. Despite this, Sergey Kondratyuk and colleagues continue to use Brownlielloideae and Ikaerioideae in their publications, assigning nine genera to the former and two to the latter. The well-supported subfamilies (Xanthorioideae, Caloplacoideae, and Teloschistoideae) encompass a range of growth forms – crustose, foliose, and fruticose – demonstrating the diverse evolutionary paths within the family. These groups are genetically distinct, each subfamily showing unique patterns in their nuclear large ribosomal subunit RNA sequences.

- Caloplacoideae Arup, Søchting & Frödén (2020)
  - Type genus: Caloplaca. Proposed by Ester Gaya and colleagues in 2012 and validly published in 2020, Caloplacoideae consists mostly of crustose lichens with a wide geographical spread and produces a range of unique chemical compounds.
- Teloschistoideae Arup, Søchting & Frödén (2020)
  - Type genus: Teloschistes. Initially proposed in 2013 and validly published with a full diagnosis in 2020, this subfamily is predominantly found in the Southern Hemisphere.
- Xanthorioideae Arup, Søchting & Frödén (2020)
  - Type genus: Xanthoria. Named by Gaya and colleagues in 2012 and formally validated in 2020, Xanthorioideae species are primarily distributed in the Northern Hemisphere.

The order Teloschistales was first proposed by David Hawksworth and Eriksson in 1986, with a single family (Teloschistaceae); other families were added later. In the 1990s, several authors recognised the Teloschistales as a suborder within the Lecanorales; as a suborder it was named Teloschistineae. Following the appearance of preliminary molecular studies, the Teloschistaceae was classified by some within the order Lecanorales, although others maintained the Teloschistales as a valid order. A large-scale, multigene phylogenetic study of the class Lecanoromycetes published in 2014 corroborated the ordinal status of the Teloschistales, and showed it comprises two clades: Letrouitineae (containing Brigantiaeaceae and Letrouitiaceae) and its sister clade, Teloschistineae (containing Teloschistaceae and Megalosporaceae). The suborder Teloschistineae was formally proposed by Ester Gaya and François Lutzoni in 2016.

=== Molecular phylogenetics ===
Historically, classification of taxa within the family relied on physical characteristics such as growth form, the nature of the outer layer of the lichen (the cortex), and spore type. Studies using modern molecular phylogenetics have shown that phenotypic characteristics (characters) are not always reliable markers of phylogenetic relationships, and classifying species based on these characters has occasionally led to inaccurate interpretations of their evolutionary history. Advanced DNA analysis techniques have allowed scientists to identify and differentiate cryptic species, which, though visually indistinguishable, are genetically distinct. This approach has unveiled distinct species within previously thought homogeneous groups, like the genus Caloplaca, by uncovering their unique genetic markers.

Although Teloschistaceae is now well represented in GenBank, with thousands of DNA sequences, the early molecular studies were limited by having too few examples of each species to draw definitive conclusions. With the increasing availability of genetic sequences, researchers began to gain a better understanding of the family's phylogeny.

One significant finding from molecular data is that the traditional morphological methods had mistakenly grouped different species together. For example, the genus Caloplaca was once thought to be descended from a single lineage (i.e. monophyletic), but is now understood to have been composed of multiple, unrelated groups (polyphyletic). This insight has prompted numerous proposals to redefine the genus into smaller, monophyletic groups; but such taxonomic changes have sometimes met with resistance due to the vast number of species reclassifications they would entail.

According to the lichenologist Robert Lücking, families like Teloschistaceae, which have undergone several changes in genus classification through various studies, require phylogenetic consolidation through extensive multi-locus analysis, incorporating all available data and employing rigorous analytical methods. This strategy, akin to approaches taken with families such as Collemataceae, Graphidaceae, Pannariaceae, and Parmeliaceae, is essential for accurately revising the taxonomic classification of this diverse and widespread group of lichens.

Molecular evidence has also helped to map the family's relationships within the class Lecanoromycetes. A 2018 study identified the Megalosporaceae as the Teloschistaceae's closest relative.

== Description ==
In general, Teloschistaceae members are known for their vibrant colours, spanning a spectrum of yellow, orange, and red hues, attributed to anthraquinone pigments. This group of lichens has a broad range of physical forms – from thin, encrusting (crustose) to leaf-like (foliose) or even bushy (fruticose) formations. Although it is an atypical growth form for the Teloschistaceae, members of genus Ioplaca are somewhat umbilicate, meaning they have a somewhat circular, leafy thallus attached to the substrate at a single point.

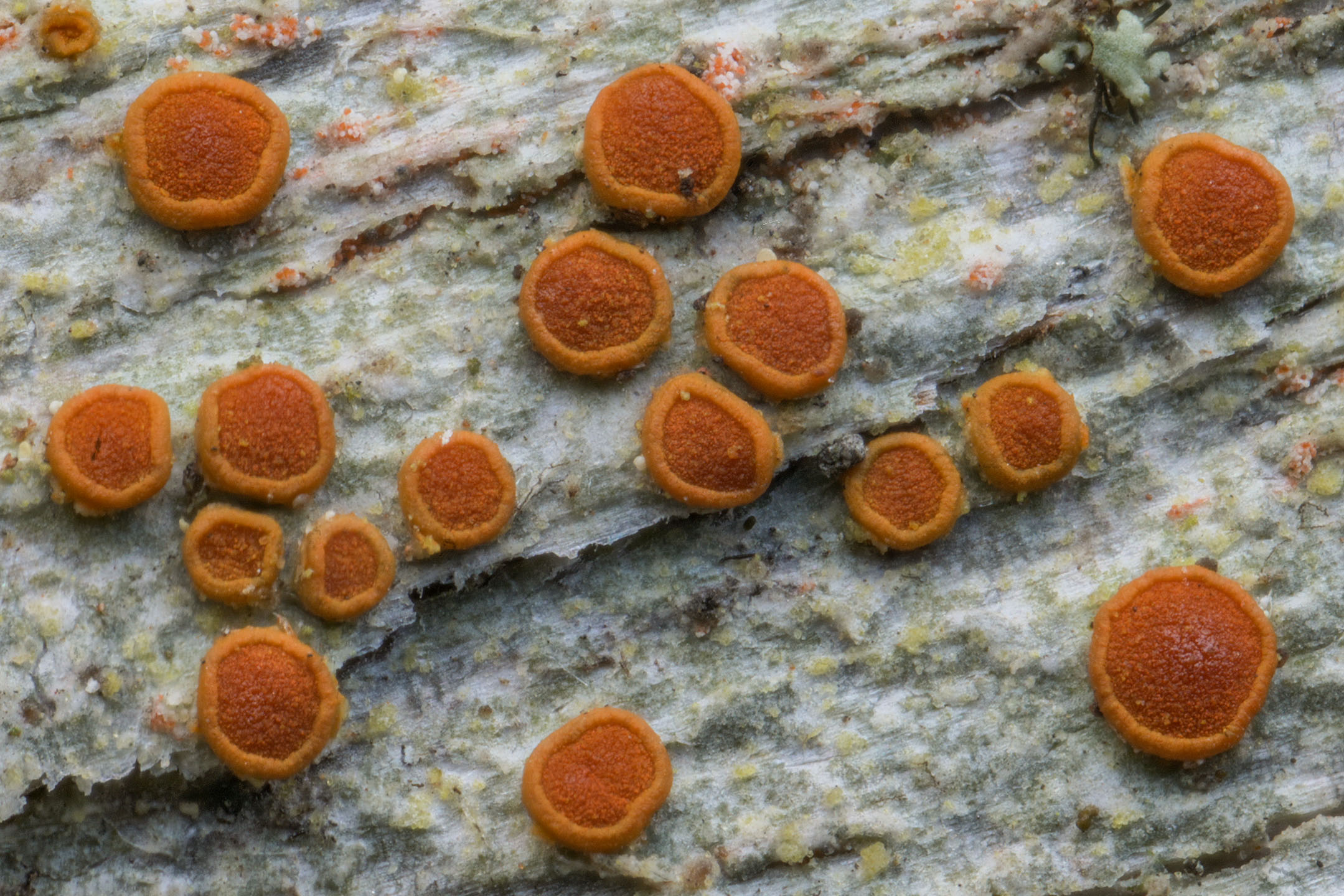
In contrast to its barely visible thallus, the apothecia of Athallia holocarpa are prominent. Like most Teloschistaceae, these apothecia are lecanorine in form: rounded with thick, pale, thalline margins.

Teloschistaceae lichens have a symbiotic relationship with a photobiont, generally a member of the green algal genus Trebouxia. The lichen's reproductive structures, or ascomata, are usually brightly coloured, and typically in the form of an apothecium – a wide, open, saucer-shaped or cup-shaped fruit body. In most species, these apotheciate ascomata have a lecanorine form, in which the apothecial disc is surrounded by a pale rim of tissue known as a thalline margin. Fewer Teloschistaceae species have biatorine or lecideine forms, in which the apothecial disc lacks a thalline margin. Reproductive propagules, such as isidia and soredia, can be found in select species.

The presence and distribution of crystalline deposits serve as important diagnostic features in Teloschistaceae taxonomy. While members of this family commonly produce orange anthraquinone crystals that are soluble in potassium hydroxide, some species also accumulate distinct calcium oxalate crystals, particularly in their medulla. These oxalate crystals are especially prevalent in genera such as Wetmoreana, where they can form either as a distinct layer between the algal and medullary layers or throughout the entire medulla. The pattern and abundance of these crystals can help distinguish between similar species. For example, consistent differences in crystal distribution help separate Wetmoreana ochraceofulva from W. brouardii, and Variospora flavescens from V. aurantia. In some species, such as Wetmoreana texana, the abundance of medullary crystals varies with environmental conditions, being more prevalent in specimens exposed to strong sunlight. While surface crystals (pruina) may be influenced by environmental factors, the presence of internal crystalline deposits often represents a stable taxonomic characteristic.

The ascomata encase asci, cylindrical formations that commonly contain between four and sixteen ascospores, with eight being the most prevalent count. These asci are characterised by a well-developed J+ layer amyloid cap; the term "J+" refers to the positive staining reaction of the ascus tip to iodine, specifically when it turns blue or dark blue in the presence of iodine-based solutions like Melzer's reagent or Lugol's iodine. The internal apical structure of the ascus is rudimentary, relative to the more complex apical structures in other related families.

Teloschistaceae ascospores, typically translucent, usually have one to three septa (internal partitions) with a prominent central septum connected by a canal to the spores' internal cavities, or lumina. Although the presence of a two-chambered (polarilocular) structure in these ascospores is generally indicative of the Teloschistaceae, the spores lack other distinctive features that could be useful as defining taxonomic characteristics. Historically, polarilocular ascospores were regarded as a hallmark of the Teloschistaceae. The incorporation of genera such as Apatoplaca, Cephalophysis, Fulgensia, and Xanthopeltis, which have either non-septate or simply septate spores, has necessitated a reassessment of what fundamentally characterises this group.

A distinctive feature of Teloschistaceae is the presence of the gelatinous paraphyses (filament-like support structures in the reproductive apparatus), with either unbranched or slightly branched structures culminating in bulbous ends. Within this family, asexual reproduction leads to the creation of pycnidia-type conidiomata (i.e., small, flask-shaped fruiting bodies), producing translucent asexual spores (conidia) that are either bacillar (rod-shaped) or bifusiform (double-spindle shaped). The tissue composition of the thallus and apothecia is characterised by a loosely paraplectenchymatous structure, meaning the constituent fungal hyphae are oriented in different directions.

Morphological variety of Teloschistaceae
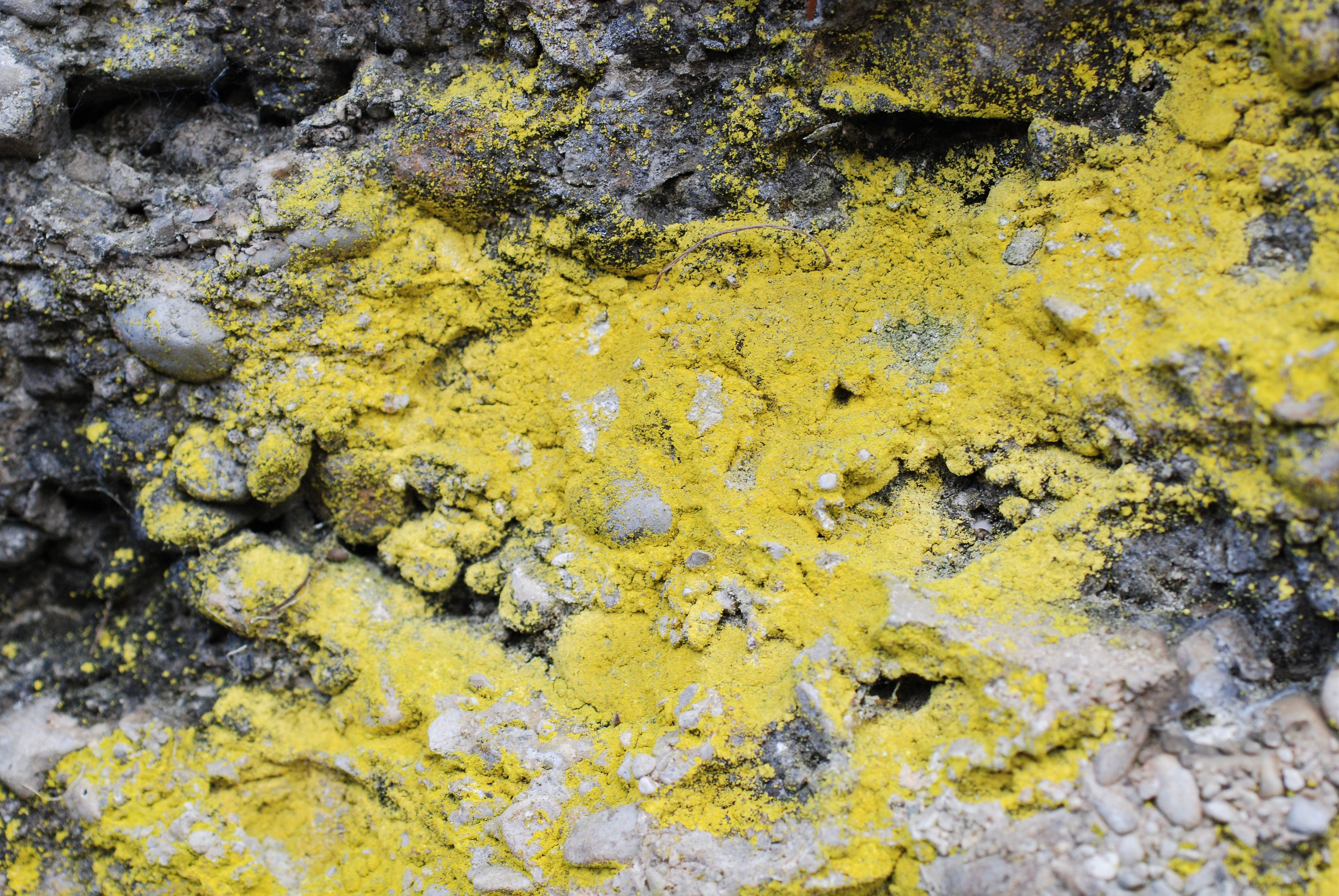
crustose, leprose: Leproplaca chrysodeta

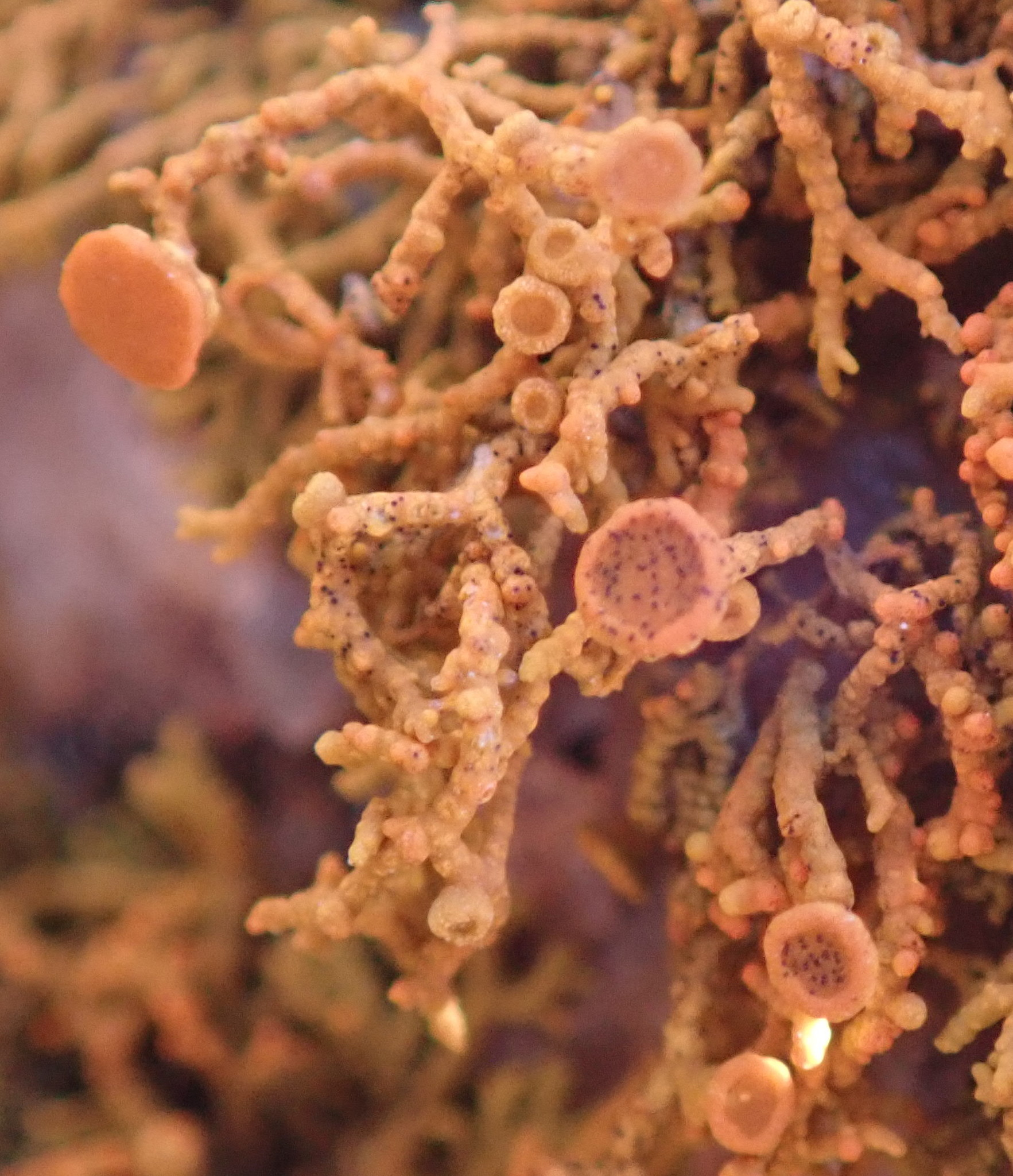
fruticulose: Polycauliona coralloides

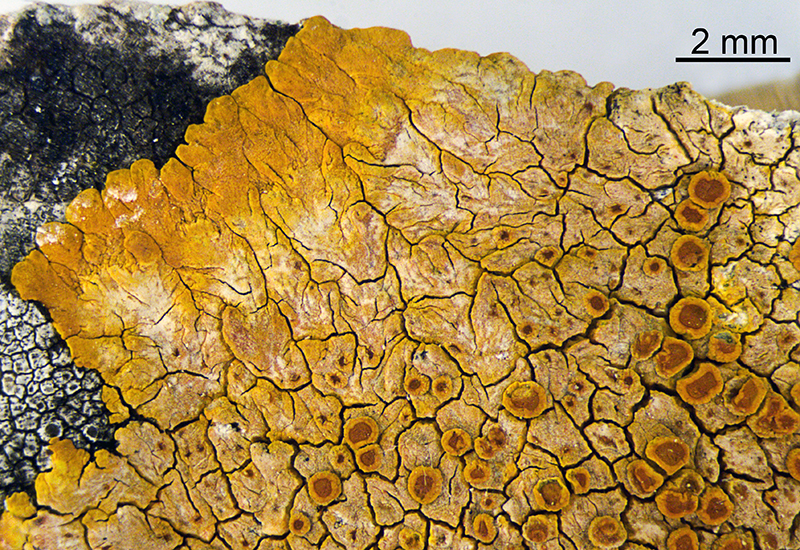
crustose, placodioid: Variospora aurantia

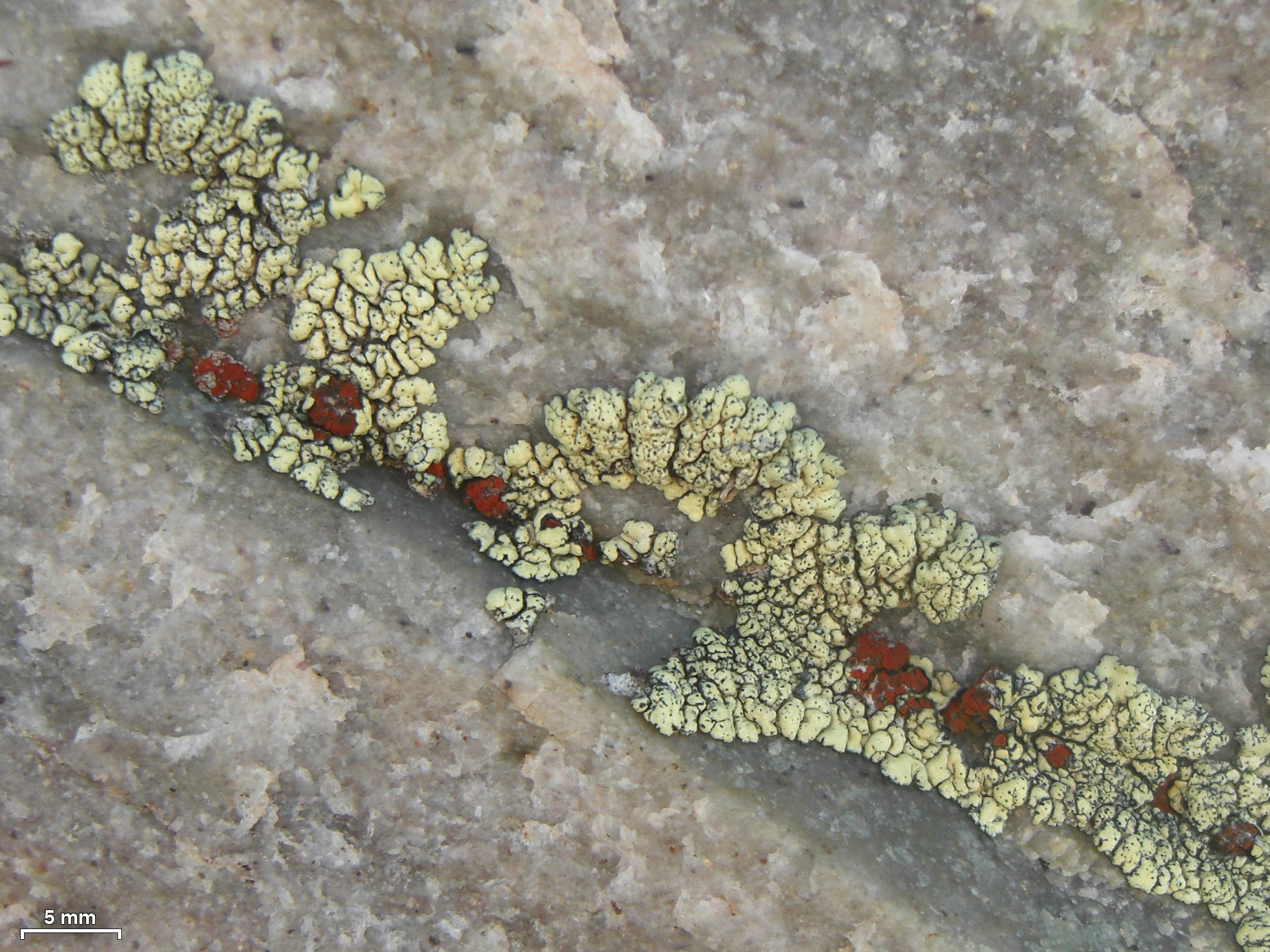
lichenicolous lichen Erichansenia epithallina (red) growing on the crustose Rhizoplaca novomexicana

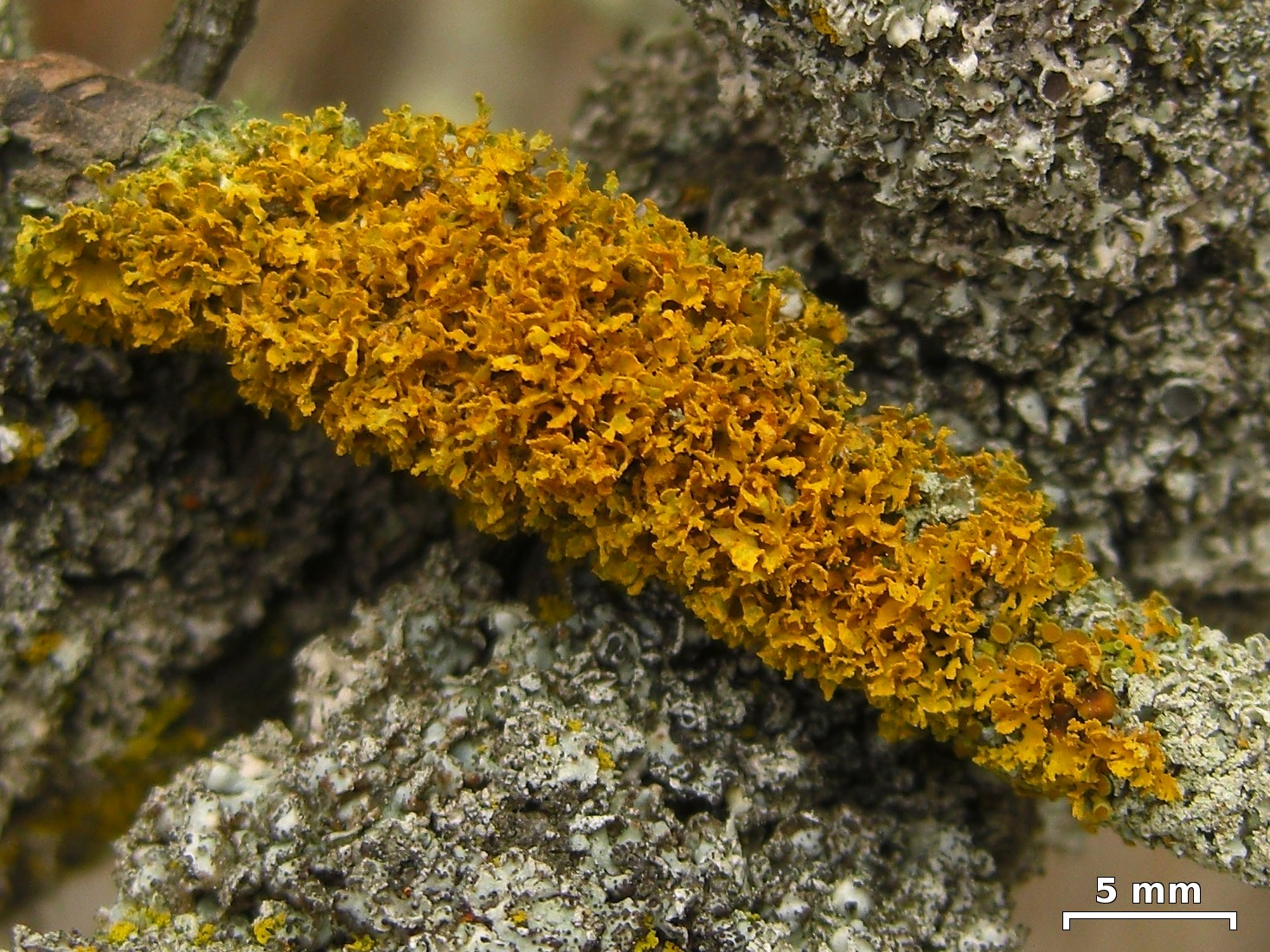
foliose: Xanthomendoza oregana

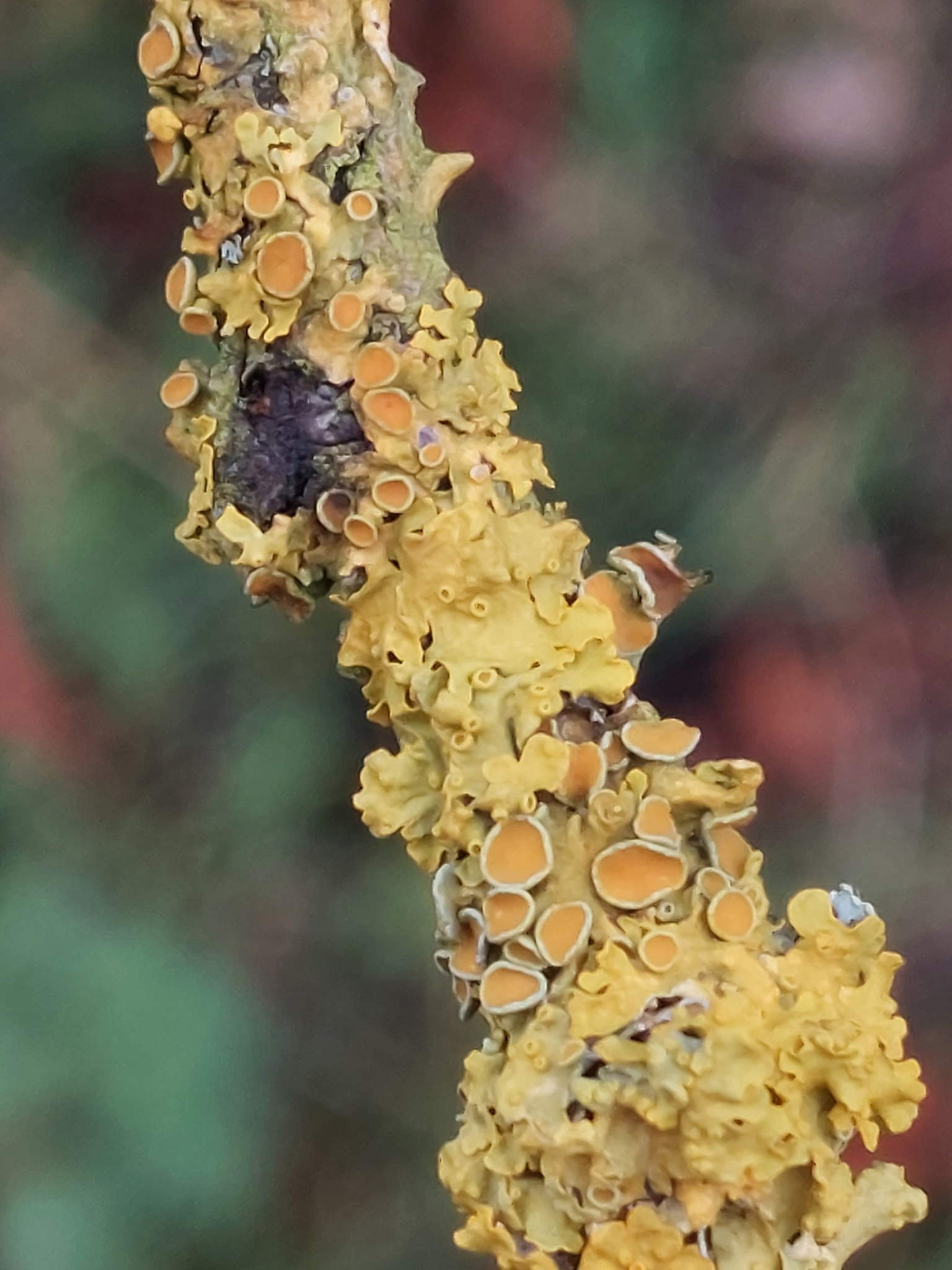
foliose: Xanthoria parietina

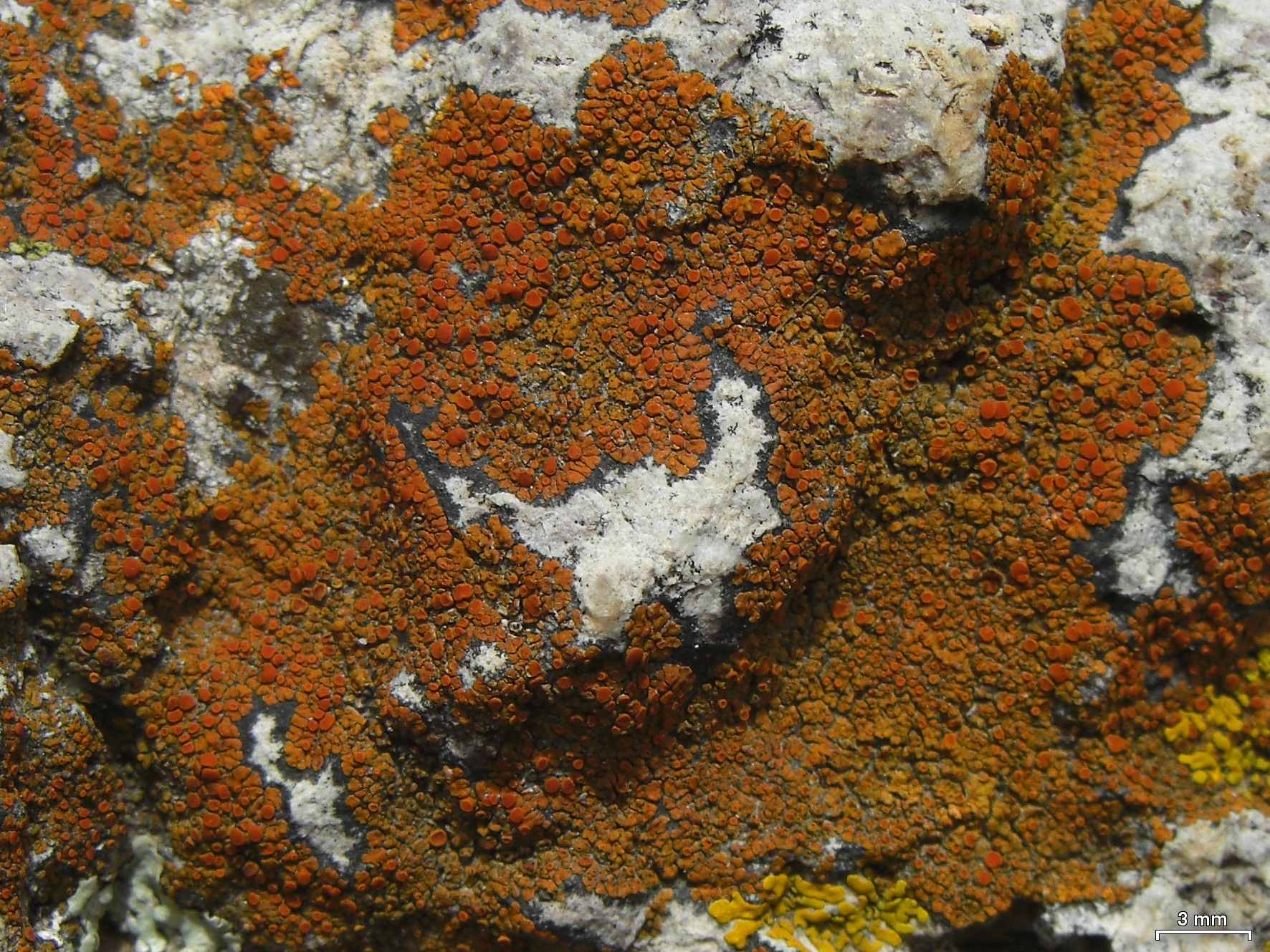
squamulose: Squamulea squamosa

== Photobionts ==
In lichens, photobionts are the photosynthetic organisms that collaborate with fungal partners to enable the unique lichen symbiosis. Members of the Teloschistaceae associate with trebouxioid green algal photobionts (i.e. resembling or belonging to the green algal genus Trebouxia). An early study investigating the ultrastructure of the interaction between the fungus and alga in several Teloschistaceae species showed that, in most cases, the cells were merely in close proximity to one another, with only a few instances of fungal cells invading the algal cells. The widespread Xanthoria parietina species complex has been identified to associate with various trebouxioid species, including Asterochloris italiana, Trebouxia arboricola, and T. decolorans. Within the order Teloschistales, unlike the Teloschistaceae, species in the families Letrouitiaceae and Megalosporaceae primarily partner with the green algal genus Dictyochloropsis. Due to their resilience to desiccation, Trebouxia species serve as the main photobionts for lichen-forming fungi found in extreme environments such as the Antarctic, Arctic, alpine regions, and deserts, where lichens face continual exposure to intense dryness and temperature shifts.

Studies of photobionts in the Teloschistaceae, including foliose genera (Xanthoria, Xanthomendoza) and a fruticose genus (Teloschistes), demonstrate a consistent association with specific Trebouxia clades. This finding suggests a genus-level specificity, with only select Trebouxia subclades forming symbiotic relationships. This specificity is not absolute and may vary with habitat: lichens in extreme climates have been observed to associate with a broader range of photobionts.

== Chemistry ==
Parietin (top) and the structurally similar emodin (bottom) are anthraquinone pigments common in the Teloschistaceae.

The predominant chemical compounds found in the Teloschistaceae are pigments known as anthraquinones. These substances, which are deposited in the upper cortical layer of the lichen, have photoprotective properties, as they can absorb ultraviolet (UV) and blue light. The development of secondary metabolites, particularly anthraquinones, has been essential in the evolutionary adaptation of the family to diverse environments, enabling their transition from shaded, plant-based habitats to sun-exposed, arid regions and contributing significantly to the success of the familial lineage. A 2023 study used comparative genomics to identify a metabolic gene cluster involved in anthraquinone metabolism and shared uniquely across the Teloschistales. Phylogenetic analyses of fungal polyketide synthases (PKSs) reveal a consistent grouping of genes, hinting at a shared ancestral trait for anthraquinone biosynthesis within the subphylum Pezizomycotina. Although the genetic machinery (like the PKSs) involved in anthraquinone biosynthesis in Teloschistales and some non-lichenised fungi is conserved and shows similarities, the specific arrangement of the involved enzymes seems to be a distinguishing feature in the Teloschistales' approach to anthraquinone biosynthesis. The identification of an ABC transporter gene in the pigment gene cluster suggests a mechanism for how lichens accumulate substantial amounts of potentially toxic anthraquinone crystals in their thallus and reproductive structures.

Between 1897 and 1906, the mycologist Friedrich Wilhelm Zopf and the chemist Oswald Hesse conducted a series of early chemical studies on members of the Teloschistaceae, leading to the extraction of the reddish pigment parietin from selected species. Parietin is an antioxidant molecule that is produced in greater amounts in lichen thalli that are exposed to excess nitrogen. In a 1970 publication, Johan Santesson surveyed 230 Caloplaca species for anthraquinones as part of a phytochemical study of the Teloschistaceae, and concluded that the studied species could be arranged according to their anthraquinone content in thirteen chemical groups. In 1997, Ulrik Søchting analysed secondary metabolites from species of Caloplaca, Teloschistes, and Xanthoria to look for chemical patterns of consistent combinations and proportions of lichen products. He identified two chemosyndromes (characteristic sets of chemical compounds) with parietin, emodin, fallacinol, fallacinal, and parietinic acid as the main substances. Parietin acts as a UV-light filter to provide optimal light intensities for the photobionts that are resident in the internal algal layer. Studies show that in Xanthoria parietina, the more light the lichen is exposed to, the higher the concentration of parietin. In the Teloschistaceae, parietin may also serve a defensive role. In the Negev desert, the parietin-containing Teloschistaceae species Elenkiniana ehrenbergii and Seirophora lacunosa are avoided by grazing snails, but they frequently consume lichens like Diploicia canescens and Buellia subalbula (both in family Caliciaceae), which lack parietin.

In their large-scale phylogenetic analysis of the Teloschistaceae, the lichenologists Ulf Arup, Ulrik Søchting, and Patrik Frödén analysed about 4000 specimens of members of the family using high-performance liquid chromatography, and identified more than 100 secondary metabolites, mostly anthraquinones. They noted that in the large majority of cases, the distribution of lichen products was more or less constant within species. In some instances, the secondary chemistry is important at higher taxonomic levels (i.e., ranks higher than species). For example, the genus Catenaria is characterised by the presence of 7-chlorocatenarin, a secondary metabolite previously unknown in lichens. The substance usnic acid characterises the genus Usnochroma, and 5-chloroemodin occurs in all but one species of Shackletonia. The secondary chemistry of the Caloplacoideae is the most diverse amongst the three Teloschistaceae subfamilies, as it contains both chlorinated anthraquinones and depsidones.

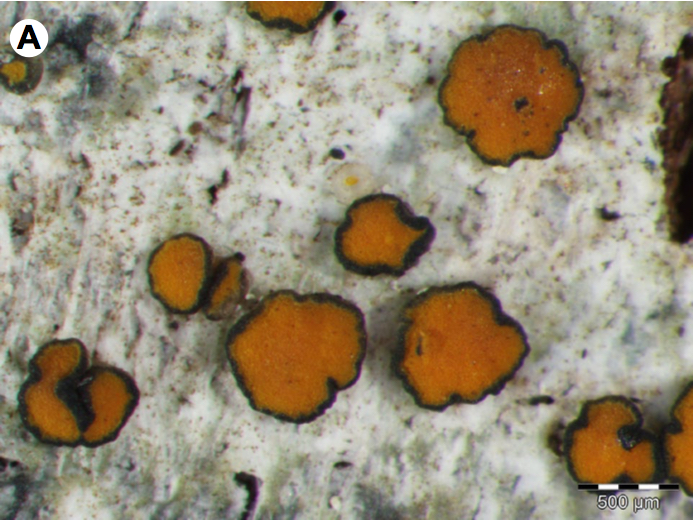
Apothecia of Ikaeria serusiauxii grown in full light develop completely black margins resulting from the accumulation of the pigment Cinereorufa-green.

Although most Teloschistaceae lichens produce anthraquinone pigments in shades ranging from yellow to orange to red, the genera Apatoplaca and Cephalophysis lack these anthraquinones. Similarly, the genus Pyrenodesmia encompasses species where anthraquinones are absent and replaced by substances such as Cinereorufa-green or Sedifolia-grey; these insoluble lichen pigments may confer UV-protective ability similar to anthraquinones. Taxa of the closely related genera Kuettlingeria and Sanguineodiscus have anthraquinones in their apothecia and Sedifolia-grey in their thalli. The species Kuettlingeria neotaurica features apothecia of two colour variants: orange-red (with anthraquinones) and grey (with Sedifolia-grey). The absence of anthraquinones is not a synapomorphic character, but appears independently in unrelated lineages of Teloschistaceae; as such, it is a phylogenetically unreliable character.

== Adaptive radiation ==
Adaptive radiation in the Teloschistaceae has been studied to understand the key phenotypic changes leading to their diversification. This diversification is believed to be connected to the spread of anthraquinone pigments in their thallus. Initially, these pigments were thought to have appeared during the Teloschistaceae's first divergence, with a more widespread occurrence developing later. The distribution of anthraquinones in Teloschistaceae lichens varies, from being dispersed across the organism's surface to localised regions. Analysis suggests that the family's lineage witnessed a loss and subsequent return of these pigments over time, considering their presence in the thallus and apothecia as the ancestral state. Ecologically, these organisms transitioned from inhabiting shaded bark environments to colonising sunlit, rocky areas during their diversification.

The analysis of phenotypic traits and diversification rates shows that anthraquinones in the thallus and greater sun exposure have contributed to an acceleration of diversification. On the contrary, living in shaded environments or having a crustose-continuous (smooth, non-scaly) growth form hindered diversification. The choice of substrate, be it rock or bark, did not have a pronounced impact on diversification rates. This adaptive radiation within the Teloschistaceae is estimated to have initiated around 100 million years ago, specifically during the Late Cretaceous period. Factors like climatic shifts, continental separations, and the emergence of flowering plants are theorised to have influenced the adaptive landscape. Such factors might have promoted the development of light-protective anthraquinones, enabling Teloschistaceae to colonise exposed environments. The diversification of anthraquinone genes in their evolution is primarily due to gene reshuffling, which has given rise to novel biosynthetic enzyme pathways and gene clusters.

== Genera ==
The classification and number of species within the Teloschistaceae have evolved significantly over time. Historical estimates have varied, with 10 genera and 47 species recognised in 2001, increasing to 12 genera and 644 species by 2008. The new classification proposed by Arup and colleagues in their 2013 taxonomy article recognised 39 genera, including 31 that were newly described or resurrected. By 2016, there were between 51 and 53 genera and about 700 species; 65 genera and 755 species in 2017; and 71 genera and about 840 species by 2022. In the same year, Kondratyuk and colleagues enumerated all members of the Teloschistaceae with publicly available DNA sequences, and confirmed 590 species across 115 genera. As of October 2025, Species Fungorum (in the Catalogue of Life), accepts 127 genera and 1018 species in the Teloschistaceae. The largest genus is Caloplaca, at 330 accepted species.

In terms of species diversity, Teloschistaceae stood as the sixth-largest lichen-forming fungal family by 2017, following Parmeliaceae, Graphidaceae, Verrucariaceae, Ramalinaceae, and Lecanoraceae. Each genus is paired with its taxonomic authority, denoting the first describers using standardised author abbreviations, the publication year, and the number of species. Genera are organised by subfamily:

=== Caloplacoideae ===
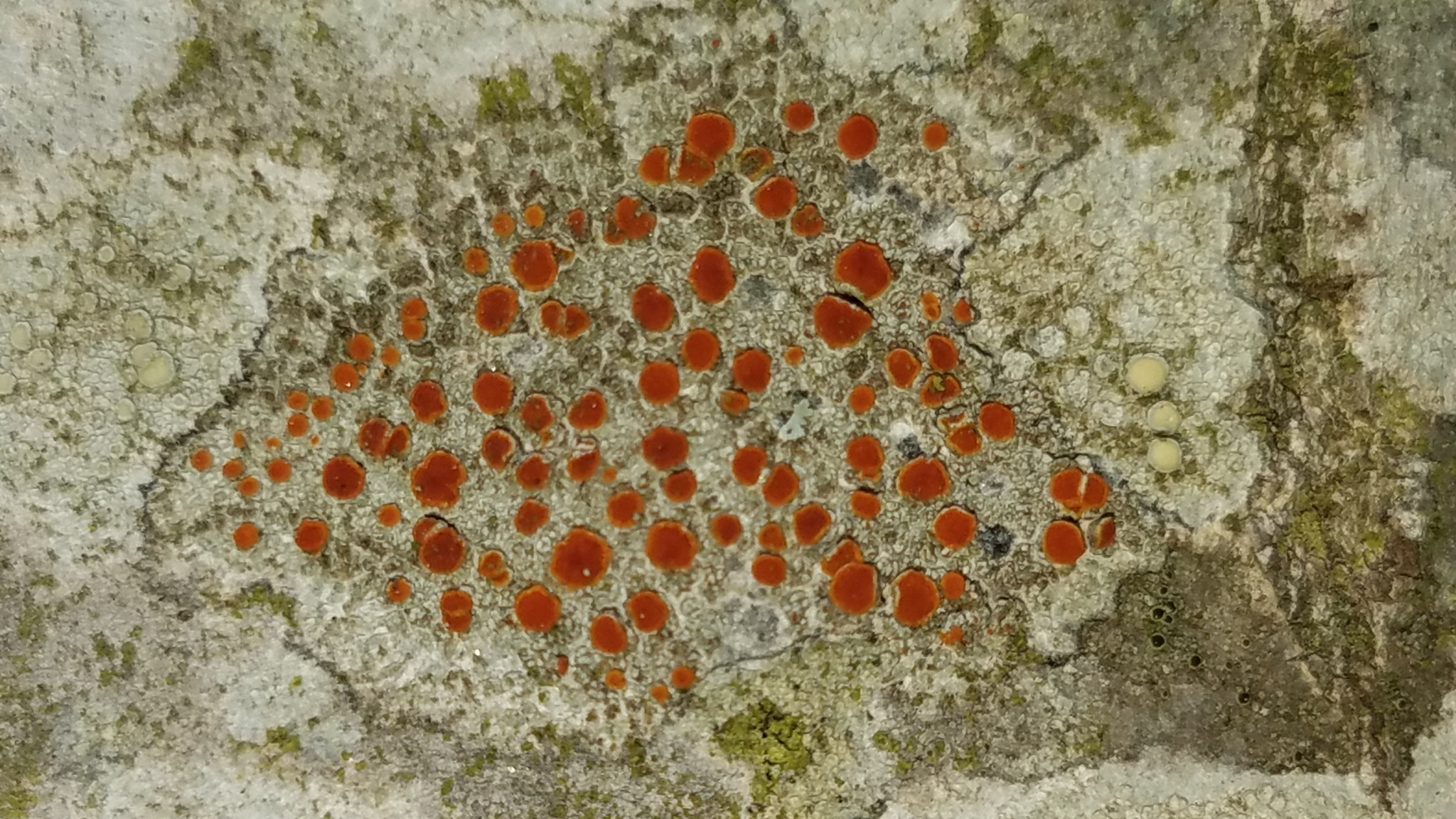
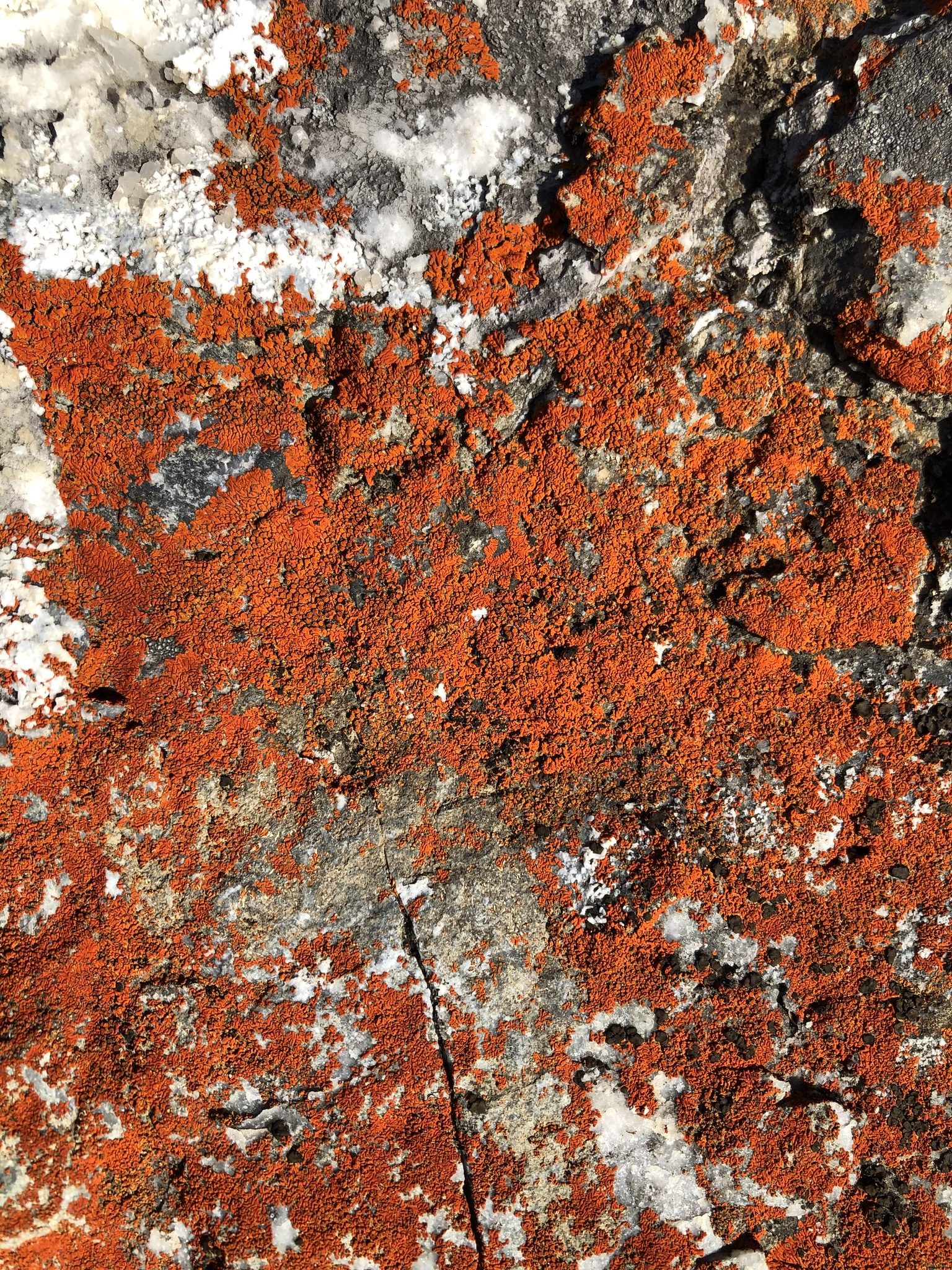
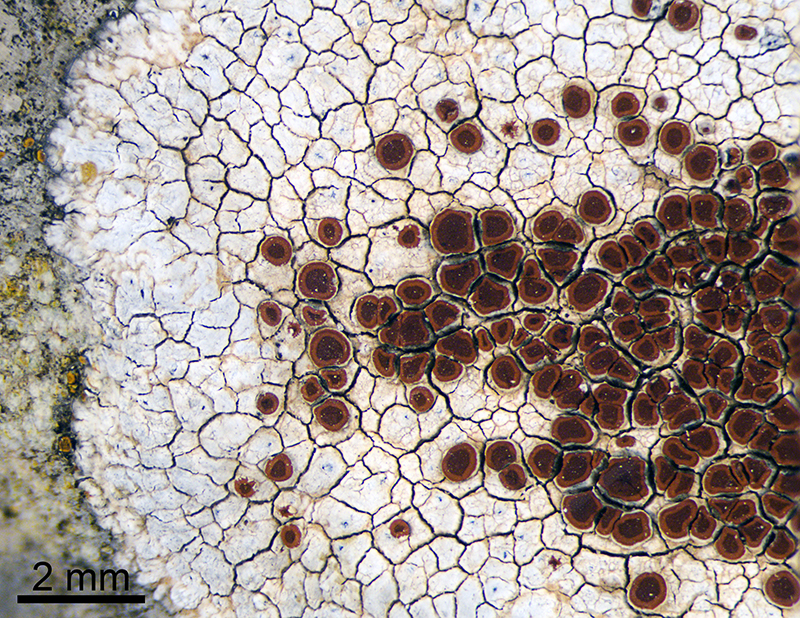
Examples from subfamily Caloplacoideae (clockwise from upper left): Blastenia ferruginea; Igneoplaca ignea; and Kuettlingeria erythrocarpa
- Apatoplaca Poelt & Hafellner (1980) – 1 sp.
- Blastenia A.Massal. (1852) – 11 spp.
- Bryoplaca Søchting, Frödén & Arup (2013) – 3 spp.
- Caloplaca Th.Fr. (1860) – 351 spp.
- Cephalophysis (Hertel) H.Kilias (1985) – 1 sp.
- Eilifdahlia S.Y.Kondr., Kärnefelt, Elix, A.Thell & Hur (2014) – 2 spp.
- Elenkiniana S.Y.Kondr., Kärnefelt, Elix, A.Thell & Hur (2014) – 3 spp. (Note: Kondratyuk and colleagues suggested that Gyalolechia was polyphyletic, and split it into Elenkiniana, Gyalolechia, and Mikhtomia; Wilk and colleagues maintain Arup et al.'s 2013 classification pending further research.)
- Fauriea S.Y.Kondr., Lőkös & Hur (2016) – 7 spp.
- Franwilsia S.Y.Kondr., Kärnefelt, Elix, A.Thell & Hur (2014) – 3 spp.
- Fulgensia A.Massal. & De Not. (1853) – 1 sp.
- Gintarasiella S.Y.Kondr. & Hur (2017) – 1 sp.
- Gyalolechia A.Massal. (1852) – 40 spp.
- Hanstrassia S.Y.Kondr. (2017) – 2 spp.
- Hueidea Kantvilas & P.M.McCarthy (2003) – 6 spp.
- Huneckia S.Y.Kondr., Elix, Kärnefelt, A.Thell & Hur (2014) – 4 spp.
- Ioplaca Poelt (1977) – 2 spp.
- Jasonhuria S.Y.Kondr., Lőkös & S.O.Oh (2015) – 1 sp.
- Klauderuiella S.Y.Kondr. & Hur (2017) – 3 spp. (Note: Kondratyuk and colleagues suggested that Variospora was polyphyletic, and split it into Klauderuiella and Variospora; Wilk and colleagues maintain Arup et al.'s 2013 classification pending further research.)
- Kuettlingeria Trevis. (1857) – 15 spp.
- Lacrima Bungartz, Arup & Søchting (2020) – 4 spp.
- Laundonia S.Y.Kondr., Lőkös & Hur (2017) – 2 spp.
- Lendemeriella S.Y.Kondr. (2020) – 9 spp.
- Leproplaca (Nyl.) Nyl. (1888) – 7 spp.
- Loekoesia S.Y.Kondr., S.O.Oh & Hur (2015) – 3 spp.
- Marchantiana S.Y.Kondr., Kärnefelt, Elix, A.Thell & Hur (2014) – 7 spp.
- Mikhtomia S.Y.Kondr., Kärnefelt, Elix, A.Thell & Hur (2014) – 4 spp.
- Neoplaca I.V.Frolov, Prokopiev & Konoreva (2023) – 1 sp.
- Obscuroplaca Søchting, Arup & Bungartz (2021) – 3 spp.
- Oceanoplaca Arup, Søchting & Bungartz (2020) – 6 spp. (Note: Kondratyuk and colleagues suggest that Oceanoplaca is a synonym of Loekoeslaszloa.)
- Olegblumia S.Y.Kondr., Lőkös & Hur (2020) – 1 sp.
- Opeltia S.Y.Kondr. & Lőkös (2017) – 4 spp.
- Oxneriopsis S.Y.Kondr., Upreti & Hur (2017) – 4 spp.
- Pisutiella S.Y.Kondr., Lőkös & Farkas (2020) – 6 spp.
- Pyrenodesmia A.Massal. (1852) – 6 spp.
- Rufoplaca Arup, Søchting & Frödén (2013) – 10 spp.
- Sanguineodiscus I.V.Frolov & Vondrák (2020) – 4 spp.
- Seirophora Poelt (1983) – 8 spp.
- Sucioplaca Bungartz, Søchting & Arup (2020) – 1 sp.
- Taedigera Søchting & Arup (2024) – 6 spp.
- Upretia S.Y.Kondr., A.Thell & Hur (2017) – 2 spp.
- Usnochroma Søchting, Arup & Frödén (2013) – 2 spp.
- Variospora Arup, Søchting & Frödén (2013) – 16 spp.
- Xanthaptychia S.Y.Kondr. & Ravera (2017) – 3 spp.
- Yoshimuria S.Y.Kondr., Kärnefelt, Elix, A.Thell & Hur (2014) – 4 spp.

=== Teloschistoideae ===
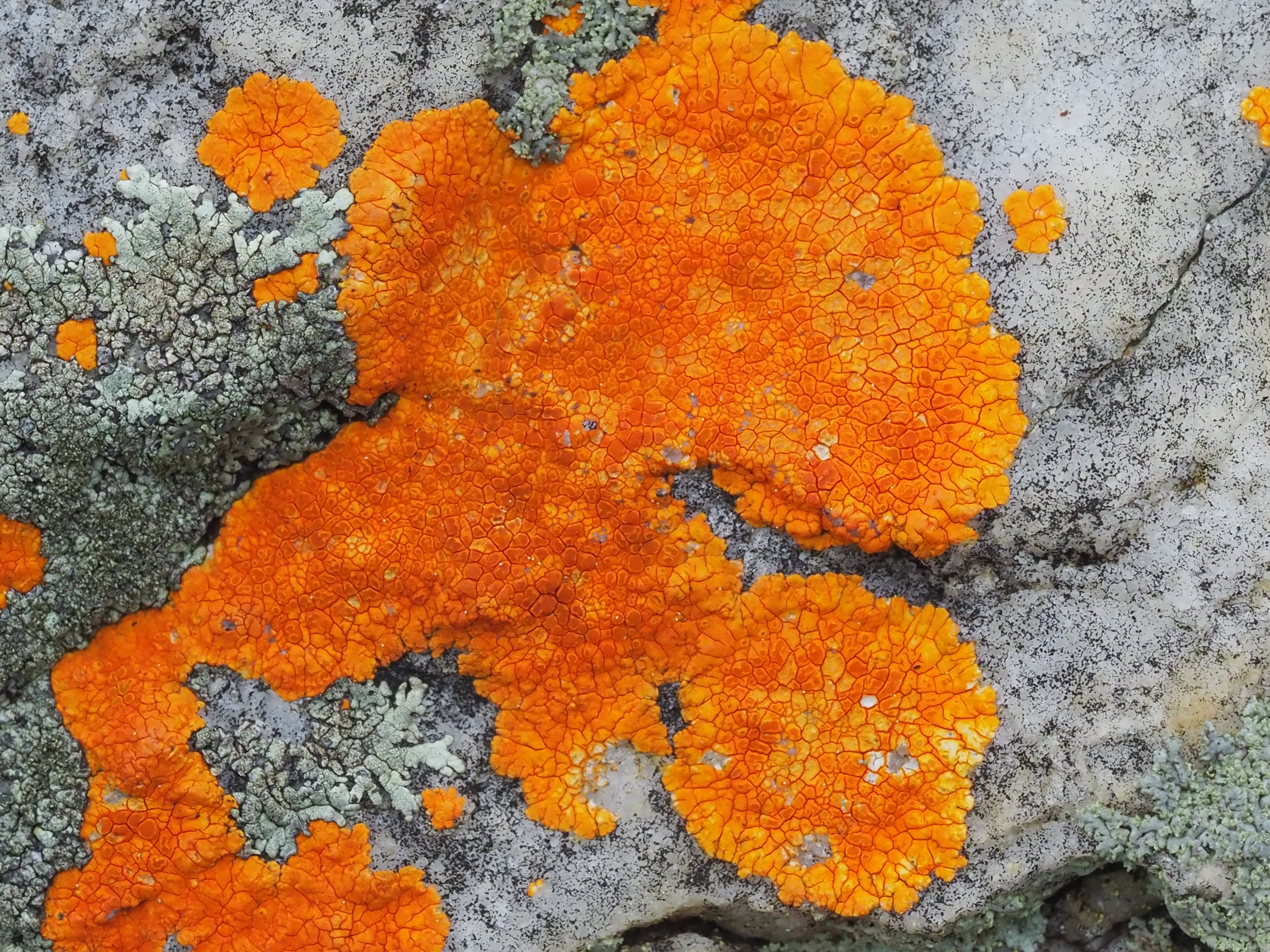
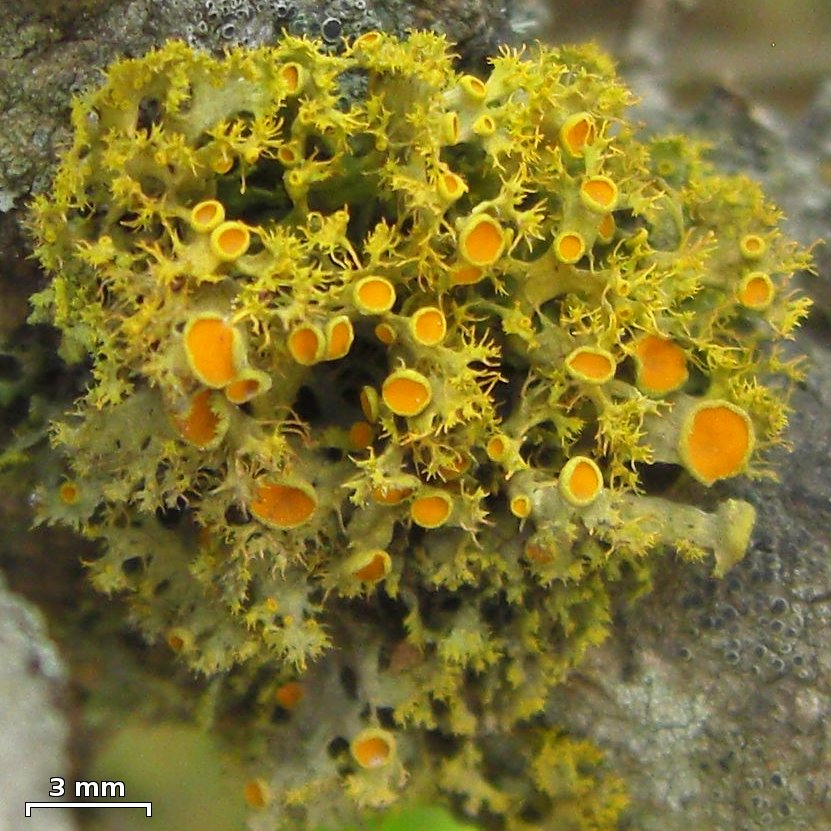
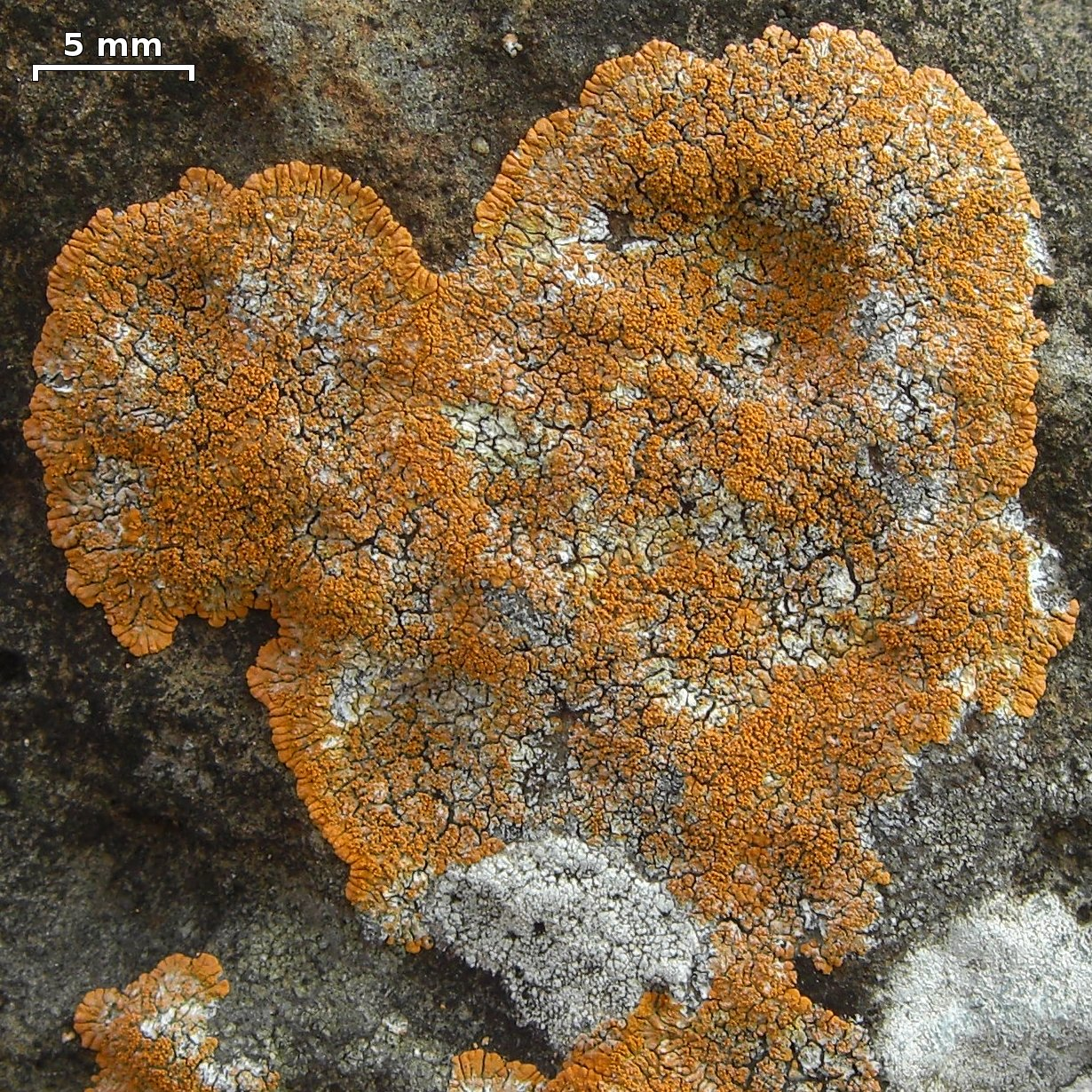
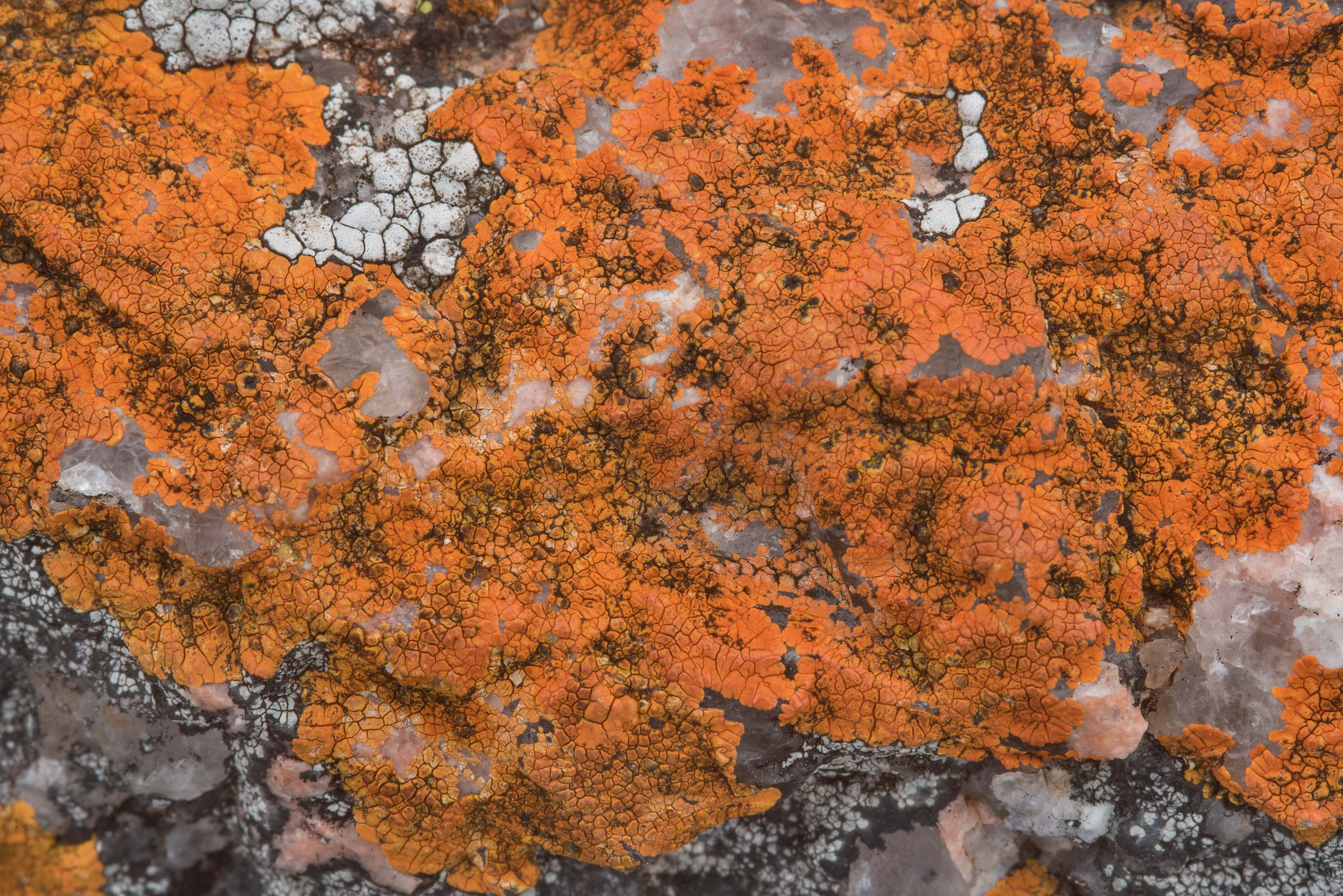
Examples from subfamily Teloschistoideae (clockwise from upper left): Neobrownliella cinnabarina; Niorma hosseusiana; Wetmoreana brouardii; and Wetmoreana appressa
- Aridoplaca Wilk, Pabijan & Lücking (2021) – 1 sp.
- Brownliella S.Y.Kondr., Kärnefelt, Elix, A.Thell & Hur (2013) – 2 spp.
- Catenarina Søchting, Søgaard, Arup, Elvebakk & Elix (2014) – 3 spp.
- Cinnabaria Wilk, Pabijan & Lücking (2021) – 1 sp.
- Elixjohnia S.Y.Kondr. & Hur (2017) – 4 spp.
- Filsoniana S.Y.Kondr., Kärnefelt, Elix, A.Thell & Hur (2013) – 9 spp.
- Follmannia C.W.Dodge (1967) – 2 spp.
- Haloplaca Arup, Søchting & Frödén (2013) – 3 spp.
- Harusavskia S.Y.Kondr. (2017) – 1 sp.
- Hosseusiella S.Y.Kondr., L.Lőkös, Kärnefelt & A.Thell (2018) – 3 spp.
- Ikaeria S.Y.Kondr., D.Upreti & Hur (2017) – 2 spp.
- Iqbalia Fayyaz, Afshan & S.Y.Kondr. (2022) – 1 sp.
- Josefpoeltia S.Y.Kondr. & Kärnefelt (1997) – 3 spp.
- Kaernefia S.Y.Kondr., Elix, A.Thell & Hur (2013) – 3 spp.
- Lazarenkoiopsis S.Y.Kondr., Lőkös & Hur (2017) – 1 sp.
- Loekoeslaszloa S.Y.Kondr., Kärnefelt, A.Thell & Hur (2019) – 2 spp.
- Neobrownliella S.Y.Kondr., Elix, Kärnefelt & A.Thell (2015) – 5 spp.
- Nevilleiella S.Y.Kondr. & Hur (2017) – 2 spp.
- Niorma A.Massal. (1861) – 5 spp. (Note: Niorma was proposed by Kondratyuk et al. in 2013 for the species group centred around Teloschistes hypoglaucus; Wilk and colleagues instead use the more inclusive Teloschistes as per Arup et al. (2013) pending further studies.)
- Rehmanniella S.Y.Kondr. & Hur (2018) – 5 spp.
- Scutaria Søchting, Arup & Frödén (2013) – 1 sp.
- Sirenophila Søchting, Arup & Frödén (2013) – 4 spp.
- Stellarangia Frödén, Arup & Søchting (2013) – 3 spp.
- Streimanniella S.Y.Kondr., Kärnefelt, A.Thell, Elix & Hur (2015) – 4 spp.
- Tassiloa S.Y.Kondr., Kärnefelt, A.Thell, Elix & Hur (2015) – 2 spp.
- Tayloriellina S.Y.Kondr., Kärnefelt, A.Thell, Elix & Hur (2016) – 2 spp. (Note: Wilk and colleagues proposed to reduce Tayloriellina to synonymy with Villophora.)
- Teloschistes Norman (1852) – ca. 24 spp.
- Teloschistopsis Frödén, Søchting & Arup (2013) – 3 spp.
- Thelliana S.Y.Kondr., Kärnefelt, Elix & Hur (2015) – 1 sp. (Note: Wilk and colleagues suggest that Thelliana is a putative synonym of Filsoniana.)
- Villophora Søchting, Arup & Frödén (2013) – 9 spp.
- Weia H.Shahidin & X.L.Wei (2025) – 1 sp.
- Wetmoreana Arup, Søchting & Frödén (2013) – 2 spp.
- Wilketalia S.Y.Kondr (2021) – 1 sp.

=== Xanthorioideae ===
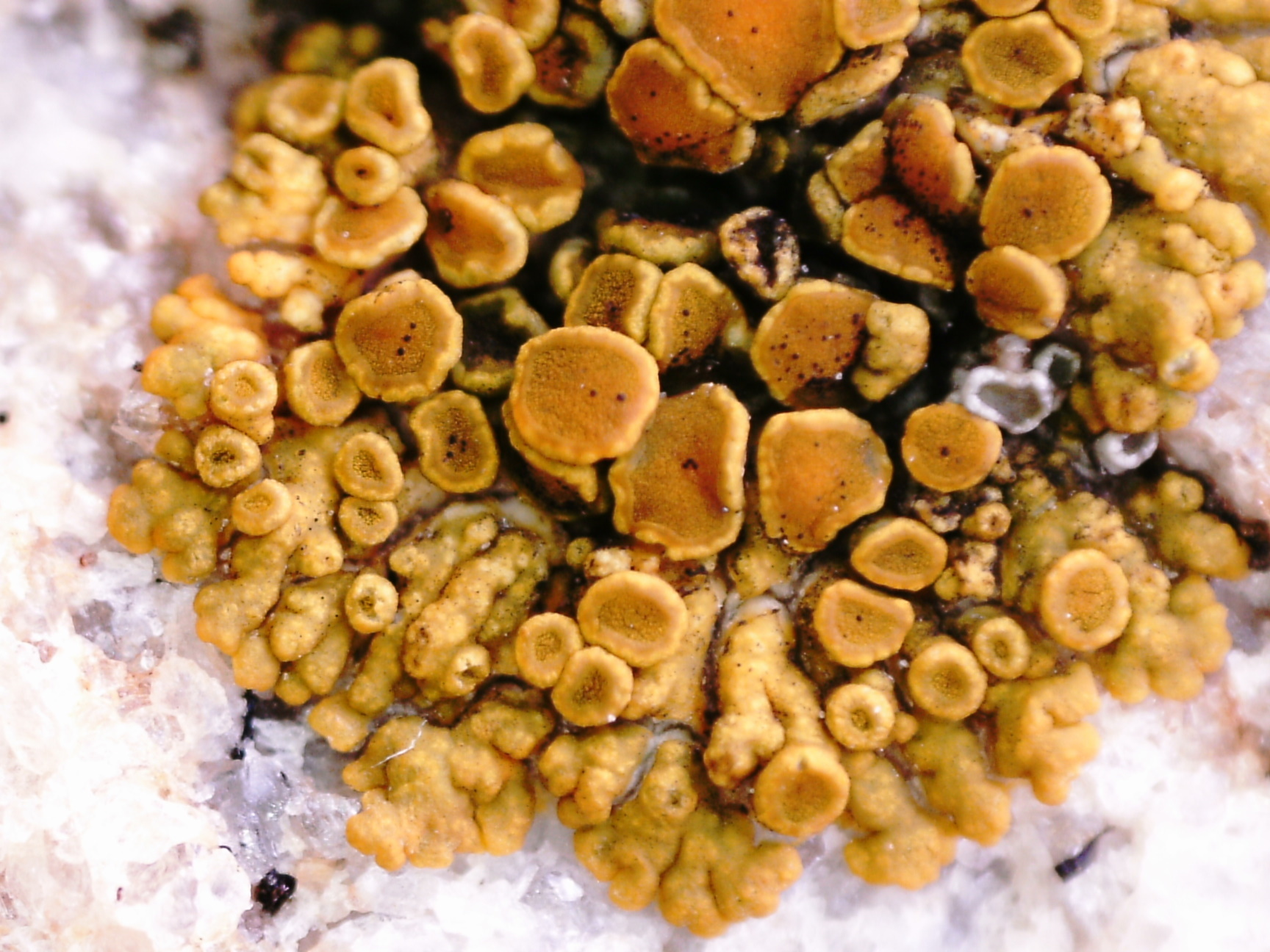
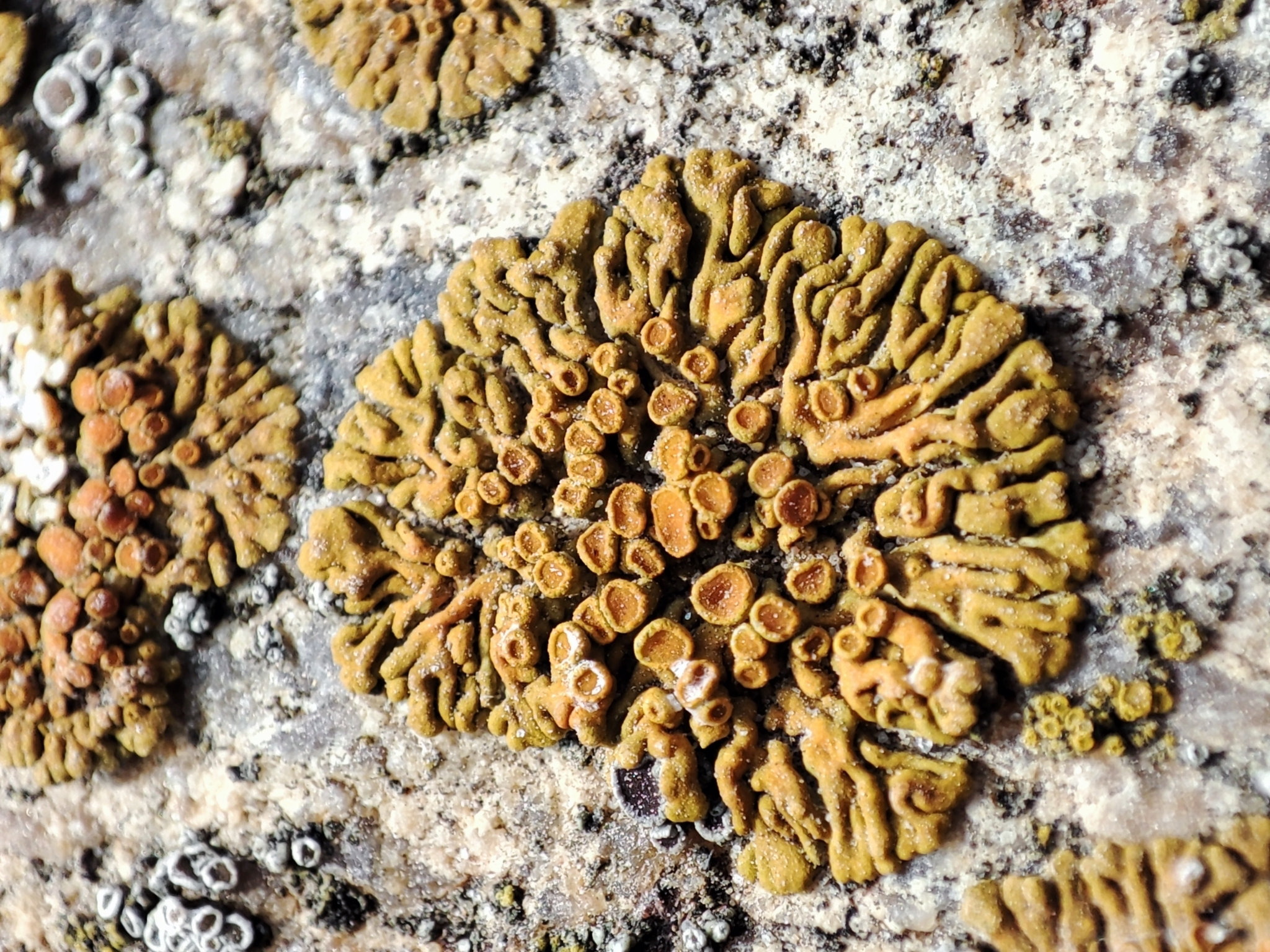
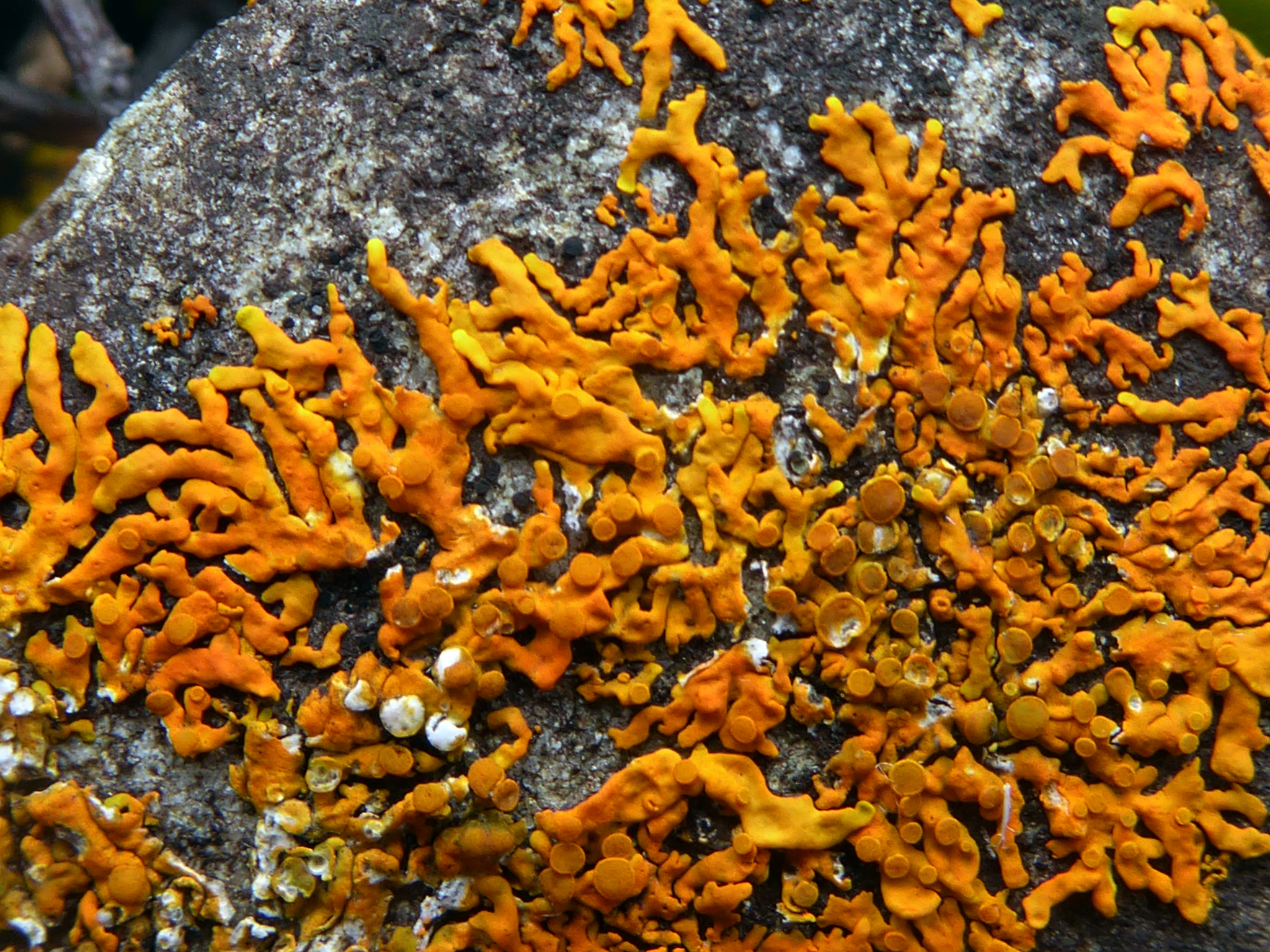
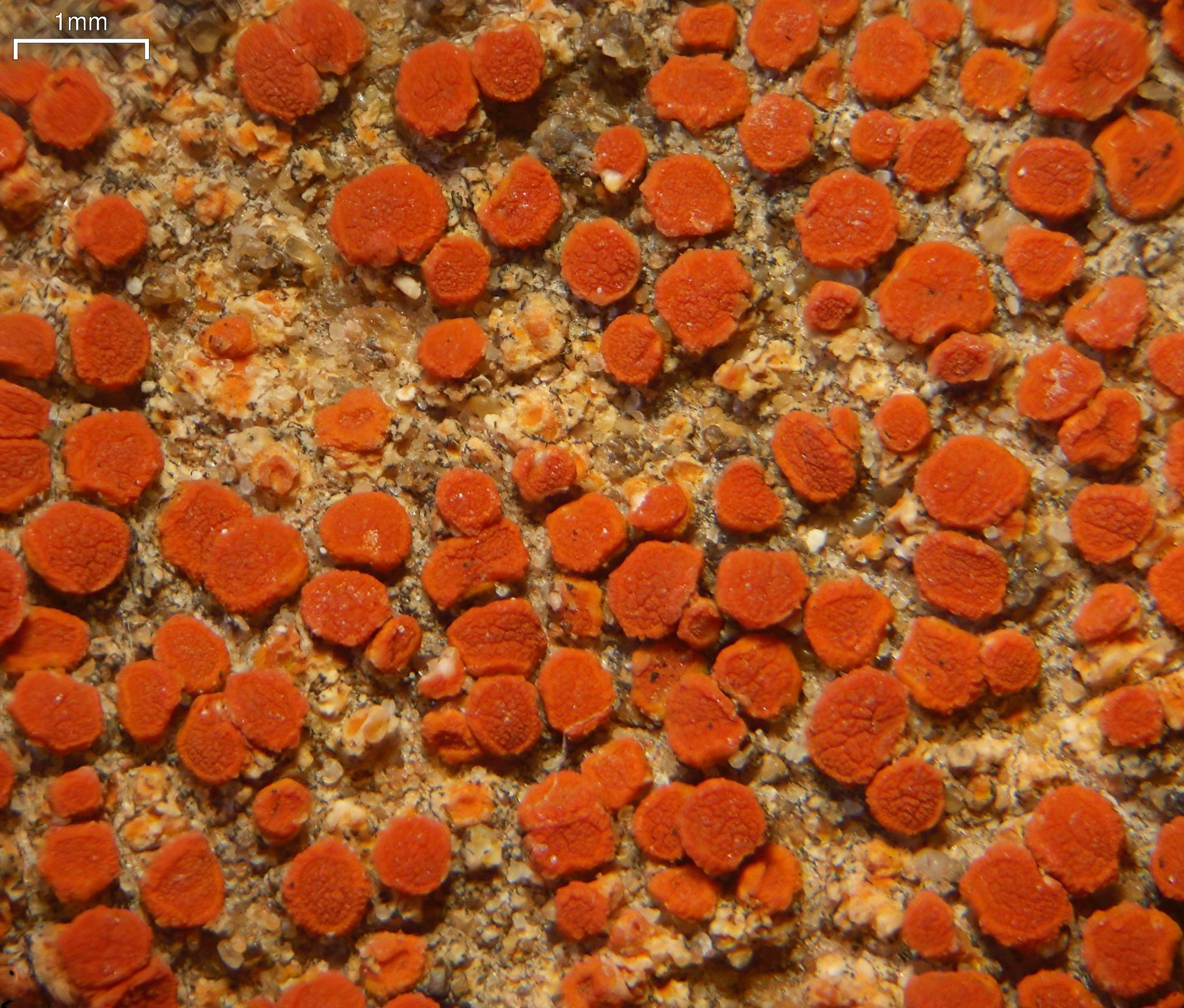
Examples from subfamily Xanthorioideae (clockwise from upper left): Athallia scopularis; Calogaya saxicola; Dufourea ligulata; and Xanthocarpia crenulatella
- Amundsenia Søchting, Garrido-Ben., Arup & Frödén (2014) – 2 spp.
- Athallia Arup, Frödén & Søchting (2013) – 17 spp.
- Austroplaca Søchting, Frödén & Arup (2013) – 10 spp.
- Calogaya Arup, Frödén & Søchting (2013) – 19 spp.
- Cerothallia Arup, Frödén & Søchting (2013) – 4 spp.
- Charcotiana Søchting, Garrido-Ben. & Arup (2014) – 1 sp.
- Coppinsiella S.Y.Kondr. & Lőkös (2018) – 3 spp.
- Dijigiella S.Y.Kondr. & L.Lőkös (2017) – 2 spp. (Note: Wilk and colleagues suggest that Dijigiella is a putative synonym of Teuvoahtiana.)
- Dufourea Ach. (1809) – 25 spp. (Note: Kondratyuk and colleagues in 2014 suggested that the genus Dufourea was polyphyletic, and divided it into four genera: Dufourea, Jackelixia, Langeottia, Ovealmbornia, and Xanthokarrooa; Wilk and colleagues prefer to retain a more broadly defined Dufourea pending further research.)
- Erichansenia S.Y.Kondr., Kärnefelt & A.Thell (2020) – 3 spp.
- Flavoplaca Arup, Søchting & Frödén (2013) – 28 spp.
- Fominiella S.Y.Kondr., Upreti & Hur (2017) – 2 spp.
- Gallowayella S.Y.Kondr., Fedorenko, S.Stenroos, Kärnefelt, Elix & A.Thell (2012) – 15 spp. (Note: Kondratyuk and colleagues suggested that Xanthomendoza was polyphyletic, and split it into Gallowayella, Golubkovia, Oxneria, Honeggeria, Jesmurraya, and Xanthomendoza; Wilk and colleagues agree that Xanthomendoza is polyphyletic, but prefer a conservative approach (maintaining Arup et al.'s 2013 classification) pending further research.)
- Golubkovia S.Y.Kondr., Kärnefelt, Elix, A.Thell & Hur (2014) – 1 sp.
- Gondwania Søchting, Frödén & Arup (2013) – 4 spp.
- Honeggeria S.Y.Kondr., Fedorenko, S.Stenroos, Kärnefelt, Elix, Hur & A.Thell (2012) – 1 sp.
- Huriella S.Y.Kondr. (2017) – 5 spp. (Note: Bungartz and colleagues synonymise Huriella with Squamulea.)
- Igneoplaca S.Y.Kondr., Kärnefelt, Elix, A.Thell & Hur (2014) – 1 sp.
- Jackelixia S.Y.Kondr., Fedorenko, S.Stenroos, Kärnefelt & A.Thell (2009)
- Jesmurraya S.Y.Kondr., Fedorenko, S.Stenroos, Kärnefelt, Elix, Hur & A.Thell (2012) – 1 sp.
- Langeottia S.Y.Kondr., Kärnefelt, Elix, A.Thell & Hur (2014) – 2 spp.
- Lazarenkoella S.Y.Kondr., Kärnefelt, A.Thell, Elix & Hur (2015) – 2 spp.
- Martinjahnsia S.Y.Kondr., Fedorenko, S.Stenroos, Kärnefelt, Elix, Hur & A.Thell (2012) – 1 sp.
- Massjukiella S.Y.Kondr., Fedorenko, S.Stenroos, Kärnefelt, Elix, Hur & A.Thell (2012) – 8 spp.
- Orientophila Arup, Søchting & Frödén (2013) – 15 spp.
- Ovealmbornia S.Y.Kondr., Fedorenko, S.Stenroos, Kärnefelt, Elix & A.Thell (2009) – 3 spp.
- Oxneria S.Y.Kondr. & Kärnefelt (2003) – 4 spp.
- Pachypeltis Søchting, Arup & Frödén (2013) – 7 spp.
- Parvoplaca Arup, Søchting & Frödén (2013) – 6 spp.
- Polycauliona Hue (1908) – 18 spp.
- Rusavskia S.Y.Kondr. & Kärnefelt (2003) – 19 spp.
- Scythioria S.Y.Kondr., Kärnefelt, Elix, A.Thell & Hur (2014) – 3 spp.
- Seawardiella S.Y.Kondr., I.Kärnefelt & A.Thell (2018) – 2 spp.
- Shackletonia Søchting, Frödén & Arup (2013) – 5 spp.
- Solitaria Arup, Søchting & Frödén (2013) – 1 sp.
- Squamulea Arup, Søchting & Frödén (2013) – 15 spp.
- Teuvoahtiana S.Y.Kondr. & Hur (2017) – 3 spp.
- Tomnashia S.Y.Kondr. & Hur (2017) – 4 spp.
- Transdrakea Søchting & Arup (2023) – 2 spp.
- Verrucoplaca S.Y.Kondr., Kärnefelt, Elix, A.Thell & Hur (2014) – 1 sp.
- Xanthocarpia A.Massal. & De Not. (1853) – 12 spp.
- Xanthodactylon P.A.Duvign. (1941) – 2 spp. (Note: Kondratyuk and colleagues resurrected and recircumscribed Xanthodactylon in 2008; other sources place this genus in synonymy with Dufourea.)
- Xanthokarrooa S.Y.Kondr., Fedorenko, S.Stenroos, Kärnefelt, Elix & A.Thell (2009) – 2 spp.
- Xanthomendoza S.Y.Kondr. & Kärnefelt (1997) – 20 spp.
- Xanthopeltis R.Sant. (1949) – 1 sp.
- Xanthoria (Fr.) Th.Fr. (1860) – 10 spp.
- Zeroviella S.Y.Kondr. & Hur (2015) – 8 spp.

=== Invalid names ===
Some of the genera proposed during the restructuring of the family have since been shown to be nomenclaturally illegitimate or unavailable for use. For example:

- Andina Wilk, Pabijan & Lücking (2021) has been replaced with Wilketalia.
- Phaeoplaca Søchting, Arup & Bungartz (2020) has been replaced with Obscuroplaca.
- Tayloriella S.Y.Kondr., Kärnefelt, A.Thell, Elix & Hur (2015) has been replaced with Tayloriellina.

== Habitat, distribution, and ecology ==
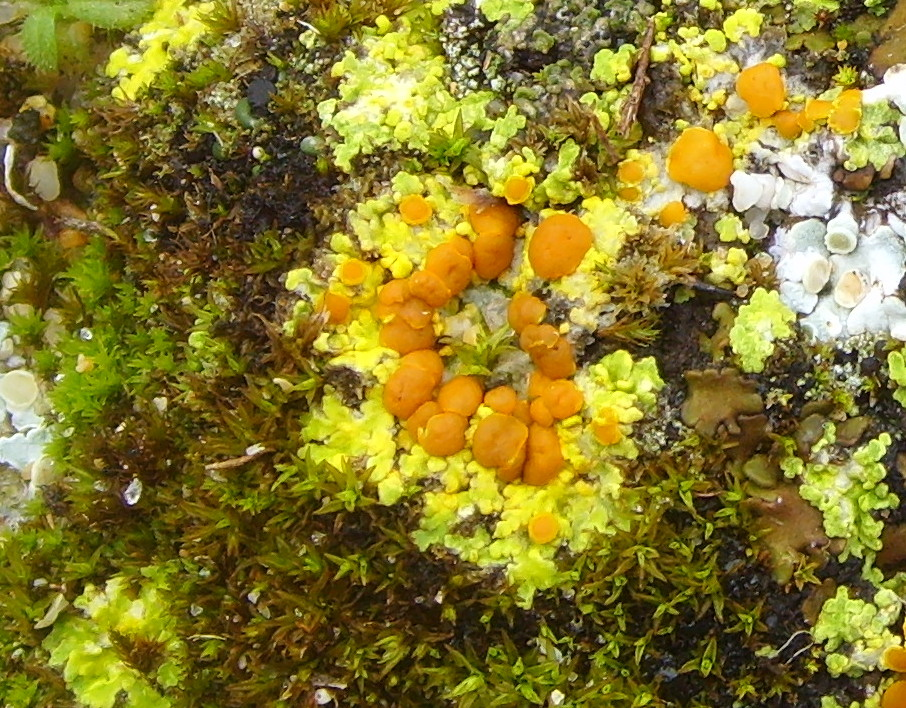
The scrambled egg lichen, Gyalolechia fulgens, is a ground-dwelling species and a component of some biological soil crusts.

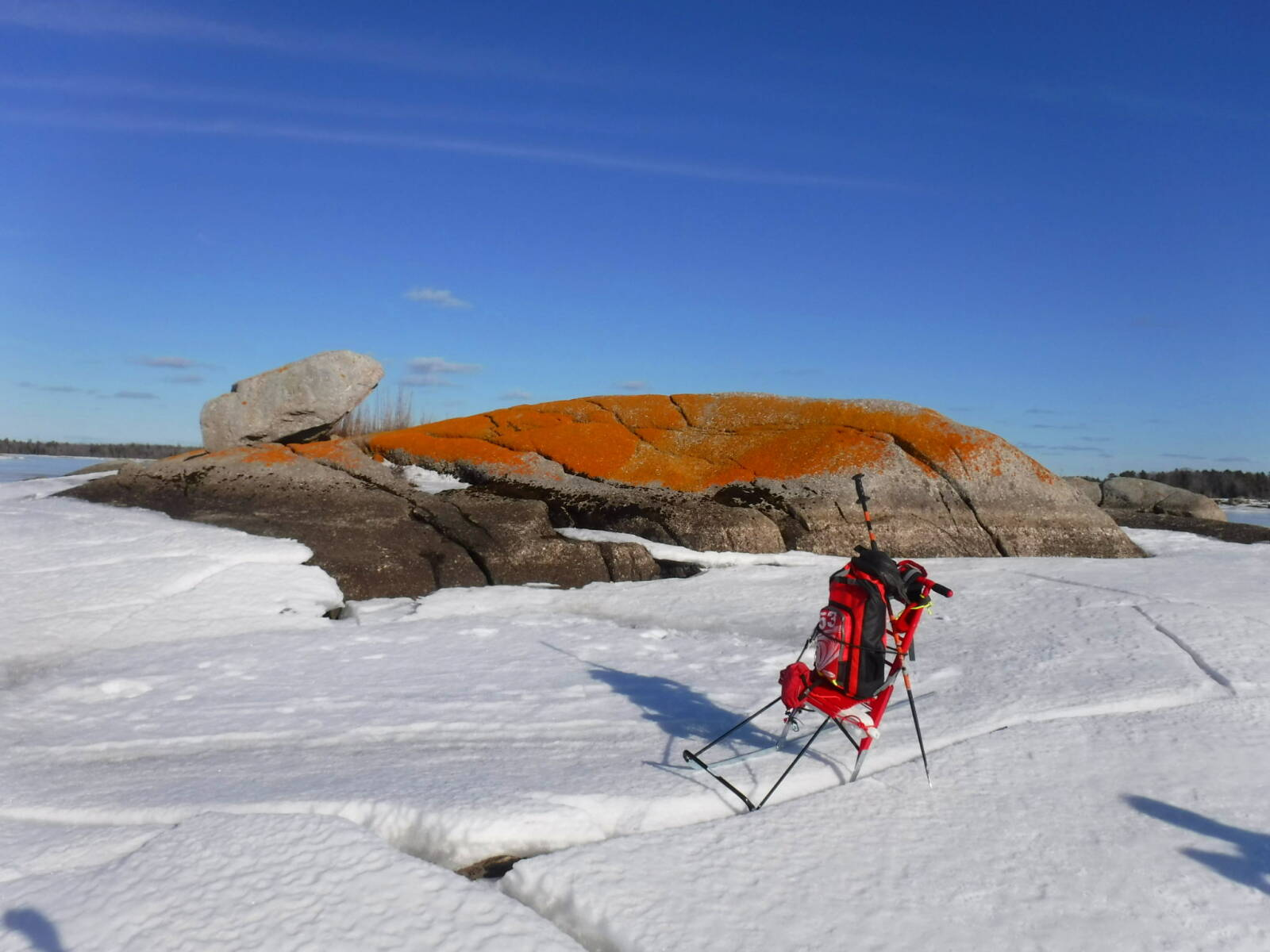
This rock in Gaspereau Lake is frequented by great black-backed gulls, creating the conditions for a localised nitrogen-rich environment conducive to the growth of the orange lichen Rusavskia elegans.

The family has a worldwide distribution, although members occur predominantly in temperate regions, and in semi-arid regions of the subtropics. Most members either grow on rock (saxicolous) or on bark (corticolous). As an exception to this general ecological preference, the genus Bryoplaca contains species that only grow on mosses and detritus. Some Fulgensia species grow on soils, particularly those rich in lime. Several crustose Teloschistaceae species, typically saxicolous in nature, have been recorded growing on human bone remains recovered at a looted Late Holocene aboriginal cairn burial site in Argentina.

Many species of the family are moderately to strongly nitrophilous, meaning that they prefer habitats rich in nitrogen, particularly in the form of nitrate. Adapted to environments with high sunlight exposure, Teloschistaceae lichens show an enhanced ability to fix carbon from the atmosphere, a crucial process for their sustenance and growth. These lichens also have an increased capacity to absorb excess nitrogen, a trait linked to their adaptation to intense light conditions. This dual adaptation – improved carbon fixation and nitrogen absorption – is evident in the family's small foliose and crustose species, which show greater tolerance to elevated nitrogen levels. The absorption of additional nitrogen is thought to be associated with the presence of specific compounds like anthraquinones in these lichens. These compounds not only contribute to their characteristic yellow/orange colouration but may also help protect fungal cell membranes. Xanthoria parietina is one example of a widespread lichen that appears to be experiencing an increase in its range due to its ability to tolerate nitrogenous pollutants, and its potential ability to displace native lichen species as a result. Caloplaca, Fulgensia, Teloschistes, and Xanthoria are genera that are characteristic of sun-exposed habitats. In some extreme desert environments, Caloplaca (in the broad sense – including lichens historically classified in this genus) may be the only genus present; Caloplaca and Xanthoria dominate harsh coastal environments.

There are several Teloschistaceae genera that contain lichenicolous (lichen-dwelling) species. These non-lichenised fungi originate from subfamily Caloplacoideae: Caloplaca (26 spp.), Gyalolechia (1 sp.), Variospora (1 sp.); from subfamily Teloschistoideae: Catenarina (1 sp.), Sirenophila 1; and from subfamily Xanthorioideae: Flavoplaca (4 spp.), Pachypeltis (1 sp.), and Shackletonia (3 spp.). Lichenicolous species within the Teloschistaceae generally have a broad range of hosts. Their geographical distribution seems to be influenced not just by the classification of their host lichen, but also by the substrate they grow on.

Teloschistaceae has a high diversity in polar regions and a substantial number of bipolar species, i.e., species occurring in both northern and southern hemispheres but largely absent from intermediate, tropical latitudes. Examples include Gallowayella borealis, Austroplaca soropelta, and Scythioria phlogina. There is a relatively low diversity of crustose Teloschistaceae in Central Europe. Localised exceptions occur primarily in sunlit locations with either calcareous or nutrient-rich siliceous rock formations; these habitats are predominant in the alpine regions of the Alps and the Carpathian Mountains, as well as in the arid, warm rocky steppes. Some Teloschistaceae genera have a strong geographic centre of species richness; examples include Elixjohnia (Australasia), Orientophila (east Asia), Shackletonia (Antarctic and subantarctic), Stellarangia (south-western Africa), and Xanthoria (Mediterranean area).

Several studies published since 2014 have enumerated the Teloschistaceae taxa occurring in certain defined geographical areas. These include:

- Altai-Sayan region, 103 species in 31 genera
- Crimea, 119 species
- Dagestan, 85 species
- India, 115 species in 36 genera
- Italy, about 160 species
- Galápagos Islands, 24 species
- Mexico, 142 species in 6 genera
- New Zealand, about 100 species
- Russian Far East, 84 species
- Ural, 81 species

=== Species interactions ===
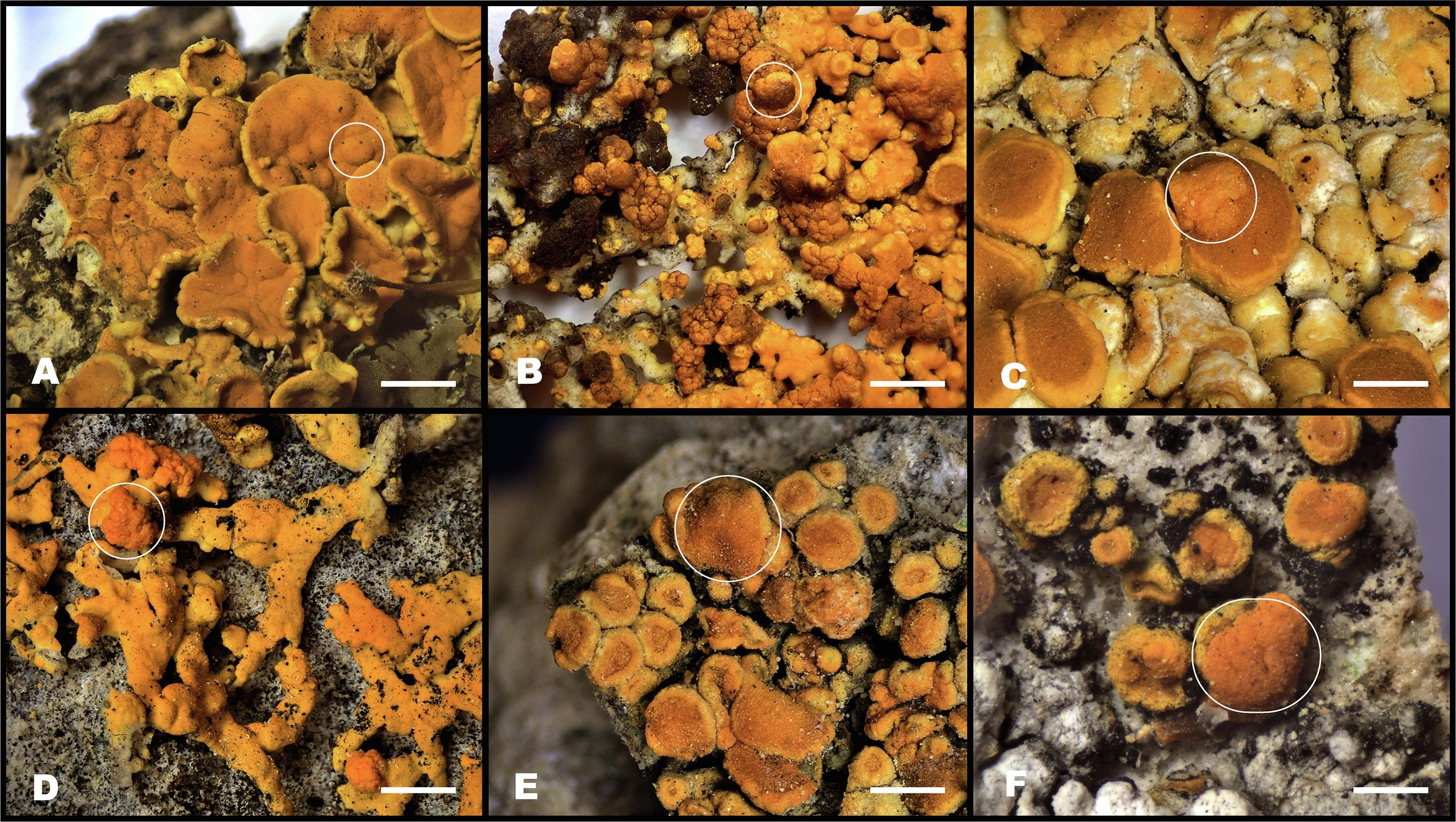
The lichenicolous Tremella caloplacae species complex on Teloschistaceae hosts: (A) on Xanthoria parietina, (B) on Rusavskia elegans, (C) on Variospora flavescens, (D) on Rusavskia sorediata, (E) on Calogaya pusilla, (F) on Xanthocarpia sp.; white circles enclose Tremella-induced galls. Scale bars = 1 mm.

Teloschistaceae species host a variety of lichenicolous fungi. Some, such as Cercidospora caudata and Stigmidium cerinae, infect a wide range of hosts within the family. More generally, these parasitic fungi have a preference for specific species or genera of Teloschistaceae. An example is the relationship between Teloschistaceae lichens and the fungus Tremella caloplacae. Integrative studies combining molecular data and ecological approaches revealed at least six distinct lineages of T. caloplacae, each specialised to a particular host, indicating a complex of closely related species. This diversification of T. caloplacae appears to have occurred in tandem with the rapid diversification of the Teloschistaceae since the Late Cretaceous period, implying coevolution. Further molecular studies have delineated the T. caloplacae group into a complex of at least nine distinct species. Out of these, five new species were formally described in 2023, each adapted to a single host species or genus within the Teloschistaceae.

== Human interactions and uses ==
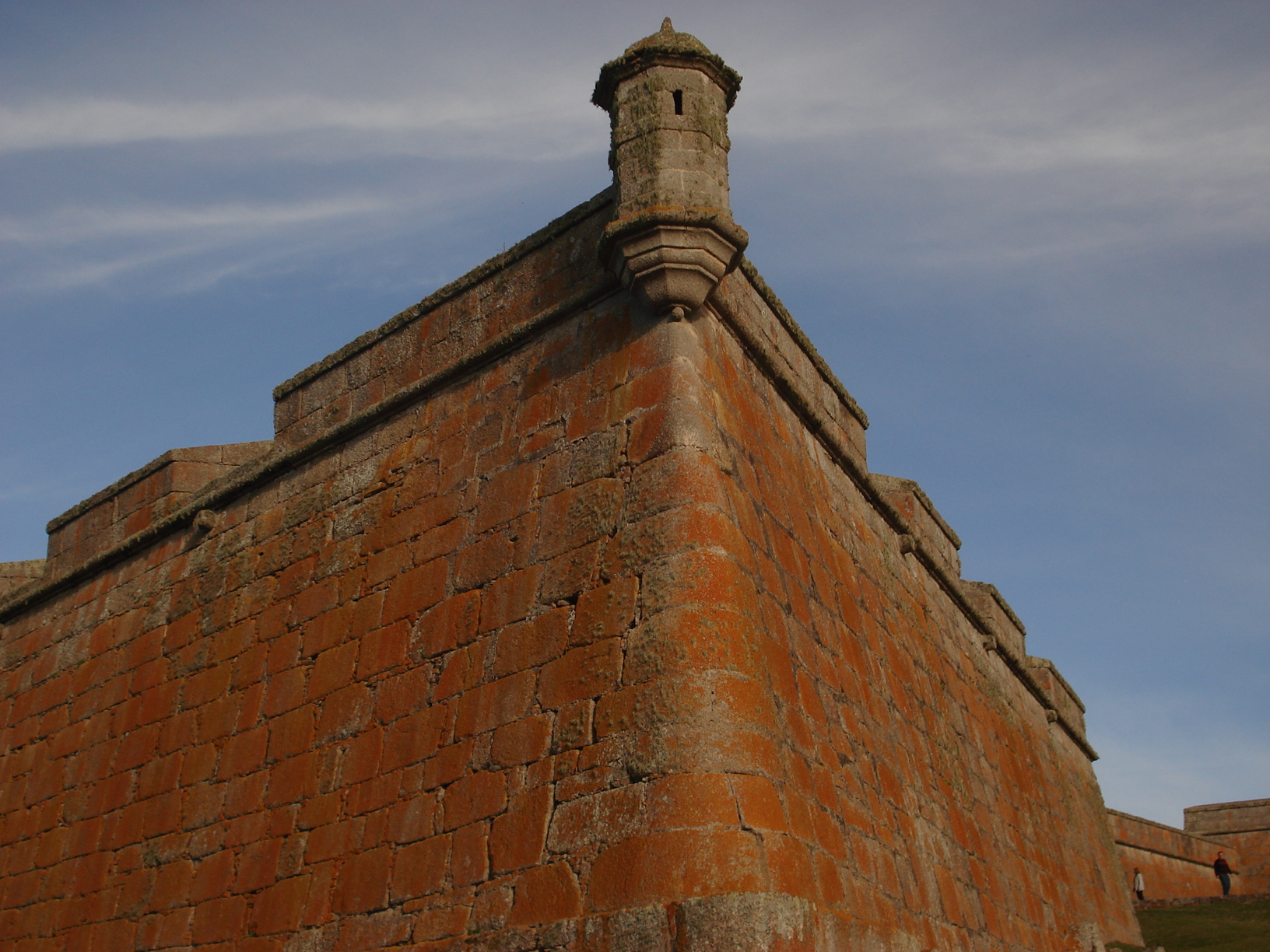
The crustose Igneoplaca ignea covers walls of the Fortaleza de Santa Teresa, a 260-year-old military fortification in Uruguay.

Although Teloschistaceae species are not economically significant, their tendency to grow on rock surfaces has been documented to cause damage to marble structures. In some cases, the lichens, the major contributor of which was Xanthocarpia feracissima, penetrated up to 10 mm (3/8 in) into the stone along larger cracks and 0.05 mm (1/500 in) beneath loose surface crystals, leading to crumbling of the marble surface. Caloplaca pseudopoliotera and C. cupulifera are two crustose species responsible for the slow degradation of the Konark Sun Temple in India.

=== Traditional medicine ===
Some Teloschistaceae species have been used in traditional medicine practices across several cultures. Xanthoria parietina has a significant history of use. In Spain, this lichen has been traditionally included in wine-based decoctions for menstrual issues, and infused in water as a purported remedy for kidney and tooth ailments. It has also served as an analgesic and a component in a cold medicine. During the early modern era in Europe, Xanthoria parietina was commonly boiled in milk as a treatment for jaundice, a practice also applied to Polycauliona candelaria. X. parietina has been used to treat diarrhoea, dysentery, bleeding, as a malaria remedy in the absence of quinine, and for hepatitis. In Traditional Chinese medicine, this lichen has been used as an antibacterial.

In regional practices, Rusavskia elegans is used for treating wounds; in Afghanistan, it is applied directly. In Kyrgyzstan, the lichen is mixed with butter and used as a remedy for diarrhoea in livestock. Teloschistes flavicans is used in China for its purported properties of "clearing heat" in the lung and liver, and removing toxins. Oxneria fallax has been incorporated into traditional Tibetan medicinal treatments.

=== In science ===
The presence of Xanthoria parietina in urban ecosystems, even in high pollution areas, offers potential insights for biomonitoring. Although its tolerance to air pollution allows it to persist where other species may not, its presence can be used in conjunction with more pollution-sensitive species to gauge overall air quality. In polluted environments, the health and abundance of X. parietina, relative to other less tolerant species, can provide data on the level and impact of urban pollution. Rusavskia elegans has been studied in experiments where specimens were exposed to outer space conditions, including extreme temperatures, ultraviolet radiation, and ultra-high vacuum. The results demonstrated the lichen's substantial capability to endure these conditions.

== Conservation ==
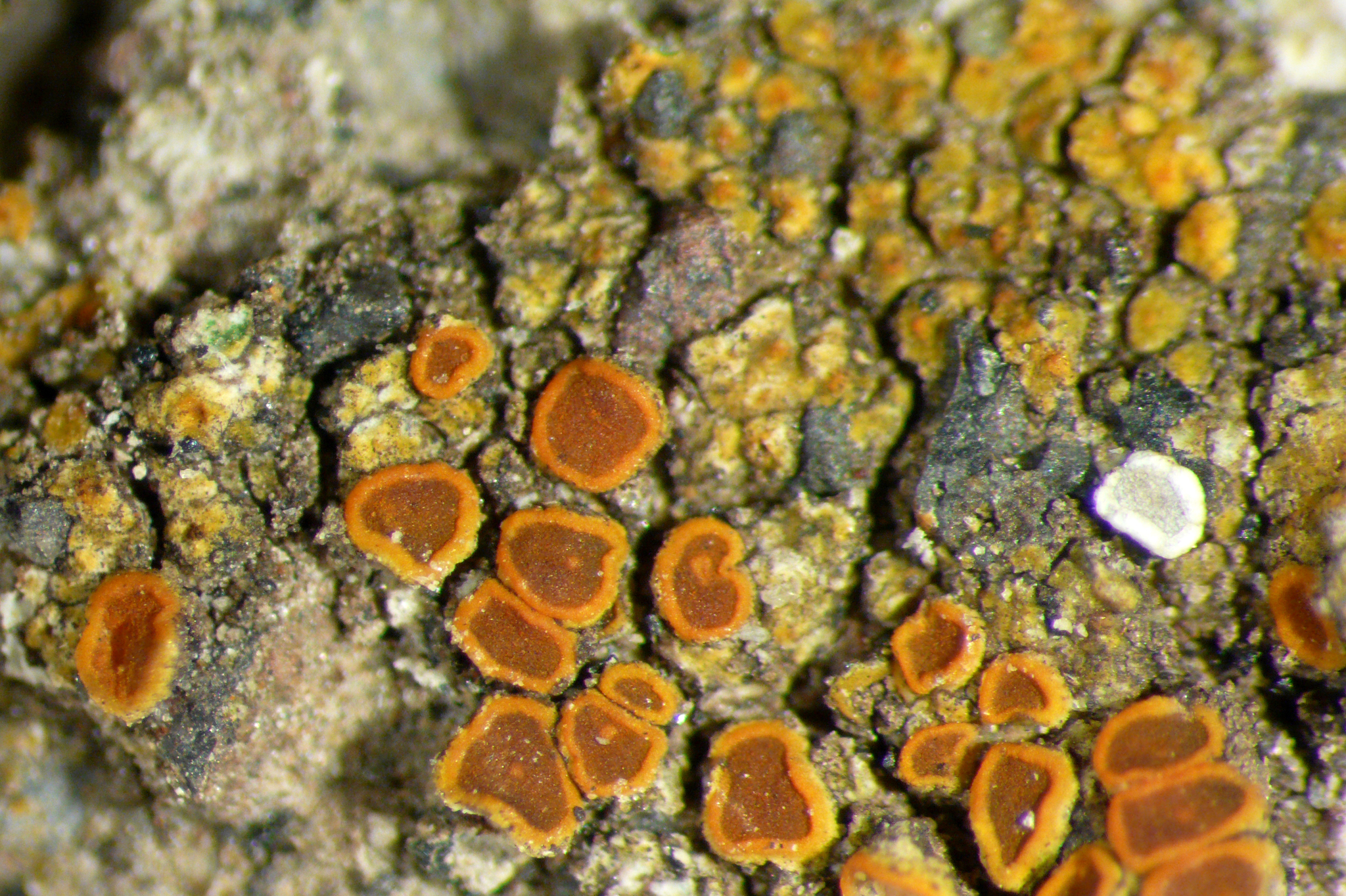
Caloplaca allanii is a poorly known New Zealand endemic.

The conservation status of three Teloschistaceae species has been assessed for the global IUCN Red List. Caloplaca rinodinae-albae (vulnerable, 2017) is at risk from tourism development and increased erosion on Sardinia's coasts. Xanthaptychia aurantiaca (Endangered, 2020) faces multiple threats due to climate change in the Canadian Arctic. These include habitat loss from rapidly eroding coasts, increased sea ice melt, saline wash from storm surges, and permafrost melting. Further, the changing climate may allow the advancement of southern vegetation communities and the introduction of invasive species, potentially exacerbating the impact on this lichen by altering its native habitat. Teloschistes peruensis (Critically Endangered, 2021) is at risk due to multiple threats in Peru and Chile, including potential development, habitat fragmentation, 4x4 races like the Dakar Rally, air pollution, and the impact of livestock like goats and cows, which alter the habitat through grazing and trampling.

Other Teloschistaceae members, some with limited geographic distributions, make appearances on regional red lists. For example, the crustose New Zealand endemic Caloplaca allanii, first documented in 1932, was not collected again until 81 years later. Because of its sparsity and small total area of occupancy, it has been assessed as "Threatened/Nationally Critical" in the New Zealand Threat Classification System.

In some large geographical areas, the full extent of the diversity of Teloschistaceae taxa is not well known. Examples include South America, where the family has not historically received much attention, and China, where of 2,164 lichen species evaluated for inclusion on its red list, only 49 were members of the Teloschistaceae; 13 of those were listed as least-concern species, and the other 36 as data deficient.
