= Ioplaca =

Scientific classification
- Domain: Eukaryota
- Kingdom: Fungi
- Division: Ascomycota
- Class: Lecanoromycetes
- Order: Teloschistales
- Family: Teloschistaceae
- Genus: Ioplaca; Poelt (1977)

Type species
- Ioplaca sphalera Poelt (1977)

Species
- I. pindarensis I. rinodinoides I. sphalera

Genus of lichens

Ioplaca is a genus of crustose lichens in the family Teloschistaceae. The genus was circumscribed in 1977 by Czech lichenologist Josef Poelt with Ioplaca sphalera assigned as the type species.

== Species ==
- Ioplaca pindarensis (Räsänen) Poelt & Hinter. (1993)
- Ioplaca rinodinoides S.Y.Kondr., K.K.Ingle, D.K.Upreti & S.Nayaka (2020)
- Ioplaca sphalera Poelt (1977)
