= Hanstrassia =

Scientific classification
- Domain: Eukaryota
- Kingdom: Fungi
- Division: Ascomycota
- Class: Lecanoromycetes
- Order: Teloschistales
- Family: Teloschistaceae
- Genus: Hanstrassia; S.Y.Kondr. (2017)

Type species
- Hanstrassia lenae (Søchting & G.Figueras) S.Y.Kondr. (2017)

Species
- H. jaeseounhurii H. lenae

Genus of lichens

Hanstrassia is a genus of lichen-forming fungi in the family Teloschistaceae. It has two species. Hanstrassia is characterised by a predominantly areolate and sorediate thallus, distinguishing it from its close relative Elenkiniana.

== Taxonomy ==
Hanstrassia was circumscribed by lichenologist Sergey Kondratyuk in 2017, to contain what was then known as the Elenkiniana lenae species complex. It is a member of the Mikhtomia sensu lato clade of the subfamily Caloplacoideae, which also contains the genera Laundonia, Opeltia, and Oxneriopsis. The genus name honours Estonian lichenologist Hans Trass.

== Description ==
The thallus of Hanstrassia species are either saxicolous (growing on rocks) or terricolous (growing on soil). They are areolate in form, with effigurate or slightly lobate margins at times. The colour ranges from yellowish grey and pale yellow to ochre, orange, or brownish yellow. Often, these species have a whitish pruina, or powdery coating, on their surface. The areoles are relatively thick, with soralia that are scarce to numerous, labriform in shape, and typically located along the margins. These soralia are usually a brighter shade of yellowish to ochre compared to the rest of the thallus. The cortical layer of the thallus is either pseudoprosoplectenchymatous or scleroplectenchymatous, while the medulla is dense, made of interwoven hyphae lacking clear orientation.

The apothecia of Hanstrassia species are typically lecanorine to zeorine, sparse and dispersed. The apothecial discs are initially flat but may become somewhat convex as they mature. They are deep orange to brownish in colour, and in the early stages, they may be covered with a whitish pruina. The true exciple of the apothecia is prosoplectenchymatous. The asci contain eight spores each, and the ascospores are polarilocular. The conidia of these species are bacilliform, measuring 3–3.5 by 1–1.25 μm.

In terms of chemistry, Hanstrassia species predominantly contain the anthraquinone substance fragilin and the depsidones compounds caloploicin and vicanicin. They also have smaller concentrations of other anthraquinones like parietin and emodin, as well as the depsidone isofulgidin.

== Habitat and distribution ==
The genus Hanstrassia is primarily found in specific ecological settings across parts of the Asian continent. These species typically grow on limestone and calcareous schist, favouring the vertical cliffs in areas characterized by dry continental climates. They can also be found on sandy soil within mountainous deserts, indicating a preference for arid, rocky environments.

In terms of distribution and species diversity, the type species of the genus, Hanstrassia lenae, has a known range extending across northeastern Asia. This includes regions such as the Altai Mountains in Siberia and Mongolia, stretching to Yakutia. Hanstrassia jaeseounhurii, in contrast, has a more limited distribution and is known to occur only in its type locality in China.

There is some uncertainty regarding the taxonomic status of material previously identified as Hanstrassia lenae from Russia. Further research and clarification are needed to accurately determine the range and classification of these specimens.

== Species ==
The genus has two species:

- Hanstrassia jaeseounhurii S.Y.Kondr., C.H.Park & Lőkös (2017)
- Hanstrassia lenae (Søchting & G.Figueras) S.Y.Kondr. (2017)
