= Hanstrassia lenae =

Scientific classification
- Kingdom: Fungi
- Division: Ascomycota
- Class: Lecanoromycetes
- Order: Teloschistales
- Family: Teloschistaceae
- Genus: Hanstrassia
- Species: H. lenae

Binomial name
- Hanstrassia lenae (Søchting & G.Figueras) S.Y.Kondr. (2017)
- Holotype site: Lena Pillars, Russia

Synonyms
- Caloplaca lenae Søchting & G.Figueras (2007); Gyalolechia lenae (Søchting & G.Figueras) Søchting (2013)

Species of lichen

Hanstrassia lenae is a species of saxicolous (rock-dwelling) in the family Teloschistaceae. Described as a new species in 2007, the lichen is found in Russian Far East, Mongolia, and Siberia. It closely resembles Elenkiniana ehrenbergii but distinguished by the presence of soralia (powdery reproductive propagules) on its thallus. This species has a thick, effigurate thallus with weak marginal lobes and developed marginal, labriform (lip-shaped) soralia.

== Taxonomy ==
The lichen was named and formally described by Ulrik Søchting and Gemma Figueras in 2007, who initially classified it as a member of the genus Caloplaca. The type specimen was collected by the first author near the Lena River in Yakutia, Russia, at an elevation of 500 m (1,600 ft). The species epithet lenae refers to the river. This name was chosen through a public voting process during the Mushroom Festival in Copenhagen in 2005. Preliminary molecular phylogenetics studies indicated that C. lenae was positioned at the base of the Fulgensia clade within Caloplaca, but its exact relationship within the genus remained unclear. Its synthesis of specific depsidones aligned it with related species in Fulgensia, Teloschistes, and Caloplaca within the Teloschistaceae. In 2013, Søchting proposed a transfer to the genus Gyalolechia. Sergey Kondratyuk made it the type species of the newly circumscribed genus Hanstrassia in 2017.

== Description ==
The thallus of Hanstrassia lenae can reach up to 3 cm (1.2 in) in diameter, occasionally merging thalli to form larger patches. It has an areolate structure, with colours ranging from yellowish-grey and pale yellow to ochre, orange, or brownish-yellow, often covered in a whitish pruina. The areoles are about 1 mm in diameter, flat to somewhat bullate (blistered), and sometimes overlapping. The thallus expands by developing new small areoles at its periphery and is effigurate, with weakly lobate margins.

Soralia are labriform and numerous, typically less than 1 mm in length, forming at the margins of the areoles. Soredia are more or less spherical, yellowish to ochre, and usually brighter than the thallus. The cortex of the thallus consists of prosoplectenchymatous, intricately interwoven hyphae, while the medulla is dense and oriented.

Apothecia (fruiting bodies) in Hanstrassia lenae are lecanorine to zeorine in form, sessile, and sparse. They are about 1–1.25 mm in diameter, with an initially slightly prominent margin that becomes more pronounced in mature specimens. The disc is deep orange to brownish, starting flat and later becoming convex. The hymenium measures 150–175 μm in thickness, and asci typically contain eight spores each.

Ascospores are polarilocular, ranging from 12 to 14.6–7.5 μm in size, with a septum width of 2–3 μm. Pycnidia, found in the central part of the areoles, protrude slightly and measure 0.1–0.15 mm in diameter. Conidia (asexual spores) are bacilliform (rod-shaped) and hyaline (translucent), measuring 3–3.5 by 1–1.25 μm.

=== Chemistry ===
The main secondary metabolite (lichen product) in Hanstrassia lenae is fragilin, making up 22–47% of its total secondary chemical content. Other compounds include emodin, caloploicin, vicanicin, and isofulgidin, with small amounts of other substances also present.

=== Similar species ===
Although similar to Elenkiniana ehrenbergii in thallus structure, C. lenae differs in the darker pycnidia.

== Habitat and distribution ==
Hanstrassia lenae grows on limestone and calciferous schist, predominantly on vertical cliffs facing south, southwest, and sometimes north in dry continental regions at elevations between 300 and 1,500 m (980 and 4,920 ft). It associates with other lichen species such as Rusavskia elegans, Xanthoria sorediata, Squamarina lentigera, and Psora decipiens. It is known from limited locations in Yakutia, the Altai Region in Siberia, and Khatgal in the Mongolian People's Republic, which are all areas characterised by a continental climate.
