= Gyalolechia paradoxa =

Scientific classification
- Kingdom: Fungi
- Division: Ascomycota
- Class: Lecanoromycetes
- Order: Teloschistales
- Family: Teloschistaceae
- Genus: Gyalolechia
- Species: G. paradoxa

Binomial name
- Gyalolechia paradoxa Himelbr., Stepanch. & I.V.Frolov (2025)
- Type locality: Medny Island, Russian Far East

Species of lichen-forming fungus

Gyalolechia paradoxa is a species of lichen in the family Teloschistaceae. It was described as new to science in 2025 from collections made on Medny Island in the Commander Islands of the Russian Far East, where it grows on mosses and sometimes as a parasite on other lichens in mountain tundra. The species has an orange to orange-red body with dark rust-coloured fruiting structures, and is named for its unusual combination of traits that the authors of the species considered atypical for the genus.

== Taxonomy ==
Gyalolechia paradoxa was described as a new species in 2025 by Dmitry Himelbrant, Irina Stepanchikova and Ivan Frolov from Medny Island in the Commander Islands (Kamchatka Territory, Russian Far East). The type collection came from a mountain slope west of Lake Gladkovskoe at 146 m altitude. The species was characterised as muscicolous or lichenicolous (on Psora rubiformis), and was separated from the similar Blastenia ammiospila by its thin orange to orange-red thallus (with 7-chloroemodin and no atranorin) and by its broadly ellipsoid to roughly spherical ascospores, measuring 12–19 × 8–13 μm.

The epithet paradoxa refers to the combination of traits that the authors considered atypical for Gyalolechia, including chemistry more reminiscent of Blastenia and an occasionally parasitic way of life. In molecular phylogenetics analyses (nrITS, and a combined nrITS+nrLSU+mtSSU dataset), the species is placed within Gyalolechia in the loose sense (sensu lato). The nrITS sequences from both free-living, moss-growing material and lichenicolous thalli formed a strongly supported clade that was recovered as sister to Mikhtomia gordejevii. Although the lineage could be treated under Mikhtomia, the authors followed a broader genus concept for Gyalolechia in this study.

== Description ==
This is a small crustose lichen that grows directly on mosses or as a lichenicolous parasite. The thallus is thin and may be partly embedded in the substrate or sit on its surface, forming a continuous crust or one broken into a network of tiny crack-bounded patches (areoles) about 0.1–0.3 mm wide. It is typically orange to orange-red but may appear whitish, often with small white necrotic spots, and a black prothallus may be present. Apothecia (fruiting bodies) are usually abundant, 0.75–1.3 mm in diameter, with a dark ferruginous-red (rust-coloured) to ferruginous-brown disc and a thin, often tortuous scalloped (crenate) margin. The apothecia range from having a thin thallus-like rim mainly visible underneath zeorine to lacking it almost entirely biatorine, with the thalline exciple mainly developed on the underside and inconspicuous from above.

Microscopically, the hymenium is about 130 μm high. The upper spore-bearing layer (epihymenium) is rust-red and often covered with a conspicuous layer of granular crystals (epipsamma), while the tissue beneath the spore layer (hypothecium) is brownish and may extend downwards in the centre. Ascospores are colourless and polarilocular, usually fewer than eight per ascus and sometimes poorly developed. They are broadly ellipsoid to more or less spherical (12–19 × 8–13 μm) with septa 4–9 μm wide. Pycnidia are present, and conidia are ellipsoid to rod-shaped (bacilliform), measuring about 2.5–3.5 × 1.5 μm. In standard spot test reactions, the apothecia and thallus react K+ (deep purple) and the apothecia are C+ (red). Chemically, 7-chloroemodin was reported as the major secondary metabolite, with emodin and parietinic acid as minor compounds and traces of fragilin. It can be mistaken for Blastenia ammiospila, but that species has a whitish thallus lacking anthraquinones (and containing atranorin) and has narrower spores. When lichenicolous on Psora rubiformis it may also resemble Caloplaca psoricida, which has more elongate spores and lacks a crenate apothecial margin.

== Habitat and distribution ==
Gyalolechia paradoxa is known only from its type locality on Medny Island (Commander Islands), where it was collected in tundra on a mountain slope at about 145 m elevation. It occurs on mosses and also as a lichenicolous species on squamules (scale-like lobes) of the terricolous lichen Psora rubiformis. Reported lichen associates at the site included Epilichen scabrosus, Japewia tornoënsis, Lepra dactylina, Ochrolechia frigida, and Pertusaria bryontha.
