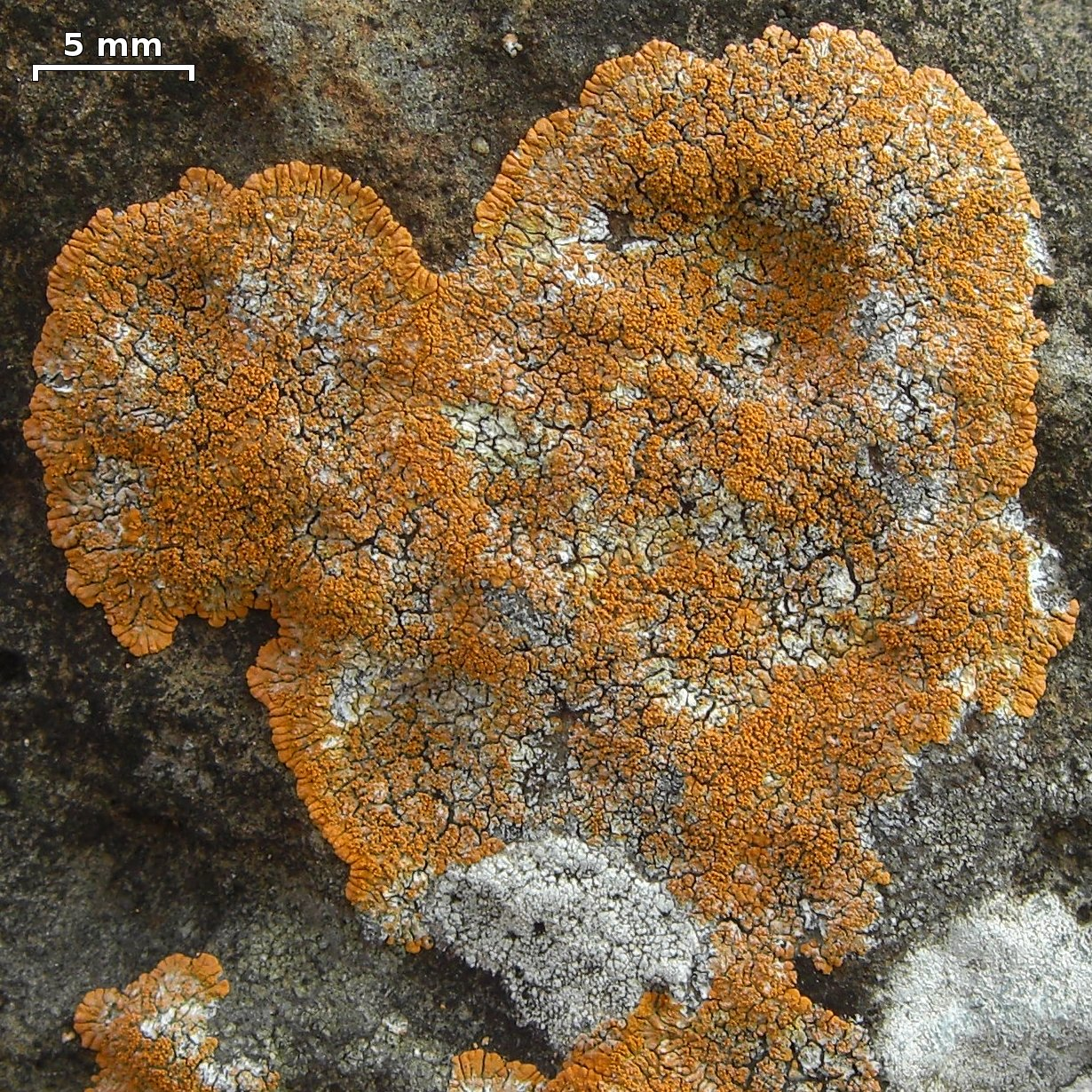
- Wetmoreana brouardii on a rock in the Galapagos Islands

Scientific classification
- Domain: Eukaryota
- Kingdom: Fungi
- Division: Ascomycota
- Class: Lecanoromycetes
- Order: Teloschistales
- Family: Teloschistaceae
- Genus: Wetmoreana; Arup, Søchting & Frödén (2013)

Type species
- Wetmoreana texana (Wetmore & Kärnefelt) Arup, Søchting & Frödén (2013)

Species
- See text

Synonyms
- Fulgogasparrea S.Y.Kondr., M.H.Jeong, Kärnefelt, Elix, A.Thell & Hur (2013)

= Wetmoreana =

Genus of lichens

Wetmoreana is a genus of lichen-forming fungi in the family Teloschistaceae. It comprises 15 formally described species, one subspecies, and three undescribed species of crustose or squamulose that are predominantly saxicolous (rock-dwelling). The genus is characterized by its distinct lobes, orange zeorine apothecia when present, and the frequent occurrence of asexual propagules such as schizidia, isidia, or soredia. A key diagnostic feature is the presence of calcium oxalate crystals in the thallus medulla of many species.

Wetmoreana species are found across a wide geographical range, including the Americas, Africa, and parts of Asia, and occur in diverse habitats from sea level to high mountain environments. They grow predominantly on siliceous rocks, with some species also found on calcareous substrates. The genus was originally circumscribed in 2013 with three species, but subsequent research, particularly a comprehensive revision by Wilk and Lücking in 2024, has significantly expanded its scope and refined its taxonomic boundaries. This revision included the synonymisation of the genus Fulgogasparrea with Wetmoreana based on molecular and morphological evidence.

== Taxonomy ==
The genus was circumscribed in 2013 by Ulf Arup, Ulrik Søchting, and Patrik Frödén, with Wetmoreana texana assigned as the type species. The genus name honours lichenologist Clifford Wetmore, "in appreciation of his major contributions to the knowledge of the North American Teloschistaceae". Initially, three species were included in the genus.

In 2024, Karina Wilk and Robert Lücking revised the genus concept, synonymising Fulgogasparrea with Wetmoreana based on molecular and morphological evidence. Fulgogasparrea had been circumscribed in 2013 by Sergey Kondratyuk and colleagues with Fulgogasparrea decipioides as the type species. The genus name alluded to the resemblance of the type species to both Fulgensia (subfamily Caloplacoideae) and Gasparrinia (subfamily Xanthorioideae) within the Teloschistaceae. Prior to its synonymisation, Fulgogasparrea comprised five species: F. appressa, F. awasthii, F. brouardii, F. decipioides, and F. intensa. The revision by Wilk and Lücking effectively transferred these species to Wetmoreana, significantly expanding the scope of the genus.

== Description ==
Species of Wetmoreana are either squamulose or crustose with distinct lobes. The thallus often forms asexual propagules, such as schizidia, isidia, granulae, soredia, or papillae. If apothecia are present, they are orange with a zeorine form. A key diagnostic feature of most Wetmoreana species is the prosoplectenchymatous parathecium (proper exciple) of the apothecia.

Ascospores are polaridiblastic with medium to long septa. The ascospore morphology varies among species, with septum thickness ranging from very thin (1–2 μm in W. rubra) to noticeably thick (up to 9.0 μm in W. appressa). Ascospore length also varies considerably across the genus.

A distinctive feature of many Wetmoreana species is the presence of calcium oxalate crystals in the thallus medulla, often forming a limited layer at the base of the algal layer. In some species, these crystals form a relatively thin and distinct crystalline layer that separates the algal layer from the lower part of the crystal-free medulla. The presence and arrangement of these crystals can be an important diagnostic character for species identification.

The upper cortex of the thallus is typically paraplectenchymatous or prosoplectenchymatous}, and a necral layer may be present in some species. The algal layer can be continuous or discontinuous, with algae sometimes arranged in distinct columns or groups.

== Comparison to similar genera ==
Wetmoreana shares morphological similarities with several other genera in the Teloschistaceae, but can be distinguished by a combination of characteristics:

Squamulea: While some Wetmoreana species (e.g., W. brachyloba, W. sliwae) are squamulose and may resemble Squamulea, they differ in several key aspects. Wetmoreana typically has a prosoplectenchymatous apothecial exciple, while Squamulea has a paraplectenchymatous exciple. Wetmoreana also tends to have larger ascospores [(9)12–22 μm vs. 8–15 μm in Squamulea] and often lacks a prothallus, which is frequently present in Squamulea.

Calogaya, Gyalolechia, and Teuvoahtiana: The lobate members of Wetmoreana differ from these genera in several ways. Wetmoreana species often have vegetative diaspores, less abundant and smaller apothecia (up to 0.9 mm vs. 1.5 mm in diameter), and regularly ellipsoid ascospores (as opposed to often broadly ellipsoid in the other genera). Additionally, when present, calcium oxalate crystals in Wetmoreana are typically located in the thalline medulla, whereas in these other genera, they are more often found in the thalline cortex.

Cinnabaria: The sublobate Wetmoreana rubra is similar to Cinnabaria boliviana, but can be distinguished by its reddish (rather than yellowish) thallus colour, initially immersed but later erumpent apothecia (vs. persistently immersed in Cinnabaria), regularly ellipsoid ascospores (vs. widely ellipsoid), and long bacilliform conidia (vs. ovoid to short bacilliform).

== Habitat and distribution ==
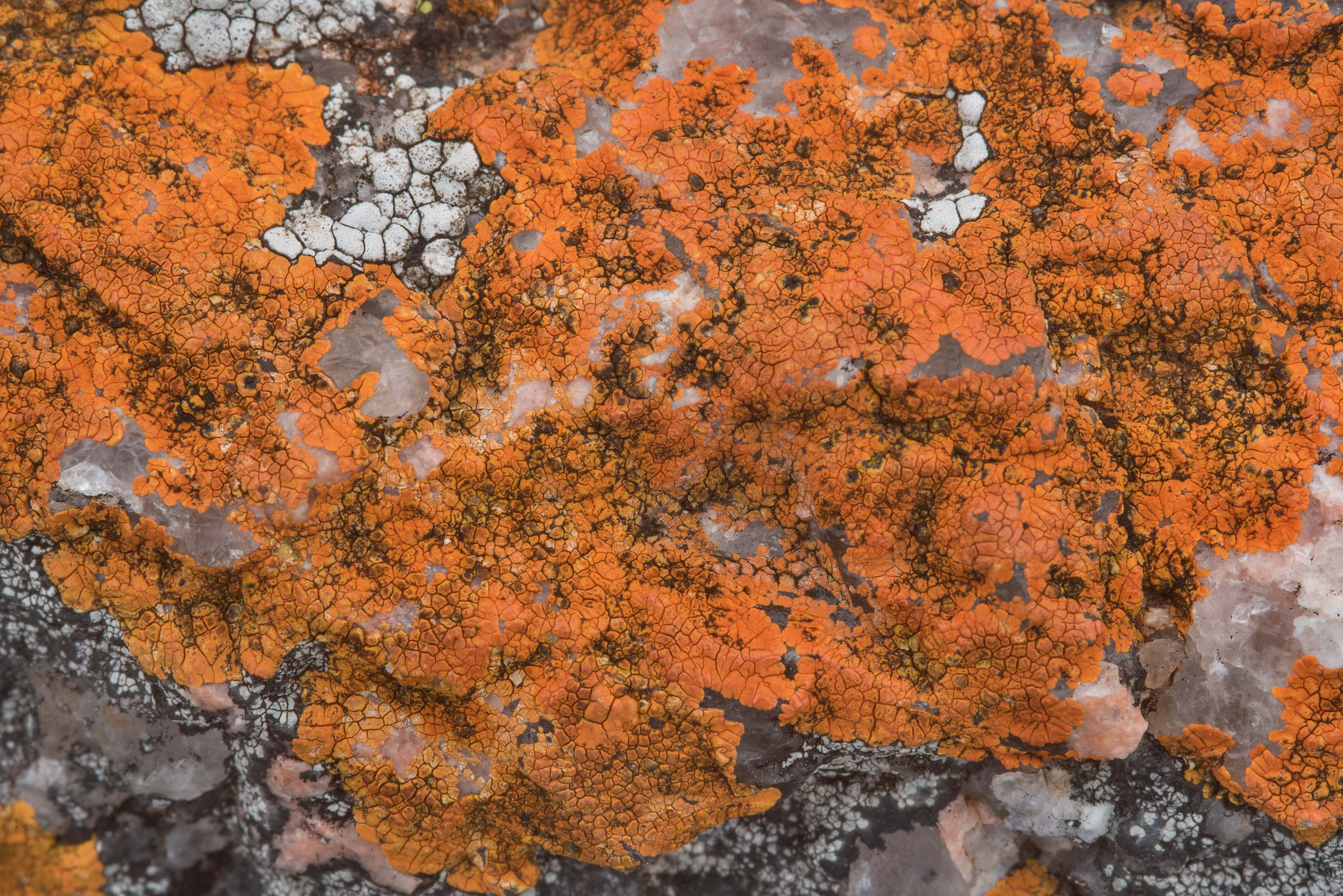
Wetmoreana appressa growing on granitic rock in Texas, USA

Wetmoreana species are exclusively saxicolous, meaning they grow on rocks. They are found predominantly on siliceous rocks, with some species also occurring on calcareous substrates. Some species, like W. rubra, are specifically found on calcareous rocks, while others such as W. ochraceofulva and W. variegata can grow on both siliceous and calcareous substrates. The genus has a wide geographical distribution, with species reported from the Americas, Africa, and parts of Asia, including the Arabian Peninsula and South Korea.

These lichens demonstrate considerable altitudinal range, occurring from near sea level to high mountain environments. They have been recorded at elevations ranging from 20 to 4,500 m (66 to 14,764 ft) above sea level. Among the species, W. sliwae is notable for its presence at the highest altitudes, found between 3,500 and 4,500 m (11,500 and 14,800 ft). In contrast, species like W. appressa, W. awasthii, and W. decipioides occur at lower elevations up to 1000 m.

Many Wetmoreana species are adapted to harsh environments and can be found in both exposed and shaded habitats. They are often found in semi-desert regions, high mountain areas, and other exposed habitats. For instance, W. sliwae has been collected in semi-desert, high mountain regions of Bolivia and Peru. Some species, like W. variegata, are known to occur in well-lit conditions. W. bahiensis is associated with dry forest habitats such as caatinga in Brazil.

Wetmoreana species often grow in association with other lichen species. For example, W. variegata is sometimes found alongside Squamulea subsoluta. Wetmoreana species are sometimes parasitised by lichenicolous fungi, as observed in W. variegata.

The distribution of individual species varies. For example, W. ochraceofulva is reported mainly from Africa, with isolated occurrences in the Arabian Peninsula and South America. In contrast, W. variegata appears to be confined to South America, having been recorded in Argentina, Bolivia, Ecuador, and Peru.

== Species ==
- Wetmoreana appressa (Wetmore & Kärnefelt) Arup, Søchting & Frödén (2013)
- Wetmoreana awasthii (Y.Joshi & Upreti) Wilk & Lücking (2024) – India
- Wetmoreana bahiensis Wilk & Lücking (2024) – Bolivia
- Wetmoreana blastidiocalcarea Aptroot, M.F.Souza & Spielmann (2023)
- Wetmoreana brachyloba (Müll.Arg.) Wilk & Lücking (2024) – Paraguay
- Wetmoreana brouardii (B.de Lesd.) Wilk & Søchting (2020) – Africa; North America; South America; Galápagos Islands
- Wetmoreana chapadensis (Malme) Wilk & Lücking (2024) – Brazil
- Wetmoreana circumlobata Wilk & Lücking (2024) – Brazil
- Wetmoreana decipioides (Arup) Arup, Søchting & Frödén (2013) – Asia
- Wetmoreana intensa (Aptroot & M.Cáceres) Wilk & Lücking (2024) – South America
- Wetmoreana ochraceofulva (Müll.Arg.) Wilk & Lücking (2024) – Africa; Arabian Peninsula; South America
- Wetmoreana rubra Wilk & Lücking (2024) – Brazil
- Wetmoreana sliwae Wilk & Lücking (2024) – Bolivia; Peru
- Wetmoreana subnitida (Malme) Wilk & Lücking (2024) – Argentina; Peru
- Wetmoreana texana (Wetmore & Kärnefelt) Arup, Søchting & Frödén (2013) – Texas, USA
- Wetmoreana variegata Wilk & Lücking (2024) – Peru

The taxonomic status with Wetmoreana appressa is complex and currently unresolved. Originally described as part of Wetmoreana, it was later transferred to Fulgogasparrea. However, Wilk and Lücking found that the type specimen of W. appressa differs morphologically from the sequenced specimen labeled as W. appressa in GenBank. This suggests that the sequenced specimen may represent an undescribed species, indicating the need for further investigation to clarify the true identity and placement of W. appressa within Wetmoreana.

Former species:

- Wetmoreana tenax (L.Lindblom) S.Y.Kondr., Kärnefelt, Elix, A.Thell, M.H.Jeong & Hur (2013) = Massjukiella tenax
