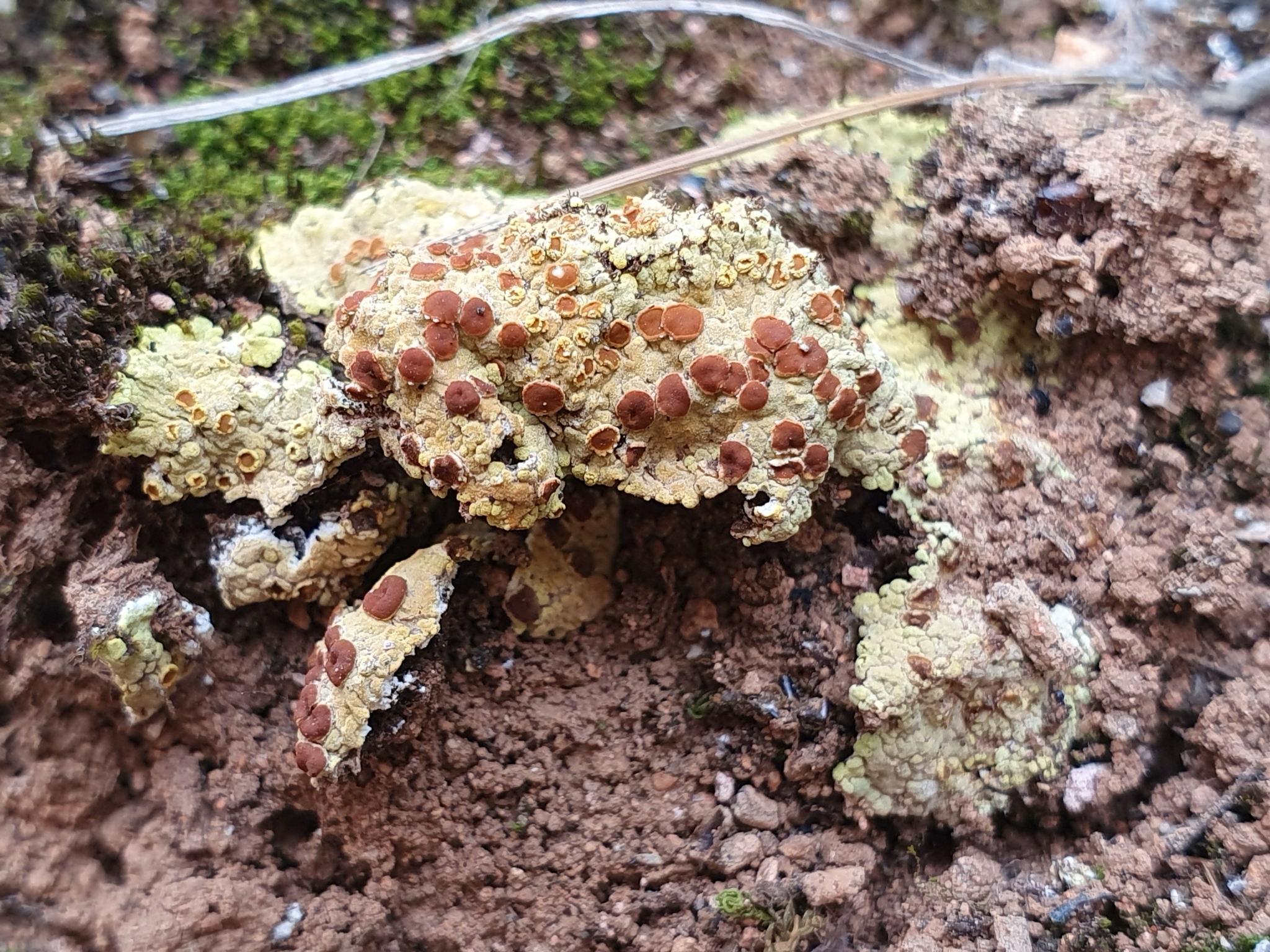

Conservation status
- Apparently Secure (NatureServe)

Scientific classification
- Kingdom: Fungi
- Division: Ascomycota
- Class: Lecanoromycetes
- Order: Teloschistales
- Family: Teloschistaceae
- Genus: Gyalolechia
- Species: G. fulgens

Binomial name
- Gyalolechia fulgens (Sw.) Søchting, Frödén & Arup (2013)

Synonyms
- List: Lichen fulgens Sw. (1784); Parmelia fulgens (Sw.) Ach. (1803); Placodium fulgens (Sw.) DC. (1805); Lecanora fulgens (Sw.) Ach. (1810); Patellaria fulgens (Sw.) Wallr. (1831); Squamaria fulgens (Sw.) Hook. (1833); Parmelia friabilis var. fulgens (Sw.) Schaer. (1840); Biatora fulgens (Sw.) Fr. (1845); Lecanora friabilis var. fulgens (Sw.) Rabenh. (1845); Zeora fulgens (Sw.) Flot. (1849); Psoroma fulgens (Sw.) A.Massal. (1852); Caloplaca fulgens (Sw.) Zahlbr. (1903); Fulgensia fulgens (Sw.) Elenkin (1907)

= Gyalolechia fulgens =

Species of lichen

Gyalolechia fulgens, the scrambled egg lichen, is a species of terricolous (ground-dwelling), squamulose lichen in the family Teloschistaceae. The lichen comprises overlapping, slightly pruinose lemon-yellow scales with a lobed margin. It grows on highly calcareous substrates such as chalk, limestone and shell sand, often in association with the moss species Trichostomum crispulum.

== Taxonomy ==
The species was first formally described by the Swedish taxonomist Olof Swartz in 1784, as Lichen fulgens. In its long taxonomic history, it has been proposed for inclusion in several genera, including Biatora, Caloplaca, Fulgensia, and Lecanora, among others. It was transferred to the genus Gyalolechia in 2013 by Ulrik Søchting and colleagues, as part of a molecular phylogenetics-based restructuring of the Teloschistaceae. Its common name, "scrambled egg lichen'", alludes to its overlapping yellow scales with white margins. The species epithet fulgens is Latin for "shining". Another vernacular name is "yellow ground lichen".

== Description ==
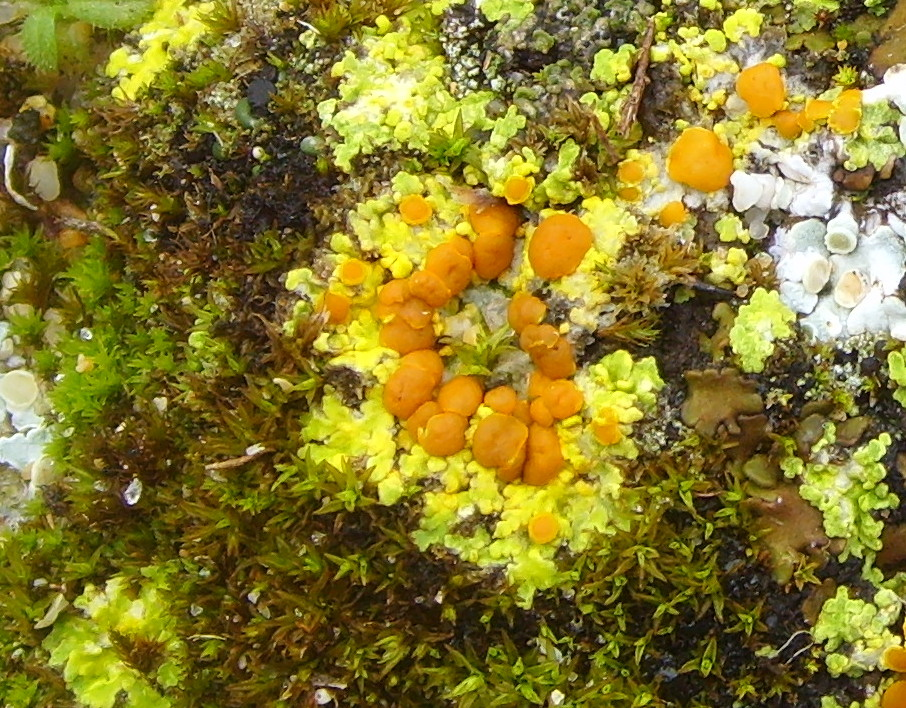
growing on moss

Gyalolechia fulgens has a distinctive appearance and colouration, which makes it readily identifiable. The body of the lichen, known as the thallus, typically spans between 1 and 3 cm in diameter. It has a vibrant orange-yellow to whitish hue and forms a rosette-like shape, though it can also appear irregular and fragmented. The thallus is somewhat placodioid in form, meaning it has a crust-like centre with outwardly radiating lobes. The marginal lobes of the thallus are neatly defined and usually longer than they are broad, often exceeding 1 mm in width. These lobes tend to remain distinct or may overlap, particularly towards the centre. As the lichen ages, the central area often develops a verrucose-bullate texture—characterised by wart-like protrusions—and becomes coarsely dusted with a pale, powdery substance known as pruina.

Schizidia, which are specialised scale-like reproductive propagules, are variably present on the surface of Gyalolechia fulgens. In many populations, part of the thallus surface is dedicated to the production of these structures. When schizidia are shed, they reveal the underlying white medulla, which is the inner layer of the thallus.

Apothecia, the spore-producing structures, are often found on this lichen. They are small, measuring 0.5 to 1.5 mm in diameter. Initially concave with a thalline exciple (a rim-like structure surrounding the apothecia), they become convex over time, with the margin appearing more or less excluded. The deep orange colour of the apothecia contrasts with the paler colour of the thallus. The ascospores of Gyalolechia fulgens measure 9 to 12 by 3.5 to 5 μm and are typically either non-septate (without divisions) or one-septate (with a single division). They come in various shapes: ellipsoid (oval), pyriform (pear-shaped), or clavate (club-shaped).

Chemical spot tests yield specific reactions that are characteristic of this species. A potassium hydroxide (K) test turns the thallus purple, indicating the presence of the secondary metabolites (lichen products) parietin and its precursor, emodin. Under ultraviolet light, the thallus shows a dull, pale orange colour due to the presence of fragilin and caloploicin. The apothecia also turn purple with the K test, indicative of physcion.

== Habitat and distribution ==
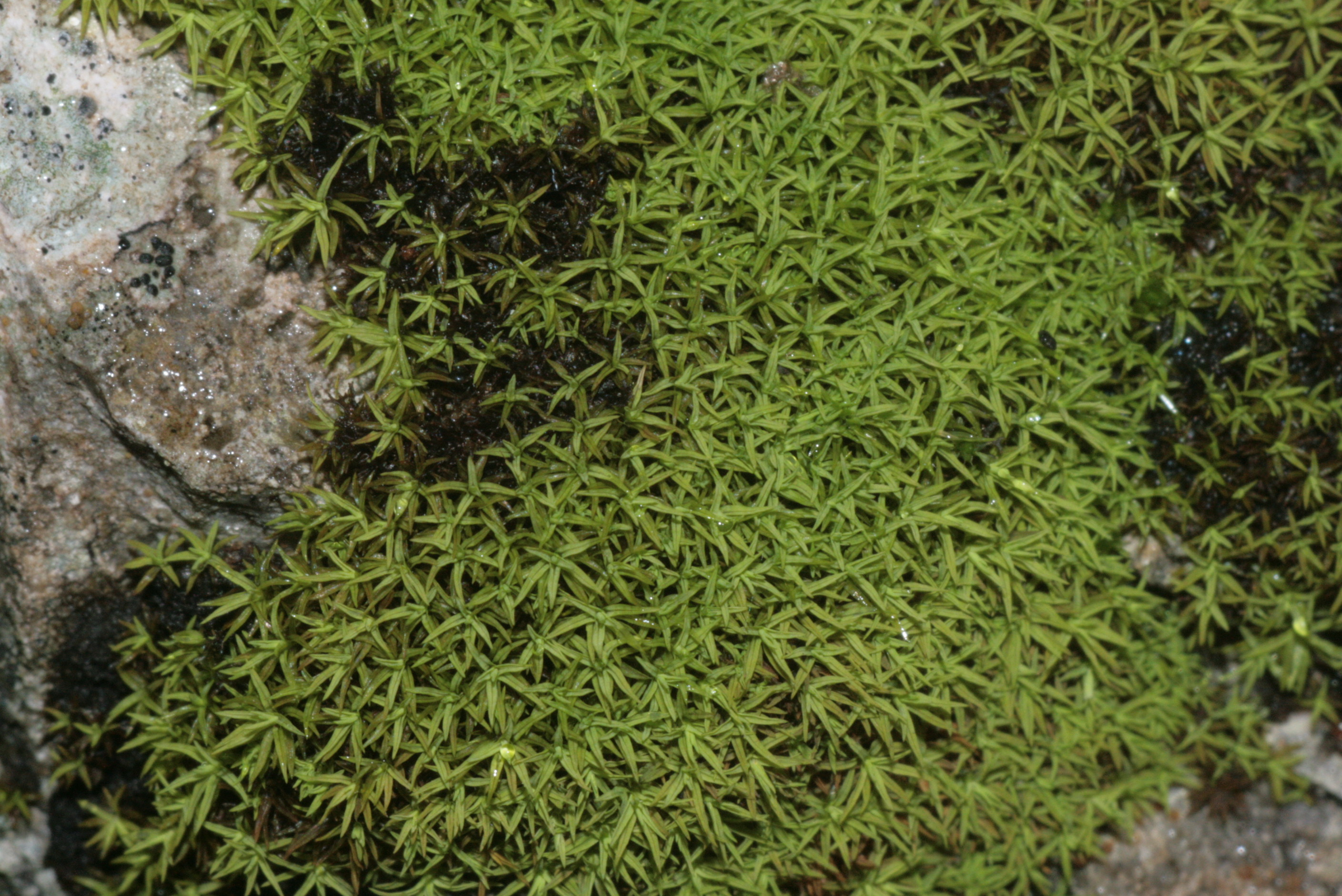
The moss Trichostomum crispulum is a frequent associate of Gyalolechia fulgens.

Gyalolechia fulgens is typically found in environments that are well-lit and offer well-drained, basic substrates. This lichen thrives on stable and firm surfaces such as chalk grasslands and compacted shell-sand. It is frequently found in warm and sheltered locations that are still open to the elements, favouring sites that are close to sea level. These habitats are often adjacent to dunes. A notable aspect of the habitat of Gyalolechia fulgens is its association with certain moss species, particularly Trichostomum crispulum.

Geographically, Gyalolechia fulgens has a wide distribution. It is found across Europe and is widespread in the warmer regions of the Northern Hemisphere. The lichen is also present in Australia and New Zealand, indicating its adaptability to various climatic conditions within these regions. In the United Kingdom, it is considered rare. In Wales, it seems to be restricted to coastal areas. Gyalolechia fulgens belongs to a group of specialised lichens that thrive in highly open environments that typically feature areas of exposed soil and often include small rock outcrops. These settings are characterised by minimal competition from larger, vascular plants, allowing these lichens the space and resources they need to grow. Gyalolechia fulgens is a prominent component of the biological soil crust lichen community of the Negev desert, and is particularly common on north-west facing slopes and interdunes. In North America, it is found in the interior of the continent with a range extending north to the Arctic.

== Species interactions ==
Lichenochora epifulgens is a lichenicolous fungus that parasitises Gyalolechia fulgens.
