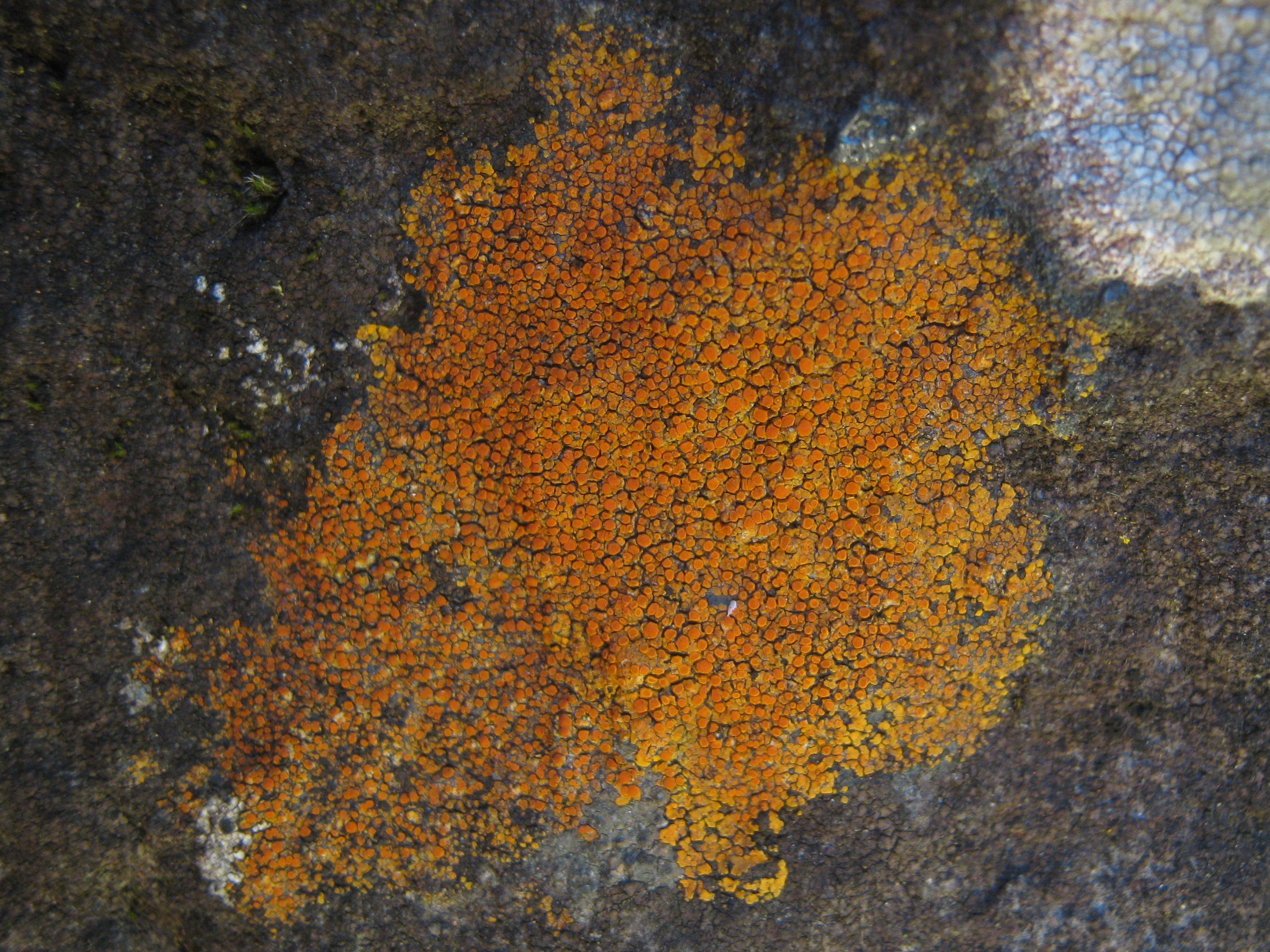

Conservation status
- Secure (NatureServe)

Scientific classification
- Domain: Eukaryota
- Kingdom: Fungi
- Division: Ascomycota
- Class: Lecanoromycetes
- Order: Teloschistales
- Family: Teloschistaceae
- Genus: Gyalolechia
- Species: G. flavovirescens

Binomial name
- Gyalolechia flavovirescens (Wulfen) Søchting, Frödén & Arup (2013)

Synonyms
- Lichen flavovirescens Wulfen (1787); Lecanora flavovirescens (Wulfen) Duby (1830); Lecidea flavovirescens (Wulfen) Fr. (1831); Caloplaca flavovirescens (Wulfen) Dalla Torre & Sarnth. (1902); Blastenia flavovirescens (Wulfen) B.de Lesd. (1914)

= Gyalolechia flavovirescens =

Species of lichen

Gyalolechia flavovirescens is a species of saxicolous (rock-dwelling), crustose lichen in the family Teloschistaceae.

== Taxonomy ==
The species was first formally described by Franz Xaver von Wulfen in 1787, as Lichen flavovirescens. During its taxonomic history it has been proposed for transfers into the genera Blastenia, Lecanora, Lecidea, and Caloplaca by various authors. In 2013, Ulrik Søchting, Patrik Frödén, and Ulf Arup transferred it to the genus Gyalolechia as part of a molecular phylogenetics-led restructuring of the Teloschistaceae.

A variety of this species, Gyalolechia flavovirescens var. persica, was described by Ödön Szatala in 1940 based on a specimen collected in Iran. This variety is characterised by a yellow thallus with tall, convex areoles and orange apothecia (fruiting bodies) measuring 0.3–0.5 mm in diameter. It has been found growing on calcareous rock alongside Caloplaca bullata and Candelariella oleaginescens.

== Research ==
A study published in 2019 examined the survivability of Gyalolechia flavovirescens under high doses of helium-beam radiation, simulating aspects of the space environment. The researchers measured respiration and photosynthetic rates as indicators of the lichen's vital signs. They found that while photosynthetic rates decreased with increased radiation doses, respiration rates remained relatively constant even at doses above 10 Gy. This suggests that G. flavovirescens may be able to survive in cosmic radiation environments even after losing photosynthetic ability. The study's authors posit that these findings have implications for theories of panspermia and the potential for interplanetary transfer of life.
