= Wetmoreana intensa =

Scientific classification
- Domain: Eukaryota
- Kingdom: Fungi
- Division: Ascomycota
- Class: Lecanoromycetes
- Order: Teloschistales
- Family: Teloschistaceae
- Genus: Wetmoreana
- Species: W. intensa

Binomial name
- Wetmoreana intensa (Aptroot & M.Cáceres) Wilk & Lücking (2024)

Synonyms
- Fulgogasparrea intensa Aptroot & M.Cáceres (2021)

Species of lichen

Wetmoreana intensa is a species of saxicolous (rock-dwelling), crustose lichen in the family Teloschistaceae. It is found in the Caatinga biome in Sergipe, Northeast Brazil.

== Taxonomy ==
Wetmoreana intensa was scientifically described as a new species in 2021 by the lichenologists André Aptroot and Marcela Cáceres under the name Fulgogasparrea intensa. The type specimen was collected by the authors in the Trilha Cangaço Eco Parque in Poço Redondo, where it was found growing on exposed granite bedrock. In 2024, a study by Karina Wilk and Robert Lücking synonymised the genus Fulgogasparrea with Wetmoreana, resulting in the new combination Wetmoreana intensa.

== Description ==
The lichen is characterised by its cinnabar red, appressed thallus made of angular areoles that transition to lobes that are elongated at the margins. The thalli are up to 5 cm (2 in) in diameter and up to 0.2 mm thick. Neither apothecia nor pycnidia (structures for sexual and asexual reproduction, respectively) were observed in the type. Thin-layer chromatography analysis of the lichen thallus showed the presence of an anthraquinone substance.

Wetmoreana intensa is phylogenetically close to W. brouardii, but differs "markedly" from that species in terms of morphology.
