= Buellia lobata =

Scientific classification
- Domain: Eukaryota
- Kingdom: Fungi
- Division: Ascomycota
- Class: Lecanoromycetes
- Order: Caliciales
- Family: Caliciaceae
- Genus: Buellia
- Species: B. lobata

Binomial name
- Buellia lobata Trinkaus & Elix (2001)

Species of lichen

Buellia lobata is a species of terricolous (soil-dwelling) lichen in the family Caliciaceae. Found in Australia, it was formally described as a new species in 2001 by lichenologists Ulrike Trinkaus and John Elix. The type specimen was collected in Blanchetown (Murray Region, South Australia); here, in a parking area after the bridge, on the east side of the Murray River, the lichen was found growing on soil. It has also been recorded from Western Australia. The lichen occurs on calcareous soil in mallee, often with other terricolous lichens including species of Endocarpon, Toninia, Eremastriella crystallifera, Fulgensia bracteata, and Psora decipiens. Secondary compounds that occur in the lichen include arthothelin and thuringione as major components, and minor amounts of 4,5-dichloronorlichexanthone and thiophanic acid. The species epithet lobata refers to the distinct lobes that comprise the thallus.

== See also ==
- List of Buellia species
