= Gyalolechia orientoinsularis =

Scientific classification
- Kingdom: Fungi
- Division: Ascomycota
- Class: Lecanoromycetes
- Order: Teloschistales
- Family: Teloschistaceae
- Genus: Gyalolechia
- Species: G. orientoinsularis

Binomial name
- Gyalolechia orientoinsularis I.V.Frolov, Himelbr., Stepanch. & Davydov (2025)
- Type locality: Medny Island, Russian Far East

Species of lichen-forming fungus

Gyalolechia orientoinsularis is a species of corticolous (bark-dwelling) crustose lichen in the family Teloschistaceae. It was described as new to science in 2025 from the Commander Islands in the Russian Far East, and has also been recorded from Sakhalin. The lichen has a thin yellow body with contrasting reddish-brown fruiting structures, and grows on the bark of shrubs and trees in coastal meadows and mountain slopes.

== Taxonomy ==
Gyalolechia orientoinsularis was described as a new species in 2025 by Ivan Frolov, Dmitry Himelbrant, Irina Stepanchikova and Evgeny Davydov from collections made on Medny Island, part of the Commander Islands. The epithet refers to its known island distribution in the Russian Far East.

In a multi-locus phylogenetic analysis, the species falls within Gyalolechia in the loose sense (sensu lato). Internal transcribed spacer (ITS) sequences from the Commander Islands and from Sakhalin Island form a supported clade that did not match any previously sampled species. The authors note that the same lineage could be treated under a narrower genus concept (for example within Mikhtomia), but they adopted a broader circumscription of Gyalolechia for the study because generic limits in this group are still unsettled and further recombination would be premature.

== Description ==
This is a crustose lichen with a thin, yellow thallus that may be continuous or broken into small cracks and areoles. The edge of the thallus is often bordered by a shiny black prothallus. Apothecia (fruiting bodies) are usually abundant. They are typically round (sometimes crowded together), with a brown to reddish-brown disc and a raised yellow to orange true exciple that creates a strong colour contrast; a thalline rim is usually absent or only weakly developed at the base.

Microscopically, the species has colourless, polarilocular ascospores that are often fewer than eight per ascus (commonly 2–8) and measure about 13 × 6–7 micrometres (μm), with a septum typically around 4–5 μm wide. Pycnidia are frequent, producing ellipsoid to short-bacilliform (rod-shaped) conidia about 3–4.5 × 1.5–2 μm. In spot tests, apothecia and thallus turn purple with potassium hydroxide (K+), and the disc and inner part of the apothecial margin turn red with bleach (C+). Chemically, fragilin and 7-chloroemodin were reported as the major secondary metabolites, with smaller amounts of parietin and emodin. It can resemble Mikhtomia gordejevii, but that species has a darker, more uniformly coloured exciple, smaller conidia, and wider ascospore septa.

== Habitat and distribution ==
The species is known from a small number of collections in the Russian Far East. On the Commander Islands it was collected on the bark of shrubs or trees (including Sorbus sambucifolia and Betula) in floodplain forb meadows with small groves or scattered woody plants, at about 15–130 m elevation. It has also been reported from Sakhalin at about 380 m on the western slope of a mountain, suggesting a broader maritime north-east Asian distribution than the Commander Islands alone.

Where it was collected, associated lichens included Biatora species, Caloplaca caesiorufella, Lendemeriella kamczatica and Lecanora symmicta.
