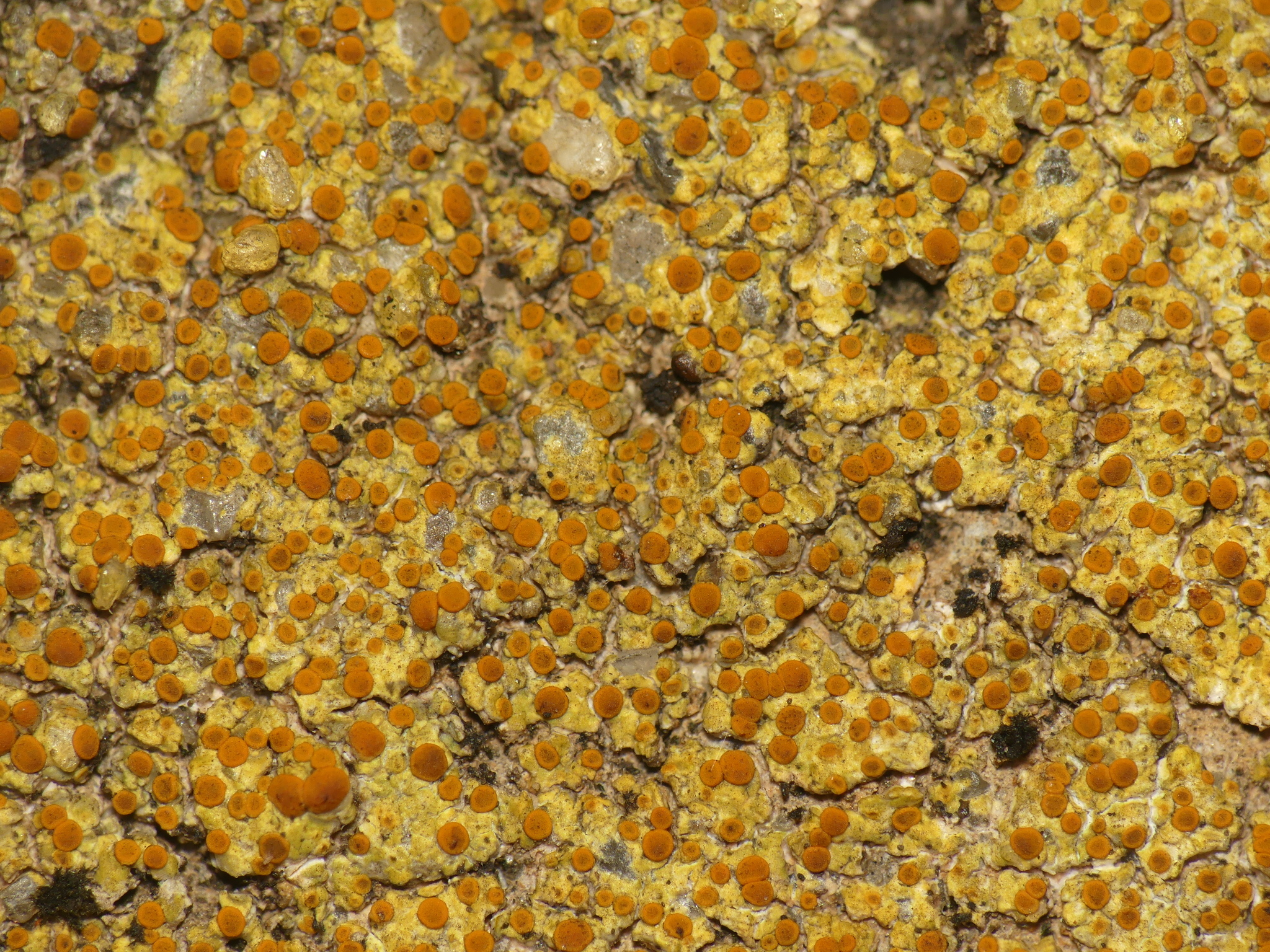
- Gyalolechia flavovirescens

Scientific classification
- Kingdom: Fungi
- Division: Ascomycota
- Class: Lecanoromycetes
- Order: Teloschistales
- Family: Teloschistaceae
- Genus: Gyalolechia; A.Massal.

Type species
- Gyalolechia aurea (Schaer.) A.Massal. (1852)

= Gyalolechia =

Genus of lichen-forming fungi

Gyalolechia is a genus of lichen-forming fungi belonging to the family Teloschistaceae. It contains about 20 species of crustose lichens.

== Taxonomy ==
The genus was circumscribed by Abramo Bartolommeo Massalongo in 1852. He included two species: G. bracteata and G. aurea. Although Massalongo did not designate a type species for the genus, Josef Poelt assigned G. aurea to that status in 1965. After Massalongo introduced the monotypic genus Fulgensia in 1853, Gyalolechia fell out of use.

Gyalolechia was resurrected for use by Ulf Arup and colleagues in 2013, as part of a molecular phylogenetics-based restructuring of the Teloschistaceae. Gyalolechia, which is sister to the genus Blastenia, contains most of the species formerly assigned to the genus Fulgensia, the species group centred around the taxon formerly known as Caloplaca flavorubescens, and other species that contain fragilin as the dominant lichen product. Twenty-five species were included in the new circumscription of the genus, but this number has since diminished as several species have been transferred from it to other new genera, including Athallia, Cerothallia, Elenkiniana, Laundonia, Mikhtomia, Opeltia, and Oxneriopsis.

== Description ==
The thallus of Gyalolechia presents as a crust-like structure that can take on various forms, ranging from small scales to lobes resembling leaves. The cortex, or outer layer, of the lichen exhibits several distinct types:

- False cortex, which resembles a cortex but does not function as one.
- Cortex consisting of irregular hyphae, characterized by long and narrow cell lumina (the spaces within the hyphae).
- Paraplectenchymatous cortex, featuring closely packed hyphae.
- Cortex with anticlinally arranged hyphae, where the hyphae are oriented at right angles, and the cell lumina are oval or oblong. The cell walls in this type of cortex are weakly gelatinized.

Apothecia, the reproductive structures of the lichen, start as zeorine and may transition into a biatorine form. These structures are typically coloured in shades of orange to brownish-orange and contain anthraquinone compounds. The ascospores produced by Gyalolechia lichens exhibit variability in shape and structure. They can be polaridiblastic, meaning they have a short to long septum. Their walls are thin, and no visible channels are present. Spores can take on fusiform (spindle-shaped), narrowly to broadly ellipsoid (similar to an elongated oval), or pyriform (pear-shaped) shapes. Occasionally, these spores may exhibit a slight curvature.

The pycnidia (structures associated with asexual reproduction) of Gyaloechia are typically orange and can be either unchambered or multi-chambered. The conidia, which are asexual spores produced within pycnidia, range in shape from bacilliform (rod-shaped) to ellipsoid.

== Species ==
As of February 2026, Species Fungorum (in the Catalogue of Life) includes 21 species in Gyalolechia.

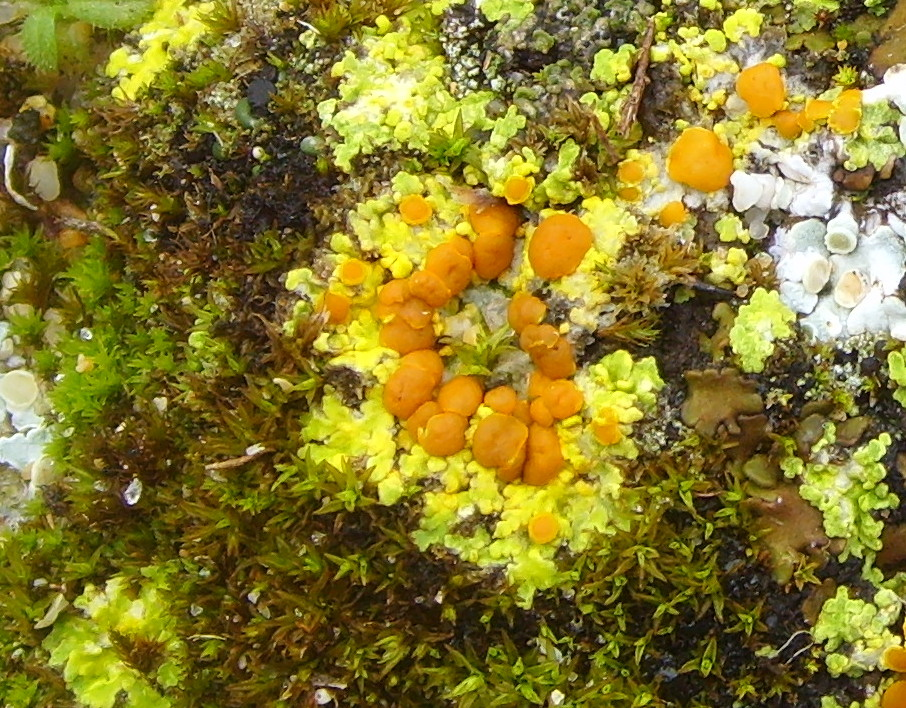
Gyalolechia fulgens

- Gyalolechia allochroa (Y.Joshi, Vondrák & Hur) Søchting, Frödén & Arup (2013)
- Gyalolechia bracteata (Hoffm.) A.Massal. (1852)
- Gyalolechia canariensis (Follmann & Poelt) Søchting, Frödén & Arup (2013)
- Gyalolechia cranfieldii (S.Y.Kondr. & Kärnefelt) Søchting, Frödén & Arup (2013)
- Gyalolechia desertorum (Tomin) Søchting, Frödén & Arup (2013)
- Gyalolechia epiphyta (Lynge) Vondrák (2016)
- Gyalolechia epiplacynthium (Etayo) Diederich (2018)
- Gyalolechia farinosa D.L.Niu (2025) – China
- Gyalolechia flavovirescens (Wulfen) Søchting, Frödén & Arup (2013)
- Gyalolechia fruticum Arup, Nimis & Vondrák (2025) – Europe
- Gyalolechia fulgens (Sw.) Søchting, Frödén & Arup (2013)
- Gyalolechia fulgida (Nyl.) Søchting, Frödén & Arup (2013)
- Gyalolechia klementii (Kalb) Søchting, Frödén & Arup (2013)
- Gyalolechia orientoinsularis I.V.Frolov, Himelbr., Stepanch. & Davydov (2025) – Commander Islands
- Gyalolechia paradoxa Himelbrant, Stepanchikova & I.V.Frolov (2025) – Commander Islands
- Gyalolechia persimilis (Wetmore) Søchting, Frödén & Arup (2013)
- Gyalolechia pruinosa Körb. (1867)
- Gyalolechia pustutata D.L.Niu (2025) – China
- Gyalolechia stantonii (W.A.Weber ex Arup) Søchting, Frödén & Arup (2013)
- Gyalolechia stipitata (Wetmore) Søchting, Frödén & Arup (2013)
- Gyalolechia subbracteata (Nyl.) Søchting, Frödén & Arup (2013)
- Gyalolechia xanthostigmoidea (Räsänen) Søchting, Frödén & Arup (2013)
