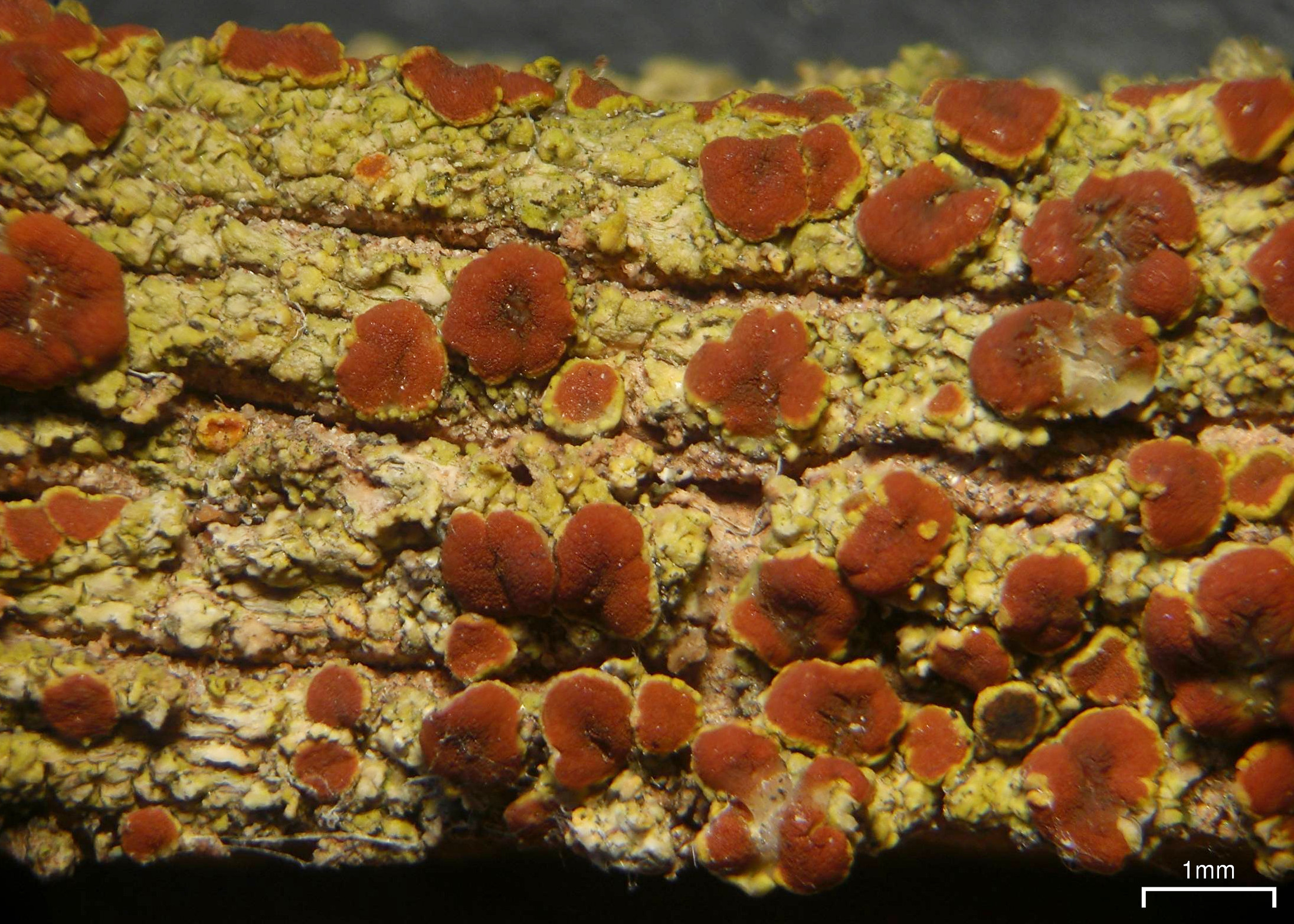
- Opeltia arizonica growing on juniper wood near Canyonlands National Park, Utah

Scientific classification
- Domain: Eukaryota
- Kingdom: Fungi
- Division: Ascomycota
- Class: Lecanoromycetes
- Order: Teloschistales
- Family: Teloschistaceae
- Genus: Opeltia; S.Y.Kondr. & Lőkös (2017)

Type species
- Opeltia neobaltistanica (S.Y.Kondr., Lőkös & Hur) S.Y.Kondr. & Lőkös (2017)

Species
- O. arizonica O. flavorubescens O. juniperina O. neobaltistanica

= Opeltia =

Genus of lichen-forming fungi

Opeltia is a genus of lichen-forming fungi in the family Teloschistaceae. It has four species of corticolous (bark-dwelling), crustose lichens.

== Taxonomy ==
The genus was circumscribed in 2017 by lichenologists Sergey Kondratyuk and Laszlo Lőkös, with O. neobaltistanica assigned as the type species. The genus name honours lichenologist Josef Poelt, "in recognition of his enormous contribution to lichenology".

Opeltia occupies a distinct monophyletic branch within the Mikhtomia clade, a phylogenetically related group of taxa that also includes the genera Hanstrassia, Laundonia, and Oxneriopsis. This clade is in the subfamily Caloplacoideae of the family Teloschistaceae.

== Description ==
Opeltia shares similarities with Blastenia. However, it can be distinguished by certain key characteristics. The thallus of Opeltia has a crustose form, appearing areolate to subsquamulose with an abrupt margin. Its colouration varies, typically presenting in shades of whitish, dirty white, and occasional yellowish tones. Opeltia lacks asexual propagules or soredia.

The apothecia of Opeltia are biatorine, occasionally manifesting as zeorine, biatorine, or lecanorine. The distinctive feature is the dark reddish-orange to rusty brown colouration of the apothecial disc. The true exciple in Opeltia has a paraplectenchymatous structure in the basal portion, transitioning into a mesodermatous paraplectenchymatous form with a well-developed matrix. A noteworthy trait is the presence of oil in the hymenium and subhymenium. Reproduction in Opeltia is characterized by eight-spored asci and polarilocular ascospores that can be quite variable in shape.

== Habitat and distribution ==
Opeltia neobaltistanica, and O. juniperina occur in Eurasia, while O. arizonica occurs in southern North America.

== Species ==
- Opeltia arizonica (H.Magn.) S.Y.Kondr. & Lőkös (2017)
- Opeltia flavorubescens (Huds.) S.Y.Kondr. & Hur (2020)
- Opeltia juniperina (Tomin) S.Y.Kondr. & Lőkös (2017)
- Opeltia neobaltistanica (S.Y.Kondr., Lőkös & Hur) S.Y.Kondr. & Lőkös (2017)
