= Elenkiniana =

Scientific classification
- Domain: Eukaryota
- Kingdom: Fungi
- Division: Ascomycota
- Class: Lecanoromycetes
- Order: Teloschistales
- Family: Teloschistaceae
- Genus: Elenkiniana; S.Y.Kondr., Kärnefelt, Elix, A.Thell & Hur (2014)

Type species
- Elenkiniana gloriae (Llimona & Werner) S.Y.Kondr., Kärnefelt, A.Thell, Elix, J.Kim, A.S.Kondr. & Hur (2014)

Species
- E. ehrenbergii E. gloriae E. gomerana

Genus of lichens

Elenkiniana is a genus of lichen-forming fungi in the family Teloschistaceae. It has three species, all of which occur in Eurasia.

== Taxonomy ==
The genus was circumscribed in 2014 by the lichenologists Sergey Kondratyuk, Ingvar Kärnefelt, John Elix, Arne Thell, and Jae-Seoun Hur. Elenkiniana gloriae is assigned as the type species. The genus name honours the Russian botanist, Alexander Elenkin, "in acknowledgement of his many contributions on cryptogams in northern Eurasia".

According to the authors, Elenkiniana shares similarities with the genus Gyalolechia (formerly known as Fulgensia before Arup and colleagues' 2013 revision of the Teloschistaceae) but is distinguished by its typically lobate thalli, laminal pseudocyphellae across the thallus surface, and the absence of numerous crystals in the cortical layer and granular inclusions in the hymenium. Despite this, the work "The 2016 classification of lichenized fungi", did not accept Elenkiniana, considering it instead synonymous with Gyalolechia. A similar opinion was expressed by Wilk and colleagues in 2021, who in their work preferred to maintain Arup et al.'s original 2013 classification pending additional research.

== Description ==
Genus Elenkiniana is distinguished by its lobate thallus, with hues ranging from yellow to bright orange or reddish orange. The thalli have pseudocyphellae, which are small, porous areas on the lichen surface that facilitate gas exchange. The cortical layer of Elenkiniana is described as palisade paraplectenchymatous, indicating a structured arrangement of cells that resembles a palisade and is tightly woven.

The apothecia (fruiting bodies) of Elenkiniana are lecanorine in form, meaning they have a margin that is similar in colour and texture to the thallus. Within these structures, the true exciple (the rim of tissue enclosing the spore-producing layer) is very thin and often indistinct. Ascospores are polarilocular (containing two compartments separated by a partition with a hole), and there are typically eight spores per ascus. The conidia, a type of asexual spore, range from bacilliform (rod-like) to narrowly bacilliform in shape.

A distinctive feature of Elenkiniana lichens is their chemical reaction to a solution of potassium hydroxide (i.e., the K+ spot test), turning purple upon contact. This reaction is due to the presence of anthraquinones, specifically those of the parietin and fragilin chemosyndromes, as well as depsidones.

== Species ==
- Elenkiniana ehrenbergii (Müll.Arg.) S.Y.Kondr., Kärnefelt, Elix, A.Thell, Jung Kim, A.S.Kondr. & Hur (2014)
- Elenkiniana gloriae (Llimona & Werner) S.Y.Kondr., Kärnefelt, Elix, A.Thell, Jung Kim, A.S.Kondr. & Hur (2014)
- Elenkiniana gomerana (J.Steiner) S.Y.Kondr., Kärnefelt, Elix, A.Thell, Jung Kim, A.S.Kondr. & Hur (2014)
