= Gyalolechia allochroa =

Scientific classification
- Kingdom: Fungi
- Division: Ascomycota
- Class: Lecanoromycetes
- Order: Teloschistales
- Family: Teloschistaceae
- Genus: Gyalolechia
- Species: G. allochroa

Binomial name
- Gyalolechia allochroa (Y.Joshi, Vondrák & Hur) Søchting, Frödén & Arup (2013)
- Holotype: Mt Jobong, South Korea

Synonyms
- Caloplaca allochroa Y.Joshi, Vondrák & Hur (2011)

Species of lichen-forming fungus

Gyalolechia allochroa is a species of saxicolous (rock-dwelling) crustose lichen in the family Teloschistaceae. It forms a thin, smooth crust on siliceous rocks in subtropical mountain regions and shows marked colour variation, occurring in both bright yellow and grey-white forms depending on light exposure. The lichen is characterised by abundant disc-like fruiting bodies with egg-yolk yellow rims and contains the pigments parietin and fragilin, which account for its distinctive colouration. It is known to occur only on three mountains in South Korea, where it was first discovered and described in 2011.

== Taxonomy ==
The lichen was formally described as a new species in 2011 by Yogesh Joshi, Jan Vondrák, and Jae-Seoun Hur, as a member of the genus Caloplaca. The type specimen was collected from Mt Jobong (Hwang-ri, Gangwon Province, South Korea) at an elevation of 980 m, where it was found growing on siliceous rock. The species epithet allochroa, derived from allochrous, means 'changing colour'. The species was reclassified in the genus Gyalolechia in 2013, as part of a major molecular phylogenetics-informed reorganisation of the family Teloschistaceae.

== Description ==
Gyalolechia allochroa forms a thin, smooth, crustose thallus on rock that is usually 6–8 cm across but only about 70–90 micrometres (μm) thick. The thallus can be continuous, finely cracked, or broken into small areoles, and a dark grey, filamentous prothallus is often visible along cracks and edges. Two colour morphs occur: a yellow form and a grey-white form. In shaded or less exposed sites the yellow morph shows orange-brown discs, whereas on strongly sun-exposed faces the thallus turns distinctly grey and the discs become brownish-black. Apothecia (the disc-like fruiting bodies) are abundant, 0.3–1.0 mm across, and biatorine, meaning the rim is formed only by fungal tissue rather than by the thallus; this rim is smooth, persistent, and egg-yolk yellow to yellow-orange, usually paler than the disc, which may carry a faint greenish-yellow frost (pruina).

Internally, the upper hymenial layer gives a K+ (purple) reaction and contains yellow-brown granules; the hymenium beneath is clear and rich in oil droplets, over a hyaline hypothecium. The proper margin is well developed and the thallus lacks a thalline margin. The ascospores are hyaline and two-celled with a narrow central bridge (polarilocular), mostly 12.5–21.5 × 6–11.5 μm with a 2.5–7.5 μm isthmus. Small rod-shaped conidia about 2.1–2.5 × 0.7–0.9 μm are produced only rarely. Standard spot tests on the thallus are largely negative: K− (or K+ purple in yellowish areas), C−, KC−, P− and UV−. The apothecia contain mainly the anthraquinone pigments parietin and fragilin (with traces of emodin and 7-chloroemodin); fragilin predominates in yellow thalli, whereas grey-white thalli show only traces of these compounds, accounting for the species' colour variation.

== Habitat and distribution ==
Gyalolechia allochroa is so far known only from South Korea, on three mountains: Mt Jobong (the type locality) and Mt Taebaek in Gangwon Province, and Mt Gyeokja in South Jeolla Province. It is saxicolous (rock-dwelling), occurring on non-calcareous bedrock in warm, subtropical parts of the country at about 350–980 m a.s.l. The lichen colonises both subvertical and horizontal faces, favouring open stands where diffuse light reaches the rock; despite nearby phorophytes such as Acer, Fraxinus, Rhododendron, Pinus and Quercus, it has not been recorded on bark. Associated lichens vary by site but include genera such as Cladonia, Leptogium, Myelochroa, Phaeophyscia, Pertusaria, Porpidia, Ramalina and Lecanora (with Aspicilia noted at one locality). Both yellow and grey-white thallus forms occur at Mt Jobong and Mt Gyeokja, whereas only the grey-white morph has been collected from Mt Taebaek; under strong exposure the thallus tends to be grey and the discs darken to brownish-black.
