= Wetmoreana decipioides =

Scientific classification
- Kingdom: Fungi
- Division: Ascomycota
- Class: Lecanoromycetes
- Order: Teloschistales
- Family: Teloschistaceae
- Genus: Wetmoreana
- Species: W. decipioides

Binomial name
- Wetmoreana decipioides (Arup) Arup, Søchting & Frödén (2013)

Synonyms
- Caloplaca decipioides Arup (2011); Fulgogasparrea decipioides (Arup) S.Y.Kondr., M.H.Jeong, Kärnefelt, Elix, A.Thell & Hur (2013)

Species of lichen

Wetmoreana decipioides is a rare species of saxicolous (rock-dwelling) crustose lichen in the family Teloschistaceae. Found in Gangwon Province, South Korea, it was described as a new species in 2011. The lobate thallus of the species is orange in colour and grows radiately in rosettes with marginal lobes, covered by smaller, irregularly arranged, often overlapping lobes in the centre.

== Taxonomy ==
This species was originally described in 2011 by Ulf Arup as a member of the large genus Caloplaca. The type specimen was collected from the inner part of the massif of the Sorak Mountains in Gangwon Province, South Korea. It was found on almost vertical rock, shaded from running water, and probably at least partly with a higher pH than true siliceous rocks. The specific epithet decipioides refers to its similarity with Caloplaca decipiens.

Arup and colleagues transferred the taxon to the genus Wetmoreana in 2013. It was briefly placed in the genus Fulgogasparrea later that year, but a study by Wilk and Lücking in 2024 synonymised Fulgogasparrea with Wetmoreana, confirming the placement of this species in Wetmoreana.

== Description ==
The lobate thallus of Wetmoreana decipioides is orange in colour and grows radiately in rosettes with marginal lobes, covered by smaller, irregularly arranged, often imbricate lobes in the centre. The lobes are slightly convex to rather flat, slightly wider toward tips, irregularly branched one to three times, divided by narrow but distinct furrows, and 0.5–2.3 mm long and 0.2–0.6 mm wide. The surface is more or less smooth to finely granular near lobe tips, and partly covered with very thin white pruina. The soralia are more or less punctiform or irregular in outline, laminal or terminal on central lobes, initiating as spherical to elongate isidia that soon dissolve into soredia. The species produces secondary metabolites (lichen products) such as parietin (major), fallacinal (major), vicanicin (major), isofulgidin (major), teloschistin (major), and traces of emodin, parietinic acid, and caloploicin.

== Habitat and distribution ==
The species was collected under an overhang of a tall rock with a river running below. The rock face was exposed to the south and there were no trees giving any shade. The lichen flora is abundant at the locality and Wetmoreana decipioides was common in suitable places away from both rain and running water. The Seoraksan National Park, where the type locality is located, has many habitats included mainly old-growth forests on steep mountain slopes dominated by deciduous trees. The climate is somewhat continental with warm summers (up to 36°C) and cold winters (down to –17°C). The annual precipitation is 1300 mm, and the mountains are snow-covered from November to April.
