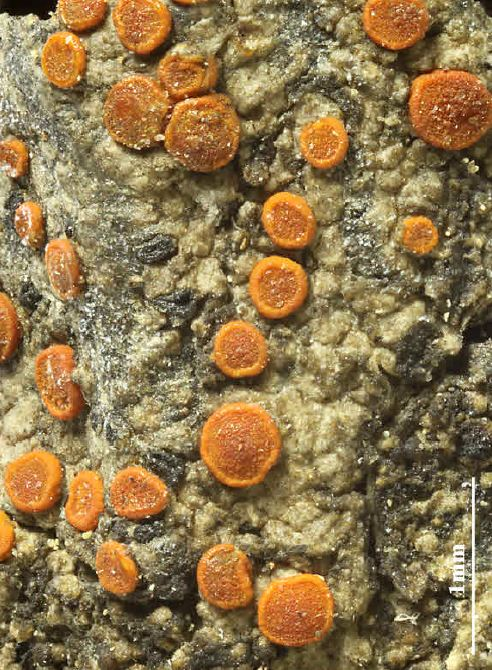

Scientific classification
- Kingdom: Fungi
- Division: Ascomycota
- Class: Lecanoromycetes
- Order: Teloschistales
- Family: Teloschistaceae
- Genus: Blastenia
- Species: B. hungarica

Binomial name
- Blastenia hungarica (H.Magn.) Arup, Søchting & Frödén (2013)

Synonyms
- Caloplaca hungarica H.Magn. (1944); Caloplaca ferruginea var. hungarica (H.Magn.) Clauzade & Cl.Roux (1985)

= Blastenia hungarica =

Species of lichen-forming fungus

Blastenia hungarica is a species of crustose lichen in the family Teloschistaceae. It forms a thin grey crust on twigs and branches of both deciduous and coniferous trees, producing small orange to pale red fruiting bodies. The species is found across Europe and the Mediterranean region, from southern Scandinavia to Turkey and the Caucasus. Originally described from Hungary in 1944, it was transferred to its current genus in 2013 based on molecular evidence.

== Taxonomy ==
The lichen was first described as a new species in 1944 by the Swedish lichenologist Adolf Hugo Magnusson, as Caloplaca hungarica. The holotype specimen of Caloplaca hungarica was collected by Ferenc Fóriss on 1 March 1917 in Veszprém County, Hungary, on fir bark near Juhászház, close to the village of Szent Ivan. In 1985, Georges Clauzade and Claude Roux considered that the taxon was more appropriately regarded as a variety of Caloplaca ferruginea (now Blastenia ferruginea). It was finally reclassified, with full species status, into genus Blastenia in 2013 following a molecular phylogenetics-informed reorganisation of the Teloschistaceae.

== Description ==
Blastenia hungarica forms a thin, grey, crustose thallus (typically under 100 μm thick) and lacks vegetative diaspores such as soredia or isidia. Apothecia are consistently small, about 0.3–0.8 mm across, with orange to pale red discs; pycnidia, when present, are dark grey due to the Cinereorufa-green pigment but are usually sparse. The ascospores are polarilocular and mostly about 13–14 μm long. These traits place the species in the "Hungarica group", whose members characteristically have reduced apothecial size (an adaptation linked to frequent growth on twigs).

In apothecial chemistry, B. hungarica shows only non-chlorinated anthraquinones (e.g., parietin series) and lacks chlorinated anthraquinones; the thallus itself is usually without anthraquinones. Cinereorufa-green may be detectable around pycnidial ostioles and in damaged apothecia but is otherwise inconspicuous. Within Blastenia, this pattern contrasts with the chlorinated chemotype of the closely related B. subathallina.

== Habitat and distribution ==
Blastenia hungarica is an epiphytic lichen, occurring mainly on twigs and occasionally on tree trunks) or exposed wood. It has been recorded on both deciduous and coniferous hosts, but shows a preference for smaller branches, a trait common to members of the so-called Hungarica group. The species occurs from lowlands to montane elevations of about 2,000 m. In northern parts of its range, such as Scandinavia, it is found mostly below 400 m, whereas in Mediterranean regions it becomes restricted to higher elevations, generally above 800 m.

Its confirmed distribution is centred in Europe and the adjacent Mediterranean region, extending from southern Scandinavia southward to Italy and eastward to Turkey and the Caucasus. Records from Iberia and Macaronesia that were formerly referred to as B. hungarica have been shown to represent other species, chiefly Blastenia xerothermica in Mediterranean habitats and Blastenia palmae in coastal western Europe and Macaronesia.
