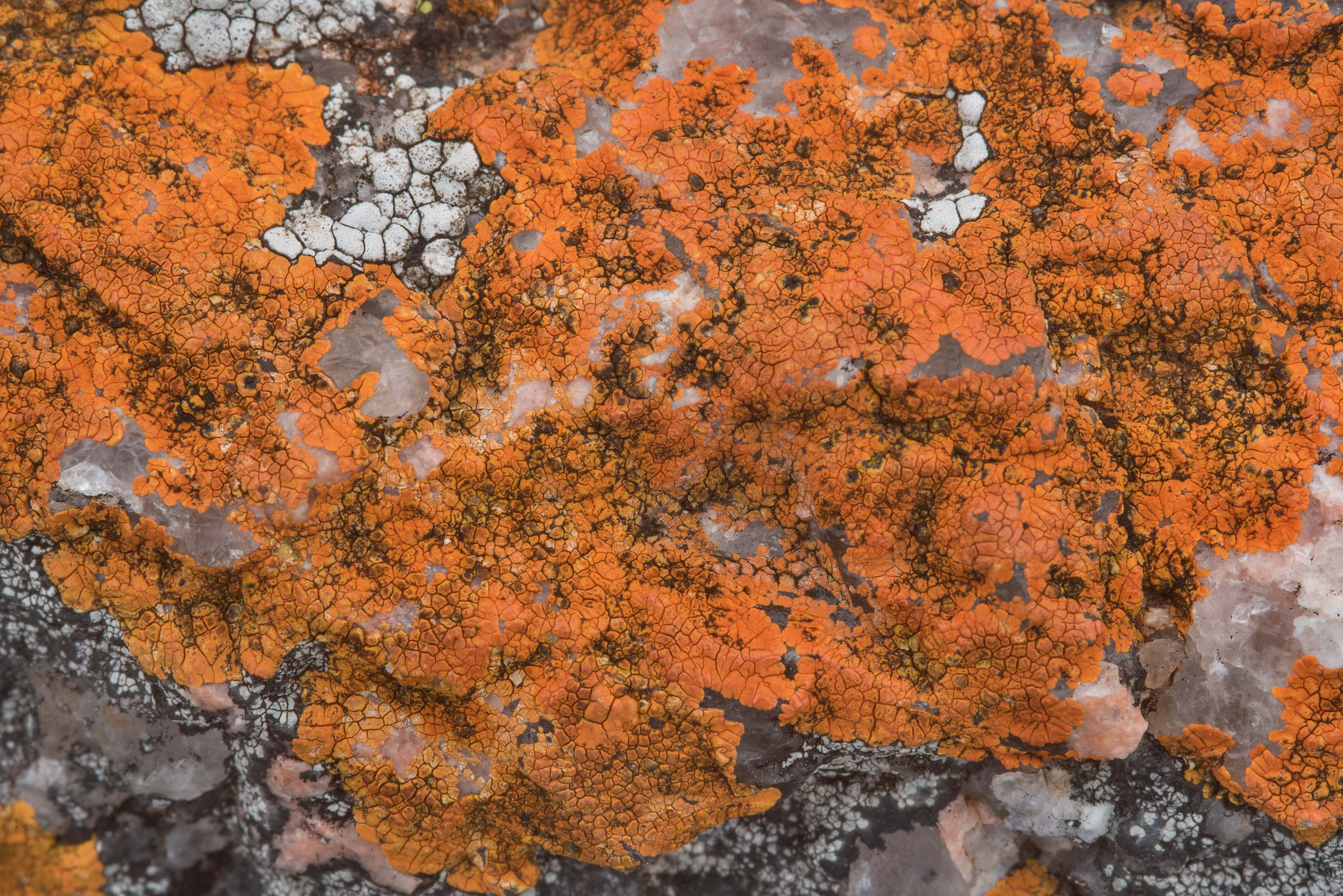

Scientific classification
- Domain: Eukaryota
- Kingdom: Fungi
- Division: Ascomycota
- Class: Lecanoromycetes
- Order: Teloschistales
- Family: Teloschistaceae
- Genus: Wetmoreana
- Species: W. appressa

Binomial name
- Wetmoreana appressa (Wetmore & Kärnefelt) Arup, Søchting & Frödén (2013)

Synonyms
- Caloplaca appressa Wetmore & Kärnefelt (1998); Fulgogasparrea appressa (Wetmore & Kärnefelt) S.Y.Kondr., Elix, Kärnefelt & A.Thell (2015)

= Wetmoreana appressa =

Species of lichen

Wetmoreana appressa is a species of saxicolous (rock-dwelling), crustose lichen in the family Teloschistaceae. It has a widespread distribution in western Mexico, including Baja California. It is characterized by its vibrant colors, unique shape, and specific habitat preferences.

== Taxonomy ==
Caloplaca appressa was scientifically described as a member of the genus Caloplaca by lichenologists Clifford Wetmore and Ingvar Kärnefelt in 1998. Ulf Arup and colleagues transferred it to the genus Wetmoreana in 2013, as part of a molecular phylogenetics-directed restructuring of the family Teloschistaceae. It was briefly placed in the genus Fulgogasparrea in 2015. However, a study by Wilk and Lücking in 2024 synonymized Fulgogasparrea with Wetmoreana, confirming the placement of this species in Wetmoreana.

The species epithet appressa alludes to the tightly appressed nature of its thallus to the rock substrate. The type specimen for this species was discovered in Sonora, Mexico, specifically 72 miles east of Hermosillo on the road to Sahuaripa, situated in a thorn forest on rhyolite (a silica-rich volcanic rock) at an elevation of about 1,900 ft (580 m).

== Description ==
The thallus of Wetmoreana appressa displays a spectrum of colors from yellowish-orange to orange. The central portion of this thallus has a patchy or areolate appearance with slightly raised patches. The lichen's margins are characterized by distinct lobes that broaden slightly at their tips. These lobes, often tightly adhered to rock surfaces, vary in size, typically falling between 0.4 and 2.2 mm in length and 0.2–0.9 mm in width. The thallus is relatively thick, reaching up to 600 μm.

The apothecia, which are reproductive structures, can either be sessile or slightly raised. These have a reddish-orange disc and are encircled by a thin thalline margin. The spores measure around 10–15 by 5.5–8 μm with a septum thickness of 4.5–9 μm. Further, the presence of pycnidia, small structures, is also noted, which are red in color. The conidia have a short bacilliform shape, measuring 3.5 μm in length on average.

A distinctive feature of W. appressa is the presence of calcium oxalate crystals in the medulla of the thallus, visible under polarized light. Standard chemical spot tests results are K+ (red) on the thallus and epihymenium, with all other tests negative.

== Habitat and distribution ==
Wetmoreana appressa grows on various types of acidic rocks situated in exposed environments. Its presence is predominantly noted in western parts of Mexico and in regions of Baja California. It has been found at elevations up to 1,000 m (3,300 ft) above sea level.
