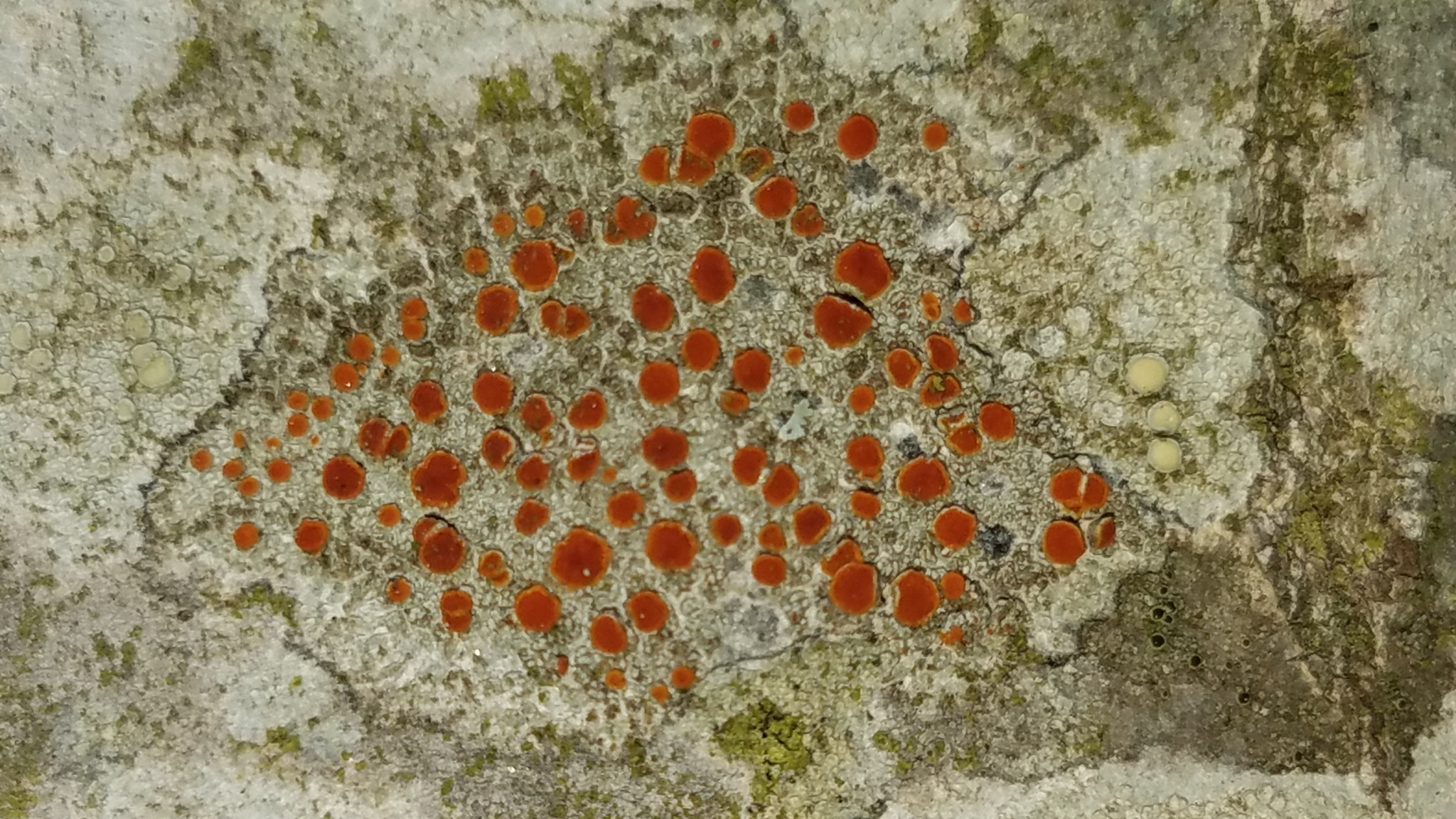

Scientific classification
- Domain: Eukaryota
- Kingdom: Fungi
- Division: Ascomycota
- Class: Lecanoromycetes
- Order: Teloschistales
- Family: Teloschistaceae
- Genus: Blastenia
- Species: B. ferruginea

Binomial name
- Blastenia ferruginea (Huds.) A.Massal. (1852)

Synonyms
- List: Lichen ferrugineus Huds. (1762); Lichen aurantiacus Lightf. (1777); Lichen parietinus D aurantiacus (Lightf.) Vill. (1789); Scutellaria aurantiaca (Lightf.) Baumg. (1790); Patellaria ferruginea (Huds.) Hoffm. (1794); Verrucaria aurantiaca (Lightf.) Hoffm. (1796); Verrucaria ferruginea (Huds.) Hoffm. (1796); Lecidea aurantiaca (Lightf.) Ach. (1803); Patellaria aurantiaca (Lightf.) DC. (1805); Parmelia aurantiaca (Lightf.) Mart. (1817); Lecanora aurantiaca (Lightf.) Flot. (1820); Biatora aurantiaca (Lightf.) Fr. (1822); Biatora ferruginea (Huds.) Fr. (1822); Lecidea ferruginea (Huds.) Chevall. (1826); Parmelia ferruginea (Huds.) Fr. (1831); Lecanora ferruginea (Huds.) Link (1833); Gasparrinia ferruginea (Huds.) Tornab. (1848); Zeora aurantiaca (Lightf.) Flot. (1849); Zeora ferruginea (Huds.) Flot. (1849); Teloschistes aurantiacus (Lightf.) Norman (1852); Teloschistes ferrugineus (Huds.) Norman (1852); Callopisma aurantiacum (Lightf.) A.Massal. (1852); Callopisma ferrugineum (Huds.) Trevis. (1852); Blastenia aurantiaca (Lightf.) Trevis. (1856); Sporoblastia aurantiaca (Lightf.) Trevis. (1856); Placodium aurantiacum (Lightf.) Anzi (1860); Caloplaca aurantiaca (Lightf.) Th.Fr. (1861); Caloplaca ferruginea (Huds.) Th.Fr. (1861); Lecanora ferruginea Nyl. (1868); Placodium cerinum var. aurantiacum (Lightf.) Branth & Rostr. (1869); Placodium cerinum var. ferrugineum (Huds.) Branth & Rostr. (1869); Placodium ferrugineum (Huds.) Hepp (1870); Amphiloma pusillum var. aurantiacum (Lightf.) Boberski (1886); Chrysomma aurantiacum (Lightf.) Acloque (1893); Chrysomma ferrugineum (Huds.) Acloque (1893); Xanthocarpia aurantiaca (Lightf.) Samp. (1927); Pyrenodesmia aurantiaca (Lightf.) C.W.Dodge & G.E.Baker (1938); Pyrenodesmia ferruginea (Huds.) E.D.Rudolph (1955)

= Blastenia ferruginea =

Species of lichen

Blastenia ferruginea is a species of corticolous (bark-dwelling), crustose lichen in the family Teloschistaceae. It has a cosmopolitan distribution.

== Taxonomy ==
Lichen ferrugineus has a complex taxonomic history characterised by significant nomenclatural changes and taxonomic revisions over the centuries. It was first formally described by botanist William Hudson in 1762, as Lichen ferrugineus. Italian lichenologist Abramo Bartolommeo Massalongo transferred it to the newly circumscribed genus Blastenia in 1852. Massalongo did not propose a type species for the genus, but Frederic Clements and Cornelius Lott Shear designated Blastenia ferruginea as the type in 1931. However, because most contemporary authors treated this taxon as a species of Caloplaca, the genus Blastenia fell into disuse.

For more than 150 years, this lichen species was most commonly known as Caloplaca ferruginea due to its distinctive features, including a grey thallus and dark red apothecia without a thalline margin. This name found its way into numerous scientific publications and major floras. However, in 2017, taxonomic investigations led to the reclassification of Lichen ferrugineus within the resurrected genus Blastenia. The revised nomenclature was supported by a closer examination of Hudson's original description, which revealed similarities to another lichen species known as Bacidia rubella, characterised by its red apothecia (fruiting bodies) and granular thallus.

In light of these taxonomic challenges and to avoid further confusion, Linda in Arcadia and Jan Vondrák put forth a proposal for the conservation of the name Blastenia ferruginea in its traditionally recognised sense. This conservation, according to the authors, would firmly establish the application of the name, preserving the historical usage of Blastenia ferruginea spanning more than a century and a half. As part of the conservation proposal, a recent, well-documented collection of Blastenia ferruginea with typical characteristics has been suggested as the conserved type specimen. This measure aims to provide clarity in the taxonomic naming of this lichen species, which has undergone various interpretations throughout its taxonomic history. In December 2003, the Report of the Nomenclature Committee for Fungi endorsed the conservation of the name Lichen ferrugineus (Blastenia ferruginea), with a conserved type, as proposed. This decision, supported by a 78% vote in favour, aimed to stabilize the application of the name Blastenia ferruginea and prevent potential confusion with the well-known lichen Bacidia rubella. The committee's approval acknowledged the lack of original material for lectotypification and agreed that conservation with a conserved type was the most suitable resolution.

== Description ==
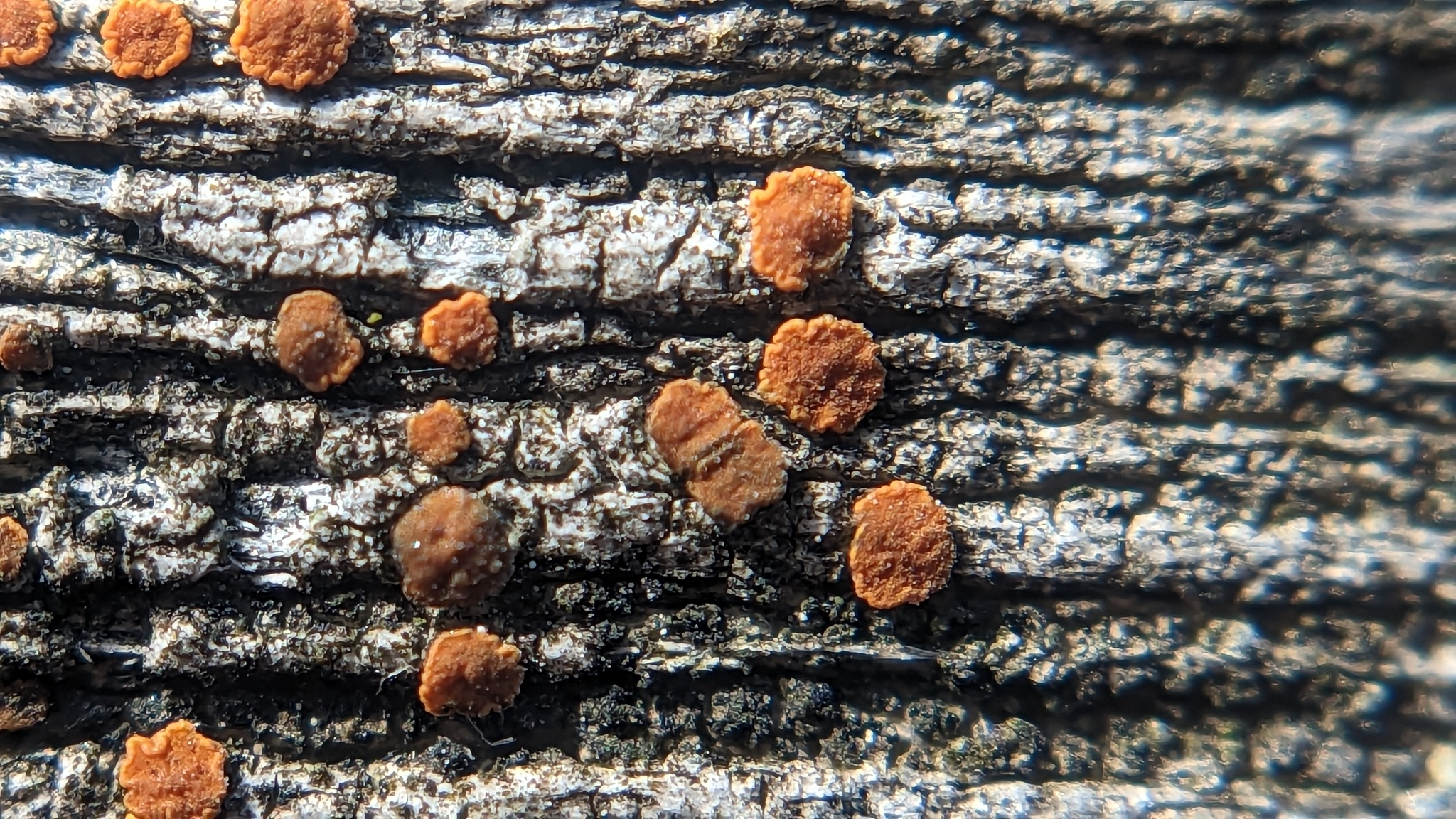
Apothecia

The pale grey to dark grey thallus of Blastenia ferruginea is typically entire or immersed in the host bark, with a thin profile. It has a smooth texture and a white-grey hue, although it can sometimes appear darker. The thallus is K−. The apothecia of Blastenia ferruginea measure 1–2 mm in diameter, and often have a markedly uneven and flexuose margin. They are rust red to reddish brown in colour.

Unlike Blastenia crenularia, the photobiont in B. ferruginea is scanty or absent beneath the hymenium, further distinguishing it from its relative. Blastenia ferruginea can be distinguished from its close relative, B. hungarica, based on the size of their apothecia. While the apothecia of Blastenia ferruginea typically measure between 0.8 and 1.5 mm in diameter, those of B. hungarica are smaller, usually less than 0.6 mm in diameter.

== Habitat and distribution ==
Blastenia ferruginea has a cosmopolitan distribution. It primarily grows on the bark of trees such as Hazel (Corylus), common aspen (Populus tremula), ash (Fraxinus), and Sorbus, and is occasionally found on old timber. In the United Kingdom, it is scarce and appears to be declining, with recent records mostly from Northern and Western Scotland, Western Ireland, and sporadically in Cumbria, Hampshire, and Sussex. It has become rare or extinct in most parts of England, Wales, and Central Europe. In Belgium, it was considered locally extinct because it had not been recorded since 1890, but it was discovered growing on willow (Salix) 120 years later. In Germany, the lichen is thought to have declined significantly in the second half of the twentieth century due to pollution, but as of 2018 appears to be making a comeback. Blastenia ferruginea was recorded as new to tropical Africa in 2005, and had previously been reported from South Africa and from Morocco.
