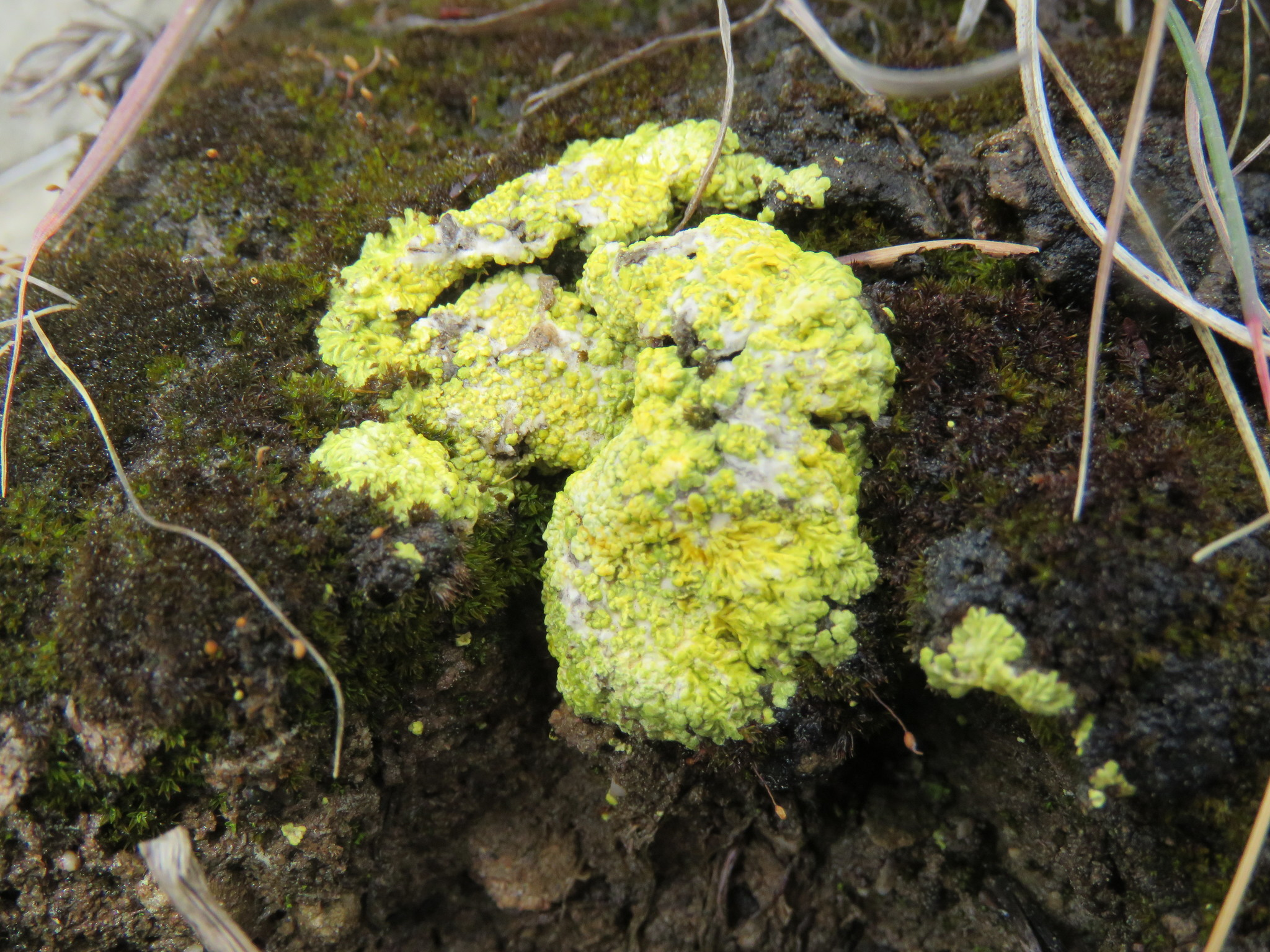

Conservation status
- Secure (NatureServe)

Scientific classification
- Kingdom: Fungi
- Division: Ascomycota
- Class: Lecanoromycetes
- Order: Teloschistales
- Family: Teloschistaceae
- Genus: Gyalolechia
- Species: G. bracteata

Binomial name
- Gyalolechia bracteata (Hoffm.) A.Massal. (1852)

Synonyms
- List: Psora bracteata Hoffm. (1796); Lichen bracteatus (Hoffm.) Ach. (1799); Parmelia fulgens var. bracteata (Hoffm.) Ach. (1803); Lecanora fulgens var. bracteata (Hoffm.) Ach. (1810); Lecanora bracteata (Hoffm.) Röhl. (1813); Lichen fulgens * bracteata (Hoffm.) Lam. (1813); Lichen fulgens var. bracteatus (Hoffm.) Wahlenb. (1826); Parmelia fulgens f. bracteata (Hoffm.) Fr. (1831); Parmelia friabilis var. bracteata (Hoffm.) Schaer. (1840); Biatora fulgens var. bracteata (Hoffm.) Fr. (1845); Lecanora friabilis var. bracteata (Hoffm.) Rabenh. (1845); Amphiloma bracteatum (Hoffm.) Körb. (1855); Berengeria bracteata (Hoffm.) Trevis. (1853); Sporoblastia bracteata (Hoffm.) Trevis. (1856); Placodium bracteatum (Hoffm.) Nyl. (1861); Placodium fulgens subsp. bracteatum (Hoffm.) Nyl. (1861); Lecanora fulgens subsp. bracteata (Hoffm.) Th.Fr. (1871); Psoroma fulgens f. bracteatum (Hoffm.) Arnold (1881); Placodium fulgens f. bracteatum (Hoffm.) Tuck. (1882); Placodium fulgens var. bracteatum (Hoffm.) Müll.Arg. (1892); Caloplaca bracteata (Hoffm.) Jatta (1900); Squamaria bracteata (Hoffm.) H.Olivier (1909); Fulgensia bracteata (Hoffm.) Räsänen (1933); Caloplaca bracteata var. deformis Erichsen (1939); Gyalolechia bracteata subsp. deformis (Erichsen) Hafellner & Türk (2016)

= Gyalolechia bracteata =

Species of lichen

Gyalolechia bracteata, the sulfur lichen, is a species of terricolous (ground-dwelling) lichen in the family Teloschistaceae. It is part of the biological soil crust ecological community in Europe and the United States.

== Taxoomy ==
The species was first described by German lichenologist Georg Franz Hoffmann in 1796, as Psora bracteata. Abramo Bartolommeo Massalongo transferred it to the genus Gyalolechia in 1852. It has had a long taxonomic history, having been shuffled to many genera and sometimes reclassified as varieties or forms of other taxa. It is commonly known as the "sulfur lichen".

== Description ==
Gyalolechia bracteata forms a crust-like growth (thallus) on soil that appears granular or broken into small, island-like patches. The lichen is predominantly orange-yellow in colour, though some areas may appear white where the underlying fungal tissue (hypothallus) shows through. The surface has a frosted or powdery appearance.

Unlike some related species, the edges of the lichen crust do not form distinct finger-like projections or lobes. The lichen commonly produces small, disc-shaped reproductive structures (apothecia) that are orange when fully developed and typically measure around 1 millimetre across. These structures produce microscopic spores that are transparent and single-celled, measuring 11–15 μm long by 5.5–8 μm wide.

== Habitat and distribution ==
In Europe, Gyalolechia bracteata is a rare lichen species found in xerothermic (dry and warm) habitats. In Poland, it has been documented in the Ostnicowe Parowy Gruczna nature reserve along the lower Vistula River, where it forms part of a relict community of terricolous (ground-dwelling) lichens. This community, resembling the Toninio-Psoretum decipientis fulgensietum bracteatae association, survives on eroded sandy slopes isolated from agricultural runoff. G. bracteata is considered vulnerable on Poland's Red List of Threatened Lichens and is strictly protected by law. Its nearest known localities outside Poland are in southern Sweden and southern Poland, indicating a discontinuous continental distribution. The species' survival in this area, along with other rare xerothermic lichens, is attributed to specific habitat conditions that have persisted since early postglacial periods, as well as human activities that maintained open landscapes.

Gyalolechia bracteata can be found across a wide range of elevations throughout the United States, growing in both arctic tundra environments and cool desert landscapes. While this lichen sometimes grows on limestone-rich (calcareous) soils in dry regions, it becomes particularly abundant on gypsum-containing soils, where it forms extensive communities alongside the pink soil lichen Psora decipiens.
