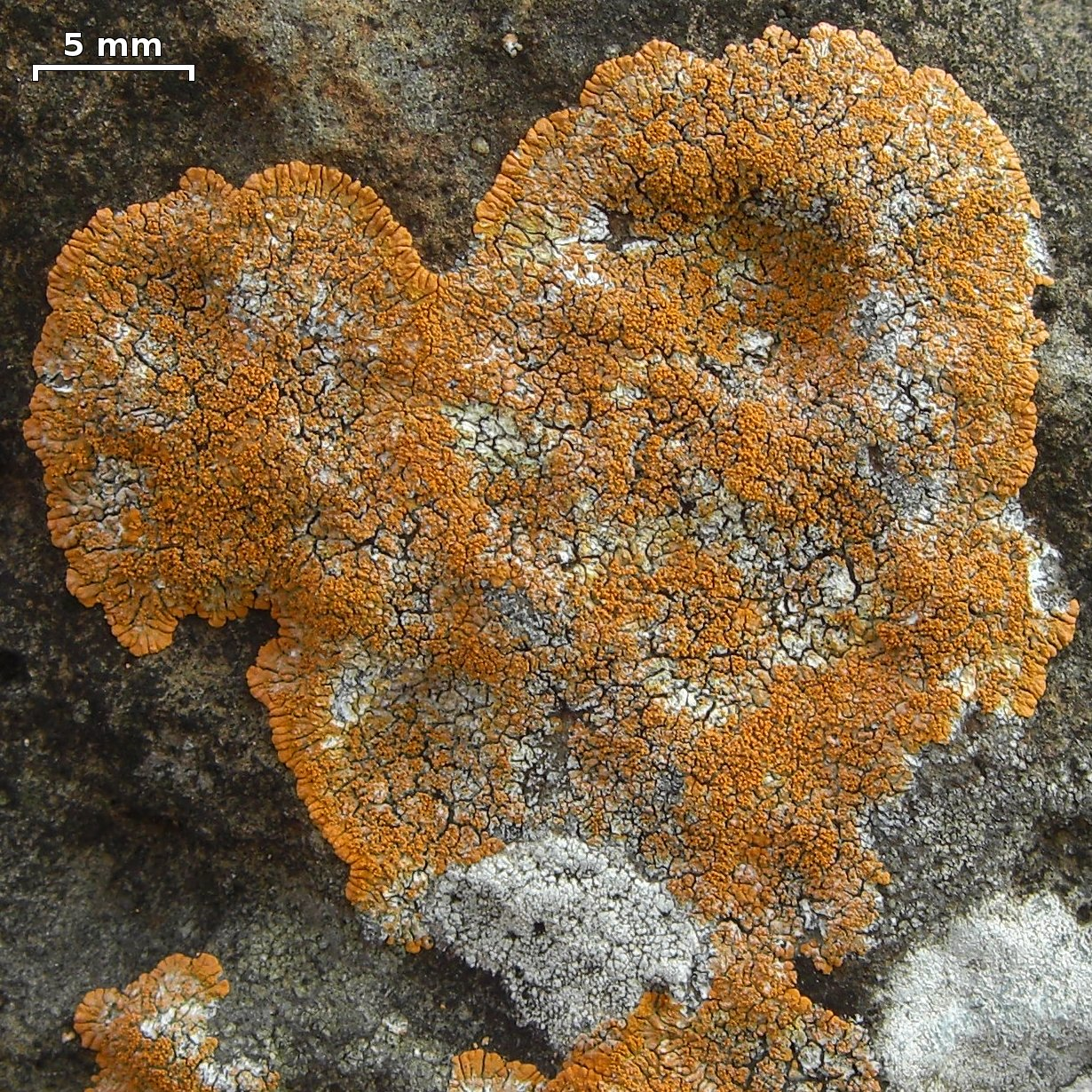
- on basalt, Santa Fe Island, Galápagos

Scientific classification
- Domain: Eukaryota
- Kingdom: Fungi
- Division: Ascomycota
- Class: Lecanoromycetes
- Order: Teloschistales
- Family: Teloschistaceae
- Genus: Wetmoreana
- Species: W. brouardii

Binomial name
- Wetmoreana brouardii (B.de Lesd.) Wilk & Søchting (2020)

Synonyms
- Placodium brouardii B.de Lesd. (1914); Caloplaca brouardii (B.de Lesd.) Zahlbr. (1931); Fulgogasparrea brouardii (B.de Lesd.) S.Y.Kondr. (2015)

= Wetmoreana brouardii =

Species of lichen

Wetmoreana brouardii is a species of saxicolous (rock-dwelling), crustose lichen in the family Teloschistaceae.

== Taxonomy ==
It was first formally described as a new species in 1914 by French lichenologist Maurice Bouly de Lesdain, who classified it in the genus Placodium. In 1931, Alexander Zahlbruckner transferred it to Caloplaca, and it was known as a member of that genus for almost a century. In the 2000s several molecular phylogenetics studies showed that the large genus Caloplaca was polyphyletic, and several smaller genera were circumscribed to more appropriately reflect phylogenetic relationships in the Teloschistaceae. In 2015, Sergey Kondratyuk and colleagues proposed to move Caloplaca brouardii to the genus Fulgogasparrea. Katrina Wilk and Ulrik Søchting transferred it to the genus Wetmoreana in 2020.

== Habitat and distribution ==
The lichen is widely distributed, having been found in Africa, North America, and South America (including the Galápagos Islands).
