= Oxneriopsis =

Scientific classification
- Domain: Eukaryota
- Kingdom: Fungi
- Division: Ascomycota
- Class: Lecanoromycetes
- Order: Teloschistales
- Family: Teloschistaceae
- Genus: Oxneriopsis; S.Y.Kondr., Upreti & Hur (2017)

Type species
- Oxneriopsis oxneri (S.Y.Kondr. & Søchting) S.Y.Kondr., Upreti & Hur (2017)

Genus of lichens

Oxneriopsis is a genus of lichen-forming fungi in the family Teloschistaceae. It has four species of corticolous (bark-dwelling), crustose lichens.

== Taxonomy ==
The genus was circumscribed in 2017 by the lichenologists Sergey Kondratyuk, Dalip Kumar Upreti, and Jae-Seoun Hur, with Oxneriopsis oxneri assigned as the type species. The genus name honours the Ukrainian lichenologist Alfred Mycolayovych Oxner (1898–1973).

== Description ==
Oxneriopsis features crustose lichens with a thallus that can be continuous, cracked, or divided into small, isolated units (areoles). Often, this thallus forms vegetative reproductive structures (propagules), known as phyllidia or schizidia, which are typically bright yellow or greenish-yellow, contrasting with the greyish or greenish-grey background of the main thallus.

Their fruiting bodies (apothecia) vary from lecanorine (with a thalline margin) to zeorine (without a thalline margin), and exhibit a range of colours from yellow and orange-brown to dark brown or even blackish brown. The thalline margin of the apothecia is usually a striking bright yellow. The hymenium, the tissue layer containing the spore-producing asci, is interspersed with oil. Each ascus typically contains eight spores that are polarilocular (having two distinct chambers) and hyaline (translucent). The conidia (asexual spores) of Oxneriopsis are rod-shaped (bacilliform), measuring between 2.5 and 3.5 μm in length and 0.8 to 1 μm in width.

Chemically, the genus is noted for the presence of fragilin in some species, but the chemical composition across all species within the genus is not thoroughly studied.

== Species ==
- Oxneriopsis bassiae (Ach.) S.Y.Kondr., Upreti & Hur (2020)
- Oxneriopsis oxneri (S.Y.Kondr. & Søchting) S.Y.Kondr., Upreti & Hur (2017)
- Oxneriopsis taehaensis S.Y.Kondr., Lőkös & Hur (2019)
- Oxneriopsis yeosuensis S.Y.Kondr., Upreti & Hur (2017)
