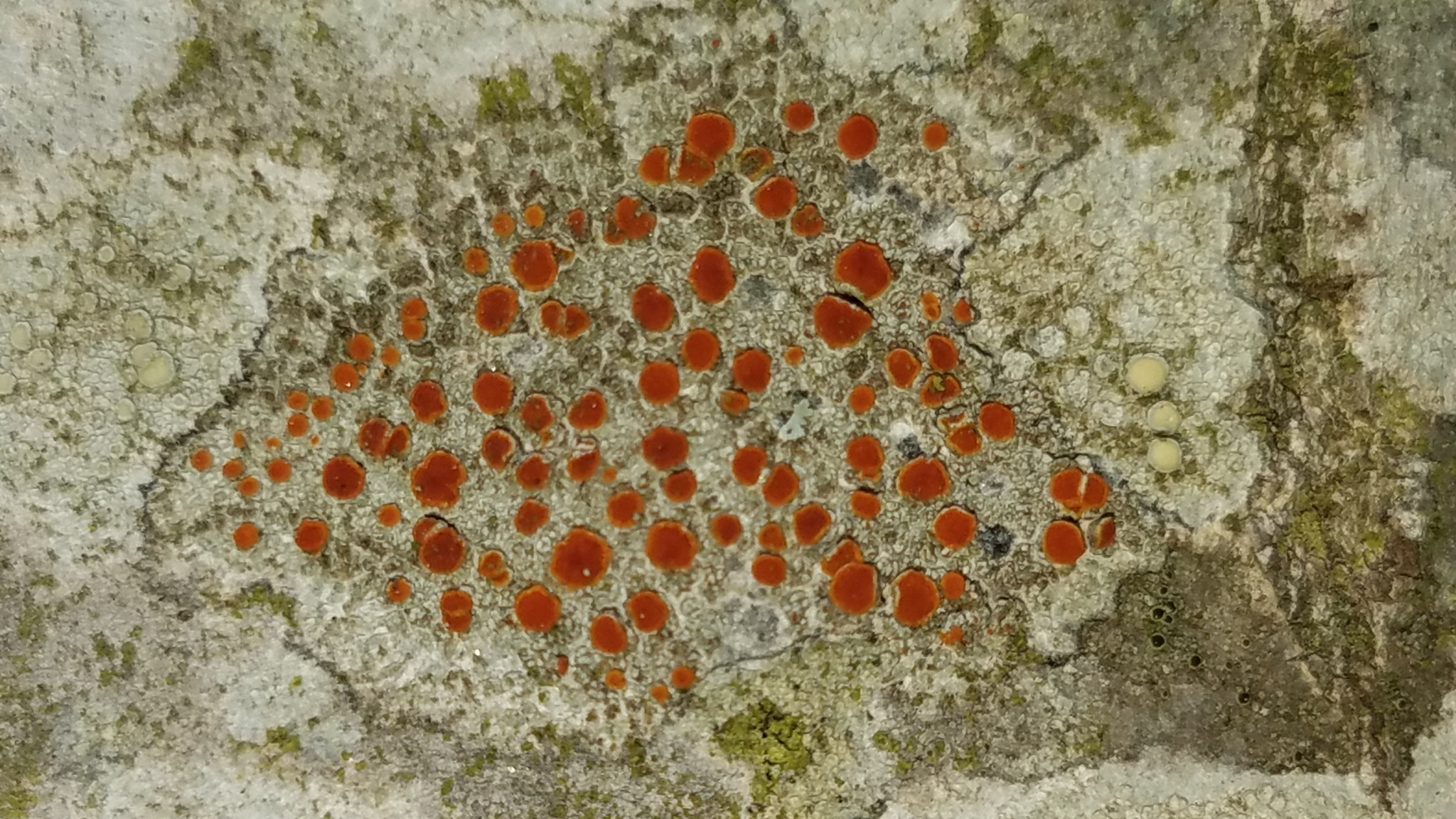
- Blastenia ferruginea

Scientific classification
- Kingdom: Fungi
- Division: Ascomycota
- Class: Lecanoromycetes
- Order: Teloschistales
- Family: Teloschistaceae
- Genus: Blastenia; A.Massal. (1852)

Type species
- Blastenia ferruginea (Huds.) A.Massal. (1852)

= Blastenia =

Genus of lichens

Blastenia is a genus of lichen-forming fungi in the family Teloschistaceae. The genus was established in 1852 by the Italian botanist Abramo Massalongo, who brought together several species that had previously been scattered across different genera. These lichens are characterised by their rust-brown to orange-red fruiting bodies and a thin, crusty growth that often breaks into small plate-like sections. The genus includes around 40 recognised species found primarily in the Mediterranean region and Macaronesia, though some species have spread to other parts of the world.

== Taxonomy ==
The genus was circumscribed in 1852 by Abramo Bartolommeo Massalongo. Massalongo characterised Blastenia by its discoid fruiting bodies with their own proper rim (exciple), the disc coloured rust-brown to saffron-red and often becoming slightly swollen and almost spherical; the apothecia are centrally attached and pressed to the thallus. He described the fertile layer as thin to cartilaginous and set above an algal layer, with club-shaped asci containing four to eight spores and paraphyses that are rather loosely septate but thickened at the tips. The ascospores were said to be ellipsoid, colourless and rounded or slightly tapered at the ends, with two "polar" compartments linked by a thread-like waist—sometimes so thin as to appear to vanish—and surrounded by a very delicate outer wall. The thallus was defined as entirely crustose and closely adherent, either effuse (spreading) or with a more clearly delimited outline, underlain by a faintly fibrous hypothallus. Massalongo also made clear that he was gathering species that had previously been scattered across several broad genera of the day (e.g. Lecidea, Patellaria, Biatora, Parmelia, Placodium, and even Persoon's catch-all Lichen), and giving them a distinct home under Blastenia. He included seven species in his circumscription of the genus, although he did not explicitly designate a type species.

In the absence of an original type, Blastenia ferruginea was designated as the generic type by Clements & Shear (1931). Through much of the 20th century, Blastenia was treated as a synonym of Caloplaca; the genus was reinstated on multi-locus phylogenetic grounds by Arup and colleagues in 2013, who circumscribed a clade close to Gyalolechia within subfamily Caloplacoideae. A three-locus phylogeny (ITS, β-tubulin, mtLSU) resolves Blastenia into six infrageneric groups—Crenularia, Herbidella, Hungarica, Festivella, Psychrophila and Relicta—comprising 24 species and two subspecies recognised with coalescent-based species delimitation. Several lineages show shallow recent splits, whereas the Relicta group appears oldest. The genus itself likely originated in the early Tertiary period, with most diversification dated Miocene–Pleistocene.

== Description ==
Species of Blastenia form thin, crust-like lichens that often break up into a mosaic of small plates (an areolate thallus). The thallus may cover large patches or be reduced to a narrow rim around the fruiting bodies, and ranges from white through dark grey to wholly or partly yellow. A dark marginal prothallus is sometimes present—either as a fine black border or as black zone lines where neighbouring lichens meet. The plates are usually flat when young, but in older growth they can become uneven or slightly domed. In some species the thallus produces minute powdery or wart-like outgrowths (soredia, blastidia or isidia), which are vegetative propagules that help the lichen spread. The outer skin (cortex) is poorly developed or inconspicuous, though a very thin, dead, protective surface layer (an epinecral layer) is often present.

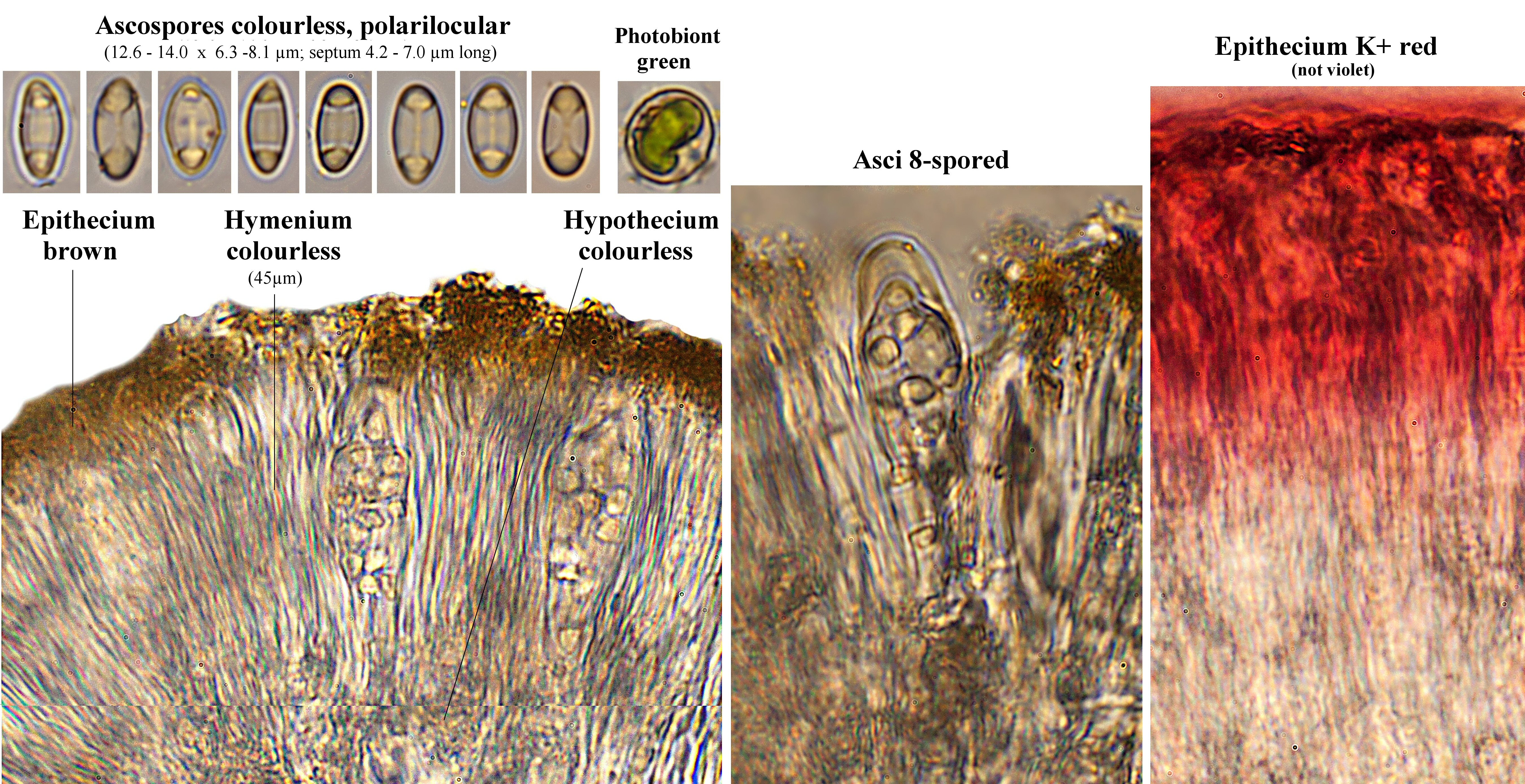
Microscopic characters of Blastenia crenularia

The sexual fruiting bodies (apothecia) sit directly on the thallus (sessile), sometimes with a slightly narrowed base, and are pale orange to deep red, occasionally tending towards blackish. Their rim (the exciple) is thin and matches or is darker than the central disc Under the microscope the top layer of the disc (epithecium) appears granular and crystalline, and the tissue beneath the disc (hypothecium) is often partly yellowish or brownish; in simple spot tests it does not react with potassium hydroxide (K–) but turns orange with nitric acid (N+). The supporting hyphae between the spore sacs (paraphyses) may branch and fuse and are typically swollen at the tips. The spore sacs (asci) are club-shaped and contain eight spores. The spores themselves are colourless, usually ellipsoidal, and polarilocular: each spore is divided by a relatively thick septum into two chambers, one at each end.

Asexual reproduction is common through small flask-like structures (pycnidia) that form low bumps on the thallus; these are sometimes divided into several chambers, and their tips are usually orange to red. They release tiny, rod-shaped conidia. Chemically, Blastenia species contain anthraquinone pigments that give many of them their yellow-orange colours. Two main profiles occur: one dominated by parietin (often with emodin, fallacinal, parietinic acid and teloschistin), and another dominated by 7-chloro-emodin (with emodin, 7-chloro-citreorosein and 7-chloro-emodinal). A green-grey pigment known as cinereorufa-green can be present—subtle and sometimes hard to see—and in section it gives a violet reaction with the N test but none with K (K–, N+ violet); sedifolia-grey pigment is absent.

Three chemotypes occur across the genus. The presumed ancestral state combines non-chlorinated anthraquinones (parietin-based) in the disc with chlorinated derivatives in the exciple; a second state shows secondary reduction of chlorination, whereas a third has chlorinated anthraquinones throughout the apothecia with reduced parietin. These patterns are phylogenetically structured (e.g. consistent in parts of the Hungarica and Crenularia groups).

== Habitat, distribution, and ecology ==
Diversity centres for Blastenia occur in the Mediterranean basin (the western remnant of the Tethys Ocean) and Macaronesia, with multiple groups nested there; long-distance dispersal explains scattered occurrences elsewhere. Epilithic species have constrained ranges tied to suitable siliceous rock, whereas several epiphytic taxa (e.g. B. ammiospila, B. monticola) are widely distributed.

Species are sharply substrate-segregated: most are epiphytic on bark, wood, twigs or plant debris, while seven are consistently epilithic on acidic siliceous rock (rare to absent on limestone). The Hungarica group is twig-specialised and has smaller apothecia; Psychrophila species are cold-adapted, occurring in boreal–montane to arctic–alpine settings.

== Species ==
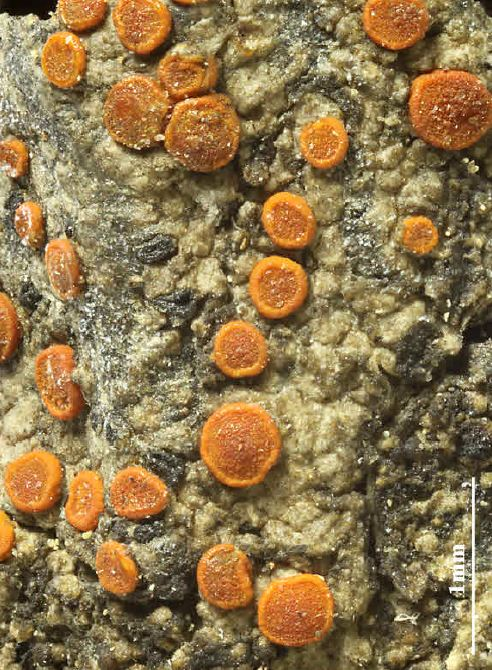
Fruiting bodies of Blastenia hungarica

As of September 2025, Species Fungorum (in the Catalogue of Life) accepts 41 species of Blastenia.

- Blastenia afroalpina Vondrák (2019)
- Blastenia ammiospila (Wahlenb. ex Ach.) Arup, Søchting & Frödén (2013)
- Blastenia allorgei B.de Lesd. (1943)
- Blastenia ammiospila (Wahlenb. ex Ach.) Arup, Søchting & Frödén (2013)
- Blastenia anatolica Halıcı, Arup & Vondrák (2019)
- Blastenia carnella (Nyl.) Müll.Arg. (1889)
- Blastenia catalinae (H.Magn.) E.D.Rudolph (2015)
- Blastenia caucasica I.V.Frolov & Vondrák (2019)
- Blastenia circumpolaris Søchting, Frödén & Arup (2013)
- Blastenia coralliza (Arup & Åkelius) Arup, Søchting & Frödén (2013)
- Blastenia crenularia (With.) Arup, Søchting & Frödén (2013)
- Blastenia crocea (Kremp.) Müll. Arg. (1886)
- Blastenia endochromoides Müll.Arg. (1894)
- Blastenia ferruginea (Huds.) A.Massal. (1852)
- Blastenia festivella (Nyl.) Vondrák (2019)
- Blastenia furfuracea (H.Magn.) Arup, Søchting & Frödén (2013)
- Blastenia gennargentuae Vondrák (2019)
- Blastenia gordejevii Tomin (1926)
- Blastenia guadeloupensis B.de Lesd. (1943)
- Blastenia hungarica (H.Magn.) Arup, Søchting & Frödén (2013)
- Blastenia keroblasta Zahlbr. (1906)
- Blastenia lamii B.de Lesd. (1943)
- Blastenia lauri Vondrák (2019)
- Blastenia macquariensis C.W.Dodge (1968)
- Blastenia monticola Arup & Vondrák (2019)
- Blastenia palmae Vondrák (2019)
- Blastenia peragrata (Fée) Mig. (1952)
- Blastenia personata Hulting (1900)
- Blastenia poliotera (Nyl.) Müll.Arg. (1880)
- Blastenia psychrophila Halıcı & Vondrák (2019)
- Blastenia pulcherrima Müll.Arg. (1888)
- Blastenia purpurea Vondrák (2019)
- Blastenia relicta Arup & Vondrák (2019)
- Blastenia remota Obermayer & Vondrák (2019)
- Blastenia scabrosa (Søchting, Lorentsen & Arup) S.Y. Kondr. & Hur (2014)
- Blastenia sparsa Js.Murray (1963)
- Blastenia subathallina (H.Magn.) Arup & Vondrák (2019)
- Blastenia subochracea (Wedd.) Arup, Søchting & Frödén (2013)
- Blastenia xerothermica Vondrák, Arup & I.V.Frolov (2019)
