= Fulgensia =

Scientific classification
- Kingdom: Fungi
- Division: Ascomycota
- Class: Lecanoromycetes
- Order: Teloschistales
- Family: Teloschistaceae
- Genus: Fulgensia; A.Massal. & De Not. (1853)
- Species: F. vulgaris

Binomial name
- Fulgensia vulgaris A.Massal. & De Not. (1853)

Genus of lichen

Fulgensia is a fungal genus in the family Teloschistaceae. The genus was circumscribed by Abramo Bartolommeo Massalongo and Giuseppe De Notaris in 1853, with Fulgensia vulgaris assigned as the type species. Although the genus has had several species in it at times in its taxonomic history, it is now monotypic, as most of its former species have been transferred to Gyalolechia or other Teloschistaceae genera.
