= Fragilin =

Names
- IUPAC name 2-Chloro-1,8-dihydroxy-3-methoxy-6-methylanthracene-9,10-dione
- Other names 2-Chlorophyscion

Identifiers
CAS Number	2026-19-9
3D model (JSmol)	Interactive image
ChEBI	CHEBI:144155
ChemSpider	28288961
PubChem CID	15559331
UNII	5FI0O7S06V
- InChI: InChI=1S/C16H11ClO5/c1-6-3-7-11(9(18)4-6)15(20)12-8(14(7)19)5-10(22-2)13(17)16(12)21/h3-5,18,21H,1-2H3 Key: RTBAOFRCWWQFHB-UHFFFAOYSA-N
- SMILES: CC1=CC2=C(C(=C1)O)C(=O)C3=C(C(=C(C=C3C2=O)OC)Cl)O

Properties
Chemical formula	C_{16}H_{11}ClO_{5}
Molar mass	318.71 g·mol^{−1}
Melting point	267–268 °C (513–514 °F; 540–541 K)
- Except where otherwise noted, data are given for materials in their standard state (at 25 °C [77 °F], 100 kPa). Infobox references

Fragilin is a chemical compound of the anthraquinone class. It has the molecular formula C_{16}H_{11}ClO_{5} and is a chlorinated derivative of parietin. In 1965, it was reported as a constituent of the lichens Sphaerophorus fragilis and Sphaerophorus coralloides. It has since been found in a variety of other lichens including Nephroma laevigatum, Caloplaca, Xanthoria parietina, and others.
