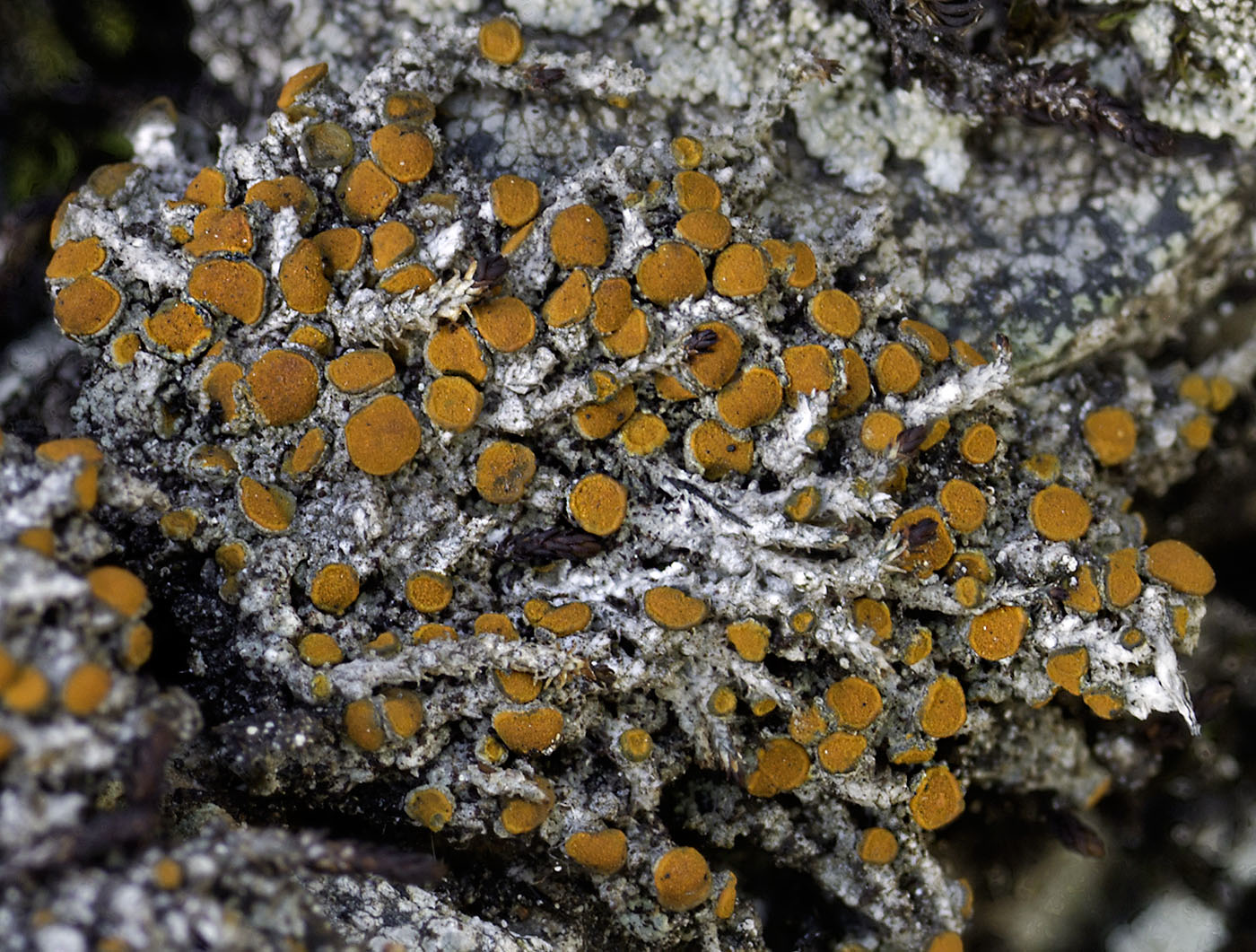
- Lendemeriella nivalis on siliceous rock near Snoqualmie Pass, Washington, USA

Scientific classification
- Kingdom: Fungi
- Division: Ascomycota
- Class: Lecanoromycetes
- Order: Teloschistales
- Family: Teloschistaceae
- Genus: Lendemeriella; S.Y.Kondr. (2020)

Type species
- Lendemeriella reptans (Lendemer & B.P.Hodk.) S.Y.Kondr. (2020)

= Lendemeriella =

Genus of lichen-forming fungi

Lendemeriella is a genus of crustose lichens in the subfamily Caloplacoideae of the family Teloschistaceae. It has ten species. The genus was circumscribed in 2020 by Sergey Kondratyuk, with Lendemeriella reptans assigned as the type species. The genus name honours the American lichenologist James Lendemer, who co-authored the type species in 2012 (as Caloplaca reptans).

Lendemeriella species have an arctic-alpine, boreal-montane, and Mediterranean distribution in the Northern Hemisphere. They grow on twigs, wood, bryophytes, the bark of deciduous trees as well as Siberian fir. They also grow on siliceous and calcareous rock in certain habitats.

== Taxonomy ==
Lendemeriella was circumscribed in 2020 by Sergey Kondratyuk and co-workers during a three-gene phylogenetic survey of the Teloschistaceae. Their analyses showed that material long treated as part of the heterogeneous Caloplaca reptans complex forms a distinct, strongly supported lineage, prompting recognition of a new genus. In the resulting tree Lendemeriella occupies its own branch within the subfamily Caloplacoideae, immediately sister to Olegblumia, Rufoplaca and Usnochroma in the broader Pyrenodesmia sensu lato clade. Lendemeriella reptans was designated as the type species. Its name commemorates the North-American lichenologist James C. Lendemer, whose early molecular work helped to unravel relationships in this group.

Morphologically and chemically Lendemeriella resembles several crustose Teloschistaceae genera but can be separated by its inconspicuous to somewhat squamulose (scaly) thallus, frequent occurrence of apothecia (fruiting bodies), and the presence of a parietin-based pigment suite sometimes accompanied by sedifolia grey or, in L. exsecuta, the violet Lecidea green. Unlike Olegblumia, which lacks apothecia and contains vicanicin-type compounds, Lendemeriella is usually fertile and shows a different secondary metabolite profile; it also differs from Bryoplaca by thallus structure and chemistry, and from Blastenia by its broader ascospore dimensions and poorly developed thallus. These distinctions, together with its unique phylogenetic position, underpin the genus status. Seven species were accepted in the initial circumscription of the genus.

== Description ==
Lendemeriella species form an inconspicuous, crust-like body (the thallus) that adheres tightly to its substrate. The thallus is usually a thin mosaic of small, angular patches (areoles), but in some taxa it breaks up into minute, scale-like flakes (subsquamulose) or becomes so reduced that it is visible only as a pale rim around the fruiting bodies. Colours range from whitish through bluish-grey to grey-brown, often darkening next to the apothecia, and a dark hypothallus is only occasionally present. A few species develop discrete, powdery reproductive pustules (soralia) that begin as surface spots and sink into shallow pits as the powder (soredia) is released. Vegetative propagules are otherwise rare, occurring mainly in L. sorocarpa and L. reptans.

The genus reproduces chiefly through apothecia, which sit flush with or slightly above the thallus. Most apothecia are biatorine—they lack an outer rim of thallus tissue and instead have their own margin, coloured egg-yellow to rusty red, olive or almost black; in some species a thalline margin develops, yielding a lecanorine appearance. The disc itself can be yellow, orange, reddish brown or olive, sometimes with a darker outer edge. Internally, the upper hymenial surface (epihymenium) is dark brown to olive-green, while the filamentous paraphyses branch sparingly and end in one or two slightly swollen tips. Each club-shaped ascus (of the Teloschistes type) contains eight ellipsoid spores with a single, thin cross-wall; in some species the septum is scarcely developed, giving the spores a continuous outline. Asexual spore-forming bodies (conidiomata) are known from only a few members of the genus, where they release slender, rod-like conidia.

Simple spot tests and thin-layer chromatography show that the thallus itself lacks anthraquinone pigments, reacting K− (potassium hydroxide negative) and C− (bleach negative), while the apothecial disc turns red with K and reddish-brown with C. The disc commonly contains the orange pigment parietin together with minor amounts of emodin and related compounds; traces of sedifolia grey may infuse the thallus and apothecial margin in several species, and L. exsecuta additionally incorporates the blue-violet pigment Lecidea green in its cortex. Under the nitrogen test (N), some species yield a violet tint. These chemical signatures, combined with the rather reduced thallus and the colour spectrum of the apothecia, help distinguish Lendemeriella from superficially similar crustose lichens on bark, rock or mossy substrates.

== Species ==
- Lendemeriella aureopruinosa I.V.Frolov, Vondrák, Arup, Konoreva, S.Chesnokov, Yakovczenko & Davydov (2021)
- Lendemeriella borealis (Vain.) S.Y.Kondr. (2020)
- Lendemeriella dakotensis (Wetmore) S.Y.Kondr. (2020)
- Lendemeriella exsecuta (Nyl.) S.Y.Kondr. (2020)
- Lendemeriella kamczatica (Savicz) I.V.Frolov (2025)
- Lendemeriella lucifuga (G.Thor) S.Y.Kondr. (2020)
- Lendemeriella luteoaurantia B.G.Lee 2023 (2020) – South Korea
- Lendemeriella nivalis (Körb.) S.Y.Kondr. (2020)
- Lendemeriella phaeocarpella (Nyl.) I.V.Frolov, Himelbr. & Stepanch. (2025)
- Lendemeriella reptans (Lendemer & B.P.Hodk.) S.Y.Kondr. (2020)
- Lendemeriella sorocarpa (Vain.) S.Y.Kondr. 2020)
- Lendemeriella tornoensis (H.Magn.) S.Y.Kondr. 2020)
- Lendemeriella vaczii Halıcı, Kahraman Yiğit & Güllü (2023) – Antarctica
