= Fauriea =

Scientific classification
- Domain: Eukaryota
- Kingdom: Fungi
- Division: Ascomycota
- Class: Lecanoromycetes
- Order: Teloschistales
- Family: Teloschistaceae
- Genus: Fauriea; S.Y.Kondr., Lőkös & Hur (2016)

Type species
- Fauriea chujaensis (S.Y.Kondr., Lőkös & Hur) S.Y.Kondr., Lőkös, J.Kim, A.S.Kondr., S.O.Oh & Hur (2016)

Species
- F. chujaensis F. jejuensis F. mandshuriaensis F. orientochinensis F. tabidella F. trassii F. yonaguniensis

Genus of lichen-forming fungi

Fauriea is a genus of lichen-forming fungi in the family Teloschistaceae. The genus, which contains seven species, is a member of the subfamily Caloplacoideae.

Characteristics of the genus Fauriea include its crustose, continuous grey to whitish-grey thallus and Lecanora-type apothecia (fruiting structures) with a brown or dark brown disc. The thallus has a sleek, continuous structure that is not areolate, with greyish colours. The apothecia, which initially appear submerged within the thallus, later partially emerge or can be seen in structures called thalline warts.

== Taxonomy ==
Fauriea was circumscribed in 2016 by lichenologists Sergey Kondratyuk, Laszlo Lőkös, and Jae-Seoun Hur, with Fauriea chujaensis assigned as the type species. The genus was named in honour of French botanist Urbain Jean Faurie (1847–1915), who made significant contributions to the collections of lichens, mosses and vascular plants in the Eastern Asian region. In terms of phylogenetics, Fauriea is closely related to the genus Rufoplaca, the Caloplaca furax group, and the newly identified Caloplaca lecapustulata and Caloplaca lecanorocarpa. However, the evidence for this shared relationship is not very strong, except for the clear and strong evidence connecting Rufoplaca with the Caloplaca furax group.

Fauriea was originally was proposed for two species, i.e., the type species F. chujaensis and F. orientochinensis. Several species were proposed for addition to the genus in 2019 and 2020.

== Description ==
Lichens in Fauriea have crustose thalli, which exists as uninterrupted, whole (i.e., not fragmented into areolae) surfaces, with various shades of grey, from muted grey to lead-grey, to whitish grey in certain areas. The disc of the Lecanora-like apothecia, in contrast, are hues of brown to dark brown.

A key characteristic of Fauriea is the form of its apothecia, which initially lie hidden within the thallus, only to semi-emerge or become apparent in thalline warts later on. These apothecia may give the appearance of being lecanorine or sunken into the thallus, which is truly lecanorine. The edges of the thalline margin have a whitish-grey tone, contrasting with the dark brown disc. When the true margin develops completely, it shows a light brown or transparent brown shade.

A cross-section of the Fauriea reveals additional details about its morphology; the true exciple shows a range of tissue structure from scleroplectenchymatous to mesodermatous paraplectenchymatous. The cortical layer of the thalline exciple is purely paraplectenchymatous. The paraphyses, shaped like a broomstick's bristles, branch out at the top, and have a brownish tint.

Inside the asci of the Fauriea, there are eight spores. These ascospores are bipolar, with a narrow ellipsoid form that broadens slightly at the septum. The septum of these ascospores is of medium width. Conidiomata have not been observed in Fauriea.

On a chemical level, both the thallus and epihymenium yield negative results for K spot reactions. Also notable is the absence of anthraquinones (chemical substances common in the Teloschistaceae), contributing to the unique chemistry of the genus.

== Habitat and distribution ==
Fauriea is commonly found on siliceous rocks in the coastal areas, often sharing space with members of Caloplaca and genera such as Lecanora, Ramalina, and Phaeophyscia, or on the bark of pine trees.

Fauriea is macroscopically similar to some Pyrenodesmia species, particularly P. variabilis, but it stands out due to its entire thallus, smaller apothecia, narrower ascospores and a significantly wider ascospore septum. Its absence of a white pruina on apothecial discs and lack of K+ and C+ spot test reactions also sets it apart. The absence of molecular data for 'Caloplaca' atroalba, a North American lichen that shares similar characteristics with Fauriea chujaensis, provides a challenge for further comparative analysis. Additionally, Fauriea chujaensis bears a resemblance to the genus Aspicilia (family Megasporaceae), but the morphology of its ascospores confirms its place within the family Teloschistaceae.

== Species ==
As of October 2023, Species Fungorum (in the Catalogue of Life) accept seven species of Fauriea.

- Fauriea chujaensis (S.Y.Kondr., Lőkös & Hur) S.Y.Kondr., Lőkös, Jung Kim, A.S.Kondr., S.O.Oh & Hur (2016)
- Fauriea jejuensis S.Y.Kondr., Lőkös & Hur (2019) – South Korea
- Fauriea mandshuriaensis (S.Y.Kondr., Lőkös & Hur) S.Y.Kondr. & Yoshik.Yamam. (2020)
- Fauriea orientochinensis S.Y.Kondr., Xin Y.Wang & Hur (2016) – China
- Fauriea tabidella (Nyl.) S.Y.Kondr., Lőkös & Hur (2019)
- Fauriea trassii (Galanina & S.Y.Kondr.) S.Y.Kondr. & Yoshik.Yamam. (2020)
- Fauriea yonaguniensis S.Y.Kondr., M.Moriguchi & Yoshik.Yamam. (2019) – Yonaguni Island, Japan

One taxon that was proposed for inclusion in this genus as Fauriea patwolseleyae (S.Y.Kondr., Jayalal & Hur) S.Y.Kondr. (2019) is now known as Caloplaca patwolseleyae.
