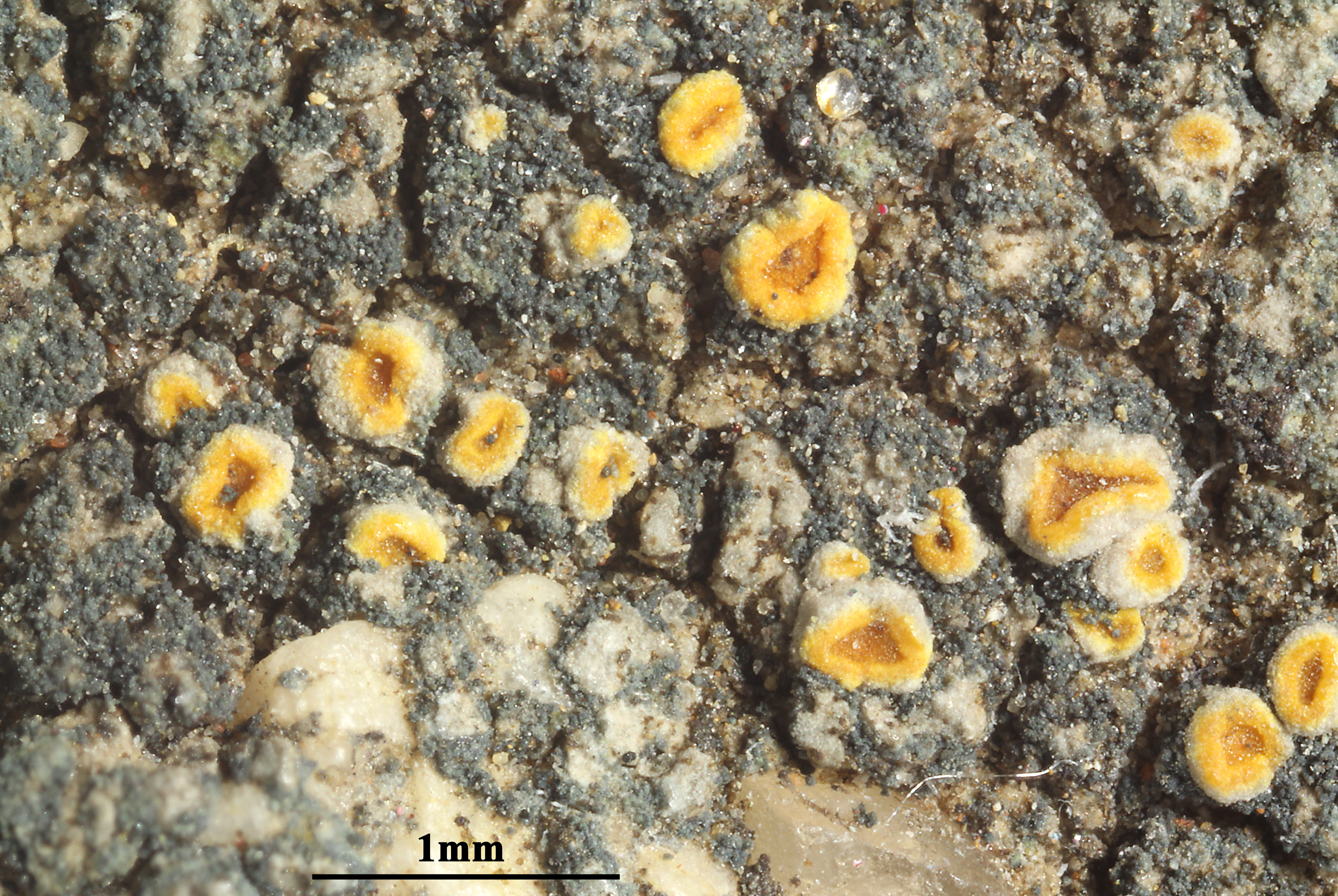
- Image of type specimen

Scientific classification
- Kingdom: Fungi
- Division: Ascomycota
- Class: Lecanoromycetes
- Order: Teloschistales
- Family: Teloschistaceae
- Genus: Kuettlingeria
- Species: K. soralifera

Binomial name
- Kuettlingeria soralifera (Vondrák & Hrouzek) I.V.Frolov, Vondrák & Arup (2020)
- Holotype site: Křivoklát, Czech Republic

Synonyms
- Caloplaca soralifera Vondrák & Hrouzek (2006); Pyrenodesmia soralifera (Vondrák & Hrouzek) S.Y.Kondr. (2020)

= Kuettlingeria soralifera =

Species of lichen-forming fungus

Kuettlingeria soralifera is a saxicolous (rock-dwelling), crustose lichen species in the family Teloschistaceae, first described in 2006. It is similar to Kuettlingeria xerica but distinguished by the presence of soredia on its thallus. The lichen has a grey, often whitish-frosted thallus that produces powdery reproductive granules, and typically grows on artificial substrates such as concrete and asphalt, though it also occurs on natural rock. It is found across Europe, North America, and parts of Asia including Siberia and the Russian Far East.

== Taxonomy ==
Caloplaca soralifera was described by the lichenologists Jan Vondrák and Pavel Hrouzek in 2006. Its species name, soralifera, refers to its distinct feature of producing soredia, which are grey or grey-violet in colour. The type specimen was collected near a small pond in Křivoklát, (Rakovník District, Czech Republic), at an altitude of 348 m (1,142 ft); there, it was found growing on the horizontal side of a concrete wall. Sergey Kondratyuk proposed that the taxon should be transferred to the genus Pyrenodesmia in 2020. Frolov, Vondrák and Arup transferred it to the genus Kuettlingeria in 2020.

== Description ==
This lichen has a crustose, areolate to somewhat squamulose thallus, typically dark to pale grey, and often appears whitish due to pruina. The areoles are flat to convex, measuring 0.2 to 0.8 mm in diameter. It produces dark grey to violet-grey soralia at the margins of the areoles and squamules, which can sometimes cover the entire thallus surface. The cortex of the thallus is greyish to violet-grey, and the algal layer comprises a mixture of algal and fungal cells. The soredia and cortex react positively to various chemical spot tests, indicating the presence of the pigment Sedifolia-grey.

Apothecia, when present, are small, with orange to brown discs and a yellow to orange true exciple. The hymenium is hyaline and contains oil drops. Asci are typically 50 to 80 μm in size, containing polarilocular, hyaline spores.

== Chemistry ==
Unlike most members of the Teloschistaceae, Caloplaca soralifera lacks anthraquinone substances in the thallus. Instead, this species contains the unique pigment Sedifolia-grey, which does not dissolve in acetone and is found in both the cortex and the soredia. This pigment gives the soredia their characteristic grey or grey-violet colouration.

In the apothecia of Caloplaca soralifera, the primary chemical compound is parietin, accounting for a significant percentage of its composition. Parietin is a well-known lichen secondary metabolite, typically associated with bright orange or yellow colours in many lichen species. Additionally, trace amounts of other anthraquinones, such as fragilin, emodin, and emodial, are present in varying concentrations. The presence and proportions of these compounds helps distinguish C. soralifera from closely related species.

This species falls into what is known as chemosyndrome A, as defined in a previous study by Ulrik Søchting. This classification is based on its chemical profile, particularly the dominance of parietin, which is a clear differentiator from species in chemosyndrome B that typically have other anthraquinones as dominant compounds.

== Similar species ==
Caloplaca soralifera shares similarities with several species the Caloplaca, particularly in terms of apothecium structure. The variability in their chemical compositions, particularly the presence or absence of specific compounds like parietin and anthraquinones, plays a role in differentiating them.

Kuettlingeria furax: This species typically produces large lobules on the thallus surface and is delimited by conspicuous marginal lobes. Unlike C. soralifera, K. furax does not produce soredia and is considered a strictly parasitic species on Aspicilia species.

Caloplaca spalatensis: It lacks structures for vegetative dispersal and presents flat areoles. C. spalatensis is found on calcareous bird perching boulders in Mediterranean regions, contrasting with the habitat preference of C. soralifera.

Kuettlingeria xerica: Perhaps the most similar to C. soralifera, K. xerica does not produce soredia. Though morphologically similar, the two species belong to different chemosyndromes, with K. xerica lacking the parietin found in C. soralifera.

Caloplaca chlorina: When sterile, C. soralifera can be confused with C. chlorina. However, C. chlorina usually has a non-pruinose thallus and, when fertile, differs significantly in its lecanorine apothecial margin.

== Habitat, distribution, and ecology ==
Caloplaca soralifera is predominantly found on artificial substrates like asphalt, concrete, and mortar, and occasionally on natural substrates such as calcareous and siliceous rocks. It has been recorded in several European countries, including Austria, Bulgaria, the Czech Republic, Germany, Slovakia, and Romania, growing in exposed horizontal sides of structures. Its recorded elevation range is between 220 and 1,450 m (720 and 4,760 ft). It has also been recorded from North America, Bering Island in the Russian Far East, and from southern Siberia.

This species is often associated with other lichens like Caloplaca crenulatella and Lecanora muralis. Its presence has been increasing in certain areas, possibly due to expanding substrate preferences and climatic changes favouring nitrophilous and basiphilous lichens.
