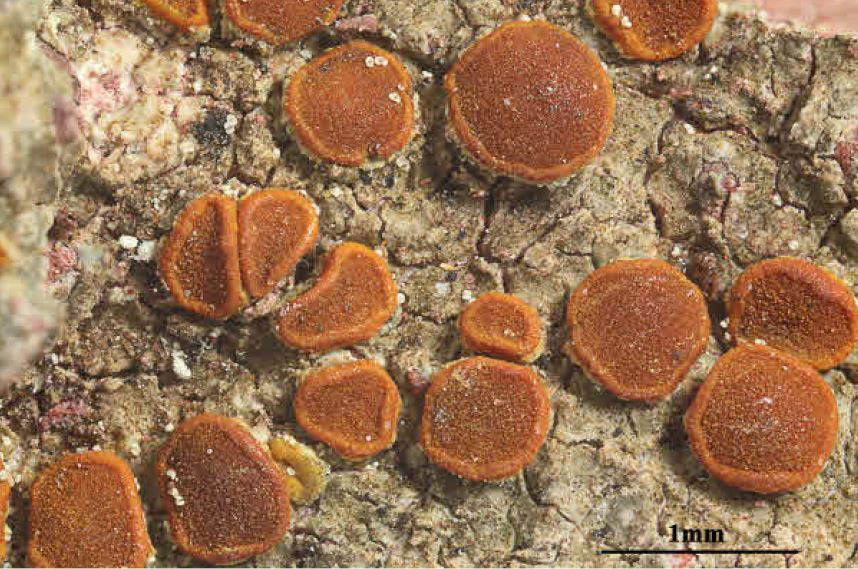
- Growing on volcanic rock in Portugal

Scientific classification
- Kingdom: Fungi
- Division: Ascomycota
- Class: Lecanoromycetes
- Order: Teloschistales
- Family: Teloschistaceae
- Genus: Kuettlingeria
- Species: K. neotaurica

Binomial name
- Kuettlingeria neotaurica (Vondrák, Khodos., Arup & Søchting) I.V.Frolov, Vondrák & Arup (2020)

Synonyms
- Caloplaca neotaurica Vondrák, Khodos., Arup & Søchting (2012); Pyrenodesmia neotaurica (Vondrák, Khodos., Arup & Søchting) S.Y.Kondr. (2020)

= Kuettlingeria neotaurica =

Species of lichen

Kuettlingeria neotaurica is a species of saxicolous (rock-dwelling), crustose lichen in the family Teloschistaceae. Originally described in 2012 from specimens collected on volcanic rock in Ukraine's Crimean Peninsula, this lichen forms thin, dark grey to brown-black crusts and produces small orange-red reproductive structures. It primarily grows on siliceous rock cliffs and outcrops near sea coasts throughout the Mediterranean and Black Sea regions, extending along Europe's Atlantic coast to Great Britain.

== Taxonomy ==
The lichen was first formally described as a new species in 2012 by the lichenologists Jan Vondrák, Alexander Khodosovtsev, Ulf Arup, and Ulrik Søchting; it was initially classified as a member of the genus Caloplaca. The type specimen was collected by the first author from Mount Svyataya (Kara Dag Mountain, Sudak, Ukraine) at an elevation of 320 m (1,050 ft), where it was found growing on volcanic rock. The species epithet alludes to the geographical region where it is commonly found, the Crimean Peninsula. Historically, this area was referred to as "Taurica" by the ancient Greeks and Romans. The name "Caloplaca taurica" had been previously attributed by Mereschkowsky in an informal manner (a nomen nudum), to a species later recognised as Caloplaca inconnexa (Nyl.) Zahlbr. Although this earlier naming was not validly published and thus did not formally restrict the use of the name for the new species, the authors decided not to adopt it for Caloplaca neotaurica, to prevent any potential confusion between the two species, leading to the distinct naming of Caloplaca neotaurica. Sergey Kondratyuk proposed that the species should be in the genus Pyrenodesmia in 2020. It was transferred to the genus Kuettlingeria in 2020.

== Description ==
Kuettlingeria neotaurica is characterised by a thallus (the main lichen body) that typically appears dark grey to brown-black, although it can occasionally have a white, powdery coating (pruina). The thallus is relatively thin, generally not exceeding 150 μm in thickness, and lacks both marginal squamules (small, scale-like structures) and vegetative propagules (reproductive parts that help in dispersal).

The apothecia (reproductive structures where spores are produced) of Kuettlingeria neotaurica are small, with a maximum diameter of about 0.7 mm, and are biatorine in form, meaning they have a flat disc and a clearly distinguishable margin. These apothecia have an orange-red colour, which turns purple when treated with the C spot test (C+ purple). In grey variants of the apothecia, this reaction may not be observed.

The ascospores (spores produced in the asci) of Kuettlingeria neotaurica are approximately 14 to 17 μm wide and 75 to 105 μm long. They typically possess septa (dividing walls within the spore) around 4.0 to 7.5 μm wide. Additionally, the species forms pycnidia, which are small, grey reproductive structures that produce conidia (asexual, non-motile spores). These conidia are ellipsoid in shape and measure about 2.5–3.5 to 1.0 by 1.5 μm.

== Habitat and distribution ==
Kuettlingeria neotaurica predominantly inhabits siliceous rock cliffs, outcrops, and stones located in the proximity of sea coasts. While this species is primarily coastal, it has been occasionally observed inland, specifically in regions like the Peloponnese in Greece and the Rhodope Mountains in Bulgaria. Its geographical distribution encompasses the Mediterranean and the Black Sea coastal areas, with a presence in the Crimean Peninsula. Furthermore, this lichen extends along the Atlantic coast of Europe, including confirmed sightings in Great Britain.

A distinct variation of Kuettlingeria neotaurica, characterised by grey apothecia, has been identified exclusively in limited areas. These unique phenotypes have been recorded only in the Crimean Peninsula, Cyprus, and Greece, indicating a more localised distribution for this particular variant within the species' overall range.
