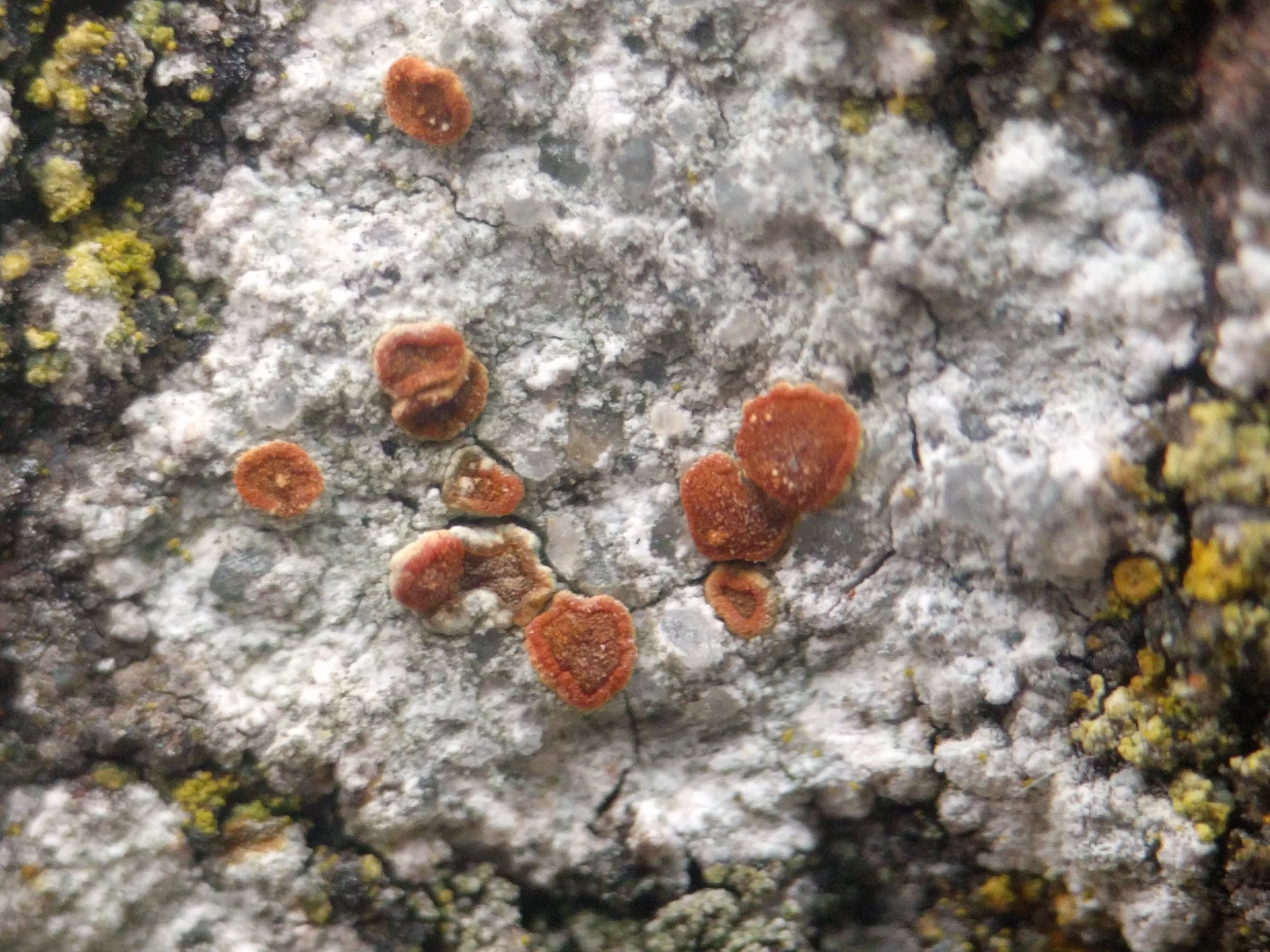

Scientific classification
- Domain: Eukaryota
- Kingdom: Fungi
- Division: Ascomycota
- Class: Lecanoromycetes
- Order: Teloschistales
- Family: Teloschistaceae
- Genus: Kuettlingeria
- Species: K. albolutescens

Binomial name
- Kuettlingeria albolutescens (Nyl.) I.V.Frolov, Vondrák & Arup (2020)

Synonyms
- Lecanora albolutescens Nyl. (1881); Caloplaca albolutescens (Nyl.) H.Olivier (1909); Placodium albolutescens (Nyl.) A.L.Sm. (1918); Callopisma albolutescens (Nyl.) Walt.Watson (1939); Pyrenodesmia albolutescens (Nyl.) S.Y.Kondr. (2020)

= Kuettlingeria albolutescens =

Species of lichen

Kuettlingeria albolutescens is a species of saxicolous (rock-dwelling), crustose lichen in the family Teloschistaceae. It occurs in Europe and Western Asia.

== Taxonomy ==
The lichen was first formally described by the Finnish lichenologist William Nylander in 1881, originally as a member of the genus Lecanora. After having been transferred to several genera in its taxonomic history, it was most recently transferred to Kuettlingeria in 2020.

== Description ==
Kuettlingeria albolutescens has several distinguishing features that set it apart from its close relative, Kuettlingeria teicholyta. This species is characterized by a thallus that is thin and leprose (powdery), spreading out thinly towards the edges without forming the thickened lobes typically seen in Kuettlingeria teicholyta. The surface of the thallus in Kuettlingeria albolutescens does not have a cortex and is irregularly covered with grey soredia, which have a dull violet reaction when tested with a solution of potassium hydroxide (i.e., the K spot test).

Apothecia in Kuettlingeria albolutescens are relatively uncommon but quite noticeable when they do appear. These apothecia can be up to 0.8 mm in diameter and are scattered across the thallus, sometimes crowding together. Initially, they are deeply concave but become flatter over time. The thalline margin is white and wavy; the proper margin of the apothecia is flexuose and swollen, with a bright orange colour. The discs of the apothecia are orange-red-brown and may sometimes be white with pruina.

== Habitat and distribution ==
Kuettlingeria albolutescens grows on calcareous rock, including cement and concrete, and also on bricks and base-rich siliceous rocks. It occurs in Europe and Western Asia.
