= Pisutiella =

Scientific classification
- Domain: Eukaryota
- Kingdom: Fungi
- Division: Ascomycota
- Class: Lecanoromycetes
- Order: Teloschistales
- Family: Teloschistaceae
- Genus: Pisutiella; S.Y.Kondr., Lőkös & Farkas (2020)

Type species
- Pisutiella conversa (Kremp.) S.Y.Kondr., Lőkös & Farkas (2020)

Species
- P. congrediens P. conversa P. grimmiae P. ivanpisutii P. phaeothamnos

Genus of lichens

Pisutiella is a genus of lichen-forming fungi in the family Teloschistaceae. It contains five species of saxicolous (rock-dwelling), crustose lichens that are found in a variety of environments in the Northern Hemisphere.

== Taxonomy ==
The genus was circumscribed in 2020 by lichenologists Sergey Kondratyuk, László Lőkös, and Edit Farkas, with Pisutiella conversa assigned as the type species. This species was originally described in 1861 by August von Krempelhuber as Callopisma conversum, and was later known as a member of the large genus Caloplaca. The genus name was chosen by the authors to honour the Slovak lichenologist Ivan Pišút (1935–2017), "to acknowledge his great contribution to our knowledge on lichens of the Carpathians and in recognition of his general contribution to lichenology".

Pisutiella is in the subfamily Caloplacoideae of the family Teloschistaceae.

== Description ==
The lichen genus Pisutiella features a crustose thallus that varies greatly in appearance depending on the species. It can be well-developed, with a thick, areolate structure ranging in colour from grey to light grey, brownish grey, or blackish grey when found on rock surfaces. In some cases, it presents as distinct, orbicular patches on the thalli of host lichens. The thallus can also be reduced to just a few brown to deep brownish-grey areoles or may be entirely absent, particularly when Pisutiella grows on other lichens. When the thallus of Pisutiella is fully developed it is characteristically thick with a well-formed cortical layer, although it does not produce vegetative diaspores.

The apothecia, or spore-producing structures, of Pisutiella can be lecanorine or zeorine with a margin that matches the colour of the thallus. Over time, this margin may fade. The apothecial discs shows a variety of colours, ranging from dull brownish tones to reddish brown or rusty brown, and they can also be blackish brown. Some species have biatorine apothecia with a distinct yellow-orange margin. These are either immersed or semi-immersed in the thallus. The epihymenium, or the top layer above the hymenium, is a dull yellowish colour.

The asci, the sac-like structures where spores are formed, are clavate (club-shaped) and of the Teloschistes-type, typically containing eight spores each. The ascospores are polaridiblastic and ellipsoid in shape, occasionally with a noticeable swelling at the septum. Conidiomata, which are asexual reproductive structures, follow the Xanthoria type, and the conidia – asexual spores – are widely fusiform or slightly pyriform in shape.

Chemically, the thallus usually does not react to potassium hydroxide (i.e., the K spot test), or in rare instances, the cortical layer may show a light pink reaction. The apothecial disc reacts to potassium hydroxide turning red, while the epihymenium turns purple. While the content of anthraquinone in the apothecial disc is often not investigated, lichen products such as parietin, emodin, and fallacinal have been documented in some Pisutiella species.

== Habitat and distribution ==
The genus Pisutiella can be found across a diverse range of plant communities and ecosystems throughout the Northern Hemisphere's continents. Pisutiella species are found primarily on scattered boulders rich in bases or containing lime in siliceous rocks, and occasionally on dense limestone and dolomite. They also grow on mosses or as lichen dwellers, inhabiting the bodies and fruiting structures of lichens such as Aspicilia epiglypta and various other Aspicilia species, along with Candelariella vitellina, C. coralliza, and other crustose lichen species. These lichens occupy elevations ranging from 600 to 2,200 m (2,000 to 7,200 ft) across various ecological zones, with the exception of damp, non-mountainous environments.

== Species ==
As of November 2023, Species Fungorum (in the Catalogue of Life) accepts five species of Pisutiella:

- Pisutiella congrediens (Nyl.) S.Y.Kondr., Lőkös & Farkas (2020)
- Pisutiella conversa (Kremp.) S.Y.Kondr., Lőkös & Farkas (2020)
- Pisutiella grimmiae (Nyl.) S.Y.Kondr., Lőkös & Farkas (2020)
- Pisutiella ivanpisutii (S.Y.Kondr., Lőkös & Hur) S.Y.Kondr., Lőkös & Farkas (2020)
- Pisutiella phaeothamnos (Kalb & Poelt) S.Y.Kondr., Lőkös & Farkas (2020)

Pisutiella furax (Egea & Llimona) S.Y.Kondr., Lőkös & Farkas (2020) is one species that was originally proposed for inclusion in the genus, but it is now classified in genus Kuettlingeria as Kuettlingeria furax.
