= Pyrenodesmia micromontana =

Scientific classification
- Kingdom: Fungi
- Division: Ascomycota
- Class: Lecanoromycetes
- Order: Teloschistales
- Family: Teloschistaceae
- Genus: Pyrenodesmia
- Species: P. micromontana

Binomial name
- Pyrenodesmia micromontana (Frolov, Wilk & Vondrák) Hafellner & Türk (2016)
- Holotype site: Orenburg, Russia

Synonyms
- Caloplaca micromontana Frolov, Wilk & Vondrák (2016)

Species of lichen

Pyrenodesmia micromontana is a species of saxicolous (rock-dwelling), crustose lichen in the family Teloschistaceae. Found in the Orenburg region of Russia, this species prefers to grow on lime-rich schist and sandstone boulders and pebbles in scrubs and steppes.

== Taxonomy ==
The lichen was first formally described as a new species in 2016 by the lichenologists Ivan Frolov, Karina Wilk, and Jan Vondrák, who initially classified it in the genus Caloplaca. The type specimen was collected in Russia, specifically in the Orenburg region, within the Sakmara district near the village of Grebeni. This location features a shrubby steppe on the southeast slope of the Grebeni hill, west of the village. The specimen was found at an elevation ranging from 120 to 160 m (390 to 520 ft) above sea level, where it was found growing on lime-rich schist and sandstone boulders and pebbles within a scree. Josef Hafellner and Roman Türk transferred the taxon to genus Pyrenodesmia later that year.

== Description ==
The thallus of Pyrenodesmia micromontana is epilithic (growing on the rock surface), typically less than 150 μm thick, and shows no distinct cortex. It is ochre or grey in colour, forming small, roundish spots up to 1 cm in diameter or irregular spots spread over several centimetres. The thallus consists of tightly arranged, angular to rounded, flat areoles. The medulla is inconspicuous, with cells containing extracellular crystals that dissolve and recrystallize in sulfuric acid. The algal layer, composed of spherical cells measuring 11.3–15.0 μm in diameter, is usually about 56–68 μm wide.

Apothecia in Pyrenodesmia micromontana are small, usually less than 0.4 mm in diameter, with a brown to black disc and exciple, and a thalline exciple matching the thallus colour. The hymenium is colourless, occasionally containing crystals. The epihymenium is grey, sometimes with a weak brown tinge.

Chemical spot tests show that the thallus and apothecia are K−, C−, and P−. The uppermost cells in the alveolate cortex of the thallus contain the pigment Sedifolia-grey.

== Distribution and ecology ==
Pyrenodesmia micromontana is found in various European and Asian inland territories, usually in mountainous regions. It grows on limestone, lime-rich schist, and sandstone, often accompanied by lichen species such as Acarospora moenium, Polyozosia dispersa, and Sarcogyne regularis. It does not occur in coastal areas where Pyrenodesmia micromarina is found.
