= Olegblumia =

Scientific classification
- Kingdom: Fungi
- Division: Ascomycota
- Class: Lecanoromycetes
- Order: Teloschistales
- Family: Teloschistaceae
- Genus: Olegblumia; S.Y.Kondr., Lőkös & Hur (2020)
- Species: O. demissa

Binomial name
- Olegblumia demissa (Flot. ex Körb.) S.Y.Kondr., Lőkös, Jung Kim, A.S.Kondr., S.O.Oh & Hur (2020)

Synonyms
- List: Imbricaria demissa Flot. ex Körb. (1855); Placodium demissum (Flot. ex Körb.) Körb. (1859); Parmelia demissa (Flot. ex Körb.) Zwackh (1862); Pannaria demissa (Flot. ex Körb.) Rabenh. (1870); Physcia demissa (Flot. ex Körb.) Zwackh (1883); Lecanora demissa (Flot. ex Körb.) Zahlbr. (1898); Parmularia demissa (Flot. ex Körb.) Croz. (1924); Squamaria demissa (Flot. ex Körb.) Verseghy (1966); Placolecanora demissa (Flot. ex Körb.) Kopach. (1971); Placolecanora demissa (Flot. ex Körb.) Kopach. (1972); Caloplaca demissa (Flot. ex Körb.) Arup & Grube (1999); Olegblumia demissa (Flot. ex Körb.) S.Y.Kondr., Lőkös, Jung Kim, A.S.Kondr., S.O.Oh & Hur (2015); Olegblumia demissa (Flot. ex Körb.) S.Y.Kondr., Lőkös, Jung Kim, A.S.Kondr., S.O.Oh & Hur (2020)

Species of lichen

Olegblumia is a monotypic fungal genus in the family Teloschistaceae. It contains the single species Olegblumia demissa, a saxicolous (rock-dwelling) crustose lichen.

== Taxonomy ==
Genus Olegblumia was first circumscribed in 2015 by lichenologists Sergey Kondratyuk, Laszlo Lőkös, and Jae-Seoun Hur. However, the name was not validly published according to the rules of botanical nomenclature as set out in the International Code of Nomenclature for algae, fungi, and plants. The name was validly published by the same authors in 2020. The genus name honours Ukrainian lichenologist Oleg Blum. In molecular phylogenetic analysis, Olegblumia is a sister group to the genus Usnochroma.

== Description ==
Genus Olegblumia is characterized by a lobate thallus that typically forms a distinct, rosette-like shape. The colour of the upper surface of the lichen ranges from brown to brownish-grey. Its lobes are flat to slightly convex and are quite narrow. Soralia, the reproductive structures where soredia are produced, are found on the laminal surface and are noteworthy for their convex shape and highly uplifted soredious mass, which bears a brownish hue. The soredia themselves are irregularly rounded with a colouration that varies from brown to brownish-green. Chemically, Olegblumia contains the lichen products vicanicin and caloploicin.

== Habitat and distribution ==
Found in Europe and North America, Olegblumia demissa grows on siliceous rocks, typically on vertical and inclined surfaces. Aspicilia contorta is a frequent lichen associate.
