= Lendemeriella nivalis =

Scientific classification
- Kingdom: Fungi
- Division: Ascomycota
- Class: Lecanoromycetes
- Order: Teloschistales
- Family: Teloschistaceae
- Genus: Lendemeriella
- Species: L. nivalis

Binomial name
- Lendemeriella nivalis (Körb.) S.Y.Kondr. (2020)

Synonyms
- List: Zeora nivalis Körb. (1853); Gyalolechia nivalis (Körb.) A.Massal. (1853); Callopisma nivale (Körb.) Körb. (1855); Sporoblastia nivalis (Körb.) Trevis. (1856); Biatorina nivalis (Körb.) Th.Fr. (1861); Lecanora nivalis (Körb.) Nyl. (1866); Caloplaca nivalis (Körb.) Th.Fr. (1871); Placodium nivale (Körb.) Tuck. (1882); Caloplaca pyracea var. nivalis (Körb.) Boistel (1903); Candelariella nivalis (Körb.) Lettau (1912)

Species of lichen-forming fungus

Lendemeriella nivalis is a species of muscicolous (moss-dwelling), crustose lichen in the family Teloschistaceae. It can be found in various cold-climate locations including Greenland, Svalbard, Ukraine, and throughout mid to high latitudes of the Northern Hemisphere. First discovered and described in 1853, this organism forms a thin, skin-like or granular crust that ranges from pale to dark grey in colour as it spreads over its moss host. The lichen's reproductive structures (apothecia) appear as small, round discs measuring up to 0.7 millimetres across, featuring a distinctive combination of orange and grey colouration with an outer grey rim containing algal cells and an inner orange border. Over its long scientific history, this species has been reclassified numerous times and known by at least ten different scientific names before receiving its current designation in 2020.

== Taxonomy ==
It was first formally described as a new species in 1853 by the German lichenologist Gustav Wilhelm Körber, who called it Zeora nivalis. Sergey Kondratyuk transferred it to the newly proposed genus Lendemeriella in 2020.

== Description ==
Lendemeriella nivalis is characterized by its spreading (effuse), finely granular thallus that ranges from light to darkish grey in colour. When tested with potassium hydroxide solution (K), the thallus shows no colour change. The reproductive structures (apothecia) measure 0.2–0.75 mm in diameter and are initially flat before becoming convex with age. These apothecia display distinctive colouration ranging from orange-brown or orange to olive. The outer rim of the apothecium consists of a granular thalline margin (containing algal cells) that gradually disappears as the structure matures, while the proper margin (the inner rim) remains entire and develops a blackish colouration.

Internally, the spore-producing layer (hymenium) is approximately 80 μm high. The sterile filaments (paraphyses) within this layer are slender, measuring about 1 μm in thickness, and are either simple or forked (furcate). These paraphyses show minimal enlargement at their tips, are divided by cross-walls (septate), and frequently display a slightly beaded appearance (somewhat moniliform) in their upper portions. The spore-containing sacs (asci) are club-shaped (clavate) and measure 70–80 by 20 μm.

A distinct feature of L. nivalis is its large ascospores, which are either simple or show a slight, narrow thickening in the middle region (median zone). These spores measure 24–38 by 5–7 μm and have an elongated elliptical (elongate-ellipsoid) or spindle-like (fusiform) shape.

== Habitat and distribution ==
Lendemeriella nivalis occurs in northern and central Europe, and North America. It has also been recorded from Greenland, Svalbard, Ukraine, and the Russian Far East. Its distribution broadly encompasses mid to high latitudes. It grows on tufts on living mosses, especially from the genera Andreaea and Grimmia.
