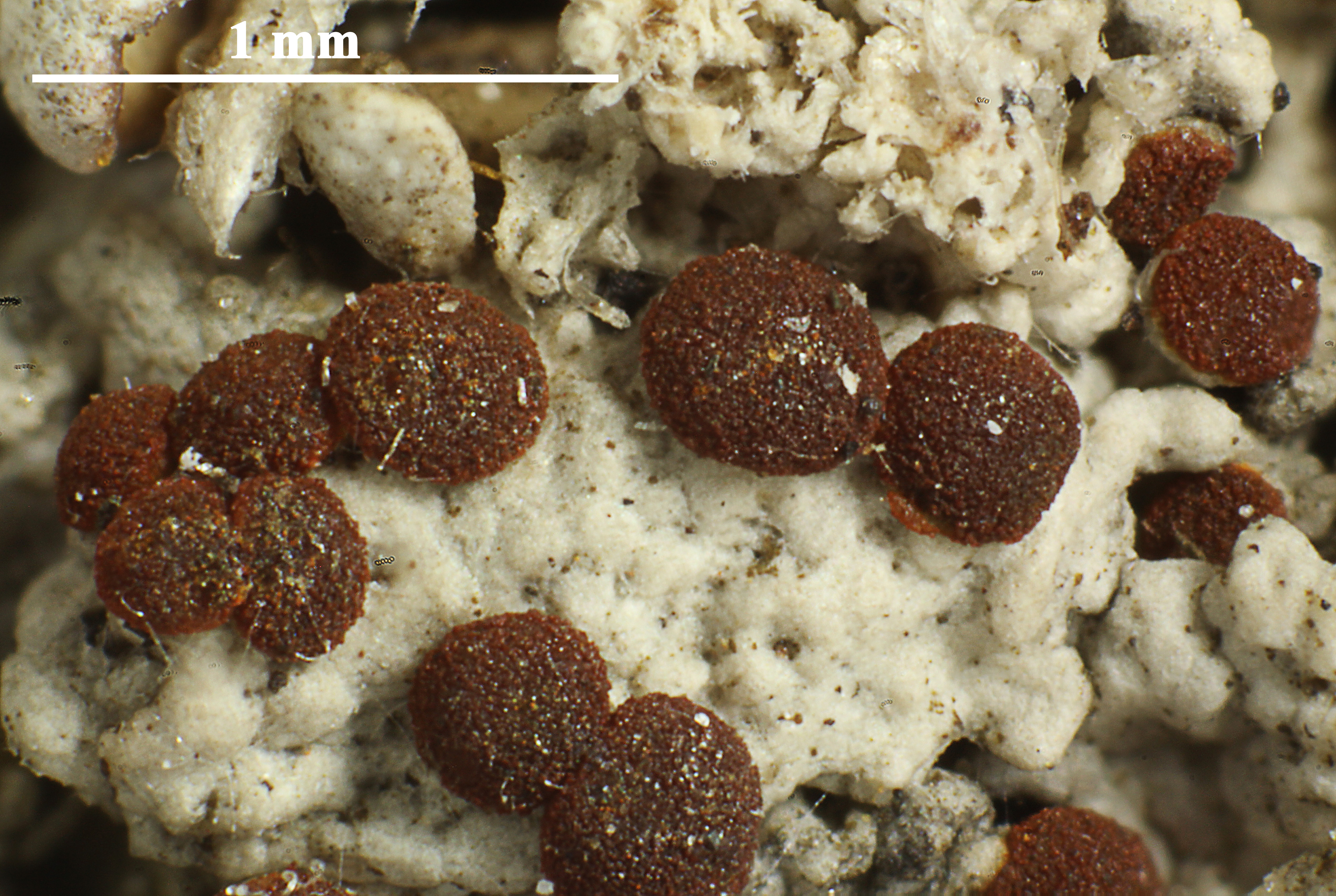
- Closeup of the apothecia of Byroplaca sinapisperma

Scientific classification
- Kingdom: Fungi
- Division: Ascomycota
- Class: Lecanoromycetes
- Order: Teloschistales
- Family: Teloschistaceae
- Genus: Bryoplaca; Søchting, Frödén & Arup (2013)

Type species
- Bryoplaca sinapisperma (DC.) Søchting, Frödén & Arup 2013

Species
- B. jungermanniae B. sinapisperma B. tetraspora

= Bryoplaca =

Genus of lichen-forming fungi

Bryoplaca is a small genus of lichen-forming fungi belonging to the family Teloschistaceae. Established in 2013 by Ulrik Søchting, Patrik Frödén and Ulf Arup, this small genus comprises just three species that specialise in growing on moss-covered substrates in cold regions of the Northern Hemisphere. These lichens are distinguished by their bright orange fruiting discs that stand out like tiny sunbursts against the mossy cushions they inhabit, earning the genus its name which literally means 'moss-plate'.

== Taxonomy ==
Bryoplaca was erected in 2013 by Ulrik Søchting, Patrik Fröden and Ulf Arup to accommodate three northern taxa that had long been shuffled between Lecanora, Blastenia and related groups. The type species, Bryoplaca sinapisperma, was originally described in 1813 by Jean-Baptiste Lamarck as Lichen sinapispermus. Molecular data show the clade to be well isolated within the Teloschistaceae; its nearest relatives remain uncertain, but it is genetically distinct from the superficially similar Blastenia. The genus is small, currently comprising three species, all of which share a preference for bryophyte-covered substrates in cold regions.

== Description ==
The thallus is crustose, sometimes little more than a thin grey-to-white film that lacks the yellow-orange anthraquinone pigments common in many Teloschistaceae. Because the fungal layer (cortex) is poorly developed and amorphous, the surface often merges almost imperceptibly with the underlying moss or plant debris. Sexual structures are apothecia that range from zeorine (with a narrow algal rim) to biatorine (rim formed only by fungal tissue). These discs stand out sharply in the field: they are bright orange when fresh, ageing to a rusty brown, and often dot the host moss like tiny sunbursts.

Microscopically, the genus produces eight simple, colourless ascospores per ascus; in B. tetraspora the number is reduced to four but the spores are correspondingly larger. Secondary metabolites concentrate chiefly in the apothecia, where citreorosein and various emodin derivatives provide the intense colouring, while the thallus may contain traces of atranorin. No pycnidia (flask-shaped asexual organs) have been observed to occur in the genus.

== Habitat and distribution ==
Species of Bryoplaca are arctic–alpine specialists of the Northern Hemisphere, with outliers reported from maritime Antarctica. They colonise sheltered carpets of mosses or decaying herbaceous litter on moist, acidic soils, often where snow lies late or where meltwater keeps the microhabitat cool. This bryophilous lifestyle allows the lichens to exploit niches that are too unstable or nutrient-rich for typical rock-dwelling crusts, and it explains their spotty but wide circumpolar distribution from high mountains to polar coastal barrens.

== Species ==
- Bryoplaca jungermanniae (Vahl) Søchting, Frödén & Arup (2013)
- Bryoplaca sinapisperma (DC.) Søchting, Frödén & Arup (2013)
- Bryoplaca tetraspora (Nyl.) Søchting, Frödén & Arup (2013)
