= Fauriea trassii =

Scientific classification
- Kingdom: Fungi
- Division: Ascomycota
- Class: Lecanoromycetes
- Order: Teloschistales
- Family: Teloschistaceae
- Genus: Fauriea
- Species: F. trassii

Binomial name
- Fauriea trassii (Galanina & S.Y.Kondr.) S.Y.Kondr. & Yoshik.Yamam. (2020)
- Holotype site: Kiewka settlement, Russian Far East

Synonyms
- Caloplaca trassii Galanina & S.Y.Kondr. (2011)

Species of lichen

Fauriea trassii is a lichen species in the family Teloschistaceae, described in 2011. It is primarily found in the Far East of Russia, particularly in the Primorsky Krai region.

== Taxonomy ==
Fauriea trassii was identified and formally description by the lichenologists Irina Galanina and Sergey Kondratyuk. The type specimen was collected by the first author near the Kiewka settlement in the Lazo district in a Quercus mongolica forest. The species is named in honour of Estonian lichenologist and phytosociologist Hans Trass, acknowledging his contributions to the knowledge of Eurasian lichens and plant communities. The taxon was transferred to the genus Fauriea in 2020 by Kondratyuk and Yoshikazu Yamamoto.

== Description ==
The thallus of Fauriea trassii ranges from 5–10 mm in width, with a somewhat uneven surface, and can have highly elevated verrucae. The thallus is dark grey or brownish-grey, and each verruca typically houses 3–5 apothecia. The hypothallus is usually not visible, but a black line may be present when bordering other crustose lichens.

Apothecia are 0.3–0.7 mm in diameter and about 0.17 mm thick. They are usually immersed in thalline verrucae, later becoming sessile and lecanorine with a grey or brownish-grey margin. The disc of the apothecia is brown to dark brown or cherry-blossom brown. The thalline exciple is up to 72 μm wide, and the true exciple is 24–36 μm wide in the upper portion, thinning out towards the base. The hymenium is 70–80 μm high, and the epihymenium is brownish or dirty yellowish-brown. Ascospores have an elongated ellipsoidal shape, and typically measure 12–17 by 5.5–7.5 μm.

The thallus and epihymenium of Fauriea trassii do not react to the potassium hydroxide (K) spot test, or show a greenish-brown reaction that becomes paler over time.

== Similar species ==
Fauriea trassii is distinguished from similar species like Parvoplaca suspiciosa and Caloplaca diphasia by features such as its thinner cortical layer in the thalline exciple, paraphyses of uniform thickness, longer ascospores, and the absence of an algal layer below the apothecium. It also differs from Caloplaca brunneola, Obscuroplaca camptidia, Obscuroplaca ochrolechioides, and Caloplaca yammeraensis by various morphological traits. Additionally, F. trassii is superficially similar to Lecanora subfusca group species but can be differentiated by spore morphology and measurements.

== Habitat and distribution ==
Fauriea trassii is known from several locations in the Far East of Russia. It is thought to be more common than previously recognized, having been often mistaken for a species of Lecanora. This species grows on the bark of Quercus mongolica trees, commonly found about 1.5 km (0.93 mi) from the sea shore in the Primorsky region.
