= Pyrenodesmia erodens =

Scientific classification
- Domain: Eukaryota
- Kingdom: Fungi
- Division: Ascomycota
- Class: Lecanoromycetes
- Order: Teloschistales
- Family: Teloschistaceae
- Genus: Pyrenodesmia
- Species: P. erodens

Binomial name
- Pyrenodesmia erodens (Tretiach, Pinna & Grube) Søchting, Arup & Frödén (2013)

Synonyms
- Caloplaca erodens Tretiach (2003)

Species of lichen

Pyrenodesmia erodens is a species of crustose lichen in the family Teloschistaceae. Found in Italy, the lichen was first described in 2003 as a member of the genus Caloplaca. It was reclassified in the genus Pyrenodesmia in 2013 as part of a larger molecular phylogenetics-informed reorganization of the Teloschistaceae.
