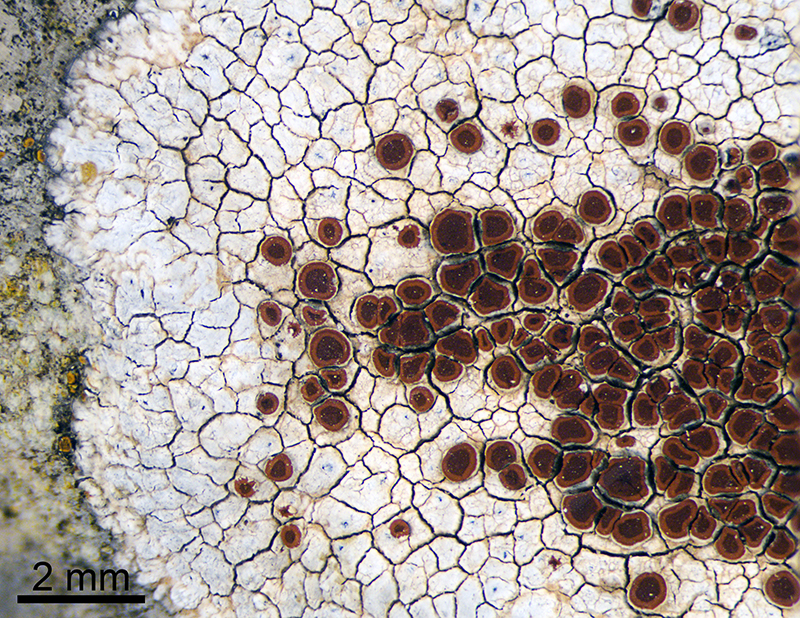

Scientific classification
- Domain: Eukaryota
- Kingdom: Fungi
- Division: Ascomycota
- Class: Lecanoromycetes
- Order: Teloschistales
- Family: Teloschistaceae
- Genus: Kuettlingeria
- Species: K. erythrocarpa

Binomial name
- Kuettlingeria erythrocarpa (Pers.) I.V.Frolov, Vondrák & Arup (2020)

Synonyms
- List: Patellaria erythrocarpa Pers. (1810); Lichen peltatus * erythrocarpa (Pers.) Lam. (1813); Parmelia erythrocarpia (Pers.) Fr. (1831); Lecanora erythrocarpa (Pers.) Link (1833); Biatora erythrocarpa (Pers.) Fr. (1845); Gasparrinia erythrocarpa (Pers.) Tornab. (1848); Zeora erythrocarpa (Pers.) Flot. (1849); Blastenia erythrocarpa (Pers.) Körb. (1855); Placodium erythrocarpum (Pers.) Anzi (1862); Caloplaca erythrocarpa (Pers.) Zwackh (1862); Callopisma erythrocarpum (Pers.) Stein (1879); Pyrenodesmia erythrocarpa (Pers.) S.Y.Kondr. (2020); Caloplaca lallavei f. fulva Szatala (1974)

= Kuettlingeria erythrocarpa =

Species of lichen

Kuettlingeria erythrocarpa is a species of saxicolous (rock-dwelling), crustose lichen in the family Teloschistaceae.

== Taxonomy ==
It was first scientifically described as a new species in 1810 by the mycologist Christiaan Hendrik Persoon, who named it Patellaria erythrocarpa. The taxon has been shuffled to several genera in its taxonomic history, although it has most commonly been considered a member of the genus Caloplaca before molecular phylogenetics showed that this large genus was polyphyletic. In 2020, lichenologists Ivan Frolov, Jan Vondrák, and Ulf Arup transferred the taxon to the genus Kuettlingeria.

== Habitat and distribution ==
Kuettlingeria erythrocarpa is predominantly found in the Mediterranean region and extends into the warmer areas of the sub-Mediterranean belt. This species typically colonizes calcareous substrates such as limestone, dolomite, and calcareous sandstone, and is less frequently observed on man-made materials like mortar and brick. It favours horizontal to slightly inclined surfaces that receive rainfall, thriving particularly in natural habitats at lower elevations. The lichen has also been recorded from Armenia, Iraq, and Israel. In general, the frequency of this species is common in the Mediterranean region and rare in the Saharo-Arabian region.

== Chemistry ==
Emodin is an anthraquinone compound that occurs in Kuettlingeria erythrocarpa.
