= Lendemeriella aureopruinosa =

Scientific classification
- Domain: Eukaryota
- Kingdom: Fungi
- Division: Ascomycota
- Class: Lecanoromycetes
- Order: Teloschistales
- Family: Teloschistaceae
- Genus: Lendemeriella
- Species: L. aureopruinosa

Binomial name
- Lendemeriella aureopruinosa I.V.Frolov, Vondrák, Arup, Konoreva, S.Chesnokov, Yakovczenko & Davydov (2021)

Species of lichen

Lendemeriella aureopruinosa is a species of crustose lichen in the family Teloschistaceae. Found in the Russian Far East, it was formally described as a new species in 2021 by Ivan Frolov, Jan Vondrák, Ulf Arup, Liudmila Konoreva, and Sergey Chesnokov, Lidia Yakovchenko, and Evgeny Davydov. The type specimen was collected on the banks of River Bes-Yuryakh (Yllymakh, Republic of Sakha); here it was found growing on siliceous outcrops in a forest comprising largely birch, alder, and larch trees. The thallus of the lichen ranges in form from an inconspicuous grey film to a more well-developed crust or areoles. Its apothecia measure 0.3–0.6 mm in diameter and have a dark-orange to brick-red coloured disc. Secondary chemicals detected in the lichen (using high-performance liquid chromatography) include parietin, parietinic acid, emodin, teloschistin, and fallacinal. The specific epithet aureopruinosa refers to the bright gold-coloured pruina that is found on young apothecia.
