= Pyrenodesmia tianshanensis =

Scientific classification
- Kingdom: Fungi
- Division: Ascomycota
- Class: Lecanoromycetes
- Order: Teloschistales
- Family: Teloschistaceae
- Genus: Pyrenodesmia
- Species: P. tianshanensis

Binomial name
- Pyrenodesmia tianshanensis (Xahidin, A.Abbas & J.C.Wei) I.V.Frolov & Vondrák (2020)

Synonyms
- Caloplaca tianshanensis Xahidin, A.Abbas & J.C.Wei (2011)

Species of lichen-forming fungus

Pyrenodesmia tianshanensis is a species of saxicolous (rock-dwelling) crustose lichen in the family Teloschistaceae. It forms a yellowish-brown crust broken into many small, raised patches, each typically bearing a single dark brown to black fruiting body. The species was originally described in 2011 under the name Caloplaca tianshanensis and was transferred to Pyrenodesmia in 2020. It is known only from limestone in the Tian Shan Mountains of Xinjiang in northwestern China.

== Taxonomy ==
Caloplaca tianshanensis was described as a new species by Hurnisa Xahidin, Abdulla Abbas and Jiang-Chun Wei from material collected in the Tian Shan Mountains of Xinjiang, north-western China, and was placed in Caloplaca subgenus Pyrenodesmia. The species epithet refers to the type locality.

The description was based on a combination of morphology, anatomy, chemistry and DNA data from nuclear ribosomal internal transcribed spacer (ITS) sequences. In the authors' ITS phylogeny, C. tianshanensis grouped with other Pyrenodesmia species, but formed its own well-supported lineage among the sampled taxa. The new species was compared with morphologically similar taxa, including Caloplaca peliophylla and Caloplaca transcaspica (both now in Pyrenodesmia), from which it differs by a mix of thallus characters, apothecial features, microscopic measurements, and chemistry. Caloplaca tianshanensis was transferred to the genus Pyrenodesmia in 2020 as part of a molecular phylogenetics-informed reorganization of the genus and its relatives in the Teloschistaceae.

== Description ==
The thallus of Pyrenodesmia tianshanensis is crustose and strongly areolate (broken into many small patches called areoles), forming colonies about 2–11 cm across. It consists of numerous peltate areoles, typically 0.7–3 mm wide and 0.4–0.6 mm thick, and is yellowish brown with conspicuous cracks. A very thin, whitish-grey to light grey prothallus may be present at the margins. In section, the upper cortex is well developed and paraplectenchymatous (50–175 μm thick), while the algal layer is discontinuous.

The apothecia are dark brown to black and usually develop one per areole (sometimes more). They are round to irregular, 0.8–1 mm across, immersed to somewhat prominent, and zeorine (showing both a thalline and a proper margin). The disc is typically black, concave and shiny, sometimes with a thin whitish pruina. Internally, the hymenium is 75–115 μm thick, the paraphyses have "beaded" tips (2–5 swollen terminal cells), and the asci contain eight polarilocular spores that are broadly ellipsoid and measure 12–18 × 5–9 μm. Conidiomata were not observed. Spot tests are negative (upper cortex K−, C−; epihymenium K−), but thin-layer chromatography detected two unidentified compounds with distinct retardation factor (R_{F}) patterns in standard solvent systems used in chromatography.

== Habitat and distribution ==
The species is known from the type collection in the Miaoergou area of Mt. Nan-shan in the Tian Shan mountain chain, Xinjiang, where it was found growing on limestone at about 1,280 m elevation. It was collected in April 2009, and (as originally reported) remains known only from this locality.
