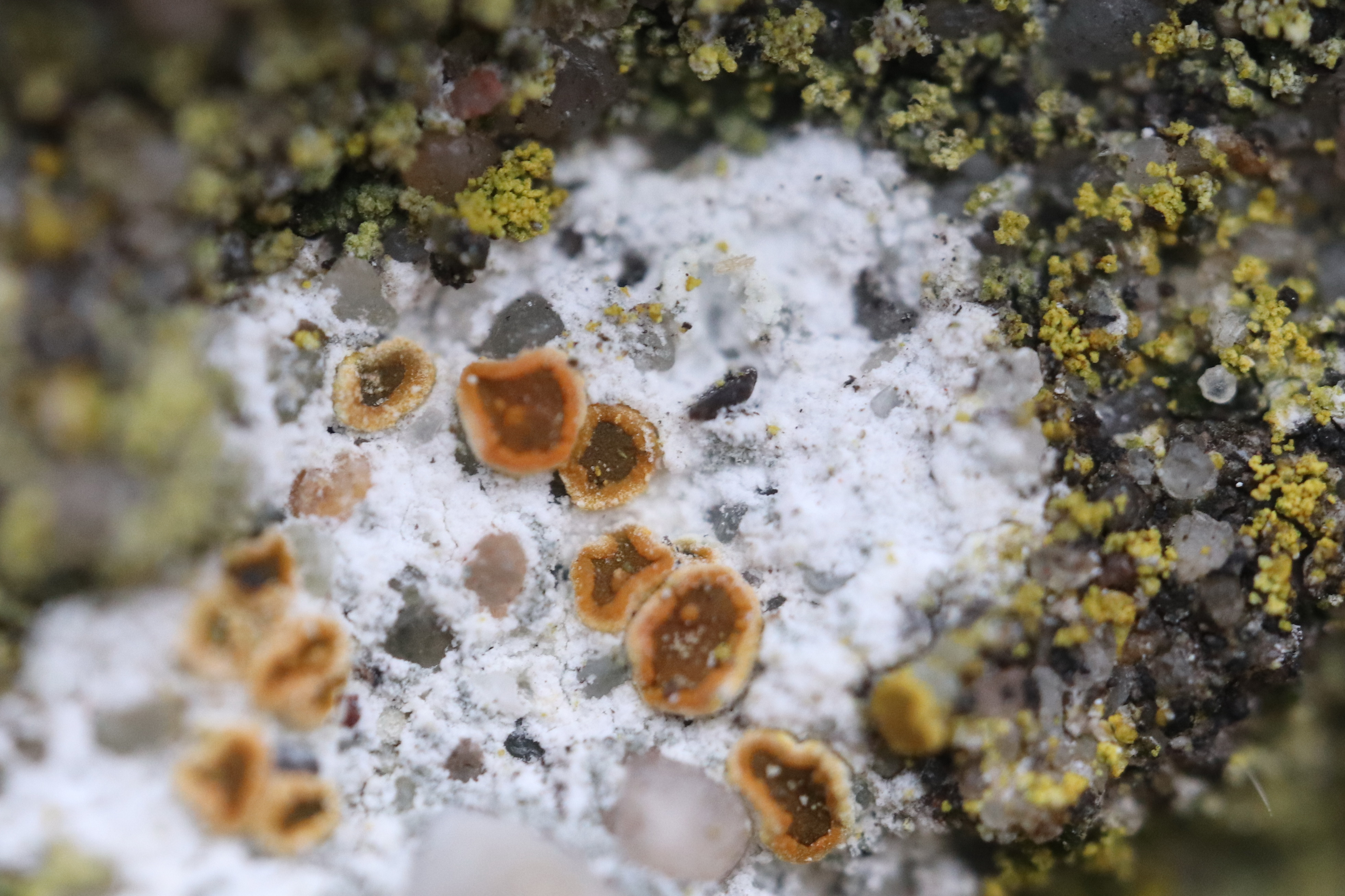
- Kuettlingeria albolutescens

Scientific classification
- Domain: Eukaryota
- Kingdom: Fungi
- Division: Ascomycota
- Class: Lecanoromycetes
- Order: Teloschistales
- Family: Teloschistaceae
- Genus: Kuettlingeria; Trevis. (1857)

Type species
- Kuettlingeria visianica (A.Massal.) Trevis. (1857)

Species
- See text

= Kuettlingeria =

Genus of lichens

Kuettlingeria is a genus of saxicolous (rock-dwelling), crustose lichens in the family Teloschistaceae. Species are characterized by a white or gray thallus and the presence of anthraquinones in the apothecial disc and true exciple, with the exception of Kuettlingeria diphyodes, which entirely lacks anthraquinones. First described by Italian botanist Trevisan in 1857, the genus includes 15 recognized species, although it is believed to be more diverse with additional unnamed species. These lichens are predominantly found in the Northern Hemisphere, particularly in the Mediterranean region, and grow on limestone and base-rich siliceous outcrops in sunlit conditions.

== Taxonomy ==
The lichen genus Kuettlingeria was first described by Vittore Benedetto Antonio Trevisan de Saint-Léon in 1857. The type species is Kuettlingeria visianica, which was previously known as Blastenia visianica and originally described by Abramo Bartolommeo Massalongo in 1852. As of 2021, 14 species are included in the genus, but it is believed to be more diverse and contain other unnamed species.

== Description ==
The thallus of Kuettlingeria species is crustose, epi- or rarely endolithic, and white or grey in colour. The cortex is paraplectenchymatous, usually represented by an alveolate (honeycomb-like) cortex. Some species have vegetative propagules, such as blastidia, soredia, isidia, or minute lobules. Apothecia are zeorine, rarely biatorine, sometimes appearing lecanorine, but a thin true exciple is always present. The thalline exciple is the same colour as the thallus, while the disc and true exciple are usually different shades of red and yellow. Ascospores are polaridiblastic, medium to broadly ellipsoid, with a medium-long septum. Pycnidia may be present or absent and are grey-black. The conidia are bacilliform to somewhat spherical.

The thallus and thalline exciple of Kuettlingeria species are always without anthraquinones but contain the pigment Sedifolia-gray. The epihymenium and upper part of the true exciple usually contain anthraquinones, such as non-chlorinated parietin or chlorinated 7-Cl-emodin, fragilin, or 7-Cl-citreorosein. Sometimes, the epihymenium and true exciple contain both anthraquinones and Sedifolia-gray. In some species, two chemotypes are known within the same species—with red-coloured apothecia (with anthraquinones) and rarer with black-colored apothecia (without anthraquinones, only with Sedifolia-gray). Kuettlingeria diphyodes is the only exception in the group—the chemotype entirely without anthraquinones is only known.

== Habitat and distribution ==
Kuettlingeria species are found in the Northern Hemisphere, with a biodiversity centre in the Mediterranean region. They are also found in non-Mediterranean Europe, Asia, North America, and Macaronesia. One record is known from Ecuador (K. aff. soralifera, found growing on concrete). The genus consists exclusively of saxicolous (rock-dwelling) taxa, which grow on limestone and base-rich siliceous outcrops in sunlit conditions, mostly from sea coasts to the mid-altitudinal zone. A few species, such as K. diphyodes and occasionally K. atroflava, grow on rather acidic siliceous boulders in streams. Kuettlingeria percrocata is a single species confined to the montane–alpine zone.

== Species ==
As of March 2023, Species Fungorum (in the Catalogue of Life) accepts 15 species of Kuettlingeria:

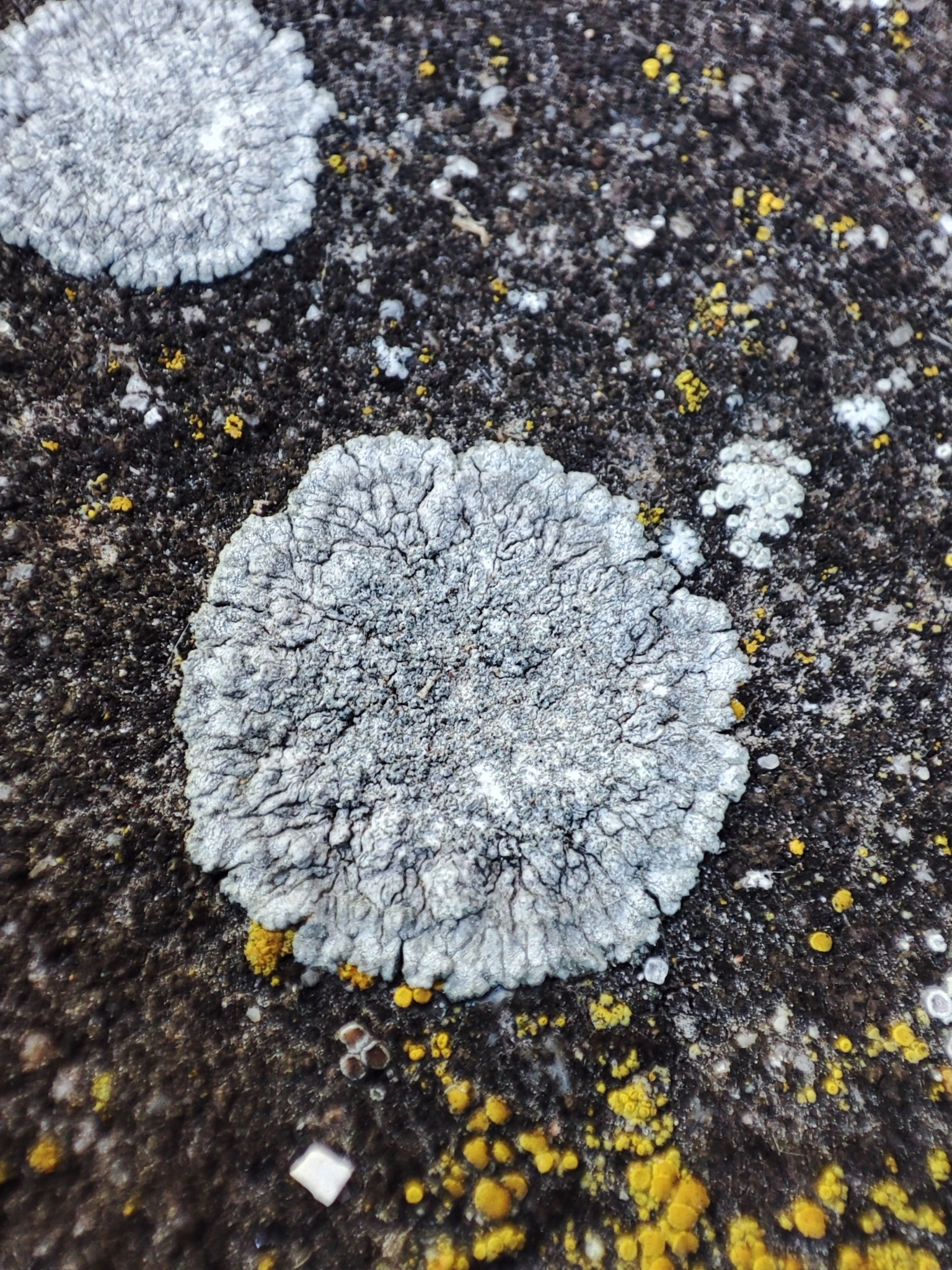
Kuettlingeria teicholyta

- Kuettlingeria albolutescens (Nyl.) I.V.Frolov, Vondrák & Arup (2020)
- Kuettlingeria areolata (Zahlbr.) I.V.Frolov, Vondrák & Arup (2020)
- Kuettlingeria atroflava (Turner) I.V.Frolov, Vondrák & Arup (2020)
- Kuettlingeria cretensis (Zahlbr.) I.V.Frolov & Vondrák (2020)
- Kuettlingeria crozetica (Zahlbr.) C.W.Dodge (1948)
- Kuettlingeria diphyodes (Nyl.) Frolov & Vondrák (2020)
- Kuettlingeria emilii (Vondrák, Khodos., Cl.Roux & V.Wirth) I.V.Frolov, Vondrák & Arup (2020)
- Kuettlingeria erythrocarpa (Pers.) I.V.Frolov, Vondrák & Arup (2020)
- Kuettlingeria furax (Egea & Llimona) I.V.Frolov, Vondrák & Arup (2020)
- Kuettlingeria fuscoatroides (J.Steiner) I.V.Frolov, Vondrák & Arup (2020)
- Kuettlingeria neotaurica (Vondrák, Khodos., Arup & Søchting) I.V.Frolov, Vondrák & Arup (2020)
- Kuettlingeria percrocata (Arnold) I.V.Frolov, Vondrák & Arup (2020)
- Kuettlingeria soralifera (Vondrák & Hrouzek) I.V.Frolov, Vondrák & Arup (2020)
- Kuettlingeria teicholyta (Ach.) Trevis. (1857)
- Kuettlingeria xerica (Poelt & Vězda) I.V.Frolov, Vondrák & Arup (2020)

Taxa formerly placed in Kuettlingeria:

- Kuettlingeria elegantissima (Nyl.) C.W.Dodge (1971), = Stellarangia elegantissima
- Kuettlingeria lallavei (Clemente ex Ach.) Trevis. (1857), = Kuettlingeria teicholyta
- Kuettlingeria macquariensis C.W.Dodge (1971), = Gondwania cribrosa
- Kuettlingeria physcioides (A.Massal.) C.W.Dodge (1971), = Dufourea physcioides
- Kuettlingeria visianica (A.Massal.) Trevis. (1857), = Kuettlingeria teicholyta
