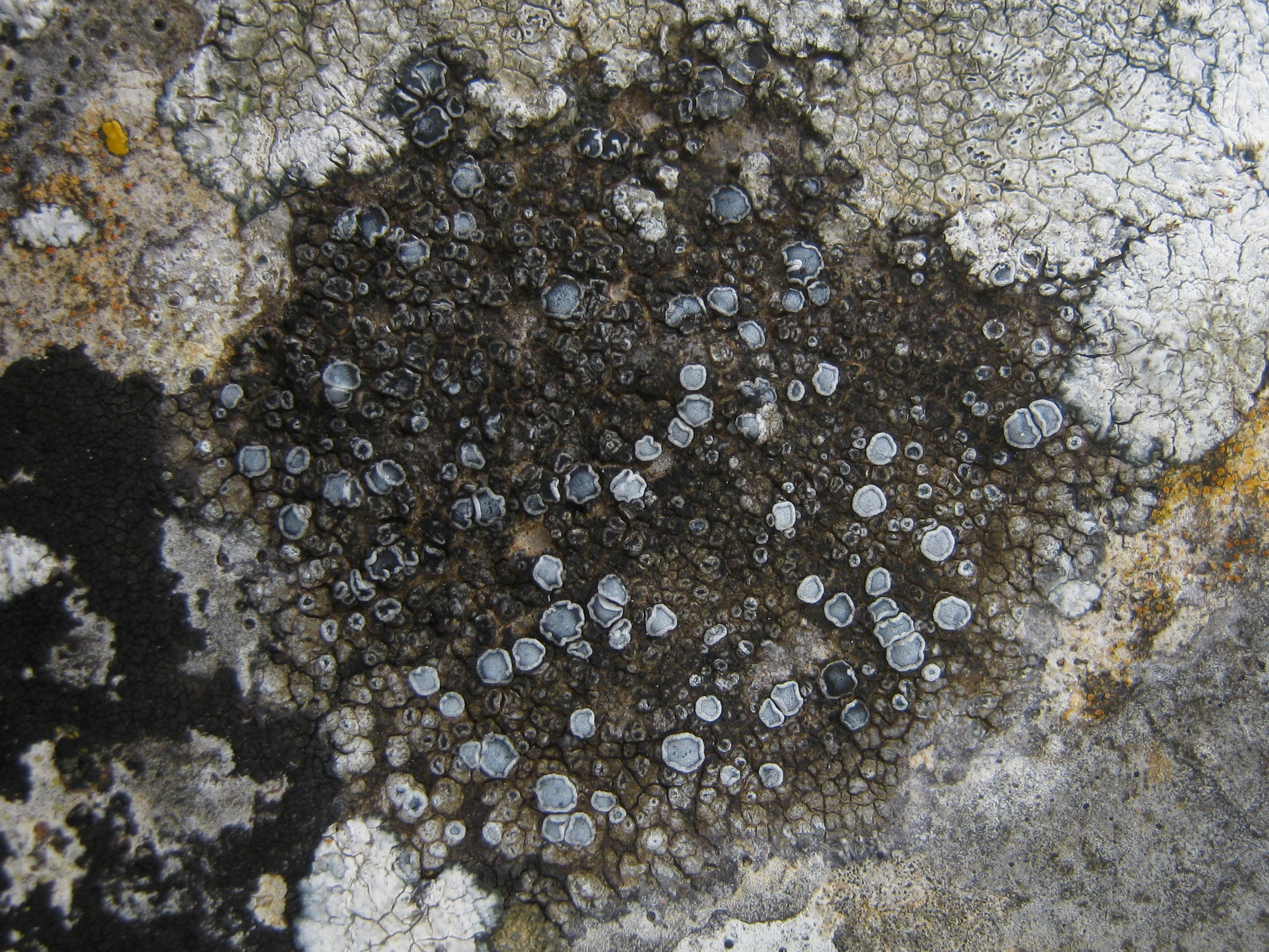

Conservation status
- Apparently Secure (NatureServe)

Scientific classification
- Kingdom: Fungi
- Division: Ascomycota
- Class: Lecanoromycetes
- Order: Teloschistales
- Family: Teloschistaceae
- Genus: Pyrenodesmia
- Species: P. variabilis

Binomial name
- Pyrenodesmia variabilis (Pers.) A.Massal. (1852)

Synonyms
- List: Lichen variabilis Pers. (1794); Psora variabilis (Pers.) Hoffm. (1796); Parmelia variabilis (Pers.) Ach. (1803); Collema variabile (Pers.) DC. (1805); Lecanora variabilis (Pers.) Ach. (1810); Lichen peltatus * variabilis (Pers.) Lam. (1813); Parmelia circinata var. variabilis (Pers.) Fr. (1831); Parmelia circinata f. variabilis (Pers.) Fr. (1831); Patellaria variabilis (Pers.) Wallr. (1831); Parmelia radiosa var. variabilis (Pers.) Schaer. (1840); Zeora variabilis (Pers.) Flot. (1849); Lecanora radiosa var. variabilis (Pers.) Schaer. (1850); Callopisma variabile (Pers.) Trevis. (1852); Placodium variabile (Pers.) Hepp (1853); Placodium circinatum var. variabile (Pers.) Nyl. (1857); Caloplaca variabilis (Pers.) Müll.Arg. (1862)

= Pyrenodesmia variabilis =

Species of lichen-forming fungus

Pyrenodesmia variabilis is a species of saxicolous (rock-dwelling), crustose lichen in the family Teloschistaceae. Characteristics of the species include its dark, areolate thallus, and its dark, sessile (stalkless) apothecia (fruiting bodies). It occurs on nutrient-rich limestone surfaces in Northern Europe, North America, Central America, and Asia.

== Taxonomy ==
The species was first scientifically described in 1794 by Christiaan Hendrik Persoon, who called it Lichen variabilis. Abramo Bartolommeo Massalongo transferred the taxon to the genus Pyrenodesmia in 1852, a genus he circumscribed to include a group of four species (P. agardhiana, P. chalybaea, P. olivacea, and P. variabilis), all of which lacked anthraquinones (a class of secondary metabolites common in the family Teloschistaceae), and contained instead the insoluble lichen pigment Sedifolia-gray.

As its species epithet suggests, this lichen has a variable appearance. Several infraspecific taxa have been proposed (i.e., varieties and forms), but their taxonomic status remains unresolved. The species has been proposed for inclusion in several different genera in its early taxonomic history; in some instances authors have suggested that it would be better classed as a variety or form of another species. It has subsequently acquired an extensive synonymy. The genus Pyrenodesmia was resurrected by Ulf Arup and colleagues in 2013. Pyrenodesmia includes members of the former Caloplaca variabilis species complex; the uniting chemical characteristic of this group of lichens were shown to be phylogenetically distinct.

== Description ==
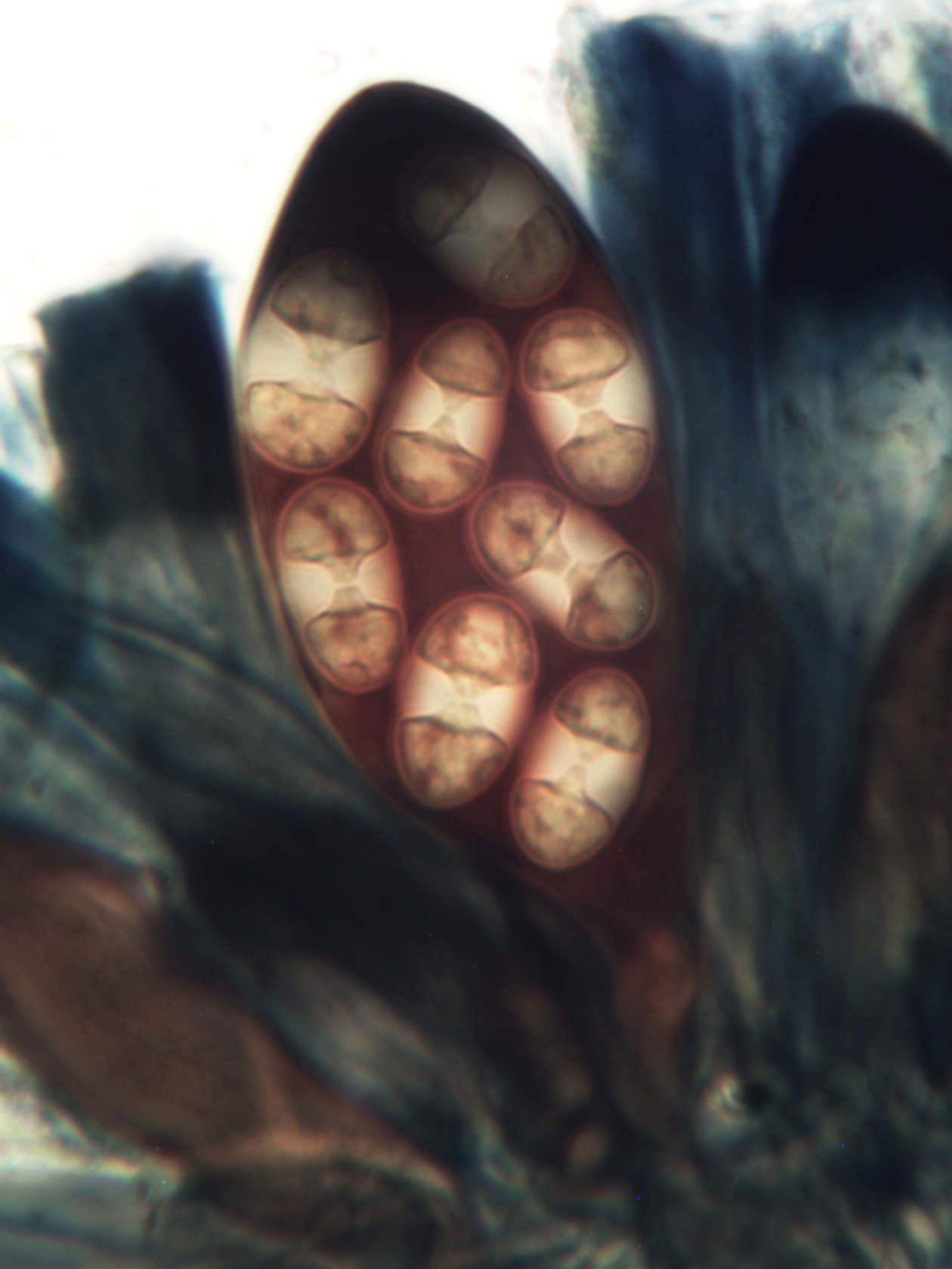
Ascus containing eight polarilocular ascospores with wide septa

Pyrenodesmia variabilis has a crust-like (crustose) thallus, which is grey to grey-brown, generally thin and somewhat smooth. Rarely, the colour is white. The thallus is areolate, meaning it has small, rounded, distinct patches. The central area of the thallus is darker than its edges, which may be bordered by a black prothallus. The photobiont partner is a member of the green algal genus Trebouxia.

Its apothecia, the fruiting bodies, are up to 1 mm in diameter. These apothecia are either sparsely scattered or densely crowded on the thallus surface, and they are sessile, meaning they are attached directly without a stalk. Initially flat, they tend to become slightly convex as they mature. The apothecia often have a thick, persistent margin with a grey-blue powdery (pruinose) appearance. The disc of the apothecia is black, while the epithecium, the layer above the spore-producing asci, is pale. The paraphyses, which are slender filament-like structures in the hymenium (spore-producing layer), broaden and become stouter towards their tips, reaching about 3 μm in diameter.

The ascospores of Pyrenodesmia variabilis number eight per ascus and are ellipsoid in shape, measuring 14–16 by 7–9 μm. They are polarilocular, with a septum (an internal dividing partition) that is 2–3 μm wide and can sometimes be as long as a third of the total length of the spore. When the thallus is treated with a solution of potassium hydroxide (i.e., the K spot test), it shows no reaction (K−), while the epithecium turns purple upon contact with this chemical (K+ purple).

== Habitat and distribution ==
Pyrenodesmia variabilis thrives on nutrient-rich limestone environments, flourishing on both natural boulders and human-made stonework. It is often found on horizontal surfaces such as the tops of chest tombs and the copings of walls and bridges. It is generally epilithic, meaning that it grows on the surface of rocks, but in a few instances, it has been recorded as endolithic–growing in the interior of rocks, under and around the rock crystals.

This species is widespread throughout England and Wales, including the English Midlands, with a distribution that extends sporadically to Scotland and Ireland. It also occurs in Bulgaria, Greece, Ukraine, and Russia. Pyrenodesmia variabilis is also found in the Northern Hemisphere, reaching as far as Central America. Its Asian distribution includes Nepal, where it has been reported from 2,000 to 3,500 m elevation in a compilation of published records. In Western Asia, it occurs in Iraq and Turkey.
