= Citreorosein =

Names
- Preferred IUPAC name 1,3,8-Trihydroxy-6-(hydroxymethyl)anthracene-9,10-dione
- Other names ω-Hydroxyemodin

Identifiers
CAS Number	481-73-2
3D model (JSmol)	Interactive image
ChEBI	CHEBI:81348
ChEMBL	ChEMBL290932
ChemSpider	320912
PubChem CID	361512
UNII	O2H2Z421AP
CompTox Dashboard (EPA)	DTXSID60197420
- InChI: InChI=1S/C15H10O6/c16-5-6-1-8-12(10(18)2-6)15(21)13-9(14(8)20)3-7(17)4-11(13)19/h1-4,16-19H,5H2 Key: YQHZABGPIPECSQ-UHFFFAOYSA-N
- SMILES: c1c(cc(c2c1C(=O)c3cc(cc(c3C2=O)O)O)O)CO

Properties
Chemical formula	C_{15}H_{10}O_{6}
Molar mass	286.239 g·mol^{−1}
Melting point	288 °C (550 °F; 561 K)
- Except where otherwise noted, data are given for materials in their standard state (at 25 °C [77 °F], 100 kPa). Infobox references

Citreorosein is a polyketide made by Penicillium that has antimicrobial activity.
