= Pyrenodesmia micromarina =

Scientific classification
- Domain: Eukaryota
- Kingdom: Fungi
- Division: Ascomycota
- Class: Lecanoromycetes
- Order: Teloschistales
- Family: Teloschistaceae
- Genus: Pyrenodesmia
- Species: P. micromarina

Binomial name
- Pyrenodesmia micromarina (Frolov, Khodos. & Vondrák) I.V.Frolov & Vondrák (2020)

Synonyms
- Caloplaca micromarina Frolov, Khodos. & Vondrák (2016)

Species of lichen

Pyrenodesmia micromarina is a species of saxicolous (rock-dwelling), crustose lichen in the family Teloschistaceae. It is found in the Eastern Mediterranean, specifically along the coasts of the Black Sea and the Sea of Marmara in Russia, Turkey, and Ukraine. It grows on coastal rocks and occasionally concrete, often in Mediterranean scrub vegetation.

== Taxonomy ==
The lichen was first formally described as a new species in 2016 by the lichenologists Ivan Frolov, Oleksandr Khodosovtsev, and Jan Vondrák, who placed it in the genus Caloplaca. The type specimen was collected near Gaziköy in a small brook valley at elevations of 20–40 m (66–131 ft) above sea level. Frolov and Vondrák later transferred it to genus Pyrenodesmia.

== Description ==
This species of Pyrenodesmia is recognized by several key features: it lacks anthraquinones (common in the family Teloschistaceae), and its thallus, which is usually thinner than 200 μm, does not have a distinct cortex and has a Sedifolia-grey colouration. The mature apothecia are typically smaller than 0.5 mm in diameter, with a black disc with a true, zeorine exciple.

The thallus of Pyrenodesmia micromarina is ochre to grey, occasionally with white spots, and forms small, irregular to roundish spots. It consists of tightly arranged, flat areoles. The medulla is inconspicuous, and the algal layer is made up of spherical cells. The cortex is usually not developed, but an alveolate cortex might be present with an indistinct boundary. The lichen does not have vegetative diaspores and occasionally has a white pruina, particularly around the apothecia.

Apothecia are small, with a black disc and a true exciple that matches the thallus in colour. The hymenium is colourless and may contain stacks of extracellular crystals. The asci are clavate, containing eight polarilocular, colourless ascospores with rather wide septa.

Pycnidia are commonly observed, with darker grey tops on the thallus surface. The conidia are ellipsoid to broadly ellipsoid.

== Chemistry ==
Chemical tests reveal that the thallus and apothecia are negative for potassium hydroxide (K), calcium hypochlorite (C), and p-phenylenediamine (P) reactions and are not fluorescent under ultraviolet light. The epihymenium and the outer cells of the true exciple contain Sedifolia-grey, which reacts to water and potassium hydroxide. However, no substances were detected by high-performance liquid chromatography in apothecia and thallus samples.

== Distribution and ecology ==
Caloplaca micromarina is a maritime species found in the Eastern Mediterranean, specifically along the coasts of the Black Sea and the Sea of Marmara in Russia, Turkey, and Ukraine. It grows on coastal rocks and occasionally concrete, often in Mediterranean scrub vegetation. The species co-occurs with various lichens including Aspicilia contorta, Caloplaca conversa, and Candelariella aurella.
