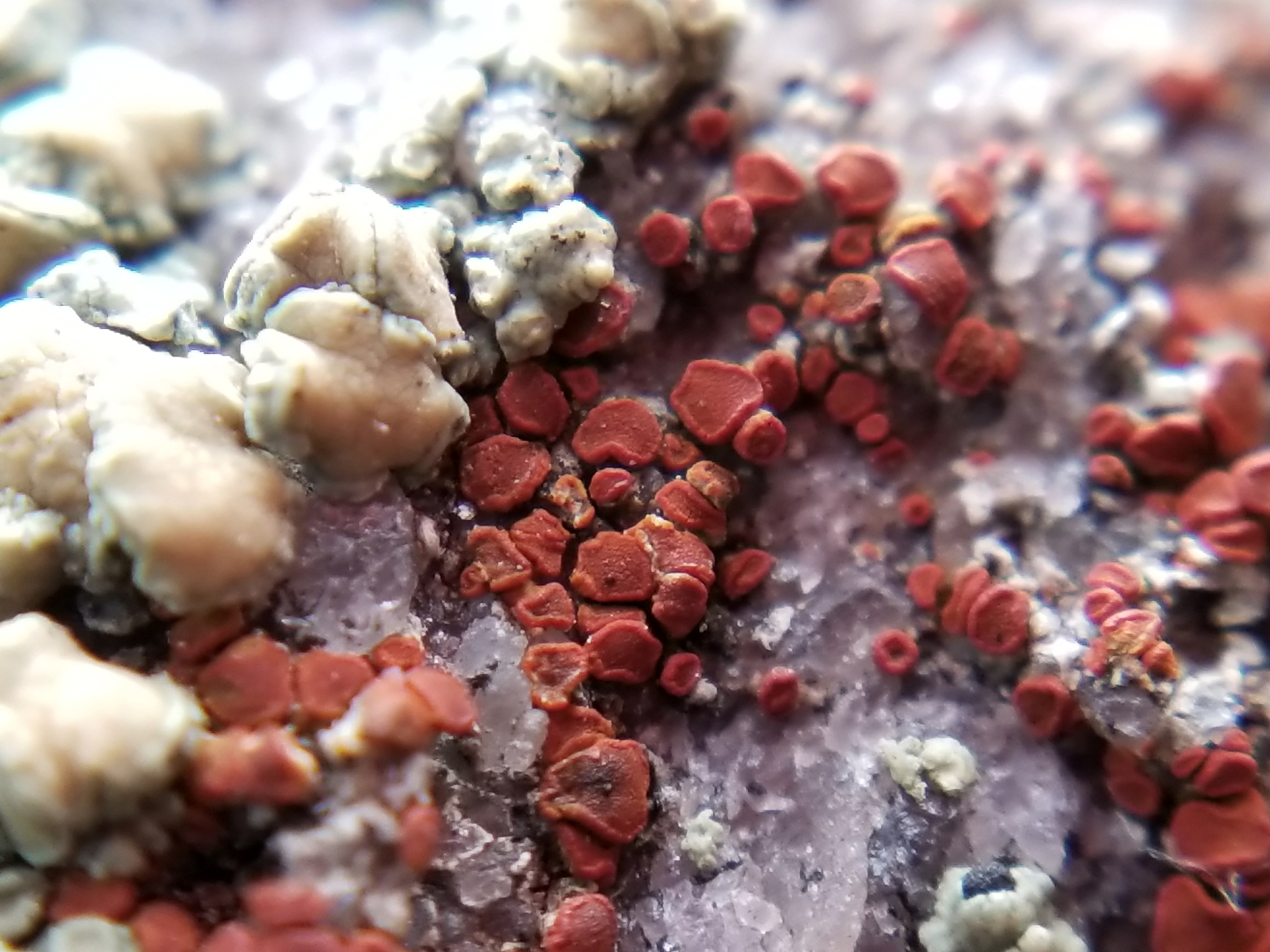
- Rufoplaca arenaria

Scientific classification
- Kingdom: Fungi
- Division: Ascomycota
- Class: Lecanoromycetes
- Order: Teloschistales
- Family: Teloschistaceae
- Genus: Rufoplaca; Arup, Søchting & Frödén (2013)

Type species
- Rufoplaca subpallida (H.Magn.) Arup, Søchting & Frödén (2013)

Species
- See text

= Rufoplaca =

Genus of lichens

Rufoplaca is a genus of lichen-forming fungi in the family Teloschistaceae. The genus is found primarily across the Northern Hemisphere, with most species occurring in Europe and additional records from North America and Asia. These lichens typically grow as thin crusts with orange-red colouration on sun-exposed rocks and other surfaces. The genus was established in 2013 to group together several previously scattered species that genetic studies showed formed a natural evolutionary lineage.

== Taxonomy ==
Rufoplaca was established by Ulf Arup, Ulrik Søchting and Patrik Frödén to accommodate a coherent set of orange-red Teloschistaceae previously scattered in other genera; the type species is Rufoplaca subpallida. The name means 'with reddish-brown discs', referring to the colour of the fruiting bodies. In their analyses, the genus formed a fairly uniform lineage; its closest relative was Usnochroma, which differs chemically (it contains usnic acid in the thallus) and in spore form (with a longer internal septum). Species of Rufoplaca can resemble Blastenia in general appearance, but Rufoplaca characteristically has orange-to-rusty apothecia rich in chlorinated anthraquinone pigments. Taxa of the former "Caloplaca xerica" species group are also similar; however, they differ in their chemistry, showing a different pigment suite ("chemosyndrome C" rather than the "chemosyndrome A" typical of Rufoplaca). The circumscription originally included the following new combinations: R. arenaria, R. germanica, R. oxfordensis, R. scotoplaca, R. subpallida (type), and R. tristiuscula.

== Description ==
The thallus is crustose, forming a thin, paint-like crust on the substrate, and may range from very thin to relatively thick; in some specimens it can be so reduced as to appear absent. A distinctive grey pigment (Sedifolia-grey) may be present in the thallus. The apothecia are orange to rusty red and have rims that vary from biatorine to zeorine in form—that is, the edge may be formed only by the fruit body tissue (biatorine) or may include a thin rim of thallus tissue around it (zeorine). Asci produce two-celled (polarilocular) spores with a short to medium-length septum between the two end chambers, a spore type common in this family. Asexual reproductive structures (pycnidia) may be present or absent; when present they produce slender, rod-shaped to narrowly ellipsoid conidia.

Chemically, species of Rufoplaca conform mostly to chemosyndrome A, meaning they share a characteristic set of lichen pigments dominated by chlorinated anthraquinones; gyrophoric acid may occur rarely.

== Habitat and distribution ==
Rufoplaca is primarily a Northern Hemisphere genus. Most records are from Europe, with additional occurrences in North America and Asia. Within this range, species grow as crusts on suitable substrates (typically sun-exposed, where their orange-red pigments are common), mirroring the habitats used by related, look-alike Teloschistaceae.

== Species ==
As of October 2025, Species Fungorum (in the Catalogue of Life) accepts 13 species of Rufoplaca:

- Rufoplaca aesanensis S.Y.Kondr. & Hur (2020) – South Korea
- Rufoplaca arenaria (Pers.) Arup, Søchting & Frödén (2013)
- Rufoplaca cecericola (B.de Lesd.) Cl.Roux (2023)
- Rufoplaca germanica (H.Magn.) Arup, Søchting & Frödén (2013)
- Rufoplaca kaernefeltiana S.Y.Kondr., Lőkös & Hur (2017)
- Rufoplaca oxfordensis (Fink) Arup, Søchting & Frödén (2013)
- Rufoplaca rubroaurantiaca (B.de Lesd.) Cl.Roux (2022)
- Rufoplaca scotoplaca (Nyl.) Arup, Søchting & Frödén (2013)
- Rufoplaca subpallida (H.Magn.) Arup, Søchting & Frödén (2013)
- Rufoplaca toktoana S.Y.Kondr., Lőkös & Hur (2019)
- Rufoplaca tristiuscula (H.Magn.) Arup, Søchting & Frödén (2013)
- Rufoplaca ulleungensis S.Y.Kondr., L.Lőkös & Hur (2018)
