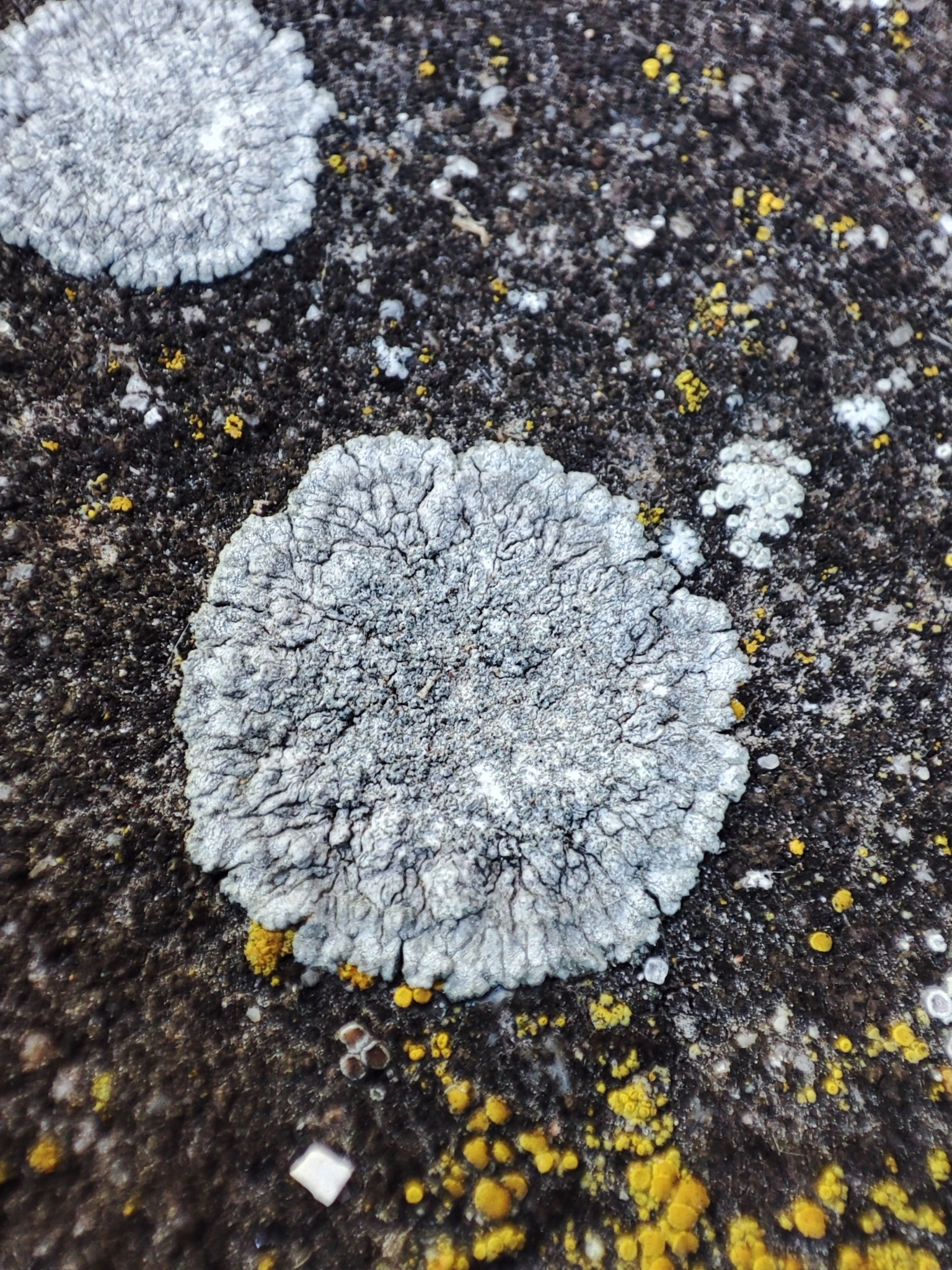

Scientific classification
- Domain: Eukaryota
- Kingdom: Fungi
- Division: Ascomycota
- Class: Lecanoromycetes
- Order: Teloschistales
- Family: Teloschistaceae
- Genus: Kuettlingeria
- Species: K. teicholyta

Binomial name
- Kuettlingeria teicholyta (Ach.) Trevis. (1857)

Synonyms
- List: Biatora erythrocarpa f. lallavei (Clemente ex Ach.) Stenh. (1848); Blastenia arenaria var. teicholyta (Ach.) Arnold (1884); Blastenia lallavei (Clemente ex Ach.) A.Massal. (1852); Blastenia teicholyta (Ach.) Bausch (1869); Blastenia visianica A.Massal. (1852); Callopisma arenarium var. teicholytum (Ach.) Jatta (1886); Callopisma lallavei (Clemente ex Ach.) Trevis. (1852); Callopisma teicholytum (Ach.) Müll.Arg. (1880); Callopisma visianicum (A.Massal.) Trevis. [as 'visianii'] (1852); Caloplaca arenaria f. teicholyta (Ach.) J.Steiner (1894); Caloplaca arenaria var. lallavei (Clemente ex Ach.) Zahlbr. (1898); Caloplaca arenaria var. teicholyta (Ach.) Baroni (1908); Caloplaca lallavei (Clemente ex Ach.) Flagey (1886); Caloplaca lallavei f. calcicola Flagey (1891); Caloplaca teicholyta (Ach.) J.Steiner (1895); Caloplaca visianica (A.Massal.) Jatta (1900); Kuettlingeria lallavei (Clemente ex Ach.) Trevis. (1857); Kuettlingeria visianica (A.Massal.) Trevis. [as 'visianii'] (1857); Lecanora erythrocarpa var. lallavei (Clemente ex Ach.) Nyl. (1853); Lecanora ferruginea var. lallavei (Clemente ex Ach.) Nyl. (1855); Lecanora lallavei (Clemente ex Ach.) Dufour (1850); Lecanora teicholyta Ach. (1810); Lecidea erythrocarpa var. teicholyta (Ach.) Grognot (1863); Lecidea lallavei Clemente ex Ach. [as 'lallave'] (1814); Lecidea teicholyta (Ach.) Hue (1913); Lecidea visianica (A.Massal.) Hue (1914); Lichen peltatus * teicholyta (Ach.) Lam. (1813); Parmelia erythrocarpia var. lallavei (Clemente ex Ach.) Fr. (1831); Parmelia teicholyta (Ach.) Spreng. (1827); Patellaria erythrocarpa var. lallavei (Clemente ex Ach.) Steinh. (1834); Patellaria teicholyta (Ach.) Wallr. (1831); Patellaria teicholyta var. blastemica Wallr. (1831); Placodium lallavei (Clemente ex Ach.) Anzi (1862); Placodium teicholytum (Ach.) DC. (1815); Placodium teicholytum var. lallavei (Clemente ex Ach.) H.Olivier (1897); Placodium visianicum (A.Massal.) H.Olivier (1909); Pyrenodesmia teicholyta (Ach.) E.D.Rudolph (1955)

= Kuettlingeria teicholyta =

Species of lichen

Kuettlingeria teicholyta is a species of saxicolous (rock-dwelling), crustose lichen in the family Teloschistaceae, and the type species of the genus Kuettlingeria. It is a widely distributed lichen, having been recorded from Africa, Asia, and Europe.

== Taxonomy ==
The species was first formally described in 1810 by the Swedish lichenologist Erik Acharius, who placed it in the genus Lecanora. The type specimen was collected by Léon Jean Marie Dufour from France. Italian botanist Vittore Benedetto Antonio Trevisan de Saint-Léon transferred the taxon to the newly proposed genus Kuettlingeria in 1857. In his original circumscription of the genus, it contained three species: K. lallavei, K. visianica, and K. teicholyta. The first two species, including Blastenia visianica, the type species of genus Kuettlingeria (originally described by Abramo Bartolommeo Massalongo in 1852) are now synonymous with K. teicholyta. As a result, Kuettlingeria teicholyta is the type species of genus Kuettlingeria.

== Description ==
Kuettlingeria teicholyta is characterised by its obscurely placodioid thallus. The thallus typically forms closely appressed, rounded formations that vary from thin to thick and have a white-grey colouration. The ends of the lobes in this species are often poorly differentiated, presenting as rounded, flat, or slightly convex structures without distinct furrows. These lobes form a complete zone around the edge of the thallus, contributing to its overall rounded appearance.

The surface of Kuettlingeria teicholyta is uniform and scurfy, especially towards the centre of the thallus, and it is common to find small granules on the surface. Occasionally, the thallus may display weak areolation. Soredia in this species are granular and white, typically forming through the erosion of the thallus surface in the central area.

Apothecia in Kuettlingeria teicholyta, though uncommon, are quite conspicuous when present. They can reach up to 0.8 mm in diameter and are scattered or sometimes crowded on the thallus. Initially, these apothecia are immersed within the thallus and deeply concave, but they eventually become flat. The thalline margin, when present, is white and undulate, while the proper margin is flexuose, swollen, and bright orange in colour. The discs of the apothecia are orange to red to brown, occasionally with a white-pruinose surface.

Paraphyses in Kuettlingeria teicholyta are slender, flexuose, and branched, without swelling at the tips. Ascospores are ellipsoid, measuring 15–18 by 7–10 μm. The septum is often under 4 μm wide, making up to one-quarter of the length of the ascospore. Chemical spot tests on the thallus yield negative results (K−), while apothecia have a K+ (purple-red) reaction. Kuettlingeria teicholyta is a member of chemosyndrome C_{5}, characterised by 7‐chloro-emodin as the dominant secondary metabolite in association with a substantial proportion of fragilin.

== Distribution ==
Kuettlingeria teicholyta occurs in Africa, Asia, and Europe.
