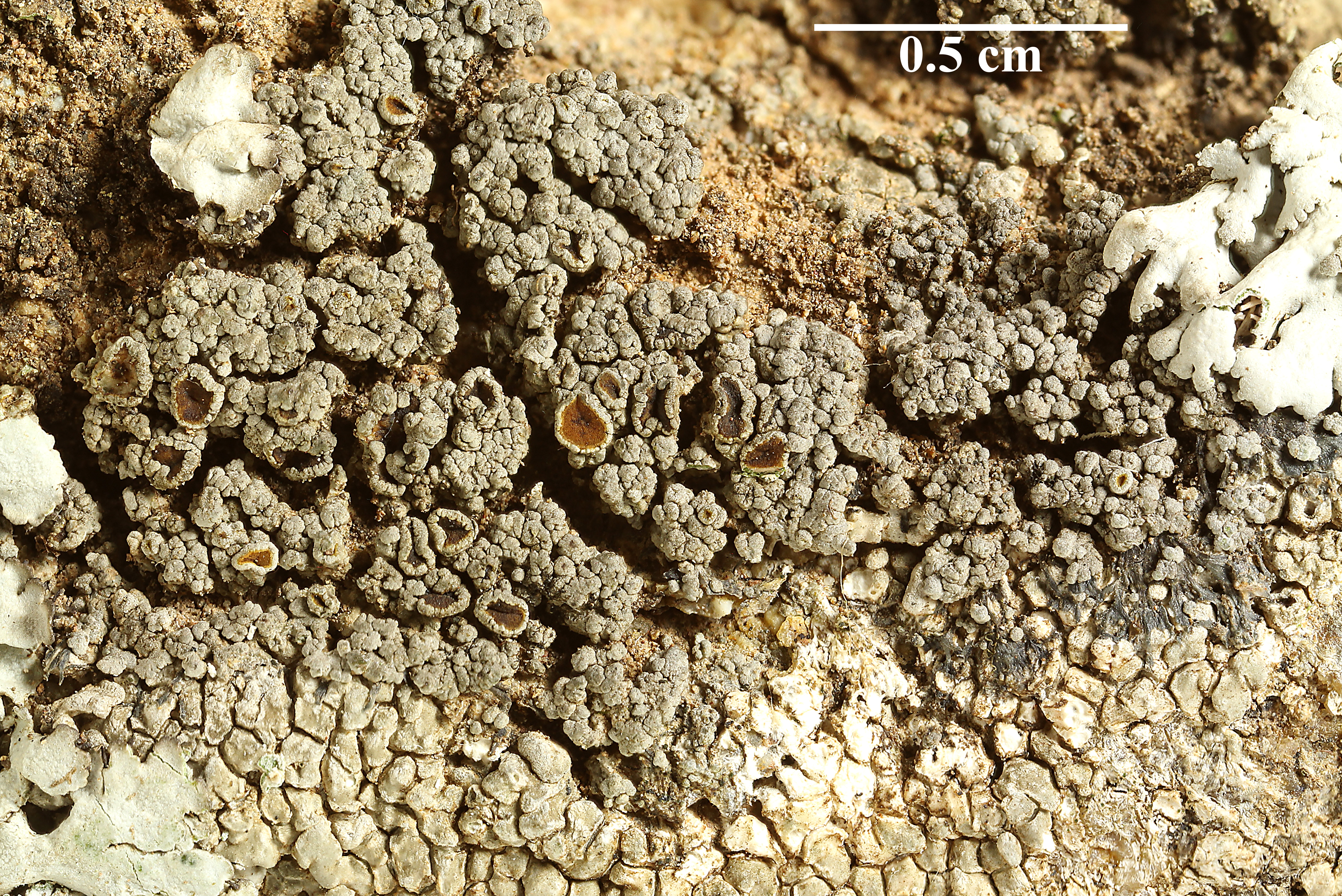
- on sandstone in Greece

Scientific classification
- Domain: Eukaryota
- Kingdom: Fungi
- Division: Ascomycota
- Class: Lecanoromycetes
- Order: Teloschistales
- Family: Teloschistaceae
- Genus: Kuettlingeria
- Species: K. furax

Binomial name
- Kuettlingeria furax (Egea & Llimona) I.V.Frolov, Vondrák & Arup (2020)

Synonyms
- Caloplaca furax Egea & Llimona (1983); Pisutiella furax (Egea & Llimona) S.Y.Kondr., Lőkös & Farkas (2020)

= Kuettlingeria furax =

Species of lichen

Kuettlingeria furax is a species of lichenicolous (lichen-dwelling) crustose lichen in the family Teloschistaceae. It grows as a parasite on other lichens in the genus Aspicilia that are found on silica-rich rock surfaces. Originally described in 1983 as Caloplaca furax from specimens found in southeastern Spain, it forms small, circular patches of deep brownish-grey colour with lobed edges.

== Taxonomy ==
It was first formally described as a new species in 1983 by José María Egea Fernández and Xavier Llimona; they classified it in the genus Caloplaca. The type specimen was discovered in the eastern part of the Sierra Morena mountains in Albacete, Spain, growing parasitically on lichens in the genus Aspicilia found on silica-rich surfaces. The species name furax comes from Latin, meaning 'inclined to steal', alluding to its parasitic nature. It was collected in the Sierra del Relumbrar growing on metamorphic schist at an elevation of 830 m in a sparse holm oak woodland habitat.

Kuettlingeria furax appears as small, circular patches that are a deep brownish-grey colour. It has a somewhat lobed edge, and its reproductive structures (apothecia), quickly lose their thalline margin. The authors compared it to Caloplaca conglomerata, but noted the distinctness of its spores, which are broader and have a bulged middle. The taxon was transferred to the genus Kuettlingeria in 2020; it has also been proposed for inclusion in the genus Pisutiella.

== Description ==
Kuettlingeria furax is a crustose lichen that grows as a parasite on Aspicilia species found on siliceous rocks. It forms small, rounded patches (rosettes) measuring 2–6 mm in diameter that often merge together. These patches are greyish to leaden-grey with a slightly brownish tint, and have a somewhat lobed margin. As the lichen matures, the centre begins to disintegrate, giving it a ring-like appearance. The thallus (main body) is relatively thick (135–175 μm) with a cortex that contains a violet-grey pigment in its upper half.

The reproductive structures (apothecia) measure 0.4–0.8 mm in diameter and are initially enclosed in wart-like protrusions of the thallus. As they develop, the bright orange proper margin gradually extends beyond the grey thalline margin. The disc is round or sometimes deformed due to crowding, initially concave but becoming flat, and ranges from bright orange to orange-brown in colour. When tested with potassium hydroxide solution (K), the apothecia turn purple, while the thallus shows no reaction. The spores are polaribilocular (with two cells connected by a canal), broadly ellipsoid or nearly spherical (globose)), often with an equatorial swelling, and measure approximately 12.5–14 by 7–10 μm.

Kuettlingeria furax differs from the similar species Caloplaca conglomerata by having a thalline margin that quickly becomes inconspicuous, larger and wider spores with equatorial swelling, and its parasitic lifestyle on silicicolous Aspicilia species.
