= Usnochroma =

Scientific classification
- Domain: Eukaryota
- Kingdom: Fungi
- Division: Ascomycota
- Class: Lecanoromycetes
- Order: Teloschistales
- Family: Teloschistaceae
- Genus: Usnochroma; Søchting, Arup & Frödén (2013)

Type species
- Usnochroma carphineum (Fr.) Søchting, Arup & Frödén 2013

Species
- U. carphineum U. scoriophilum

Genus of lichens

Usnochroma is a genus of lichen-forming fungi in the family Teloschistaceae. It has two species of crustose lichens. The genus was circumscribed in 2013 by lichenologists Ulrik Søchting, Ulf Arup, and Patrik Frödén, with Usnochroma carphineum assigned as the type species. The genus name refers to the yellowish-green colour of the thallus, which is caused by the substance usnic acid. Usnochroma species occur in Macaronesia, South Africa, the Mediterranean Basin, and Algeria.

== Description ==
Usnochroma has a crust-like thallus that is pale yellow in colour. It does not contain anthraquinones, compounds often responsible for the yellow and orange colours in many lichens of the Teloschistaceae. The outer layer, or cortex, occurs in one of two tissue structures: paraplectenchymatous or scleroplectenchymatous. The reproductive structures, known as apothecia, are zeorine in form, characterized by a very thin outer edge and a rusty orange-coloured central disc. The spores of this genus are distinctive, being polaridiblastic with an elongated partition, or septum. There is no observed presence of pycnidia, another type of reproductive structure.

The thallus contains usnic acid and gyrophoric acid. In addition to these, the apothecia contain parietin.

Buellia badia and Tremella caloplacae are lichenicolous fungi that have been recorded parasitising Usnochroma carphinea.

== Species ==
- Usnochroma carphineum (Fr.) Søchting, Arup & Frödén (2013)
- Usnochroma scoriophilum (A.Massal.) Søchting, Arup & Frödén (2013)
