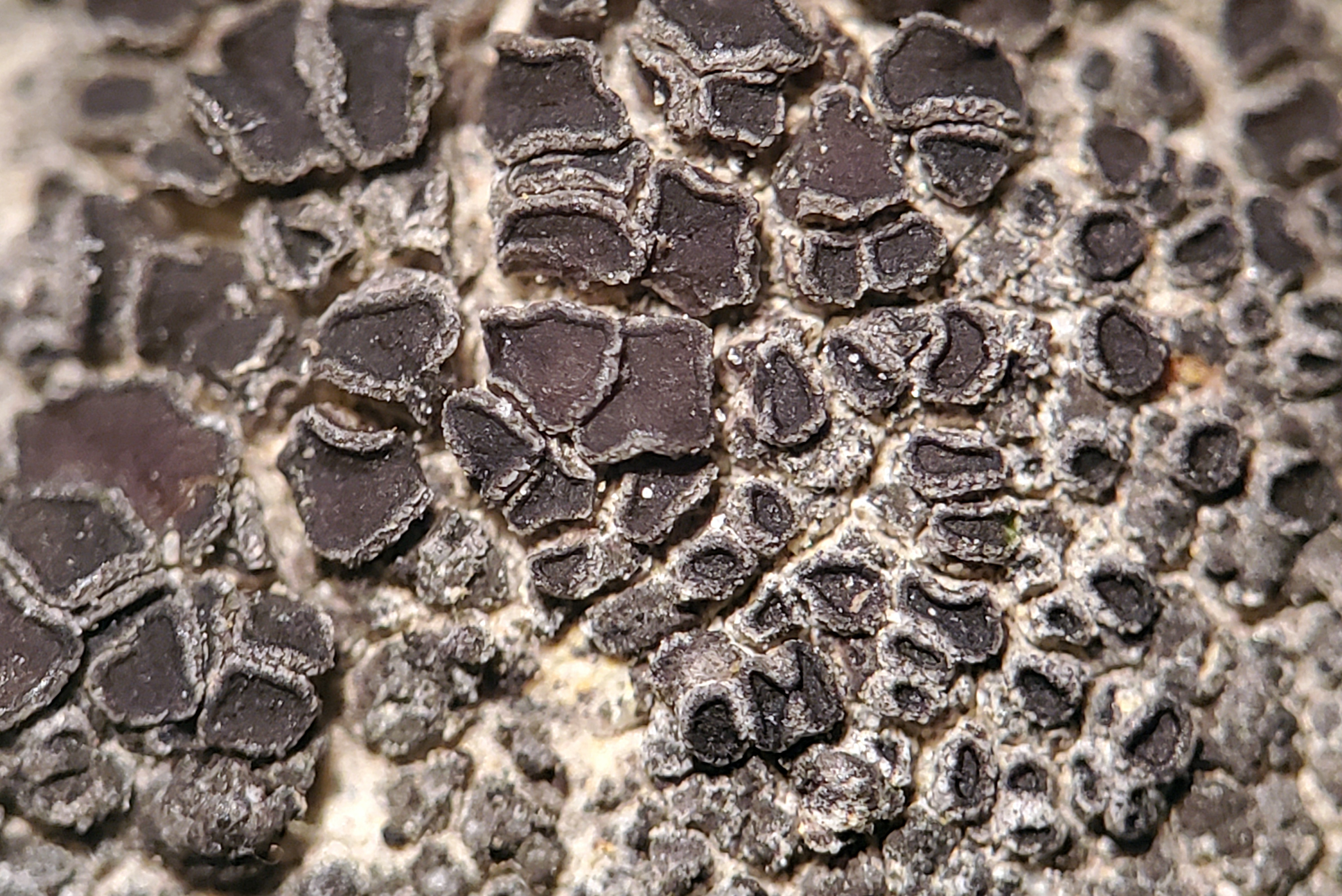
- Pyrenodesmia variabilis

Scientific classification
- Domain: Eukaryota
- Kingdom: Fungi
- Division: Ascomycota
- Class: Lecanoromycetes
- Order: Teloschistales
- Family: Teloschistaceae
- Genus: Pyrenodesmia; A.Massal. (1852)

Type species
- Pyrenodesmia chalybaea (Fr.) A.Massal. (1853)

Species
- See text

= Pyrenodesmia =

Genus of fungi

Pyrenodesmia is a genus of lichen-forming fungi in the family Teloschistaceae. The genus currently includes 23 recognized species but is believed to contain many more unnamed taxa. The genus was circumscribed in 1852 by Italian lichenologist Abramo Bartolommeo Massalongo. It is characterised by the complete absence of anthraquinones and the presence of Sedifolia-gray pigments in both the thallus and apothecia. These lichens are typically found in calcareous outcrops in the Northern Hemisphere, with biodiversity centres in the Mediterranean basin, Central Asia, and arid regions of western North America.

== Taxonomy ==
The genus Pyrenodesmia was circumscribed by Abramo Bartolommeo Massalongo (1852). In his original conception, Massalongo included four species (P. agardhiana, P. chalybaea, P. olivacea, and P. variabilis) and three infraspecific taxa (P. variabilis β. lilacina, P. variabilis δ. pulchella, and P. variabilis γ. fusca). These taxa all grow on calcareous outcrops, lack anthraquinones, and have Sedifolia‐gray both in their thallus and apothecia. Ulf Arup and colleagues (2013) resurrected the genus, recognizing both Pyrenodesmia sensu stricto and the informal group Pyrenodesmia sensu lato. Pyrenodesmia sensu stricto includes species that lack anthraquinones and possess Sedifolia-gray, while Pyrenodesmia sensu lato also includes species with anthraquinones in the apothecia. The taxonomy of the genus remains complex, with several taxa awaiting more robust data for proper classification.

== Description ==
Pyrenodesmia species have a crustose, epi- or endolithic thallus that is white, gray, or brown in colour. The cortex is usually represented by an alveolate cortex and is paraplectenchymatous. The apothecia are zeorine or rarely biatorine in form, with brown, gray, or black discs and true exciples. Ascospores are polar-diblastic with a short to large long septum. Pycnidia are present or absent, gray or black, and conidia are bacilliform to somewhat spherical. In Pyrenodesmia, the thalli, apothecia, and pycnidia always lack anthraquinones but have Sedifolia-gray pigments.

== Habitat and distribution ==
Pyrenodesmia species are mainly distributed in the Mediterranean region, Central Asia, and desert regions of western North America, with a few taxa found in other parts of Europe, Asia, and North America. They exclusively grow on rocks, inhabiting calcareous outcrops in Europe and base-rich siliceous outcrops in Central Asia and the United States. These lichens can be found in sunlit conditions from coast to alpine zones, with some species such as P. helygeoides growing on acidic siliceous boulders in water.

== Species ==
- Pyrenodesmia aetnensis (B.de Lesd.) S.Y.Kondr. (2020)
- Pyrenodesmia albopruinosa (Arnold) S.Y.Kondr. (2020)
- Pyrenodesmia albopustulata (Khodos. & S.Y.Kondr.) I.V.Frolov & Vondrák (2020)
- Pyrenodesmia alociza (A.Massal.) Arnold (1884)
- Pyrenodesmia aractina (Fr.) S.Y.Kondr. (2020)
- Pyrenodesmia badioreagens (Tretiach & Muggia) Søchting, Arup & Frödén (2013)
- Pyrenodesmia bicolor (H.Magn.) S.Y.Kondr. (2020)
- Pyrenodesmia bullata (Müll.Arg.) I.V.Frolov & Vondrák (2020)
- Pyrenodesmia ceracea (J.R.Laundon) S.Y.Kondr. (2020)
- Pyrenodesmia chalybaea (Fr.) A.Massal. (1852)
- Pyrenodesmia concreticola (Vondrák & Khodos.) Søchting, Arup & Frödén (2013)
- Pyrenodesmia duplicata (Vain.) S.Y.Kondr., Lőkös & Hur (2017)
- Pyrenodesmia erodens (Tretiach, Pinna & Grube) Søchting, Arup & Frödén (2013)
- Pyrenodesmia haematites (Chaub. ex St.-Amans) S.Y.Kondr. (2020)
- Pyrenodesmia helygeoides (Vain.) Arnold (1897)
- Pyrenodesmia micromarina (Frolov, Khodos. & Vondrák) I.V.Frolov & Vondrák (2020)
- Pyrenodesmia micromontana (Frolov, Wilk & Vondrák) Hafellner & Türk (2016)
- Pyrenodesmia microstepposa (Frolov, Nadyeina, Khodos. & Vondrák) Hafellner & Türk (2016)
- Pyrenodesmia molariformis (Frolov, Vondrák, Nadyeina & Khodos.) S.Y.Kondr. (2020)
- Pyrenodesmia peliophylla (Tuck.) S.Y.Kondr. (2020)
- Pyrenodesmia pratensis (Wetmore) I.V.Frolov & Vondrák (2020)
- Pyrenodesmia tianshanensis (Xahidin, A.Abbas & J.C.Wei) I.V.Frolov & Vondrák (2020)
- Pyrenodesmia variabilis (Pers.) A.Massal. (1852)
- Pyrenodesmia vernadskiensis S.Y.Kondr., T.O.Kondratiuk & I.Yu.Parnikoza (2020) – Western coast of Antarctic Peninsula
- Pyrenodesmia viridirufa (Ach.) S.Y.Kondr. (2020)
