= Calogaya orientalis =

Scientific classification
- Domain: Eukaryota
- Kingdom: Fungi
- Division: Ascomycota
- Class: Lecanoromycetes
- Order: Teloschistales
- Family: Teloschistaceae
- Genus: Calogaya
- Species: C. orientalis

Binomial name
- Calogaya orientalis Moniri, Shahidin, Halıcı & Vondrák (2018)

Species of lichen

Calogaya orientalis is a species of corticolous (bark-dwelling) and muscicolous lichen (moss-dwelling), crustose lichen in the family Teloschistaceae. It is found in arid steppe and desert habitats in Northwestern China, Iran, and Turkey. The thallus of this lichen is reduced, similar to species in the genus Athallia.

== Taxonomy ==
The lichen was formally described as a new species in 2018 by Mahroo Moniri, Hurnisa Shahidin, Mehmet Gökhan Halıcı, and Jan Vondrák. The type specimen was collected from the western edge of the Kunlun Mountains (at an altitude of 2,840 m (9,320 ft); there, in an alpine desert, it was found growing on the dead wood of Juniperus centrasiatica. The species epithet orientalis refers to its eastern distribution.

== Description ==
Calogaya orientalis has a distinct thallus that is primarily reduced to a thalline exciple, setting it apart from other species within Calogaya. This characteristic is reminiscent of certain Athallia species. Specifically, when growing on moss (muscicolous), C. orientalis is virtually identical in appearance to the alpine A. saxifragarum. On bark (corticolous), it closely mirrors A. cerinelloides. However, distinctions arise in the ascospores—the reproductive spores found within the lichen's fruiting structures. C. orientalis has narrower ascospores and ascospore septa (the dividing walls within the spores) compared to both Athallia species.

The lichen's thallus is thin and film-like, often seen only as a white-grey rim around the apothecia (fruiting bodies). It is orange in colour, and the mature apothecia can either be flat or slightly raised. Algal cells within are spherical, and vegetative reproductive structures (diaspores) are not present. The disc of the apothecia is flat to slightly raised, and in mature structures, it has an uneven surface.

The structural attributes are defined with precise measurements. The thalline exciple (the protective ring around the apothecia) can be seen in younger specimens, and is orange in colour, later becoming less visible. Cortex, the protective outer layer, has a distinctive cell structure. The true exciple, the tissue layer surrounding the hymenium (spore-producing layer), is persistently yellow to yellow-orange. The hypothecium, the tissue below the hymenium, is generally colourless or faintly greyish at the base. The hymenium itself is colourless and has some extracellular oil drops. Paraphyses (sterile structures in the hymenium) display branching and have external anthraquinone pigments. Asci, the structures that contain spores, are of the Teloschistes type and 8-spored. Ascospores are generally ellipsoid in shape, but occasionally, rhomboid-shaped ones can be observed.

== Habitat and distribution ==
All collections of the lichen have been made in steppe or desert habitats in Iran, Turkey, and Northwestern China. Specimens have been found growing on rock outcrops (both calcareous and volcanic), and others on the bark of shrub twigs or tree bark. Calogaya orientalis has been recorded growing at altitudes ranging from 810–2,840 m (2,660–9,320 ft).
