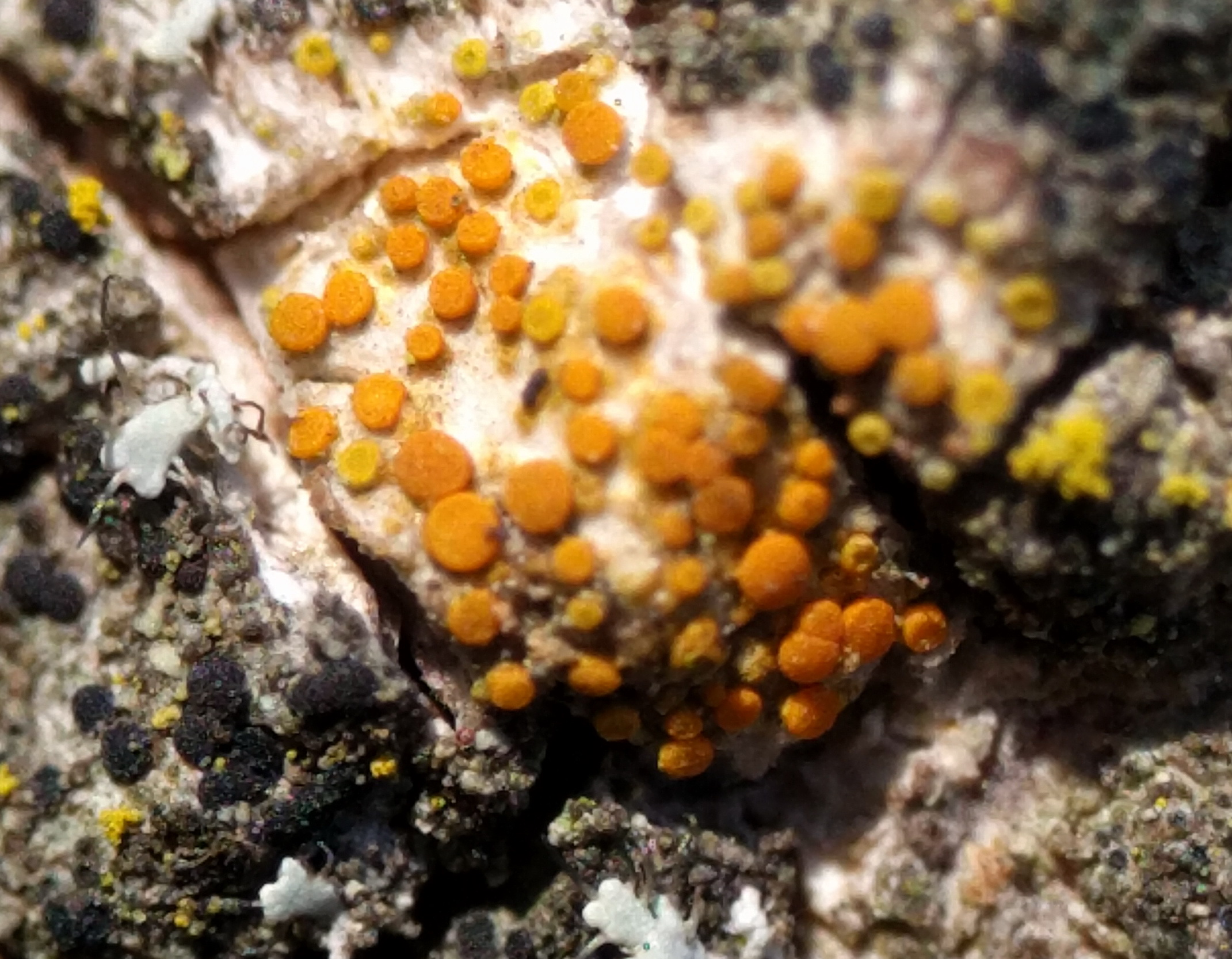

Scientific classification
- Kingdom: Fungi
- Division: Ascomycota
- Class: Lecanoromycetes
- Order: Teloschistales
- Family: Teloschistaceae
- Genus: Athallia
- Species: A. cerinella

Binomial name
- Athallia cerinella (Nyl.) Arup, Frödén & Søchting (2013)

Synonyms
- List: Lecanora cerinella Nyl. (1866); Callopisma cerinellum (Nyl.) Walt.Watson (1885); Caloplaca cerinella (Nyl.) Flagey (1896); Placodium cerinellum (Nyl.) Vain. (1899); Caloplaca cerina subvar. cerinella (Nyl.) Boistel (1903); Lecidea cerinella (Nyl.) Hue (1913); Caloplaca cerinella f. aggregata Szatala (1956)

= Athallia cerinella =

Species of lichen-forming fungus

Athallia cerinella is a species of bark-dwelling lichen in the family Teloschistaceae. It has a thin, pale grey thallus that is often almost invisible, with small, crowded, pale yellow to orange apothecia (fruiting bodies) typically less than 0.4 mm across. The species grows mainly on the bark of deciduous trees such as ash, elder, and poplar, often on twigs and small branches in nutrient-enriched habitats. It is widespread across Europe and has also been reported from the Americas and Australasia. In the field it is virtually indistinguishable from the similar Athallia cerinelloides, but differs microscopically in having 12–16 ascospores per ascus rather than eight.

== Taxonomy ==
The species was originally described by William Nylander in 1866 as Lecanora cerinella, from bark of Robinia in the Bois de Boulogne (Paris, France). He distinguished it from similar forms in the Lecanora subfusca complex by its comparatively thick, jointed paraphyses and larger spores. In later treatments, the taxon was transferred to several genera, including Callopisma, Caloplaca, Placodium, and Lecidea. A Hungarian form, Caloplaca cerinella f. aggregata (described from bark of Acer tataricum), was later shown by re-examination of the holotype to represent typical C. cerinella and is therefore treated as a synonym.

An internal transcribed spacer-based study of the Caloplaca holocarpa group in the Nordic countries placed Caloplaca cerinella in a small clade with C. holocarpa, C. vitellinula and C. pyracea. Although C. cerinella is morphologically indistinguishable in the field from Athallia cerinelloides, the two are not closely related. In a 2013 molecular revision of Teloschistaceae, Ulf Arup, Patrik Frödén and Ulrik Søchting transferred the species to Athallia as Athallia cerinella, reflecting its placement in that genus rather than in Caloplaca in the broad sense.

== Description ==
The thallus is usually very thin and may be largely endophloeodal (developing within the bark), forming a smooth, white to grey, crustose layer that is often almost immersed in the substrate or present only as small patches among other lichens. It lacks a distinct cortex, and dried material may develop surface crystals and take on a slightly waxy appearance. The apothecia are minute (typically up to about 0.3–0.4 mm across) and are often closely grouped or contiguous. The exciple is persistent and pale to yellow, while the disc is flat and pale yellow to orange, only rarely becoming deeper orange.

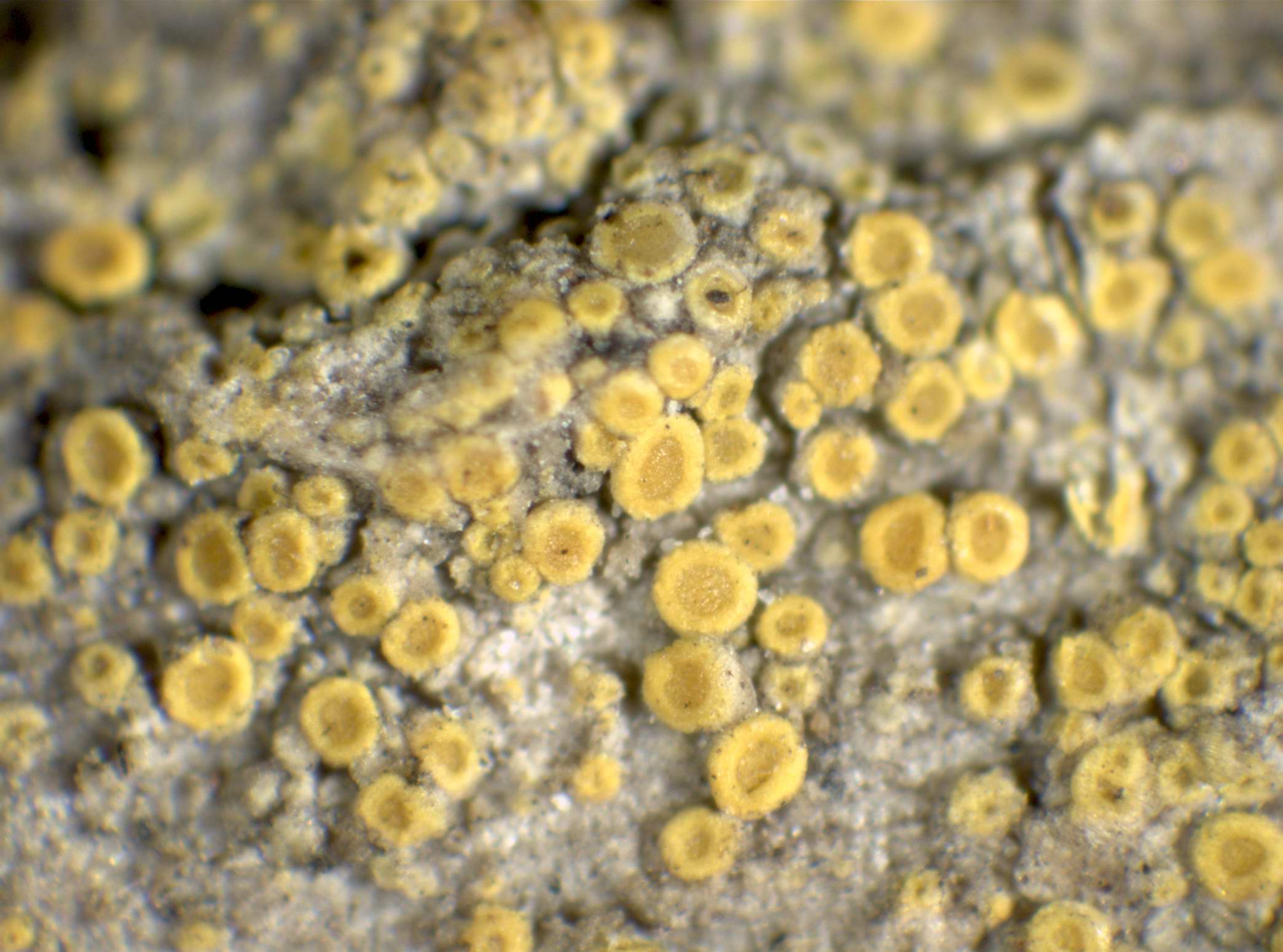
Athallia cerinella on bark, showing the pale grey thallus and crowded yellow-orange apothecia

The hymenium is about 70–90 μm thick and the hypothecium about 40–65 μm; pycnidia are rarely observed and conidia have not been seen. The paraphyses have broadened tips (to about 6 μm). The asci are usually 12–16-spored (sometimes 8-spored), and the ellipsoidal ascospores measure about 10–13 × 6–7 μm, with a septum 3–5 μm thick that is typically about one-quarter to one-half of the spore length. Spot tests have been reported as K− on the thallus, with the apothecial margin and disc K+ (purple). The main secondary metabolite is parietin, accompanied by smaller amounts of other anthraquinones (including emodin and teloschistin).

In the field, Athallia cerinella can closely resemble the similar Athallia cerinelloides; the two are usually separated by microscopy, as A. cerinella typically has 12–16 ascospores per ascus, whereas A. cerinelloides has eight.

== Habitat and distribution ==
Athallia cerinella is a bark-dwelling species recorded on trees and shrubs across Europe, and it has also been reported from the Americas, Australia, and New Zealand. In Britain and Ireland it grows on bark, especially on twigs and small branches of Fraxinus and Sambucus nigra, in nutrient-rich epiphytic communities, especially those of the Xanthorion (a community of bark-dwelling lichens, often on trees influenced by dust or bird droppings); it was once considered scarce there but is probably under-recorded, with many recent finds. It was recorded as new to Latvia in 2016. In the Nordic countries it occurs mainly on deciduous trees, especially Fraxinus, Populus and Sambucus, usually on branches in open to semi-open habitats such as forest edges, gardens and open woodland. It is often found with Athallia pyracea, Lecania cyrtella and Lecidella elaeochroma, and is largely confined there to the hemiboreal and nemoral zones.

In the Netherlands, the species grows on twigs and small branches of deciduous trees such as Sambucus (elder), poplar, and ash, and it occurs in the epiphytic lichen community known as the Lecanoretum sambuci. It was long known there only from collections made before 1910 and was treated as extinct in 20th-century and early 21st-century checklists, but it was later reported again from Amersfoort (Utrecht), growing on a relatively young lime (Tilia) planted in 1990; the author suggested it may have arrived with nursery stock. It has been recorded again since 2006 and is now known from more than 70 mapped grid squares ("atlas blocks") in the Netherlands. In a Dutch survey of 51 fallen poplar branches selected for the presence of Athallia pyracea, A. cerinella was recorded from most samples (94%), often alongside Xanthoria parietina and Lecania cyrtella. In Germany, the species has been recorded from north-east Hesse, where it was found during lichen surveys in autumn 2024 at several localities between about 290–435 m elevation. Athallia cerinella is widespread in the Alps, where it is common on Sambucus and Juglans. Although it usually grows on bark, DNA-based surveys in central Germany have also detected A. cerinella on leaves of Quercus robur; such foliage records may reflect inconspicuous stages (for example mycelium or spores) rather than well-developed thalli.

Lichenicolous (lichen-dwelling) fungi reported growing on Athallia cerinella include Lichenodiplis lecanorae and Marchandiomyces corallinus.
