= Caloplaca nothoholocarpa =

Scientific classification
- Kingdom: Fungi
- Division: Ascomycota
- Class: Lecanoromycetes
- Order: Teloschistales
- Family: Teloschistaceae
- Genus: Caloplaca
- Species: C. nothoholocarpa

Binomial name
- Caloplaca nothoholocarpa S.Y.Kondr. & Hur (2020)
- Holotype site: Patagonia, Chile

Species of lichen

Caloplaca nothoholocarpa is a species of saxicolous (rock-dwelling), crustose lichen in the family Teloschistaceae. It is found in Chile.

== Taxonomy ==
The species was formally described by the lichenologists Sergey Kondratyuk and Jae-Seoun Hur in 2020. The type specimen was collected in Chile, specifically from the areas around Lake Balmaceda and Lake Pinto in Patagonia, a region close to the seaside. This specimen was found growing on rock, cohabiting with other lichens, namely Caloplaca nothocitrina and an unidentified Caloplaca species. The species name nothoholocarpa alludes to its distribution in the Southern Hemisphere and its resemblance to Athallia holocarpa, a species found in the Northern Hemisphere.

== Description ==
Caloplaca nothoholocarpa has a thallus that can extend up to 1.5–2 cm in diameter or form larger aggregations. The thallus presents in shades of greyish, whitish, or whitish-grey, often appearing dull orange or brownish-orange due to the profusion of apothecia. Under high magnification, the thallus appears either continuous or areolate, with areoles measuring 0.2–0.8 mm across. These areoles, separated by cracks up to 0.04 mm wide, can be indistinct, often being completely obscured by apothecia or showing signs of exfoliation. The upper surface of the thallus is typically whitish or whitish-grey, occasionally with yellowish spots or verrucae, which are likely young apothecia.

The apothecia of Caloplaca nothoholocarpa are quite numerous and typically aggregate, measuring 0.15–0.6 mm in diameter. In cross-section, they are 0.12–0.2 mm thick. Each areole generally hosts 2–5 apothecia. These apothecia are rounded or irregular in shape, initially lecanorine or immersed in the thallus, but predominantly become biatorine and sessile. The margin of the apothecia is very thin, dull yellow or dull yellow-orange, contrasting with the disc's dull brownish-yellow or brownish-orange colour. The true exciple of the apothecia is 30–40 μm thick, paraplectenchymatous with a matrix and cell lumina of 3–4 μm in diameter.

The hymenium of the lichen ranges from 30 to 75 μm in height, and the paraphyses are almost not swollen towards the tips. The subhymenium is relatively thin, about 30–40 μm thick, containing numerous oil droplets and irregular oil aggregations. Asci typically contain 8 spores, including 4 bipolarilocular and 4 simple abortive spores. The ascospores are fusiform (threadlike), slightly wider at the equatorial part, measuring 12–15 by 5–8 μm in water and slightly larger in potassium hydroxide (K) solution.

In terms of its chemical properties, the epihymenium of Caloplaca nothoholocarpa reacts K+ by turning purple or somewhat blackish-purple, eventually becoming crimson.

== Similar species ==
Caloplaca nothoholocarpa is similar to Athallia holocarpa. It is distinguished by several key features: it has smaller apothecia, a whitish hypothallus, longer ascospores measuring 13–15 by 6–8 μm (as opposed to 10–13 by 6–8 μm in Athallia holocarpa), and a somewhat narrower ascospore septum, ranging from 2.5 to 3.5 μm (compared to 3–6 μm in Athallia holocarpa).

Historically, convex and large apothecia, reaching up to 1.3 mm in diameter, have been noted as characteristic of Southern Hemisphere specimens of Caloplaca holocarpa according to Øvstedal and Lewis Smith. In contrast, the material of C. nothoholocarpa aligns more closely with species such as Gondwania sublobulata, Austroplaca johnstonii, and Caloplaca schofieldii, all of which are quite distinct from Athallia holocarpa.

== See also ==
- List of Caloplaca species
