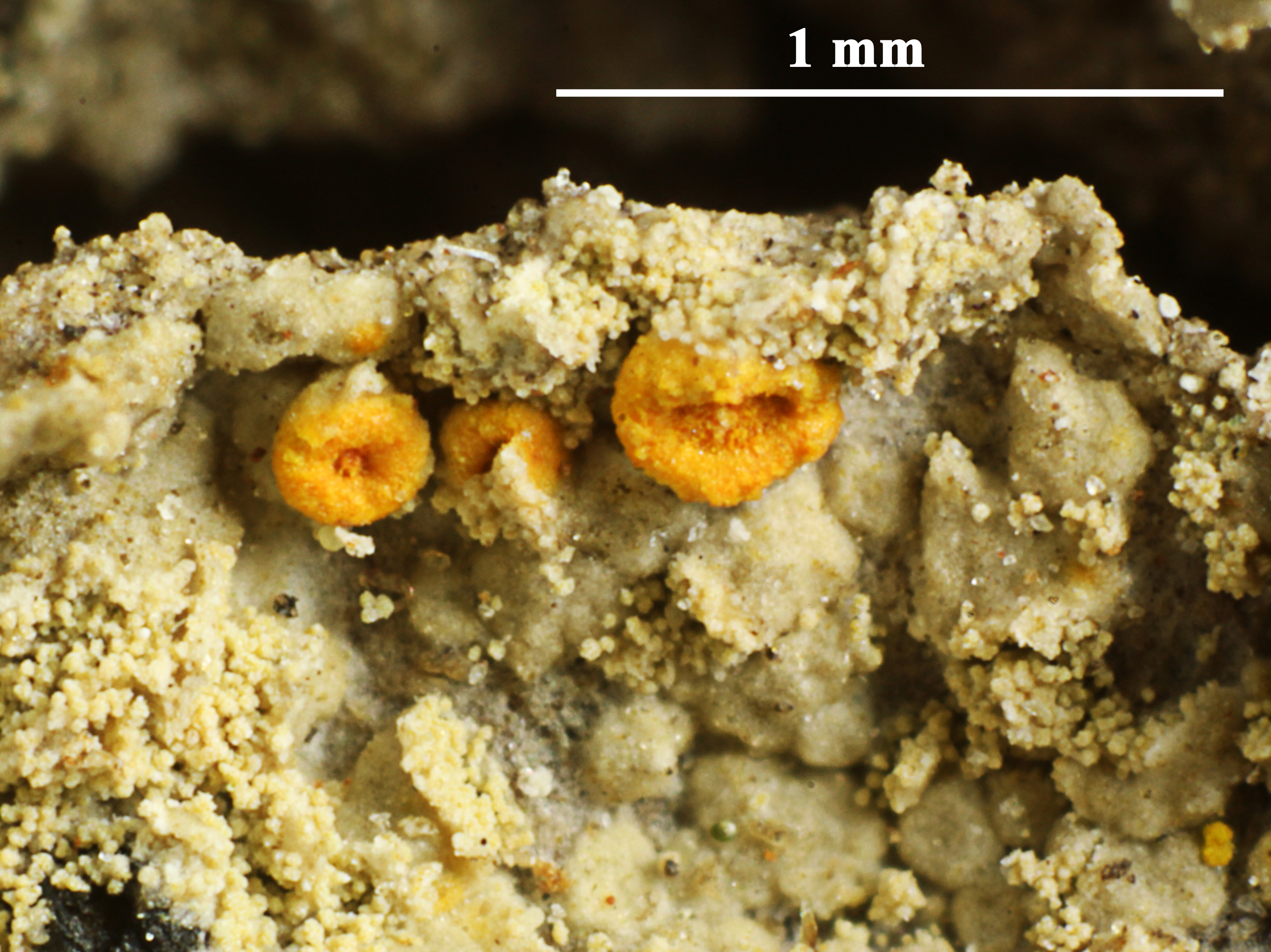
- Closeup of apothecia of Coppinsiella ulcerosa

Scientific classification
- Kingdom: Fungi
- Division: Ascomycota
- Class: Lecanoromycetes
- Order: Teloschistales
- Family: Teloschistaceae
- Genus: Coppinsiella; S.Y.Kondr. & Lőkös (2018)

Type species
- Coppinsiella ulcerosa (Coppins & P.James) S.Y.Kondr. & Lőkös (2018)

Species
- C. extremiorientalis C. fiumana C. orbicularis C. substerilis C. ulcerosa

= Coppinsiella =

Genus of lichens

Coppinsiella is a genus of lichen-forming fungi in the family Teloschistaceae. It contains five species of corticolous and saxicolous (bark- and rock-dwelling) crustose lichens with a distribution in Europe, Asia, and North America. Coppinsiella bears resemblance to the genus Athallia, but it is distinguished by its more developed thallus, typically featuring distinctive crater-like soralia and zeorine-form apothecia (fruiting bodies), which lack a thalline margin.

== Taxonomy ==
The genus was circumscribed by the lichenologists Sergey Kondratyuk and László Sándor Lőkös in 2018 to contain three species previously considered as part of the "Caloplaca ulcerosa" species group. An additional species found in North America and Austria, named Caloplaca aff. ulcerosa, is thought to belong to the genus but has not yet been formally described. Additional species were proposed for inclusion in 2022. The genus name honours the British lichenologist Brian J. Coppins, who originally co-authored and formally described the type species.

Coppinsiella is in the subfamily Xanthorioideae of the family Teloschistaceae. The genus is somewhat similar in morphology to Athallia but has a more developed thallus, crater-like soralia, and zeorine apothecia.

== Description ==
Genus Coppinsiella characterised by a crustose thallus, which is very thin and film-like. This thallus can be more or less continuous, and it tends to be either embedded within the substrate (endolithic) or within the bark of trees (endophloeodal). It may also appear minutely squamulose, with a grey to whitish colouration. When the thallus is yellowish, it reacts to a potassium hydroxide solution (i.e., the K spot test) by turning violet (K+ violet).

Soralia, which are structures used for asexual reproduction, are scattered across the thallus. These can range from hardly noticeable to well-developed, immersed, and crater-like. They may also be irregular and confluent, sometimes forming on the margins of the thalline squamules (small, scale-like parts of the thallus) or within crevices in the substrate. The soredia, which are granular clusters of algal cells and fungal filaments produced by the soralia, are light greenish-grey and lack a greenish-blue pigment.

The apothecia (fruiting bodies) are either zeorine (lacking a thalline margin) or biatorine (having a thalline margin) in form. The thalline margin is thin and grey-whitish, tending to disappear over time. The apothecia have their own margin that is the same colour as the disc, which ranges from orange to bright orange and can be concave, flat, or convex. Coppinsiella has asci (spore-bearing cells) containing eight spores each. The ascospores are hyaline (translucent), bipolarilocular (having two compartments separated by a septum with a perforation), widely ellipsoid, and have a wide septum.

In terms of chemistry, the thallus, soralia, and soredia are either non-reactive to potassium hydroxide (K−) if they are greenish-white or greyish-white, or they turn violet (K+ violet) if yellowish. The apothecia react to potassium hydroxide by turning purple (K+ purple).

== Habitat and distribution ==
Coppinsiella species primarily thrive on the bark of various deciduous trees, including species such as Ulmus (elms), Fraxinus (ashes), Tilia (lindens), and Acer (maples). Additionally, it can be found growing on the stems of steppe and maritime shrubs, often Limonium species. This genus often favours environments that are well-lit and polluted. It is also known to grow on limestone surfaces. Coppinsiella ulcerosa has a marked preference for coastal regions, whereas other species within the genus tend to have a more continental distribution.

Geographically, Coppinsiella is predominantly found across Eurasia, ranging from Scotland, Southern Scandinavia, and Estonia in the north to the Mediterranean regions, extending from Spain to the Caspian Sea coast in the east, and reaching as far south as Israel. The genus also has a presence in North Africa and has been recorded in North America, though these recorded occurrences are less reliable. There are also some less certain records of Coppinsiella from the Southern Hemisphere.

== Species ==
- Coppinsiella extremiorientalis I.V.Frolov, Yakovcz. & A.Ezhkin (2022) – Russian Far East
- Coppinsiella fiumana (Zahlbr.) I.V.Frolov (2022) – Europe
- Coppinsiella orbicularis (Moniri, Vondrák & Malíček) S.Y.Kondr. & Lőkös (2018) – Europe
- Coppinsiella substerilis (Vondrák, Palice & van den Boom) S.Y.Kondr. & Lőkös (2018) – Europe
- Coppinsiella ulcerosa (Coppins & P.James) S.Y.Kondr. & Lőkös (2018)

Ivan Frolov and Ilya Prokopiev formally proposed Coppinsiella fiumana as a new combination to replace Coppinsiella orbicularis in 2022.
