= Fominiella =

Scientific classification
- Domain: Eukaryota
- Kingdom: Fungi
- Division: Ascomycota
- Class: Lecanoromycetes
- Order: Teloschistales
- Family: Teloschistaceae
- Genus: Fominiella; S.Y.Kondr., Upreti & Hur (2017)

Type species
- Fominiella tenerifensis S.Y.Kondr., Kärnefelt, A.Thell & T.Feuerer (2017)

Species
- F. skii F. tenerifensis

Genus of lichens

Fominiella is a genus of lichen-forming fungi in the family Teloschistaceae. It contains two species with a thin, film like and inconspicuous thallus.

== Taxonomy ==
The genus Fominiella was proposed in 2017 by the lichenologists Sergey Kondratyuk, Dalip Kumar Upreti, and Jae-Seoun Hur. Their molecular phylogenetic analysis revealed several monophyletic branches in the phylogenetic tree of the family Teloschistaceae. One of these new branches was occupied by a species known only from the Canary Islands, which was named Fominiella tenerifensis and assigned as the type species of the genus. The species then known as Caloplaca skii was also included in the genus on the basis of DNA analysis. The genus name honours the Ukrainian botanist Aleksandr Vasiljevich Fomin, who specialised in cryptogams.

Fominiella is in the subfamily Xanthorioideae of the family Teloschistaceae. It is somewhat similar to two other genera in that subfamily that also have very reduced thalli: Athallia and Xanthocarpia. In 2013, Ulf Arup and colleagues had proposed Caloplaca skii for inclusion in Athallia.

== Description ==
Fominiella encompasses two species of lichen with a thin, film-like thallus that is often not immediately noticeable, with colours that range from whitish to light grey or pale yellowish. These lichens lack a developed hypothallus, which is a layer below the main body of the thallus.

The reproductive structures, known as apothecia, vary from zeorine to lecanorine or biatorine in form. The apothecia have a yellow-orange disc with a margin that is always a lighter yellow, creating a distinct contrast between the margin and the disc. The thalline exciple, which is the layer surrounding the apothecial disc, can be white, greyish, or yellow-white in colour. This exciple may either disappear over time or remain, and the true exciple is described as being leptodermatous and paraplectenchymatous, indicating it is thin and composed of tightly interwoven cells.

Fominiella produces asci that contain eight spores each. The ascospores are polarilocular and hyaline, meaning they have two chambers and are transparent. The chemical composition of these lichens includes parietin as the major secondary metabolite (lichen product), with emodin, parietinic acid, fallacinal, and teloschistin present in trace amounts.

== Species ==
- Fominiella skii (Khodos., Vondrák & Šoun) S.Y.Kondr., Upreti & Hur (2017) – Asia; Europe
- Fominiella tenerifensis S.Y.Kondr., Kärnefelt, A.Thell & Feuerer (2017) – Canary Islands
