= Fominiella skii =

Scientific classification
- Kingdom: Fungi
- Division: Ascomycota
- Class: Lecanoromycetes
- Order: Teloschistales
- Family: Teloschistaceae
- Genus: Fominiella
- Species: F. skii

Binomial name
- Fominiella skii (Khodos., Vondrák & Šoun) S.Y.Kondr., Upreti & Hur (2017)
- Type locality: Taman Peninsula, Russia

Synonyms
- Caloplaca skii Khodos., Vondrák & Šoun (2011); Athallia skii (Khodos., Vondrák & Šoun) Arup (2013)

Species of lichen-forming fungus

Fominiella skii is a species of crustose lichen in the family Teloschistaceae. It forms a very thin, pale greyish crust on bark and twigs, bearing small yellow-orange fruiting bodies. The species was originally described in 2011 as Caloplaca skii and has since been transferred to the genus Fominiella. It occurs in dry coastal and semi-arid habitats in southern Europe and the Near East.

== Taxonomy ==
Fominiella skii was originally described as Caloplaca skii in 2012 by Alexander Khodosovtsev, Jan Vondrák and Jan Šoun, based on material collected on the Taman Peninsula (Black Sea coast of Russia) on stems of Artemisia growing on coastal sand dunes. The authors reported that internal transcribed spacer (ITS) DNA sequences from multiple collections are nearly identical and form a well-supported clade, which in their analysis was most closely related to Caloplaca saxifragarum (now Athallia saxifragarum). The species epithet honours the Ukrainian lichenologist Sergey Kondratyuk.

In 2017, Kondratyuk and colleagues established the genus Fominiella for this lineage and made the new combination Fominiella skii; the species has also been treated as Athallia skii in earlier DNA-based classifications. In their three-gene phylogeny, Fominiella was placed outside the then-recognized subfamilies of Teloschistaceae, and the authors noted that additional multi-gene sequence data from the same specimen would help clarify its position.

== Description ==
The lichen forms a very thin, film-like thallus that is often easiest to see only around the fruiting bodies. It is whitish to light grey or pale yellowish and lacks a distinct prothallus and cortex. The apothecia are dispersed and small (typically about 0.2–0.5 mm wide), with a flat to slightly convex yellow-orange disc and a paler yellow rim. The thalline margin is most evident in young apothecia, while mature apothecia are sessile and only weakly constricted at the base.

Microscopically, the asci contain eight spores, and the ascospores are polarilocular and narrowly ellipsoid, measuring about 7.5–12.8 × 3.5–6.5 μm. Asexual reproductive structures have not been reported. The lichen contains the orange anthraquinone parietin as its main secondary metabolite, with small amounts of emodin and several related compounds. In terms of standard cemical spot tests, the apothecia react K+ (purple) and are UV+ (orange-red), while the thallus is usually K− and C− (though pale yellow parts may turn purple with K).

== Habitat and distribution ==
Fominiella skii grows mainly on bark and twigs of shrubs in dry lowland habitats, especially close to sea shores. It has been recorded from a range of xerophytic shrubs (including species of Artemisia, Thymus, and others), and it can also occur over plant debris or old bones in arid and semi-arid sites.

The species has a southern distribution in Europe, with records from Bulgaria, Greece, Romania, Spain, southern Russia, and Ukraine, and it is also known from Turkey. More broadly it has been characterised as occurring in arid and semiarid parts of southern and southeastern Europe and the Near East.
