= Athallia subrotundispora =

Scientific classification
- Kingdom: Fungi
- Division: Ascomycota
- Class: Lecanoromycetes
- Order: Teloschistales
- Family: Teloschistaceae
- Genus: Athallia
- Species: A. subrotundispora

Binomial name
- Athallia subrotundispora Stepanchikova, Himelbrant & I.V.Frolov (2025)
- Type locality: Bering Island, Russian Far East

Species of lichen-forming fungus

Athallia subrotundispora is a species of crustose lichen in the family Teloschistaceae. It was described as new to science in 2025 from collections made in the Bering Island in the Commander Islands of the Russian Far East. The lichen has a thin, inconspicuous body but produces abundant orange fruiting structures, and is distinguished from related species by its unusually broad, almost spherical spores. It has been found growing on both rocks and driftwood in tundra and coastal habitats.

== Taxonomy ==
Athallia subrotundispora was described as a new species in 2025 by Irina Stepanchikova, Dmitry Himelbrant and Ivan Frolov, based on material collected on Bering Island in the Commander Islands (Russian Far East). The type specimen came from gravel tundra at about 115 m elevation, where it was found on siliceous rocks. The species epithet subrotundispora refers to the unusually broad, almost rounded ascospores. In an internal transcribed spacer (ITS)-based phylogeny, the species is placed within Athallia but without a clear sister species; it grouped (without strong support) with two undescribed Athallia lineages reported from Greece. The authors reported both a saxicolous (rock-dwelling) and a driftwood-inhabiting collection; despite differences in outward appearance, the specimens had identical ITS sequences and were treated as the same species.

== Description ==
This is a crustose lichen that can be hard to see when sterile, because the thallus is often poorly developed and tends to appear mainly as tiny greenish areoles around the fruiting bodies. On driftwood the thallus may be partly embedded in the wood, showing as a pale border around the apothecia, whereas rock-growing material may develop an ochre prothallus between or at the edge of closely packed apothecia. Apothecia are typically abundant and crowded. Their discs are orange, with a paler yellow to yellow-orange rim, while the greyish thalline margin is usually most evident on the underside.

Microscopically, the asci usually contain eight colourless, polarilocular spores that are broadly ellipsoid to nearly spherical, typically 14–16 micrometres (μm) long and 10–11 μm wide (though occasionally ranging from 12.5 to 18.5 μm long and 8 to 12 μm wide), with a relatively thick septum (often around 6–7 μm). Pycnidia were not observed in the studied material. In spot tests, the apothecial tissues react K+ (purple), consistent with anthraquinones; chemically, parietin was reported as the main secondary metabolite with a small amount of emodin. In the field it may resemble the common Athallia holocarpa on the Commander Islands, but differs by having broader, larger ascospores, and (in its saxicolous form) larger apothecia and a better-developed ochre prothallus.

== Habitat and distribution ==
The species is known from only two collections on Bering Island, one from gravel tundra (on a siliceous stone at about 115 m) and the other from the coastal zone (on driftwood at the edge of the supralittoral). Reported associates include tundra species such as Lecanora polytropa and Pseudephebe pubescens, and, on coastal driftwood, taxa including Caloplaca caesiorufella, Lecanora orae-frigidae, Physcia dubia and Polycauliona candelaria. Given its rarity and the limited number of records, its wider distribution beyond Bering Island remains uncertain.
