= Calogaya haloxyli =

Scientific classification
- Kingdom: Fungi
- Division: Ascomycota
- Class: Lecanoromycetes
- Order: Teloschistales
- Family: Teloschistaceae
- Genus: Calogaya
- Species: C. haloxyli

Binomial name
- Calogaya haloxyli Moniri, Shahidin & Vondrák (2018)
- Holotype site: Dzungaria basin desert

Species of lichen

Calogaya haloxyli is a species of epiphytic, squamulose lichen in the family Teloschistaceae. Found in Northeast China and Iran, it was formally described as a new species in 2018 by Mahroo Moniri, Hurnisa Shahidin, and Jan Vondrák. The type specimen was collected from the Dzungaria basin desert at an altitude of 439 m (1,440 ft), where it was found growing on the stems of old Haloxylon persicum plants. The species epithet refers to the genus of its host. At the time of its publication, the lichen had been recorded from the Dzungaria basin and Tian Shan Mountains in China, and once in northeastern Iran. It is found at elevation ranges between 430 and 2,710 m (1,410 and 8,890 ft).
