= Calogaya altynenis =

Scientific classification
- Domain: Eukaryota
- Kingdom: Fungi
- Division: Ascomycota
- Class: Lecanoromycetes
- Order: Teloschistales
- Family: Teloschistaceae
- Genus: Calogaya
- Species: C. altynenis

Binomial name
- Calogaya altynenis Shahidin (2018)

Species of lichen

Calogaya altynenis is a species of corticolous (bark-dwelling), crustose lichen in the family Teloschistaceae. It is found in a few alpine desert locations in Northwestern China, where it grows on old Pamirian winterfat shrubs.

== Taxonomy ==
The lichen was formally described as a new species in 2018 by Hurnisa Shahidin. The type specimen was collected from the Kunlun Mountains (Karakoram) at an altitude of 3,840 m (12,600 ft), where it was found growing on twigs of old Krascheninnikovia ceratoides shrubs. The species epithet, originally spelled by the authors as altynis, is the genitive case of the noun Altyn; this refers to the Altyn, a mountain range in the geographical range of the lichen. The spelling of the epithet was later corrected to altynenis.

== Description ==
The thallus of Calogaya altynenis is orange to grey in colour and consists of scattered areoles or granules–sometimes barely conspicuous–around dispersed apothecia that are zeorine in form. Blastidia (rounded granule-like propagules) occur on the fringes of the areoles, or as granules on the substrate; they are about 30–50 μm in diameter. The apothecia have flat to concave discs that are dark orange to orange in colour, ringed by a thin, light orange thalline exciple. The ascospores, which number eight per ascus, are polarilocular, and measure 10–17 by 5–7 μm.

== Habitat and distribution ==
At the time of its publication, Krascheninnikovia ceratoides was known to occur in three location in the Altyn-Tagh and Karakorum Mountains, at altitudes ranging between 3,730 and 4,160 m (12,240 and 13,650 ft).
