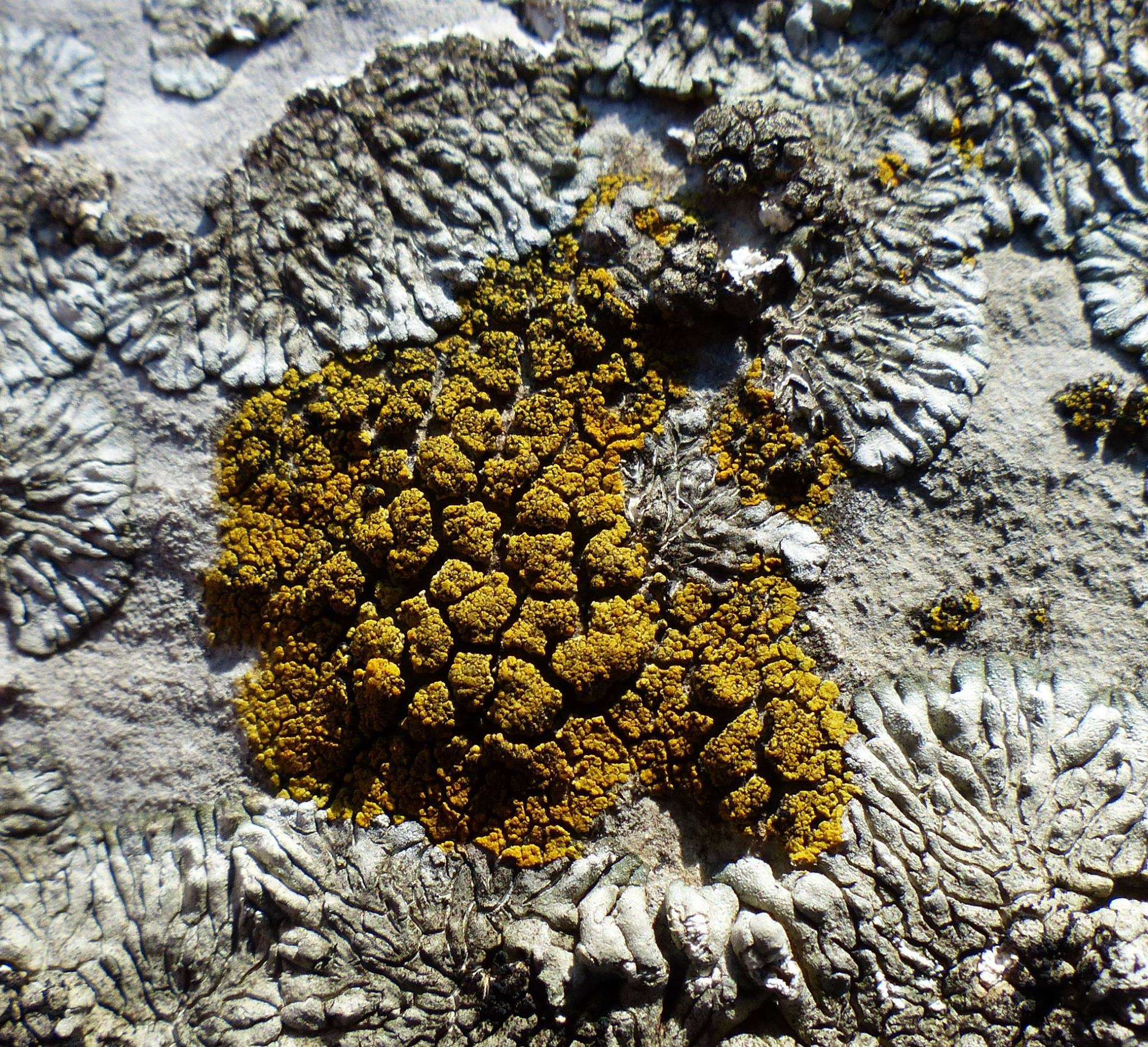
- In Trieste, Italy

Scientific classification
- Kingdom: Fungi
- Division: Ascomycota
- Class: Lecanoromycetes
- Order: Teloschistales
- Family: Teloschistaceae
- Genus: Athallia
- Species: A. inconnexa

Binomial name
- Athallia inconnexa (Nyl.) S.Y.Kondr. & Lőkös (2018)

Synonyms
- List: Lecanora inconnexa Nyl. (1883); Caloplaca lobulata var. inconnexa (Nyl.) Boistel (1903); Caloplaca inconnexa (Nyl.) Zahlbr. (1930); Caloplaca tenuatula subsp. inconnexa (Nyl.) Clauzade & Cl.Roux (1985); Caloplaca inconnexa var. verrucariarum Clauzade & Cl.Roux (1976); Caloplaca tenuatula subsp. verrucariarum (Clauzade & Cl.Roux) Clauzade & Cl.Roux (1985)

= Athallia inconnexa =

Species of lichen-forming fungus

Athallia inconnexa is a species of saxicolous (rock-dwelling) crustose lichen in the family Teloschistaceae. It typically grows as a parasite on other crustose lichens on limestone surfaces. The species is widely distributed in Europe and has also been recorded from Morocco and Brazil.

== Taxonomy ==
The lichen was first described by the Finnish lichenologist William Nylander in 1883, as Lecanora inconnexa, based on material he collected in 1853 on dolomitic rocks near Montpellier, France. In the protologue, Nylander compared it with Lecanora lobulata (now Seawardiella lobulata) and characterised it by often scattered, egg-yolk-yellow, slightly scalloped (non-radiating) thallus granules, spores 11–14 × 6–7 μm and bacilliform conidia 3.0–3.5 × 0.5–0.6 μm, placing it in the Lecanora citrina group (now Flavoplaca citrina). Alexander Zahlbruckner transferred it to Caloplaca in 1930. In 2018, Sergey Kondratyuk and László Lőkös reclassified it in Athallia, a genus characterized by its poorly developed thallus.

== Habitat and distribution ==
Athallia inconnexa is a calcicolous, non-aquatic species that grows on limestone, most often as a parasite on other crustose lichens. It has been reported on Acarospora cervina, Circinaria calcarea, Staurothele ambrosiana, and other heavily degraded thalli.

Athallia inconnexa is widely distributed in Europe. Some countries in which it has been documented include Germany, Romania, Spain, and Turkey. It has also been recorded from Brazil and Morocco. In a survey of Spanish locations, Athallia inconnexa occurred on exposed calcareous walls, spurs, and summit outcrops close to the waterline (about 42–150 cm above it), with its best development in the flood-influenced bank zone between dry rock and fully terrestrial habitats; when it colonizes riverbeds that dry out in summer, it may remain in contact with water for longer. It has been recorded from well-lit localities at 580–1,480 m elevation, and is described as frequent in Spain.
