= Calogaya alaskensis =

Scientific classification
- Domain: Eukaryota
- Kingdom: Fungi
- Division: Ascomycota
- Class: Lecanoromycetes
- Order: Teloschistales
- Family: Teloschistaceae
- Genus: Calogaya
- Species: C. alaskensis

Binomial name
- Calogaya alaskensis (Wetmore) Arup, Frödén & Søchting (2013)

Synonyms
- Caloplaca alaskensis Wetmore (2004)

Species of lichen

Calogaya alaskensis is a species of crustose lichen in the family Teloschistaceae. It was first described as new to science in 2004 by Clifford Wetmore, who placed it in the genus Caloplaca. Ulf Arup and colleagues transferred the taxon to Calogaya in 2013 following a molecular phylogenetics-led restructuring of the Teloschistaceae.

Native to the high Arctic regions, especially in northern Alaska, this lichen is characterized by its distinctive areolate thallus that is pale orange in hue. The areoles are discrete and convex, measuring between 0.1 and 0.5 mm in diameter. Soralia, which are orange, originate from the centers of these areoles and eventually occupy them entirely. Although the apothecia are infrequently seen, when present, they are round, flat, and have an orange-colored disk, with diameters measuring around 0.4 μm. Within the asci, there are typically 8 spores, each with two locules and dimensions of 11.0–14.0 by 7.0 μm with an isthmus of 4.0 μm. Distinguishing features of Caloplaca alaskensis include the particular formation of its soralia and its discrete convex areoles.

This species, found both on wood, bark, and rock in high Arctic areas, has often been mistaken for other species like Solitaria chrysophthalma and Leproplaca cirrochroa due to similarities but can be differentiated by several morphological attributes. Although its primary occurrences are noted in Alaska, it may be more broadly distributed in the high Arctic regions of Canada.
