= Calogaya xanthoriella =

Scientific classification
- Domain: Eukaryota
- Kingdom: Fungi
- Division: Ascomycota
- Class: Lecanoromycetes
- Order: Teloschistales
- Family: Teloschistaceae
- Genus: Calogaya
- Species: C. xanthoriella

Binomial name
- Calogaya xanthoriella Shahidin (2018)

Species of lichen

Calogaya xanthoriella is a species of corticolous (bark-dwelling), crustose lichen in the family Teloschistaceae. It is found in Northwestern China and Turkey.

== Taxonomy ==
The lichen was formally described as a new species in 2018 by Hurnisa Shahidin. The type specimen was collected by the author from Tuoli (Xinjiang) at an altitude of 1,450 m (4,760 ft), where it was found growing on the twigs of Berberis heteropoda. The species epithet xanthoriella refers to the thallus shape, which is similar to a tiny Xanthoria.

== Description ==
Calogaya xanthoriella resembles a small rosette with short, flat lobes, yellow to greenish yellow in colour. Its apothecia are lecanorine or zeorine in form, with flat to concave orange discs covered with yellow pruina. Its ascospores, which number eight per ascus, are more or less ellipsoid in shape, measuring 9–14 by 4–7 μm.

== Habitat and distribution ==
In addition to the central Tian Shan Mountains of China, Calogaya xanthoriella has also been recorded from the mountains of continental Turkey. The lichen grows at altitude ranges between 900 and 2,050 m (2,950 and 6,730 ft). It has been found growing on the bark of Berberis, Lonicera, and Malus sieversii, as well as on weathered wood. It is one of 12 Calogaya species included on a 2021 checklist of lichens in Xinjiang.
