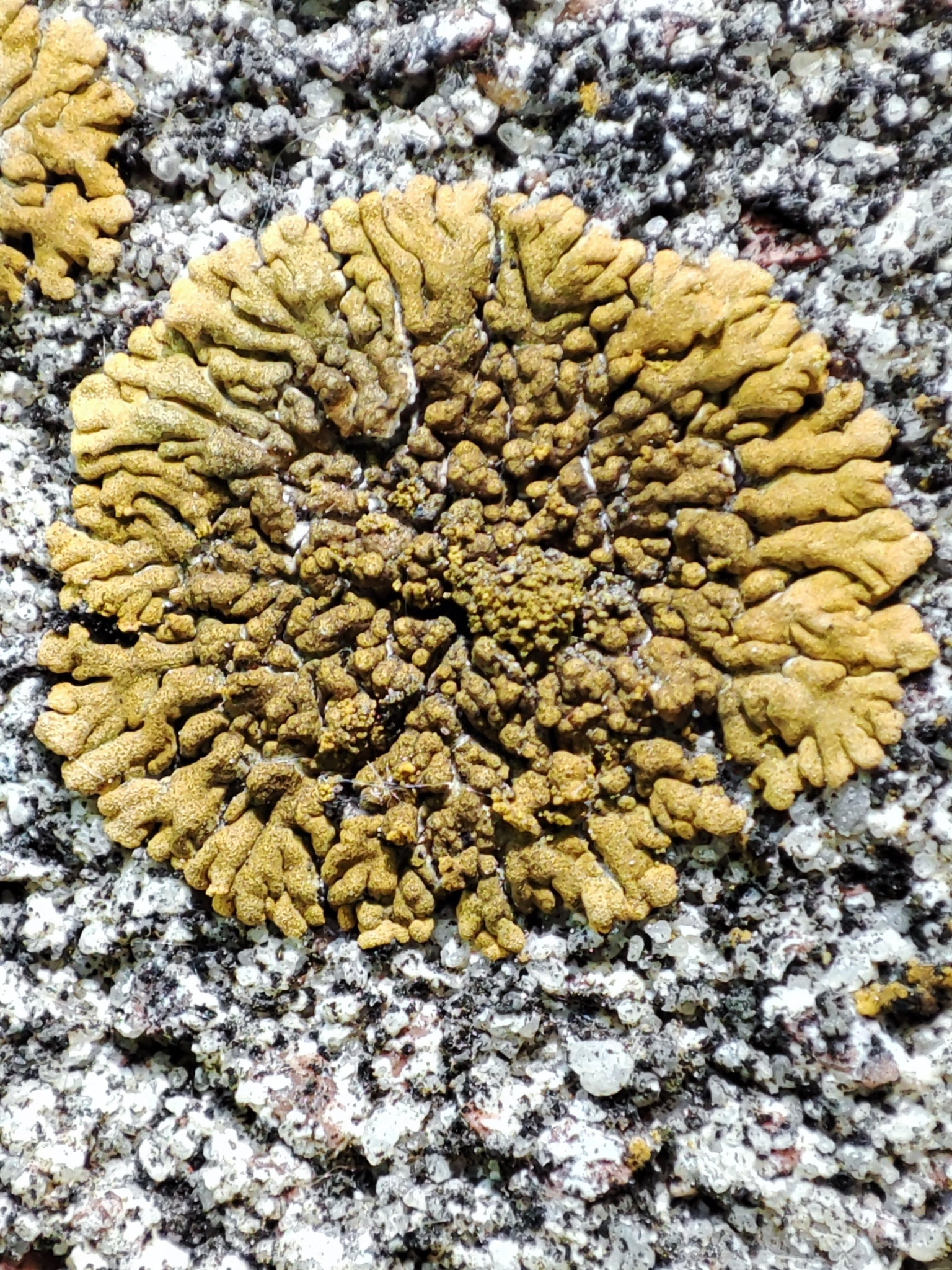

Conservation status
- Apparently Secure (NatureServe)

Scientific classification
- Domain: Eukaryota
- Kingdom: Fungi
- Division: Ascomycota
- Class: Lecanoromycetes
- Order: Teloschistales
- Family: Teloschistaceae
- Genus: Calogaya
- Species: C. decipiens

Binomial name
- Calogaya decipiens (Arnold) Arup, Frödén & Søchting (2013)

Synonyms
- List: Physcia decipiens Arnold (1867); Lecanora decipiens (Arnold) Nyl. (1868); Amphiloma murorum var. decipiens (Arnold) Rabenh. (1869); Caloplaca aurantiaca var. decipiens (Arnold) Trevis. (1869); Placodium decipiens (Arnold) Leight. (1871); Lecanora murorum var. decipiens (Arnold) Wedd. (1873); Lecanora murorum subvar. decipiens (Arnold) Wedd. (1876); Amphiloma decipiens (Arnold) Bagl. (1879); Gasparrinia decipiens (Arnold) P.Syd. (1887); Lecanora murorum subsp. decipiens (Arnold) Cromb. (1894); Caloplaca murorum var. decipiens (Arnold) Herre (1910); Caloplaca murorum subsp. decipiens (Arnold) Sandst. (1912); Lecanora murorum subsp. decipiens (Arnold) Nyl. ex A.L.Sm. (1918); Caloplaca decipiens (Arnold) Blomb. & Forssell (1931); Calogaya decipiens subsp. esorediata Moniri & Vondrák (2018)

= Calogaya decipiens =

Species of lichen

Calogaya decipiens is a species of saxicolous (rock-dwelling), crustose lichen in the family Teloschistaceae. It was first scientifically described in 1867 by German lichenologist Ferdinand Christian Gustav Arnold, as a member of the genus Physcia. Ulf Arup and colleagues transferred the taxon to the genus Flavoplaca in 2013, following a molecular phylogenetics-based restructuring of the family Teloschistaceae.
