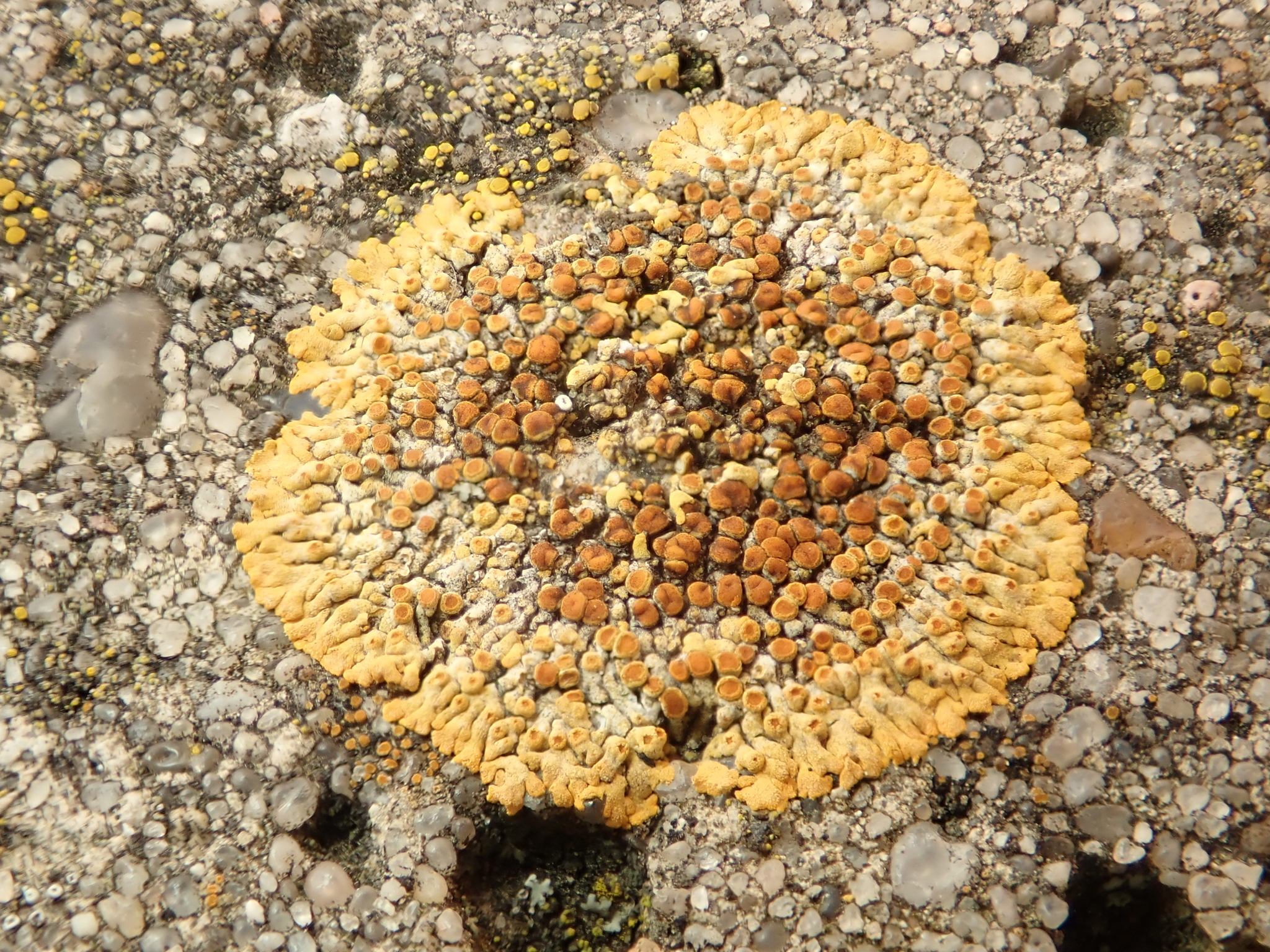
- growing on a rock in Berlin, Germany

Scientific classification
- Kingdom: Fungi
- Division: Ascomycota
- Class: Lecanoromycetes
- Order: Teloschistales
- Family: Teloschistaceae
- Genus: Calogaya
- Species: C. pusilla

Binomial name
- Calogaya pusilla (A.Massal.) Arup, Frödén & Søchting (2013)

Synonyms
- Physcia pusilla A.Massal. (1852); Amphiloma pusillum (A.Massal.) Körb. (1859); Placodium pusillum (A.Massal.) Anzi (1860); Teloschistes pusillus (A.Massal.) Trevis. (1869); Gasparrinia pusilla (A.Massal.) P.Syd. (1887); Caloplaca murorum var. pusilla (A.Massal.) Sandst. (1912); Caloplaca pusilla (A.Massal.) Zahlbr. (1926)

= Calogaya pusilla =

Species of lichen

Calogaya pusilla is a species of saxicolous (rock-dwelling), crustose lichen in the family Teloschistaceae. Calogaya pusilla is common in Europe, and has been recorded from a few locations in the United States. Its typical habitat is on vertical, calcareous rock surfaces. It also occurs on walls with mortar.

== Taxonomy ==
It was originally formally described in 1852 by Italian lichenologist Abramo Bartolommeo Massalongo, who placed it in genus Physcia. The type specimen was collected in Veneto, Italy. It has undergone several changes of genus in its taxonomic history, including transfers to Caloplaca, Placodium, and Teloschistes. In 2013, it was placed in the newly circumscribed genus Calogaya.

== Description ==
Calogaya pusilla is a small but visually striking lichen that forms neat, rosette-shaped growths measuring 1–3 centimetres in diameter. The thallus (main body of the lichen) appears yellow to orange, occasionally with a pinkish tint, and grows closely attached to its substrate. Around the edge, the lichen forms short, broad, flattened lobes about 2 mm long and 1.5 mm wide. These lobes are typically convex and swollen, giving them a plump appearance, and may be divided by small furrows. A distinctive feature of this species is the frequent presence of a white, powdery coating (pruina) on the surface of the lobes.

The central area of the lichen consists of convex granules that are often obscured by numerous apothecia (fruiting bodies). These disc-shaped apothecia can reach up to 1.0 mm in diameter and are typically densely crowded in the central portion of the lichen. When young, each apothecium has a flat, orange to brownish-orange disc surrounded by a noticeable yellow to orange rim (exciple). As the apothecium matures, the disc becomes convex and the rim becomes less prominent.

Under the microscope, the spore-producing structures reveal further identifying features. The tips of the sterile filaments (paraphyses) within the apothecia are swollen, measuring 6–8 micrometres (μm) in diameter. The spores (ascospores) are ellipsoidal, measuring 10–15 μm long by 5–7 (occasionally 8) μm wide, with a cross-wall (septum) that is 2–4 μm thick, occupying approximately one-fourth to one-fifth of the spore's length.

When tested with potassium hydroxide solution (K), both the thallus and apothecia turn purple, which is a key chemical characteristic for identifying this species.
