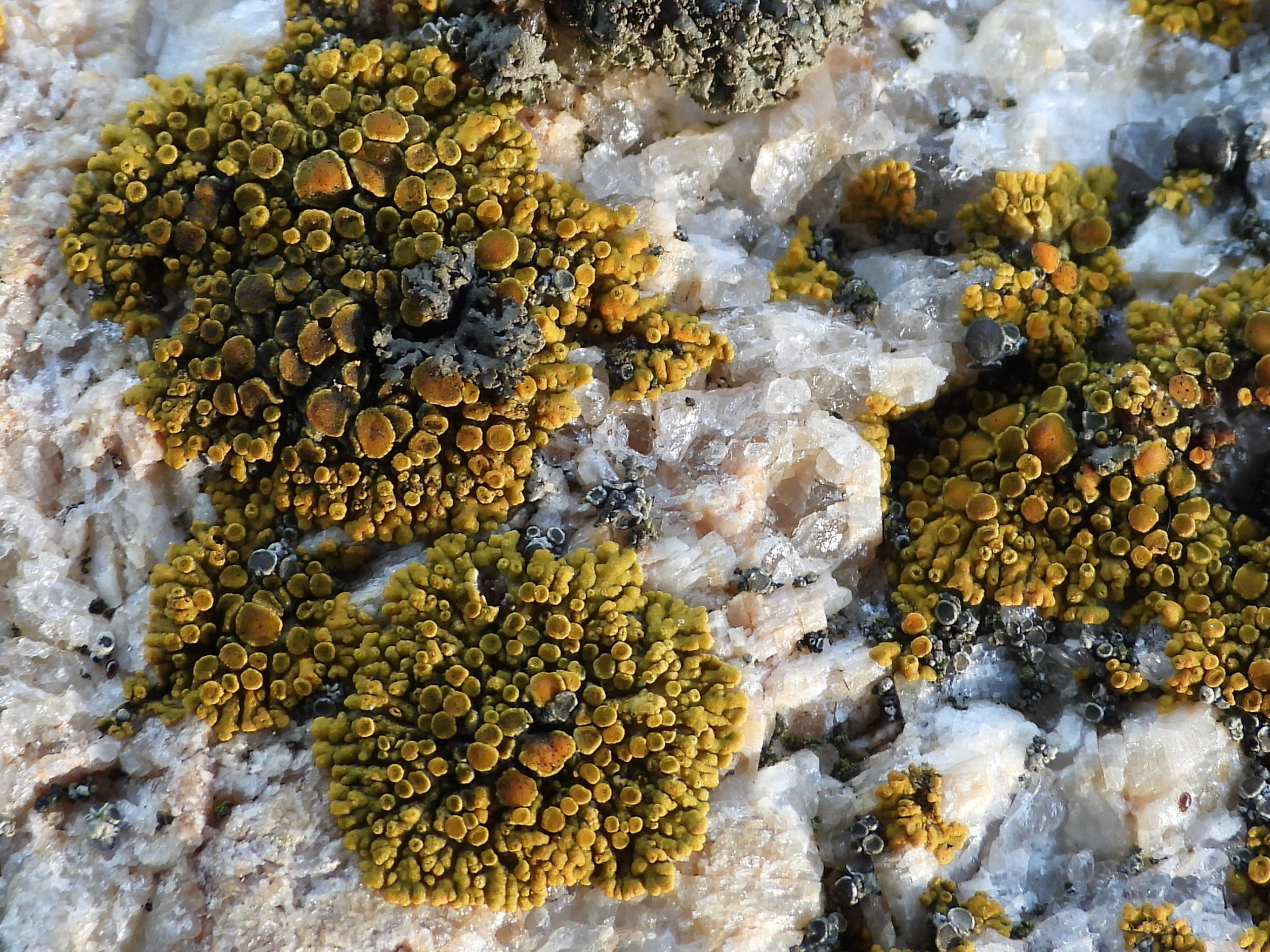

Conservation status
- Vulnerable (NatureServe)

Scientific classification
- Domain: Eukaryota
- Kingdom: Fungi
- Division: Ascomycota
- Class: Lecanoromycetes
- Order: Teloschistales
- Family: Teloschistaceae
- Genus: Athallia
- Species: A. scopularis

Binomial name
- Athallia scopularis (Nyl.) Arup, Frödén & Søchting (2013)

Synonyms
- List: Physcia scopularis (Nyl.) Arnold (1884); Placodium murorum var. scopulare (Nyl.) Elenkin (1904); Placodium scopulare (Nyl.) H.Olivier (1909); Caloplaca scopularis (Nyl.) Lettau (1912); Gasparrinia murorum var. scopularis (Nyl.) Mereschk. (1913); Gasparrinia scopularis (Nyl.) Oxner (1990)

= Athallia scopularis =

Species of lichen

Athallia scopularis is a species of saxicolous (rock-dwelling), crustose lichen in the family Teloschistaceae. It was first formally described by Finnish lichenologist William Nylander in 1883 as a member of the genus Lecanora. After having been shuffled to several genera in its taxonomic history, it was transferred to the genus Athallia in 2013 following a molecular phylogenetics-led restructuring of the Teloschistaceae. This lichen grows on sun-lit seaside siliceous rocks, particularly those covered with guano from resting birds. It has been recorded from the Atlantic coasts of North America, Northern Europe, and Greenland.
