= Nemoral =

Eurasian forest biome

In general nemoral means "pertaining to groves or woodland". Its origin is related to the Latin word "nemus" (stem: "nemor-"), meaning a grove of trees.

It is especially used to label a type of biome (vegetation zone), which is in the temperate zone of Eurasia and has broad-leaved forests. According to the Walter classification system, it has a moderate temperate climate with short frost periods and is characterized by frost-resistant deciduous forests.
