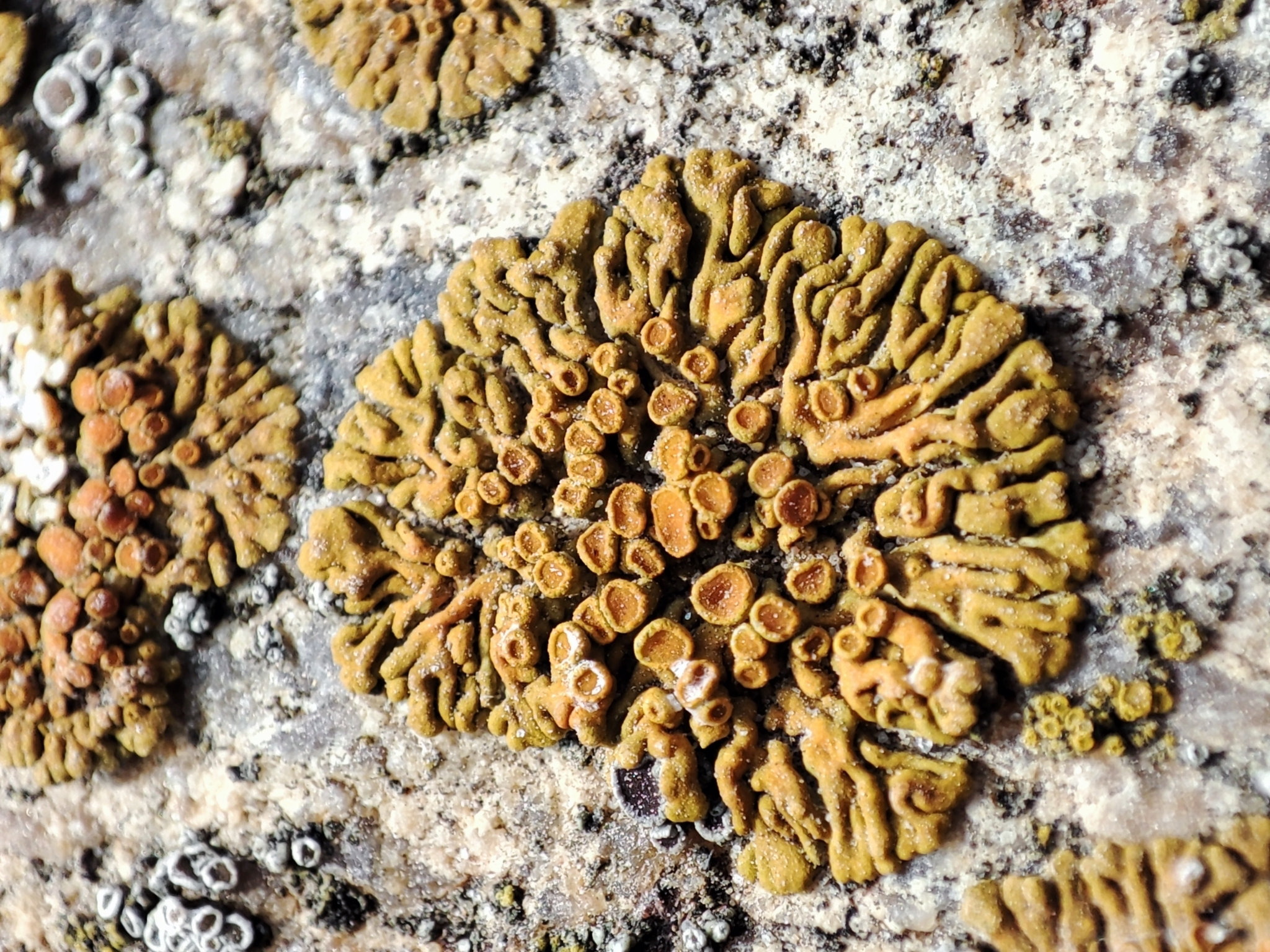
- The rock jewel lichen, Calogaya saxicola

Scientific classification
- Domain: Eukaryota
- Kingdom: Fungi
- Division: Ascomycota
- Class: Lecanoromycetes
- Order: Teloschistales
- Family: Teloschistaceae
- Genus: Calogaya; Arup, Frödén & Søchting (2013)

Type species
- Calogaya biatorina (A.Massal.) Arup, Frödén & Søchting (2013)

Synonyms
- Amphiloma (Fr.) Körb. (1855); Caloplaca sect. Amphiloma (Fr.) Jatta (1900); Degelia sect. Amphiloma (Fr.) P.M.Jørg. & P.James (1990); Gasparrinia Tornab. (1848); Lazarenkoella S.Y.Kondr. (2015); Pannaria sect. Amphiloma (Fr.) Stizenb. (1862); Parmelia sect. Amphiloma Fr. (1825); Pectenia P.M.Jørg., L.Lindblom, Wedin & S.Ekman (2014)

= Calogaya =

Genus of lichens

Calogaya is a genus of lichen-forming fungi belonging to the family Teloschistaceae. It has 19 species. The genus was circumscribed in 2013 by Ulf Arup, Ulrik Søchting, and Patrik Frödén. The generic name Calogaya ("spectacular Gaya") honours Dr. Ester Gaya (fl. 2001), a Spanish botanist from the University of Barcelona.

== Species ==
- Calogaya alaskensis (Wetmore) Arup, Frödén & Søchting (2013)
- Calogaya altynenis Shahidin (2018) – China
- Calogaya arnoldii (Wedd.) Arup, Frödén & Søchting (2013)
- Calogaya arnoldiiconfusa (Gaya & Nav.-Ros.) Arup, Frödén & Søchting (2013)
- Calogaya biatorina (A.Massal.) Arup, Frödén & Søchting (2013)
- Calogaya bryochrysion (Poelt) Vondrák (2016)
- Calogaya decipiens (Arnold) Arup, Frödén & Søchting (2013)
- Calogaya ferrugineoides (H.Magn.) Arup, Frödén & Søchting (2013)
- Calogaya haloxyli Moniri, Shahidin & Vondrák (2018) – China
- Calogaya mogoltanica (S.Y.Kondr. & Kudratov) S.Y.Kondr., Kärnefelt, Elix, A.Thell, Jung Kim, M.H.Jeong, N.N.Yu, A.S.Kondr. & Hur (2014)
- Calogaya orientalis Moniri, Shahidin, Halıcı & Vondrák (2018) – China
- Calogaya pusilla (A.Massal.) Arup, Frödén & Søchting (2013)
- Calogaya qinghaiensis B.G.Lee & Hur (2018)
- Calogaya safavidiorum (S.Y.Kondr.) S.Y.Kondr. & Lőkös (2018)
- Calogaya saxicola (Hoffm.) Vondrák (2016)
- Calogaya schistidii (Anzi) Arup, Frödén & Søchting (2013)
- Calogaya xanthoriella Shahidin (2018) – China
- Calogaya xinjiangensis Shahidin (2018) – China
- Calogaya zoroasteriorum (S.Y.Kondr., Kärnefelt, A.Thell, Elix, Jung Kim, A.S.Kondr. & Hur) Moniri & Vondrák (2018)
