= Philipp Franz Wilhelm von Zwackh-Holzhausen =

German botanist and mycologist

Philipp Franz Wilhelm von Zwackh-Holzhausen (1826 – 1903) was a German botanist and mycologist.

From 1850 until 1894 he edited his extensive exsiccata series Lichenes exsiccati distributing around 1200 numbers of specimens among herbaria.
