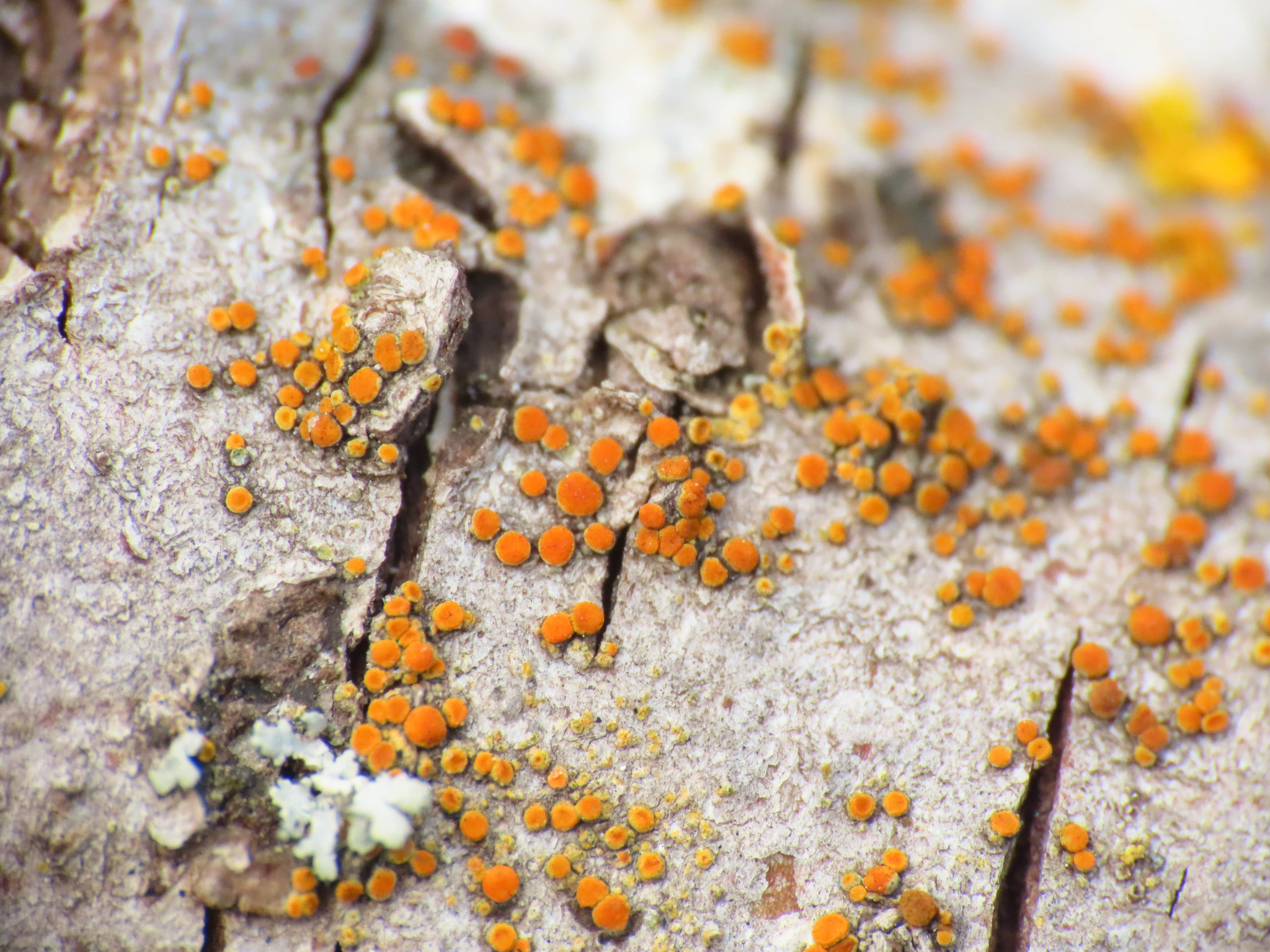

Scientific classification
- Kingdom: Fungi
- Division: Ascomycota
- Class: Lecanoromycetes
- Order: Teloschistales
- Family: Teloschistaceae
- Genus: Athallia
- Species: A. pyracea

Binomial name
- Athallia pyracea (Ach.) Arup, Frödén & Søchting (2013)

Synonyms
- List: Parmelia cerina var. pyracea Ach. (1803); Lecidea pyracea (Ach.) Schultz (1806); Lecidea luteoalba var. pyracea (Ach.) Ach. (1808); Lichen luteoalbus * pyracea (Ach.) Lam. (1813); Biatora luteoalba var. pyracea (Ach.) Steud. & Hochst. (1826); Biatora aurantiaca [unranked] pyracea (Ach.) Ljungst. (1826); Biatora aurantiaca var. pyracea (Ach.) Fr. (1826); Parmelia cerina f. pyracea (Ach.) Fr. (1831); Zeora cerina var. pyracea (Ach.) Flot. (1849); Lecanora cerina f. pyracea (Ach.) Nyl. (1857); Lecanora cerina var. pyracea (Ach.) Nyl. (1857); Lecanora pyracea (Ach.) Nyl. (1861); Caloplaca pyracea (Ach.) Zwackh (1862); Lecanora luteoalba var. pyracea (Ach.) Malbr. (1868); Placodium pyraceum (Ach.) Anzi (1868); Placodium cerinum var. pyraceum (Ach.) Branth & Rostr. (1869); Callopisma pyraceum (Ach.) Stein (1879); Placodium cerinum f. pyraceum (Ach.) Tuck. (1882); Lecidea rupestris var. pyrithroma Ach. (1808); Lichen rupestris * pyrithroma (Ach.) Lam. (1813); Patellaria rupestris var. pyrithroma (Ach.) Duby (1830); Biatora rupestris var. pyrithroma (Ach.) Fr. (1845); Lecanora pyracea f. pyrithroma (Ach.) Nyl. (1864); Lecanora pyracea subvar. pyrithroma (Ach.) Wedd. (1869); Lecanora pyracea var. pyrithroma (Ach.) Leight. (1879); Callopisma luteoalbum var. pyrithroma (Ach.) Arnold (1879); Callopisma pyraceum var. pyrithroma (Ach.) Müll.Arg. (1880); Callopisma pyraceum f. pyrithroma (Ach.) Arnold (1881); Lecanora pyrithroma (Ach.) T.P.Brisson (1881); Caloplaca pyracea var. pyrithroma (Ach.) Flagey (1888); Lecanora pyracea subsp. pyrithroma (Ach.) Nyl. (1896); Placodium pyraceum var. pyrithromum (Ach.) A.L.Sm. (1918); Placodium cerinum var. pyrithroma (Ach.) Räsänen (1936); Callopisma cerinum var. pyrithroma (Ach.) Räsänen (1947); Caloplaca lithophila var. pyrithroma (Ach.) B.de Lesd. (1949); Caloplaca pyracea f. pyrithroma (Ach.) Erichsen (1957)

= Athallia pyracea =

Species of lichen-forming fungus

Athallia pyracea is a species of crustose lichen in the family Teloschistaceae. It forms a very thin, often inconspicuous greyish crust on bark, with scattered to crowded orange fruiting bodies typically 0.3–1.0 mm across. The species grows mainly on the nutrient-enriched bark of deciduous trees such as aspen, poplar, and ash and is considered a nitrophilous (nitrogen-loving) lichen. It is widespread in temperate regions of the Northern Hemisphere, occurring across Europe, North America, and parts of Asia. The yellow and orange parts of the thallus and apothecia turn purple when treated with potassium hydroxide (the K spot test). The species was transferred to Athallia in 2013 as part of a molecular reclassification of the Teloschistaceae.

== Taxonomy ==
Athallia pyracea was originally described by Erik Acharius in his 1803 work Methodus qua omnes detectos lichenes, as Parmelia cerina var. pyracea. It was characterized as a greyish crust on tree bark (especially on Populus tremula) with minute orange apothecia that become slightly convex and have a grey to yellowish margin. Acharius also remarked that it is only weakly distinct from var. cerina and that the crust tends to darken with age.

After Acharius's introduction, the taxon was repeatedly recombined as lichen classification shifted through the 19th century, moving among several genera used for crustose lichens with orange apothecia. It appeared early on in Lecidea and Lecanora (often as a variety, form, or later as Lecanora pyracea), and was also treated in segregate concepts such as Biatora, Placodium, and Callopisma, reflecting changing ideas about which characters mattered most for generic placement. From the later 1800s onward it was largely treated under the name Caloplaca pyracea and its close variants, a reclassification that had been suggested by the German mycologist Philipp Franz Wilhelm von Zwackh-Holzhausen in 1862. A parallel "pyrithroma" line (first described by Acharius in 1808 as a variety of the lichen now known as Protoblastenia rupestris) was later linked back to pyracea and handled at various ranks under Lecanora, Placodium, Callopisma, and Caloplaca. In mid-20th-century British treatments, the name usage around this complex was still unsettled. Arthur Wade (1965), treating the species under Caloplaca, regarded C. pyracea as a synonym of C. holocarpa and argued that holocarpa had nomenclatural priority because it traces back to Lichen holocarpus (1798), predating the earliest species-rank use of "pyracea" (1806). He also regarded the "pyrithroma" element as a largely upland expression within the same continuum, remarking that intermediates occur and that there was little basis for keeping it distinct.

In a later (2013) reclassification of the xanthorioid lichens, Ulf Arup, Patrik Frödén and Ulrik Søchting split several reduced-thallus species out of the broad traditional concept of Caloplaca and proposed the new genus Athallia for a well-supported monophyletic lineage within the subfamily Xanthorioideae (family Teloschistaceae). In their circumscription, Athallia includes species that typically have a poorly developed thallus (or lack an obvious thallus altogether), a weak or amorphous cortex when present, mostly zeorine apothecia, and polarilocular spores with a medium to long septum; chemically, the species share the "chemosyndrome A" anthraquinone pattern. On this basis they made the new combination Athallia pyracea for Acharius's taxon, treating it as the appropriate name for the species that had long been known as Caloplaca pyracea and explicitly linking the combination back to the original Acharius basionym and type.

== Description ==
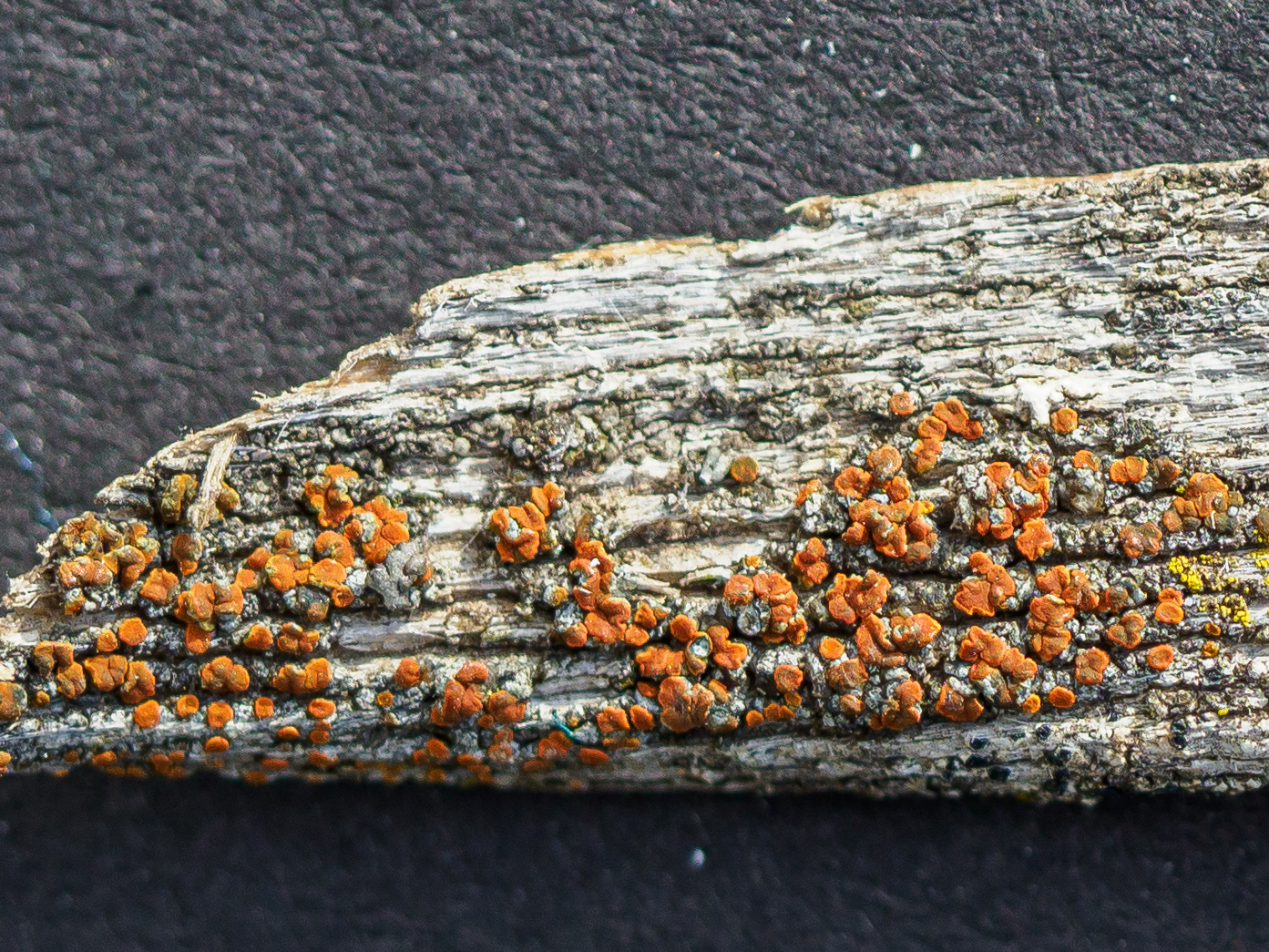
Athallia pyracea forming scattered orange apothecia on weathered bark

Athallia pyracea forms a very thin, crustose thallus on bark that is sometimes partly immersed in the substrate. The surface is flat to slightly warty (verruculose) and often cracked (rimose) into small areoles about 50–200 μm in diameter. Its colour ranges from pale greyish or greyish yellow to orange-yellow or orange; many thalli show a greyish background with scattered yellow-to-orange spots. A thin, grey prothallus may be visible at the margins. The cortex is usually weakly developed, consisting of an amorphous layer of indistinct, roughly isodiametric cells.

Apothecia are usually abundant, scattered to crowded (rarely touching), and sit adnate to sessile on the thallus. They are round to somewhat irregular and typically 0.3–1.0 mm across, with an orange disc that is flat to slightly convex. A thalline margin is generally present, though it can become excluded in some apothecia. The exciple is usually 35–50 μm thick and may be slightly raised or level with the disc; the epithecium is orange and granular. Microscopically, the hymenium is colourless and about 70–90 μm thick, with a hyaline hypothecium (about 70–100 μm thick) that is sometimes oil-inspersed. Paraphyses are unbranched or branched near the tips, with the upper cells swollen to about 4–7 μm in diameter; the asci contain eight spores. The ascospores are ellipsoid to broadly ellipsoid, typically 10–15.5 × 5.5–8 μm, and polarilocular (two-celled with a thickened septum), with the septum usually 3.8–5.5 μm thick (often about one-third to one-half of the spore length). The yellow parts of the thallus and the apothecia give a K+ (purple) reaction (turning purple with potassium hydroxide).

=== Similar species ===
Athallia pyracea can be confused with Blastenia hungarica, a species that has darker orange to ferruginous-orange apothecia that are flatter and lack the greyish thalline margin typical of A. pyracea; in addition, the thallus of B. hungarica does not develop any orange tinge.

== Habitat and distribution ==
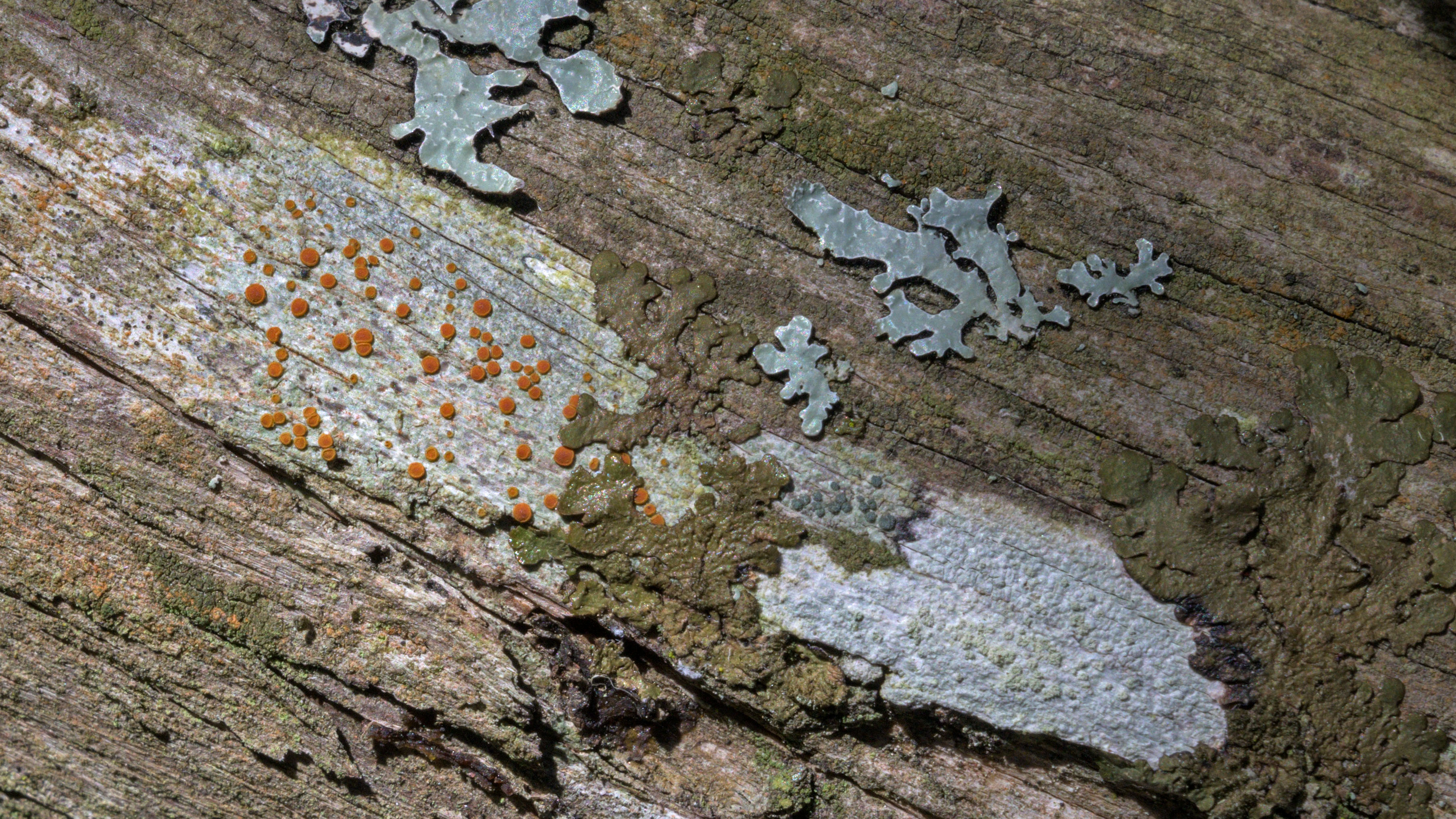
Athallia pyracea (orange apothecia) growing on weathered wood in a mixed lichen community

Athallia pyracea occurs in temperate parts of the Northern Hemisphere, with records from Europe, North America, and parts of Asia. In Great Britain it is recorded across the country and is especially frequent in the north (e.g. parts of Scotland). This lichen grows predominantly on the bark of nutrient-enriched, base-rich deciduous trees such as aspen, poplars, and ash. It only very rarely colonizes other substrates, with isolated reports of A. pyracea growing on lignum (dead wood) or even on calcareous rock outcrops.

== Ecology ==
Athallia pyracea is an epiphytic lichen that grows in nitrogen-rich environments, and it is considered a nitrophilous species preferring nutrient-enriched substrata. In Europe it often co-occurs with the similar bark-dwelling lichen Athallia cerinelloides in nitrophilous tree-bark communities. Several lichenicolous (lichen-dwelling) fungi have been documented on A. pyracea. The widespread fungus Lichenodiplis lecanorae is known to grow on the apothecia of A. pyracea. The species Trichoconis hafellneri was described in 2016 from specimens growing on A. pyracea (as well as on Xanthoria parietina).
