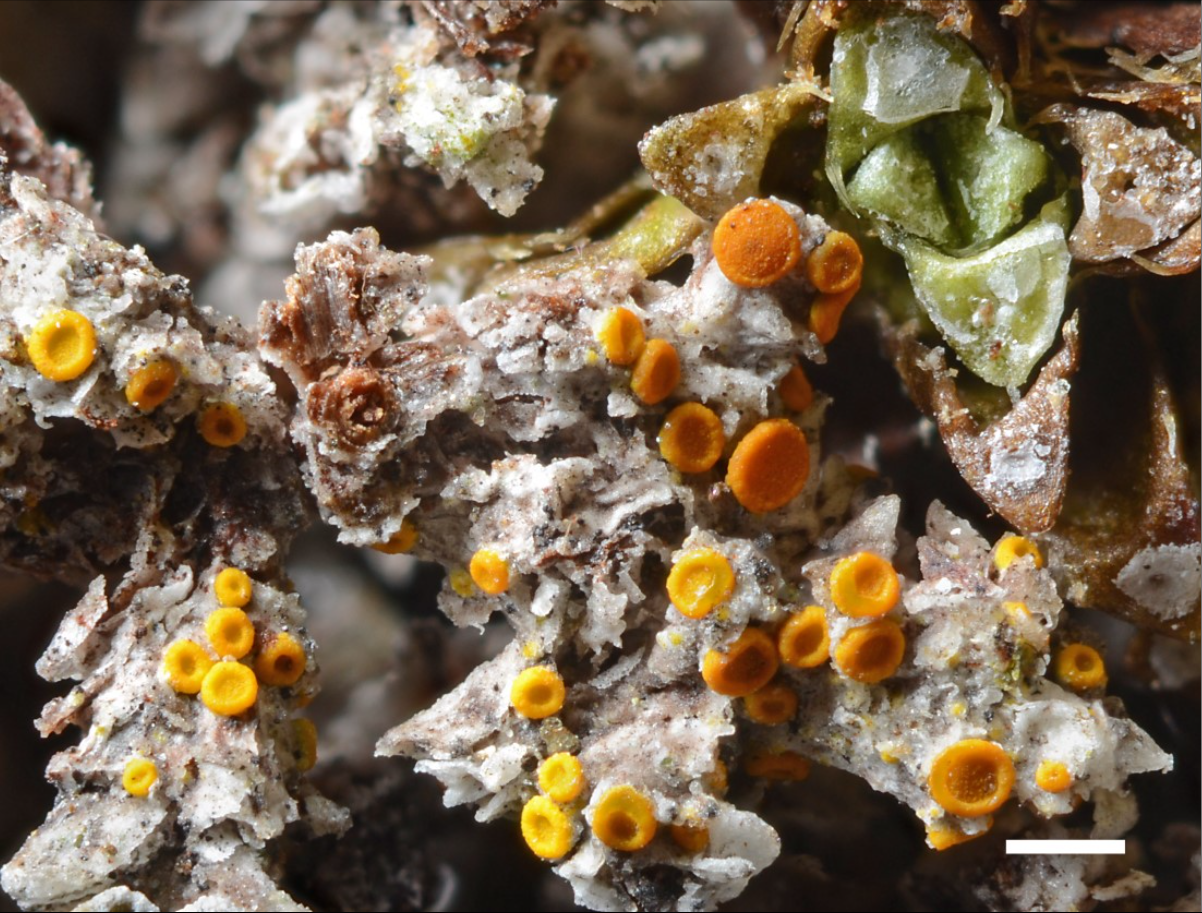
- scale bar: 0.5 mm

Scientific classification
- Kingdom: Fungi
- Division: Ascomycota
- Class: Lecanoromycetes
- Order: Teloschistales
- Family: Teloschistaceae
- Genus: Athallia
- Species: A. saxifragarum

Binomial name
- Athallia saxifragarum (Poelt) Arup, Frödén & Søchting (2013)

Synonyms
- Caloplaca saxifragarum Poelt (1955)

= Athallia saxifragarum =

Species of lichen-forming fungus

Athallia saxifragarum is a species of terricolous (ground-dwelling) crustose lichen in the family Teloschistaceae. First described by Josef Poelt in 1955 as a member of Caloplaca, it was reclassified into the genus Athallia in 2013 following molecular phylogenetics studies. This lichen is characterized by its thin white thallus and small yellowish-orange apothecia. It primarily grows on bryophytes and plant detritus, showing a particular affinity for Saxifraga species, and is typically found in calciferous or alkaline environments in Arctic and alpine regions, including Greenland, Svalbard, and the European Alps, with recent documentation in Fennoscandia. It also occurs in North America.

== Taxonomy ==
It was formally described as a new species in 1955 by Josef Poelt, who classified it as a member of the genus Caloplaca. Ulf Arup, Patrik Frödén, and Ulrik Søchting transferred it to Athallia following a molecular phylogenetics-informed reorganization of the family Teloschistaceae.

== Description ==
Athallia saxifragarum is a lichen species characterized by its thin, irregularly shaped thallus (the main body of the lichen) that grows either within the substrate (endosubstratic) or on its surface (episubstratic), appearing white. Its apothecia (fruiting bodies) are moderately abundant and somewhat clustered. These small, disc-shaped structures measure 0.2–0.7 mm in diameter and sit directly on the surface (sessile), slightly constricted at the base and pressed closely against the substrate. The apothecia are lecanorine in form, meaning they have a rim containing algal cells. The central disc is flat and yellowish-orange in colour, occasionally developing a brownish tinge as it matures, with a surface that ranges from smooth to finely granular. The margin around the disc is not prominent or wavy (not flexuose) and appears darker than the rest of the thallus, usually yellowish-orange like the disc or slightly paler, with a smooth texture.

The internal structure includes an excipulum (the outer layer of the apothecium) measuring 20–50 μm wide, with a poorly defined cortex containing few algal cells. The proper exciple is broad, composed of parallel hyphae (prosoplectenchymatous), strongly glutinized (gel-like), and colorless (hyaline). The hypothecium, which is the layer below the spore-producing layer, is 100 μm high, made up of unoriented to vertically aligned hyphae with mostly wide openings, and is colourless. The subhymenium (the layer just below the hymenium) is also colourless. The hymenium, where spores are produced, is 70–80 μm high and colorless. The paraphyses (sterile filaments among the spore-producing cells) have simple terminal cells that are swollen up to 6 μm wide and colorless, with subterminal cells up to 3 μm wide. The epihymenium (the uppermost layer of the hymenium) is distinct and yellow to yellowish-orange.

The asci (spore-containing sacs) measure approximately 50 by 17 μm. Each ascus typically contains 8 broadly ellipsoid ascospores that measure 10–12 by 6–7 μm, with a septum (dividing wall) of about 5.5 μm.

== Habitat and distribution ==
Athallia saxifragarum grows over bryophytes (mosses and liverworts) and accumulated plant detritus, often among Saxifraga species. In alpine Europe it has been reported from dead tufts of Saxifraga and from twigs of shrubs and other woody plants. In Arctic regions it is frequently recorded on Saxifraga oppositifolia (purple saxifrage) and Dryas integrifolia (mountain avens), and appears confined to calciferous or otherwise alkaline sites, in dry habitats that are open to partly shaded.

The species resembles Athallia pyracea but differs in ecology and spores: A. saxifragarum is mainly associated with plant detritus (often from Saxifraga), whereas A. pyracea is more typical of woody substrates, and A. saxifragarum has a slightly larger spore septum.

Athallia saxifragarum is known from Arctic and alpine regions, including Greenland, Svalbard and the European Alps. It was reported as new to Finland and Norway in 2014 and to Sweden in 2023, and it also occurs in North America. Sequenced material has been reported from alpine localities in the Pirin Mountains (Bulgaria), the Prokletije Mountains (Montenegro) and the Retezat Mountains (Romania). In Nepal, A. saxifragarum has been reported from 4,950 to 5,000 m elevation in a compilation of published records; this reported range lies above the tree line used in the study.
