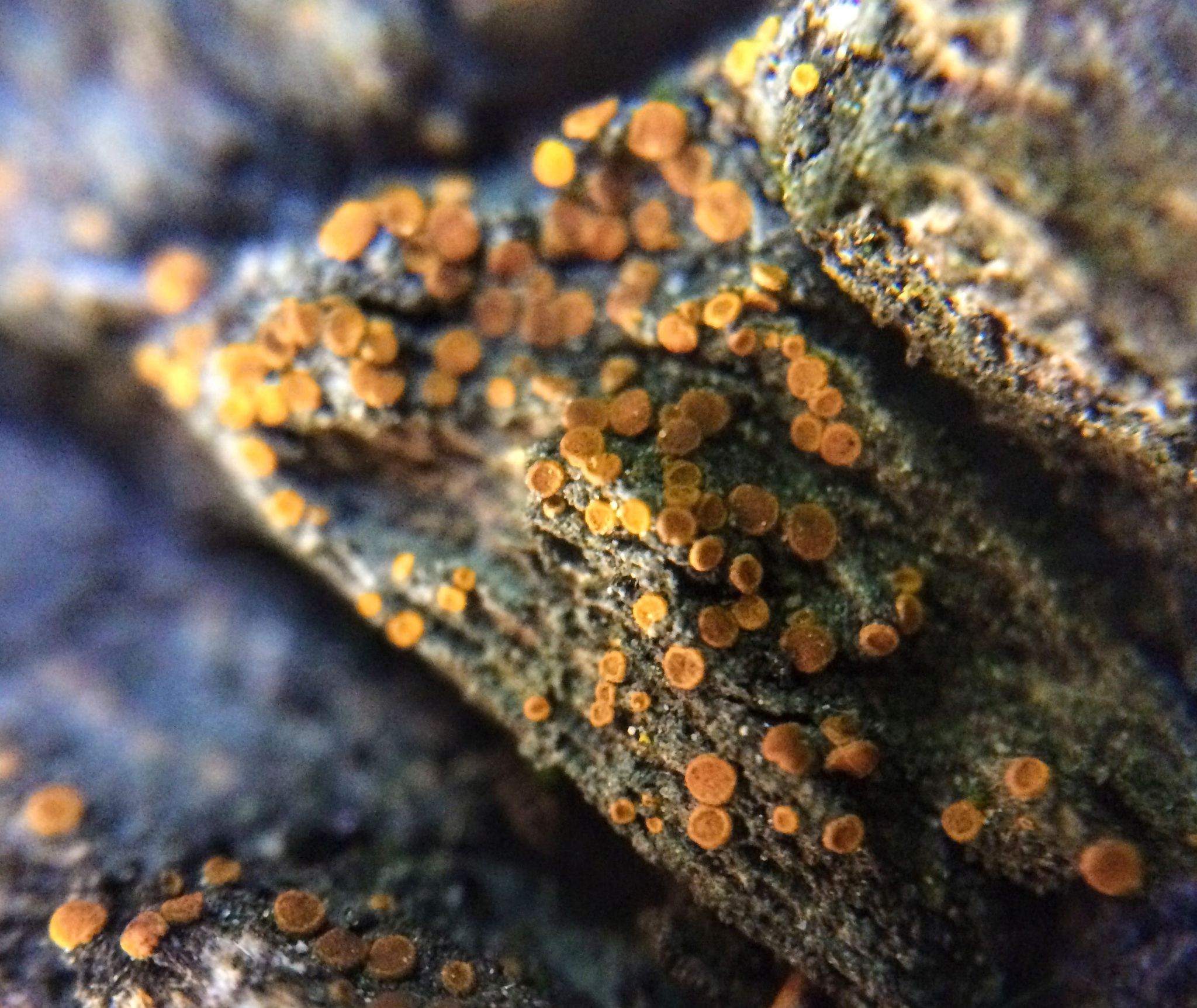

Conservation status
- Secure (NatureServe)

Scientific classification
- Domain: Eukaryota
- Kingdom: Fungi
- Division: Ascomycota
- Class: Lecanoromycetes
- Order: Teloschistales
- Family: Teloschistaceae
- Genus: Athallia
- Species: A. holocarpa

Binomial name
- Athallia holocarpa (Hoffm.) Arup, Frödén & Søchting

Synonyms
- Verrucaria obliterata var. holocarpa Hoffm. Caloplaca holocarpa (Hoffm.) A.E.Wade; Placodium pyraceum var. holocarpum (Hoffm.) Anzi

= Athallia holocarpa =

Species of fungus

Athallia holocarpa is a species of lichenised fungus in the Teloschistaceae family. It was first described as Verrucaria oblitterata var. holocarpa by Georg Franz Hoffman in 1796, and transferred to the new genus, Athallia, in 2013 by Ulf Arup, Ulrik Søchting, and Patrik Frödén.
