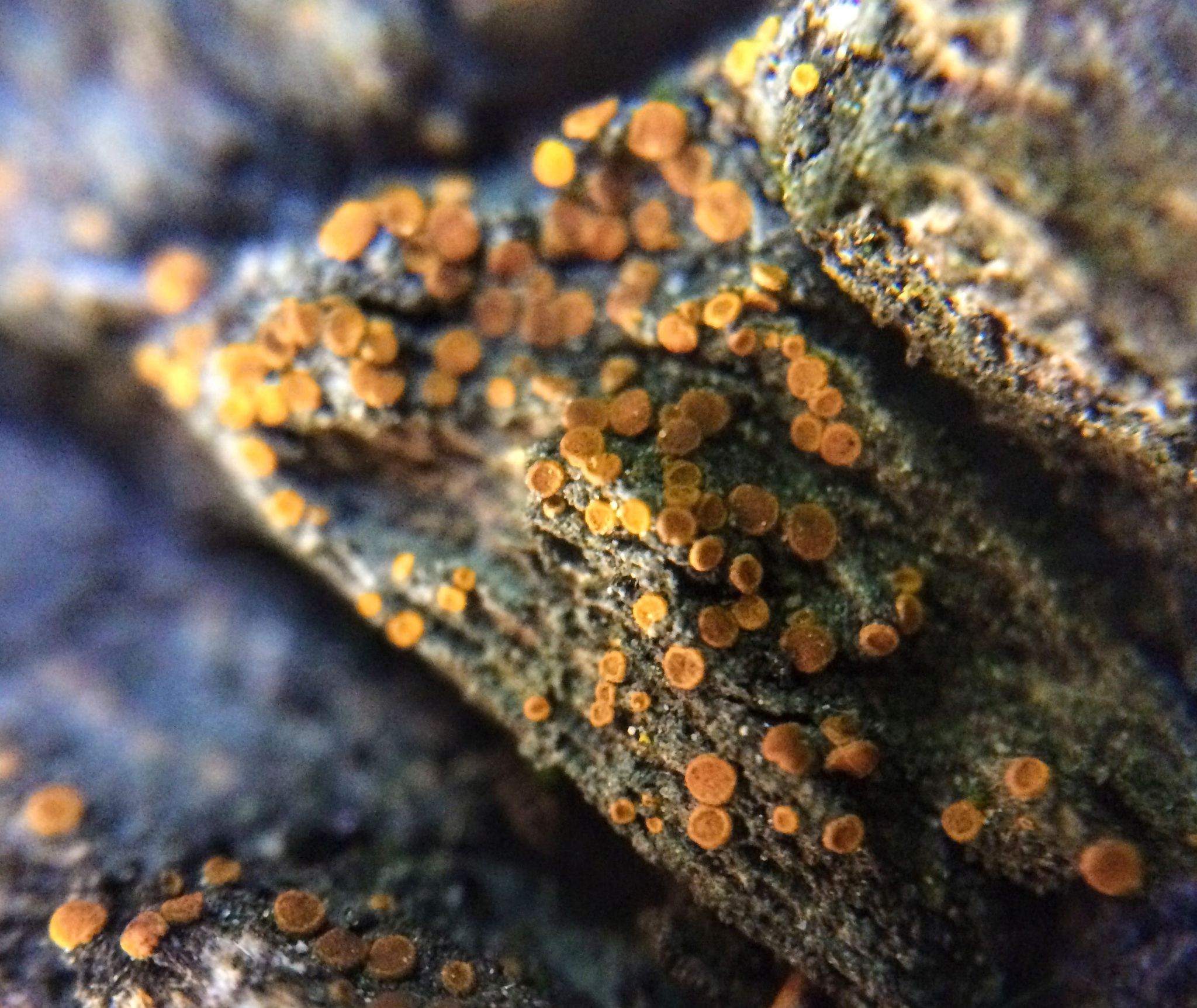
- Athallia holocarpa

Scientific classification
- Kingdom: Fungi
- Division: Ascomycota
- Class: Lecanoromycetes
- Order: Teloschistales
- Family: Teloschistaceae
- Genus: Athallia; Arup, Frödén & Søchting (2013)

Type species
- Athallia holocarpa (Hoffm.) Arup, Frödén & Søchting (2013)

= Athallia =

Genus of lichen-forming fungi

Athallia is a genus of lichen-forming fungi in the family Teloschistaceae. Most species have a poorly developed or almost invisible thallus, with the fruiting bodies often appearing to sit directly on the substrate. The genus occurs on bark, wood, and rock, and is found mainly in temperate regions of the Northern Hemisphere. All species share a characteristic set of orange anthraquinone pigments known as chemosyndrome A.

== Taxonomy ==
Athallia was described by Ulf Arup, Patrik Frödén and Ulrik Søchting in 2013 during a broader reworking of the family Teloschistaceae. That study set out to replace the traditional, very broad Caloplaca concept with smaller genera that better match evolutionary relationships inferred from DNA data. The authors placed Athallia in the subfamily Xanthorioideae and designated A. holocarpa as the type species. The genus name means "without thallus", referring to the reduced thallus that is common in the group.

In the phylogenetic analyses used to define the genus, Athallia formed a well-supported clade corresponding to the former "Caloplaca holocarpa group". Its nearest relatives were inferred to include Flavoplaca and Calogaya. The authors pointed out that Athallia and Flavoplaca are often hard to separate confidently by appearance alone, and that DNA evidence may be needed for secure placement; they also argued that Athallia cannot simply be merged into Flavoplaca without creating a much broader genus that would have to absorb several additional lineages. As part of establishing the genus, they made new combinations for several species previously placed in Caloplaca and other genera, including the transfer of Caloplaca cerinelloides to Athallia as A. cerinelloides.

== Description ==
Most species in Athallia have a poorly developed thallus, with the exception of A. scopularis. In A. scopularis, the thallus is well-developed and lobate, meaning it has a lobed structure. The cortex, which is the outer layer of the thallus, is typically an amorphous layer or made up of indistinctly organized tissue (indistinctly paraplectenchymatous), a tissue structure previously referred to as "alveolate" by Vondrák et al. in 2009. In A. scopularis, however, the cortex consists of hyphae (fungal filaments) that are arranged anticlinally, meaning they run perpendicular to the surface.

Athallia vitellinula is atypical in the genus for having a conspicuous thallus, but it is usually very thin. The apothecia (fruiting bodies) in Athallia are mainly zeorine, which means they lack a thalline margin. The spores produced are polaridiblastic, meaning they are divided into two components (locules) separated by a central septum with a perforation. Pycnidia, which are small, flask-shaped structures producing asexual spores (conidia), are typically orange in Athallia, but they are often absent. The conidia, when present, are ellipsoid in shape.

All Athallia lichens have a suite of secondary metabolites (lichen products) corresponding to the chemosyndrome A as previously elaborated by Søchting.

== Species ==
As of January 2026, Species Fungorum (in the Catalogue of Life) accepts 11 species of Athallia.

- Athallia alnetorum (Giralt, Nimis & Poelt) Arup, Frödén & Søchting (2013)
- Athallia brachyspora (Mereschk.) Halıcı & Vondrák (2016)
- Athallia cerinella (Nyl.) Arup, Frödén & Søchting (2013)
- Athallia cerinelloides (Erichsen) Arup, Frödén & Søchting (2013)
- Athallia holocarpa (Hoffm.) Arup, Frödén & Søchting (2013)
- Athallia inconnexa (Nyl.) S.Y.Kondr. & L.Lokos (2018)
- Athallia pyracea (Ach.) Arup, Frödén & Søchting (2013)
- Athallia saxifragarum (Poelt) Arup, Frödén & Søchting (2013)
- Athallia scopularis (Nyl.) Arup, Frödén & Søchting (2013)
- Athallia subrotundispora Stepanchikova, Himelbrant & I.V.Frolov (2025) – Russian Far East
- Athallia vitellinula (Nyl.) Arup, Frödén & Søchting (2013)

Two names assigned to this genus, Athallia necator (Poelt & Clauzade) Vondrák, Halıcı, Güllü & Demirel (2016), and Athallia nesodes (Poelt & Nimis) Halıcı & Vondrák (2016), were not validly published. A third name, Athallia baltistanica Poelt & Hinter. ex Halıcı & Vondrák (2016), is also treated as not validly published, because it was proposed as a new combination based on an invalid basionym (Caloplaca baltistanica Poelt & Hinter. 1993).

== Gallery ==
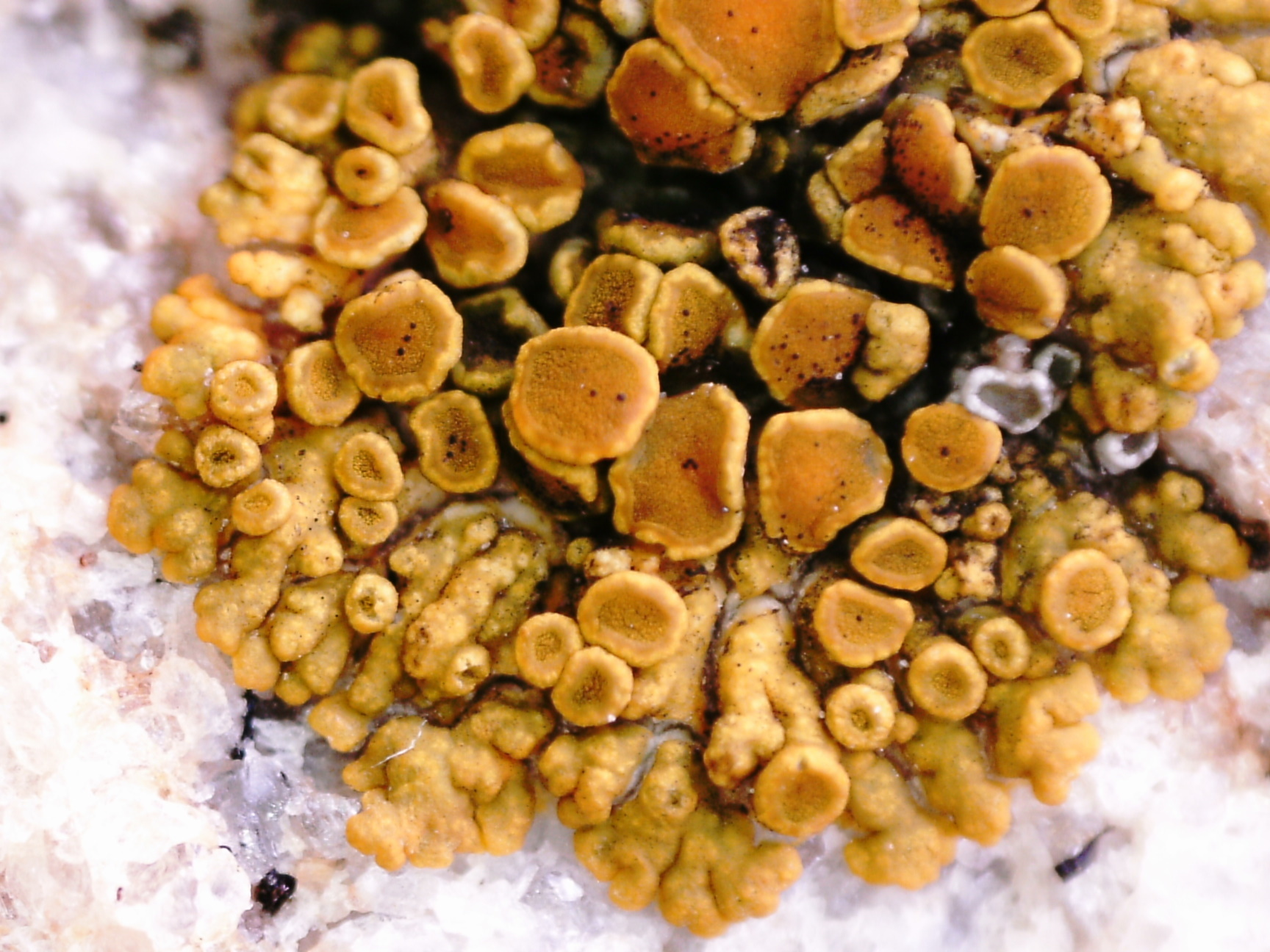
A. scopularis

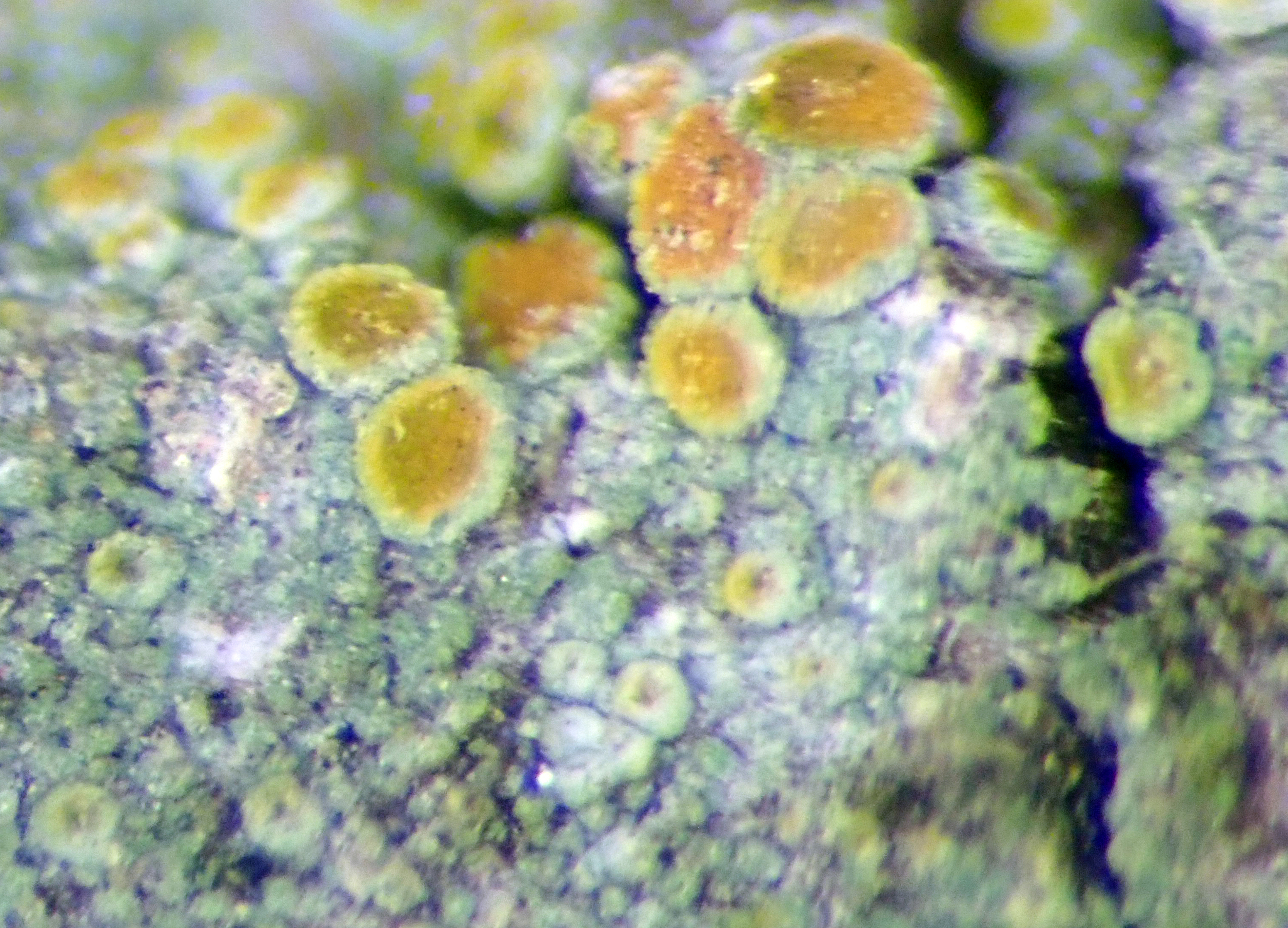
A. cerinelloides

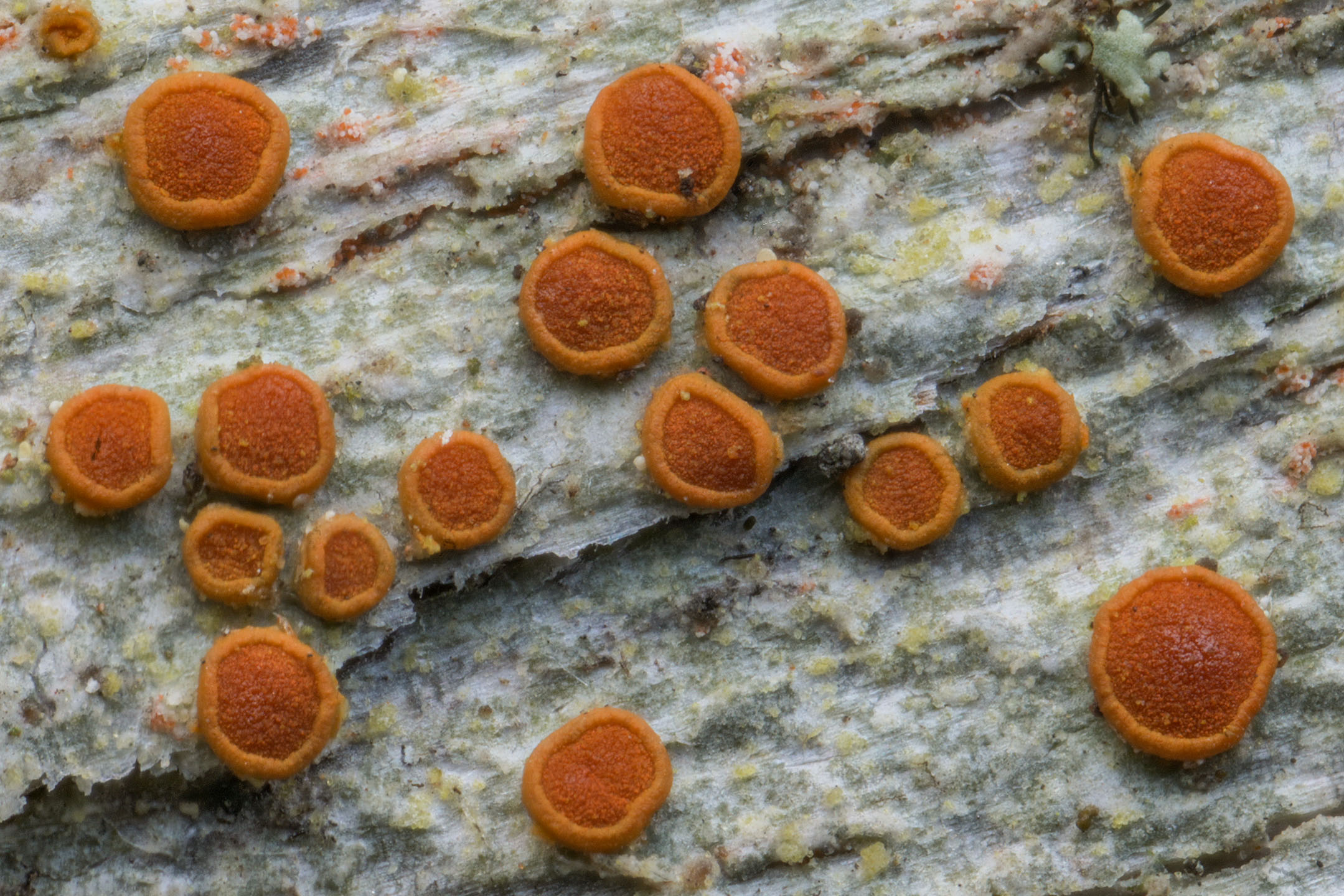
A. holocarpa
