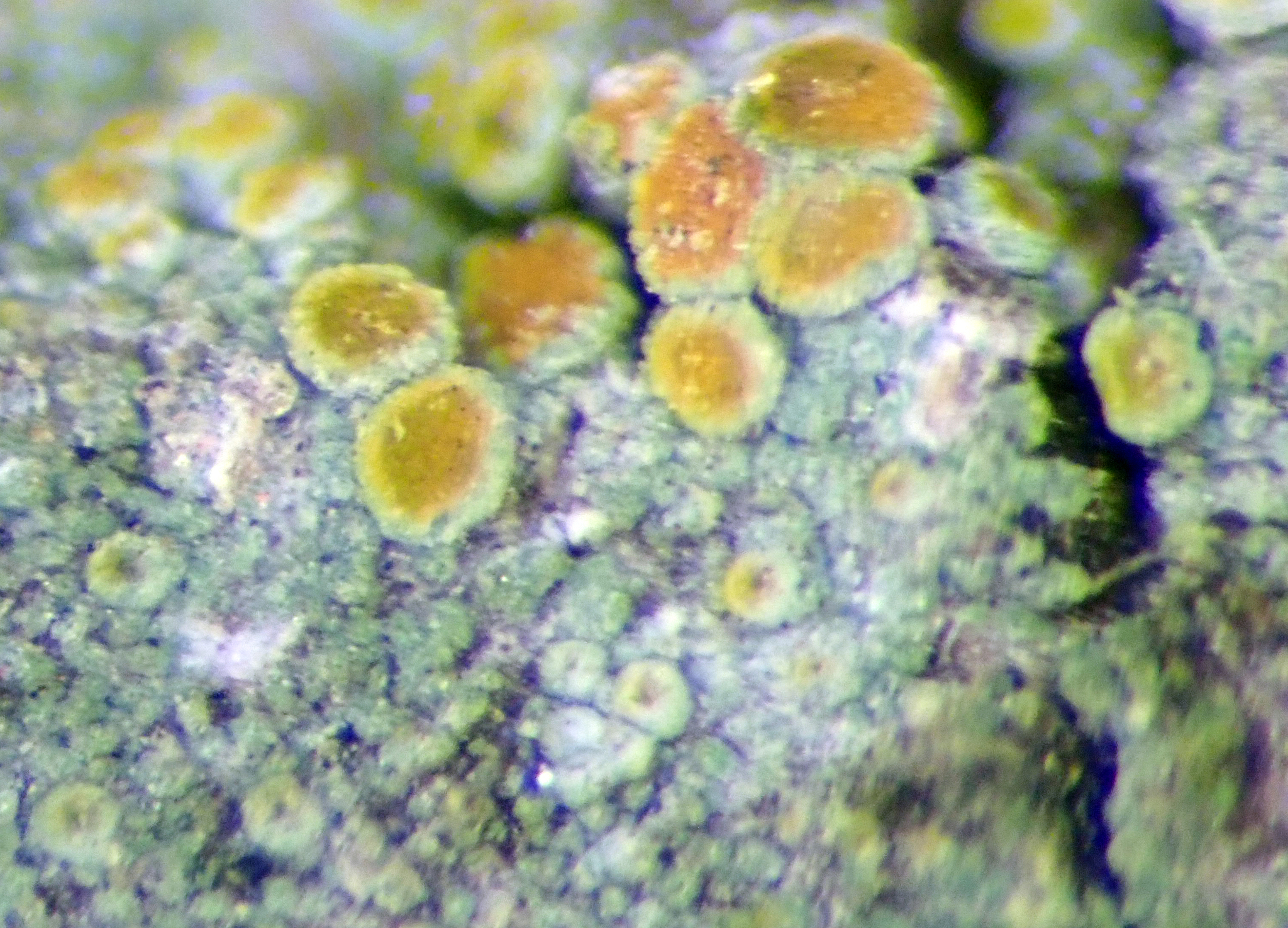

Scientific classification
- Kingdom: Fungi
- Division: Ascomycota
- Class: Lecanoromycetes
- Order: Teloschistales
- Family: Teloschistaceae
- Genus: Athallia
- Species: A. cerinelloides

Binomial name
- Athallia cerinelloides (Erichsen) Arup, Frödén & Søchting (2013)

Synonyms
- Caloplaca pyracea var. cerinelloides Erichsen (1930); Caloplaca pyracea f. cerinelloides (Erichsen) Zahlbr. (1931); Caloplaca cerinelloides (Erichsen) Poelt (1993)

= Athallia cerinelloides =

Species of lichen-forming fungus

Athallia cerinelloides is a species of lichen-forming fungus in the family Teloschistaceae. It grows on bark and produces tiny yellow to orange apothecia (disc-like fruiting bodies), while the thallus is often so reduced that it can be hard to see. The species was long treated in the genus Caloplaca as Caloplaca cerinelloides.

== Taxonomy ==
The species was originally described by the German lichenologist Christian Erichsen in 1930 as Caloplaca pyracea var. cerinelloides. Josef Poelt promoted it to full species status in 1993, as Caloplaca cerinelloides. In 2013, Ulf Arup and colleagues reclassified it in Athallia. The type specimen was collected in 1924 by Erichsen on elder (Sambucus) between the villages of Tarp and Süder Schmedeby in Schleswig-Holstein, northern Germany; a lectotype was selected from this material by Arup in 2009 and is housed in the Hamburg herbarium (HBG). It belongs to a set of teloschistaceous lichens with a strongly reduced thallus and brightly pigmented apothecia; in this group the apothecial margin is typically zeorine (with both a purely fungal rim and an outer rim that includes algal cells), and the spores are polarilocular (two chambers separated by a thick septum).

== Description ==
The thallus is inconspicuous and may be partly endophloeodal (developing within the bark), sometimes appearing only as a very thin film close to the apothecia. The apothecia are small, usually about 0.2–0.4 mm across, with yellow to orange discs. Ascospores are ellipsoid and polarilocular, typically about 10–15 × 6–9 μm, with a relatively thick septum (roughly 4–6 μm); pycnidia have not been reported for this species in the material examined.

== Habitat and distribution ==
Athallia cerinelloides occurs on nitrophilous (nutrient-enriched) bark across Europe, and it is often found growing alongside the similar bark-dwelling species Caloplaca pyracea.
