= Honeggeria =

Scientific classification
- Kingdom: Fungi
- Division: Ascomycota
- Class: Lecanoromycetes
- Order: Teloschistales
- Family: Teloschistaceae
- Genus: Honeggeria; S.Y.Kondr., Fedorenko, S.Stenroos, Kärnefelt, Elix, Hur & A.Thell (2012)
- Species: H. rosmarieae

Binomial name
- Honeggeria rosmarieae (S.Y.Kondr. & Kärnefelt) S.Y.Kondr., Fedorenko, S.Stenroos, Kärnefelt, Elix, Hur & A.Thell (2012)

Synonyms
- Xanthomendoza rosmarieae S.Y.Kondr. & Kärnefelt (2011)

Single-species lichen genus

Honeggeria is a single-species fungal genus in the family Teloschistaceae. It contains the species Honeggeria rosmarieae, a corticolous (bark-dwelling), foliose lichen found in the United States. Characteristic features of the lichen include its isidia-like soredia, rhizines that are relatively broad and short, slender ascospores, and a rudimentary true exciple with a textura intricata tissue structure.

== Taxonomy ==
The genus was circumscribed in 2012 by the lichenologists Sergey Kondratyuk, Natalya Fedorenko, Soili Stenroos, Ingvar Kärnefelt, John Elix, Jae-Seoun Hur, and Arne Thell. Honeggeria was one of several genera proposed by these authors (the others were Gallowayella, Golubkovia, Oxneria, and Jesmurrayia) in order to solve the problem of the polyphyletic genus Xanthomendoza.

The single species of Honeggeria was first formally described a year earlier by Kondratyuk and Kärnefelt, who classified it in the genus Xanthomendoza. The type specimen was collected from Georgetown, Delaware, where it was found growing on aspen bark together with Parmelia sulcata. It is only known to occur at the type locality. Both the species epithet and the genus name honour the Swiss lichenologist Rosmarie Honegger.

In their 2013 molecular phylogenetics-based restructuring and revision of the Teloschistaceae, Ulf Arup and colleagues did not accept genus Honeggeria, claiming there was little phylogenetic support for its existence. They gave it as an example of a recently created Teloschistaceae genus that had "not been generally accepted", and instead treated Honeggeria as synonymous with Xanthomendoza.
