= Gallowayella galericulata =

Scientific classification
- Kingdom: Fungi
- Division: Ascomycota
- Class: Lecanoromycetes
- Order: Teloschistales
- Family: Teloschistaceae
- Genus: Gallowayella
- Species: G. galericulata

Binomial name
- Gallowayella galericulata (L.Lindblom) S.Y.Kondr., Fedorenko, S.Stenroos, Kärnefelt, Elix, Hur & A.Thell (2012)

Synonyms
- Xanthomendoza galericulata L.Lindblom (2006)

Species of lichen

Gallowayella galericulata is a species of corticolous and lignicolous (bark- and wood-dwelling) lichen in the family Teloschistaceae. This species has small, orange, foliose (leafy), loosely adnate thalli that form either compact colonies or spread extensively. The lobes of the thallus are typically curved inward, and often form a characteristic helmet- or hood-like shape. Found in dry regions of the western United States, it colonises bark and wood, particularly favouring dry twigs of various shrubs and trees.

== Taxonomy ==
The species was formally described as a new species in 2006 by the Swedish lichenologist Louise Lindblom. The type specimen was collected by Stephen and Sylvia Sharnoff in a sagebrush area south of Boise, Idaho, where it was found growing on Artemesia. It is named for its distinctive helmet-shaped lobes. Sergey Kondratyuk and colleagues transferred the taxon to the newly circumscribed genus Gallowayella in 2012.

== Description ==
The lichen has a corticolous (bark-dwelling) thallus, foliose in nature and forming small, somewhat erect cushions with a diameter of up to 3 mm. The lobes are typically incurved, often with a helmet-like shape due to the presence of apicolous (at the tip) soralia; young lobes are abundant and dissected, becoming truncated or rounded as they mature. Its upper surface is orange to dull orange, smooth to shiny, and very rarely shows a light dusting of pruina (a powdery coating). The lower surface varies from white to yellow, occasionally eroded by soralia. Soralia, containing yellow to greenish yellow soredia, form on the lower side of lobes, often under the mature lobes' helmet-shaped parts.

Apothecia (fruiting bodies) have not been observed to occur in this species. Pycnidia (asexual reproductive structures producing conidia) are very rare, either immersed or slightly protruding, with conidia that are bacilliform (rod-shaped), hyaline (translucent), measuring 3–5 by 1–1.5 μm.

=== Similar species ===
Gallowayella galericulata is distinguished from other species by its unique soralia placement under helmet-shaped lobe ends and a tendency for lobes to appear almost inflated. This species has thicker and more robust thalli compared to Gallowayella fulva, with lobes that vary more in width and do not branch dichotomously. G. galericulata shares similarities with Xanthomendoza oregana but differs in its darker orange thallus and exclusively bacilliform conidia.

== Chemistry ==
Chemical analysis reveals high concentrations of parietin and teloschistin, with smaller amounts of fallacinal, parietinic acid, and emodin. This suite of compounds correspond to chemosyndrome A3, indicating a specific secondary metabolite profile.

== Habitat and distribution ==
Gallowayella galericulata thrives on both wood and bark, frequently encountered on dry twigs of Artemisia spp., Pseudoacacia spp., Populus angustifolia, Quercus douglasii, and Sarcobatus species. Its habitat spans relatively dry areas of the western United States.

Gallowayella galericulata has a distinct preference for certain tree species, notably Populus angustifolia, driven by the genetically determined characteristics of the tree's bark. Research in a controlled garden environment (the Ogden Nature Center) suggests that the genotype of Populus angustifolia plays a crucial role in the lichen's distribution, with specific factors like bark texture, levels of condensed tannins, and overall tree size being significant. This sensitivity to genetic variations within Populus angustifolia indicates a degree of heritability and suggests that even if the trees do not exert direct selective pressure on lichen coverage, their traits may still indirectly shape the lichen's evolutionary path.

Studies conducted in Utah's forested ecosystems have examined the diversity and composition of lichen communities in relation to aspen cover, contrasting them across aspen, non-aspen hardwood, and coniferous environments. Xanthomendoza galericulata emerged as an indicator for aspen forests, demonstrating a strong positive correlation with aspen cover, yet showing versatility in colonizing various bark types.
