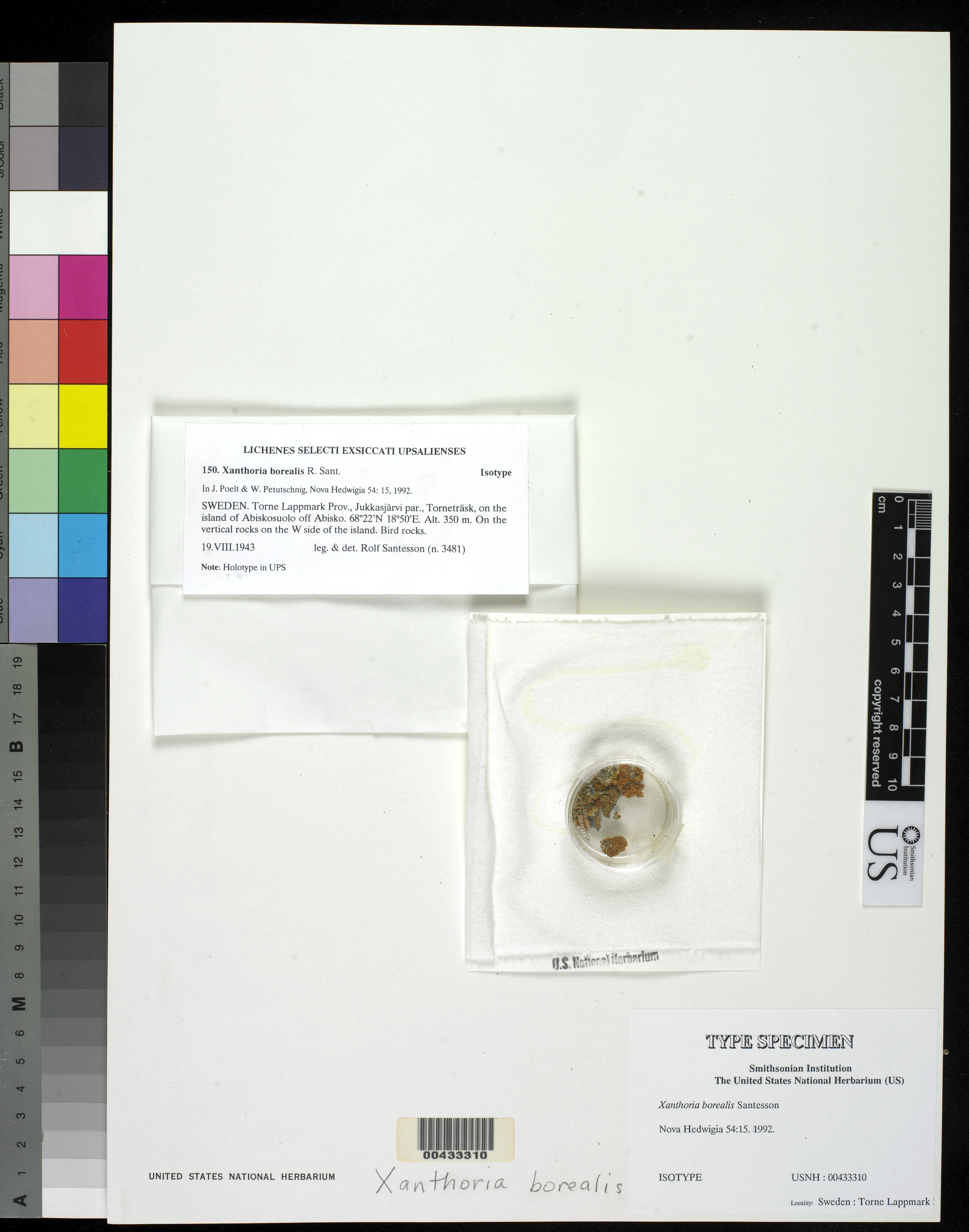
- Type specimen of Xanthoria borealis

Scientific classification
- Domain: Eukaryota
- Kingdom: Fungi
- Division: Ascomycota
- Class: Lecanoromycetes
- Order: Teloschistales
- Family: Teloschistaceae
- Genus: Gallowayella
- Species: G. borealis

Binomial name
- Gallowayella borealis (R.Sant. & Poelt) S.Y.Kondr., Fedorenko, S.Stenroos, Kärnefelt, Elix, Hur & A.Thell (2012)

Synonyms
- Xanthoria borealis R.Sant. & Poelt (1992); Xanthomendoza borealis (R.Sant. & Poelt) Søchting, Kärnefelt & S.Y.Kondr. (2002); Oxneria borealis (R.Sant. & Poelt) S.Y.Kondr. & Kärnefelt (2003)

= Gallowayella borealis =

Species of lichen

Gallowayella borealis is a species of saxicolous and muscicolous (rock- and moss-dwelling), lichen in the family Teloschistaceae. The lichen is characterized by a foliose (leafy) thallus that forms small, cushion-like clusters, with lobes that are often convex and have a distinctive orange colour with a reddish tint, occasionally covered in pruina. It reproduces vegetatively through abundant soralia producing rounded, granule-like soredia. Chemically, it contains high levels of parietin among other lichen products. Gallowayella borealis thrives on both horizontal and vertical rock surfaces, often enriched by guano, and is particularly abundant in continental Antarctica, co-existing with Polycauliona candelaria near penguin rookeries. It has a bipolar distribution, found in the Arctic and boreal forests of the Northern Hemisphere as well as in ice-free zones of continental Antarctica.

== Taxonomy ==
The lichen was formally described as a new species in 1992 by Rolf Santesson and Josef Poelt, who classified it in the genus Xanthoria. The type specimen was collected in 1943 by Santesson from the island of Abisko-suolo off Abisko, Sweden. The taxon was later proposed for transfer to the genera Xanthomendoza in 2002, and Oxneria in 2003.

== Description ==
Gallowayella borealis has a saxicolous (rock-dwelling) or muscicolous (moss-dwelling) foliose (leaf-like) thallus, typically clustering into small, cushion-like formations up to 1.5 cm in diameter. Its lobes, which can be flat but are more commonly strongly convex, measure up to 1 mm across. These lobes extend horizontally or more frequently rise upwards or stand erect, often securely attached to the substrate by a central holdfast. The margins of the lobes are intricately cut or scalloped, curving downwards to form narrow, finger-like extensions that often bear a more yellowish hue; the overall colour is orange with a reddish tint when subjected to bright light, occasionally displaying a light dusting of pruina (a powdery coating).

The presence of rhizines (root-like structures for attachment) is very sparse. Soralia, the structures that produce soredia for vegetative reproduction, are plentiful and feature blastidious soredia, a term indicating a budding form of reproduction. These soralia irregularly appear on the underside of the lobe tips, which may resemble lips, helmets, or cornets in shape. The soredia themselves are approximately 40 μm in diameter, varying in quantity from sparse and contained to abundant and freely dispersed.

Reproductive structures known as apothecia (fruiting bodies bearing spores) have not been observed in this species. Pycnidia, which are asexual reproductive structures producing conidia (spores), are exceedingly rare, either flush with the surface or slightly protruding, and match the upper lobe surface in colour. The conidia are bacilliform (rod-shaped), clear, and measure between 1.9 and 3.4 μm in length and 1 to 1.5 μm in width.

Chemically, all examined specimens of Gallowayella borealis are characterised by high concentrations of parietin alongside minor quantities of teloschistin, fallacinal, parietinic acid, and emodin, a suit of secondary metabolites aligning with what is referred to as chemosyndrome A. This specific chemical composition contributes to the lichen's distinctive appearance and reproductive mechanisms.

== Habitat and distribution ==
Gallowayella borealis is found growing on both horizontal and vertical rock surfaces, which are often enriched by substances like guano. In continental Antarctica, this species is abundant, thriving on moss cushions alongside Polycauliona candelaria in areas enriched by nutrients from penguin rookeries.

This lichen is recognised as a truly bipolar species, being widely distributed in the Arctic regions of the Northern Hemisphere and extending into the boreal forest zones. Its range spans southwards to central Scandinavia in Europe and to British Columbia in North America, although it is not very common in these locations. Previous records from Oregon, Colorado, and the Himalayas have been corrected to belong to Xanthomendoza mendozae.

In the Southern Hemisphere, Gallowayella borealis is abundant in ice-free areas of continental Antarctica but is absent from the maritime Antarctic regions. The species' presence in Antarctica is hypothesised to be a result of long-distance transport, possibly via birds or wind, suggesting a preference for continental climates. Its rarity in certain climates may also reflect the incidental nature of its dispersal to suitable microhabitats. The Andes in southern South America have yet to be thoroughly explored to confirm the absence of G. borealis there.
