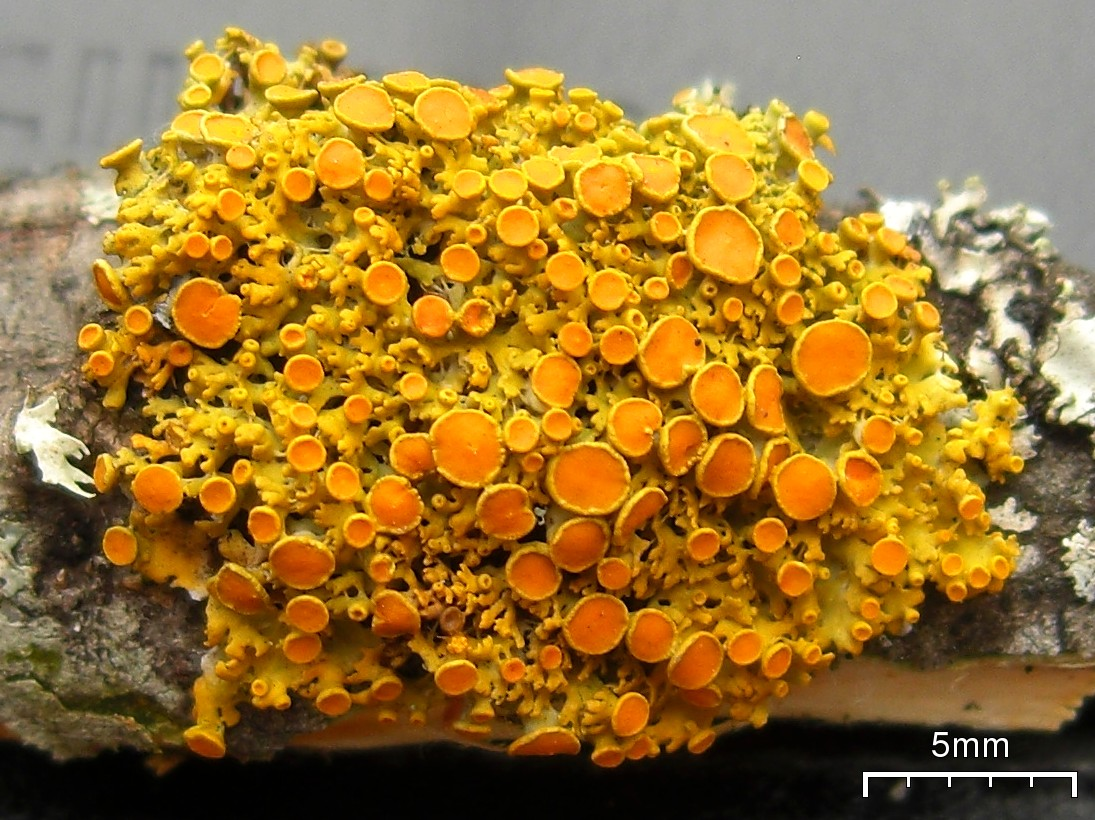

Scientific classification
- Domain: Eukaryota
- Kingdom: Fungi
- Division: Ascomycota
- Class: Lecanoromycetes
- Order: Teloschistales
- Family: Teloschistaceae
- Genus: Gallowayella
- Species: G. hasseana

Binomial name
- Gallowayella hasseana (Räsänen) S.Y.Kondr., Fedorenko, S.Stenroos, Kärnefelt, Elix, Hur & A.Thell (2012)

Synonyms
- Xanthoria hasseana Räsänen (1944); Xanthomendoza hasseana (Räsänen) Søchting, Kärnefelt & S.Y.Kondr. (2002); Oxneria hasseana (Räsänen) S.Y.Kondr. & Kärnefelt (2003)

= Gallowayella hasseana =

Species of lichen

Gallowayella hasseana, the poplar sunburst lichen, is a species of corticolous (bark-dwelling), crustose lichen in the family Teloschistaceae. It occurs in North America.

== Taxonomy ==
The lichen was first formally described as a new species in 1944 by Finnish lichenologist Veli Räsänen as Xanthoria hasseana. Over a half-century later, it was transferred to Xanthomendoza. Sergey Kondratyuk and Ingvar Kärnefelt proposed a transfer to genus Oxneria in 2003. In 2012, the genus Gallowayella was circumscribed, and this species transferred to it. The species is commonly known as the "poplar sunburst lichen".

== Description ==
The lichen has a yellowish-orange thallus comprising small, overlapping lobes (measuring 0.3–0.9 mm wide) arranged in a loosely attached rosette. The thallus undersurface is white, and attaches to the bark substrate by relatively long rhizines. There are neither isidia nor soredia on the thallus surface. Apothecia, usually numerous in the center of the thallus, have dark orange discs and are 0.6–3 mm in diameter. Ascospores are ellipsoid in shape with a single septum, and have typical dimensions of 15.5–18 by 7.5–9.5 μm.

Gallowayella hasseana mostly grows on bark (especially poplar bark), although it has occasionally been recorded on rock or on wood. It prefers open or partially shaded areas.
