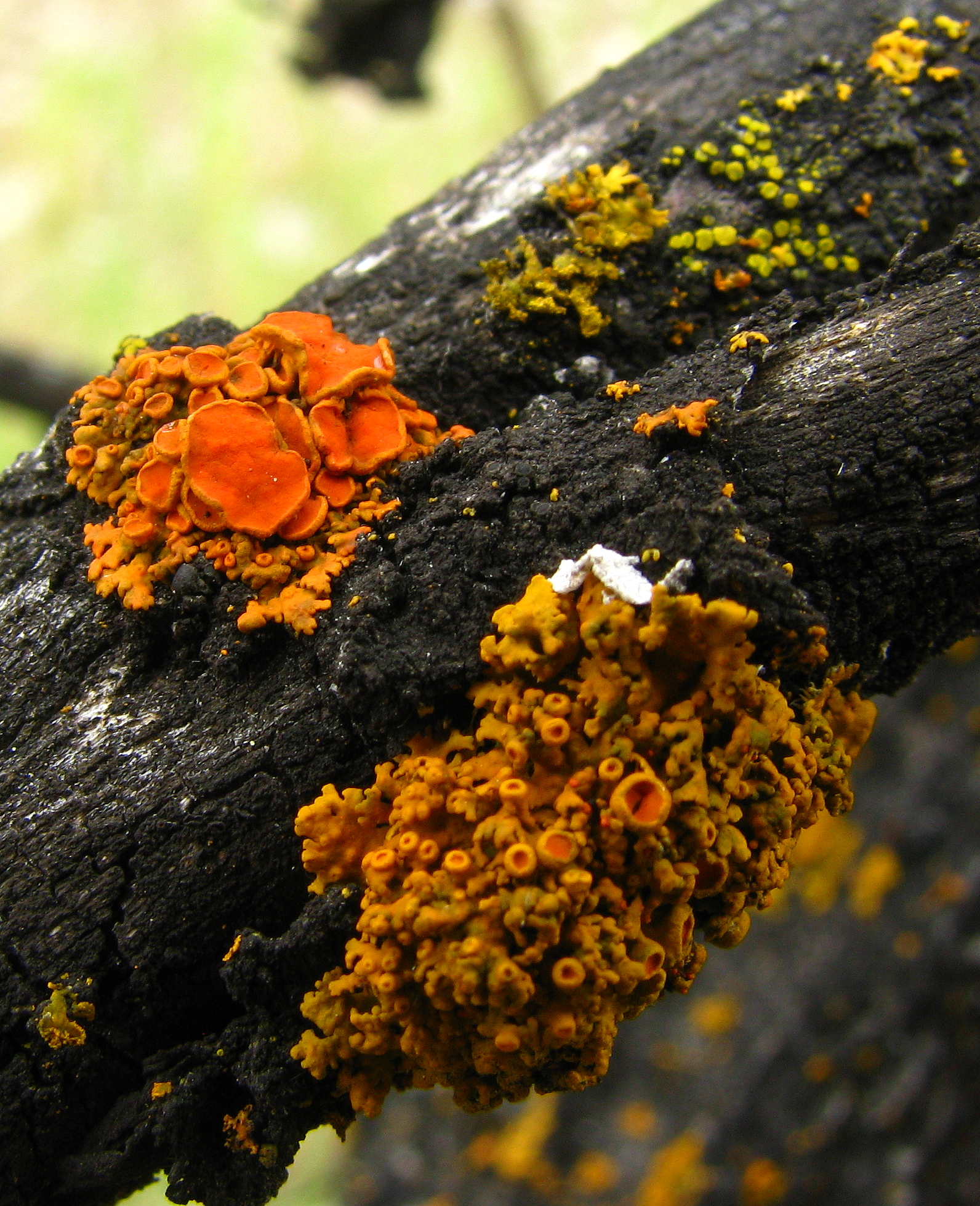

Scientific classification
- Domain: Eukaryota
- Kingdom: Fungi
- Division: Ascomycota
- Class: Lecanoromycetes
- Order: Teloschistales
- Family: Teloschistaceae
- Genus: Gallowayella
- Species: G. montana

Binomial name
- Gallowayella montana (L.Lindblom) S.Y.Kondr., Fedorenko, S.Stenroos, Kärnefelt, Elix, Hur & A.Thell (2012)

Synonyms
- Oxneria montana (L.Lindblom) S.Y.Kondr. & Kärnefelt (2003); Xanthomendoza montana (L.Lindblom) Søchting, Kärnefelt & S.Y.Kondr. (2002); Xanthoria montana L.Lindblom (1997)

= Gallowayella montana =

Species of lichen

Gallowayella montana is a species of corticolous (bark-dwelling) lichen in the family Teloschistaceae. It occurs in North America.

== Taxonomy ==
The lichen was first formally described as a new species in 1997 by Swedish/Norwegian lichenologist Louise Lindblom, as a member of genus Xanthoria. The type specimen was collected by William Weber in Montrose County, Colorado near the Cerro Summit, at an altitude of 7,600 ft (2,300 m). The species epithet derives from the Latin word montanus, or montane. After being transferred to genus Xanthomendoza in 2002, and then to Oxneria a year later, in 2012 Sergey Kondratyuk and colleagues transferred it to the genus Gallowayella as part of a molecular phylogenetics-based restructuring of several genera in subfamily Xanthioideae of family Teloschistaceae.

== Description ==
The thallus of Gallowayella montana forms rosettes up to 3 cm (1 3/16 in) in diameter, although neighbouring thalli often coalesce to form larger units. Its color ranges from yellow to light orange to dark orange, and the surface is shiny. The lobes comprising the thallus are between 0.2 and 0.5 mm wide, and more or less smooth, flat, and horizontal, with frequently branches and rounded tips. There are many rhizines on the underside of the thallus that attach it to the substrate; they are white to yellow in color. The photobiont layer is more or less discontinuous and occurs throughout the medulla. Apothecia are frequent in this species; they have a maximum diameter of 3.5 mm are flat to slightly concave. Ascospores produced by the lichen are clylindrical to narrowly ellipsoid in shape, have a single septum, and typically measure 13.0–15.6 long by 5.1–7.4 μm wide.

== Habitat and distribution ==
Gallowayella montana is widely distributed in temperate regions of the western United States and Canada; a single collection has been noted from Alaska, as well as a dubious collection from Washington, D.C. It grows on the bark of trees, particularly species of poplar, oak, and Artemisia. The lichen tends to occur in dry, open habitats that are nutrient rich.
