= Nevilleiella marchantii =

Scientific classification
- Kingdom: Fungi
- Division: Ascomycota
- Class: Lecanoromycetes
- Order: Teloschistales
- Family: Teloschistaceae
- Genus: Nevilleiella
- Species: N. marchantii

Binomial name
- Nevilleiella marchantii (S.Y.Kondr. & Kärnefelt) S.Y.Kondr. & Hur (2017)
- Holotype: Lake King, Western Australia

Synonyms
- Caloplaca marchantii S.Y.Kondr. & Kärnefelt (2007)

Species of lichen

Nevilleiella marchantii is a species of terricolous (ground-dwelling), crustose lichen in the family Teloschistaceae. Found in Australia, it was formally described as a new species in 2007. The thallus of Nevilleiella marchantii spreads 1–3 cm wide, with distinctive, almost spherical, pustule-like formations that give it an appearance resembling a bunch of grapes. These formations vary in shape and colour from yellow-brown to orange-brown.

== Taxonomy ==
Sergey Kondratyuk and Ingvar Kärnefelt formally described this lichen as a new species in 2007; they initially classified it in the genus Caloplaca. The type specimen was gathered in January 2004, approximately 5 km away from the town of Lake King, situated on the eastern fringe of a lake with the same name in Western Australia. It was found growing in a chenopod heath habitat, situated on clay and sandy soil. The species epithet honours Western Australian botanist Neville Graeme Marchant, who assisted the authors during their field research. In 2017, Kondratyuk and Jae-Seoun Hur transferred the taxon to the newly circumscribed genus Nevilleiella, in which it is the type species.

== Description ==
Nevilleiella marchantii typically forms a thallus that spreads 1–3 cm wide. Characteristic is the presence of almost spherical, pustule-like formations, each measuring approximately 0.1–0.35 mm in diameter and rising to about 0.25 mm in height. These formations can appear as individual areoles or cluster together in squamule (scale)-like groups, creating a 'bunch of grapes' appearance. The areoles themselves are highly varied in form, ranging from convex and warty to spherical, and are coloured yellow-brown to orange-brown, occasionally with a whitish pruina.

The cortex of these areoles is typically up to 15 μm thick, composed of palisade paraplectenchymatous cells. Below this, there is often a necrotic layer (made of dead cells) around 5 μm thick. Apothecia (fruiting bodies), which are relatively rare in this species, measure 0.4–0.7 mm in diameter. They initially emerge immersed within single areoles and later develop a thalline margin and a concave disc, which becomes flatter as the apothecia mature. The cortex of the thalline exciple is made up of palisade paraplectenchymatous cells, measuring 7–12 by 2–5 μm in size. The true exciple, in contrast, is thicker at the uppermost lateral portion and thinner towards the base.

The hymenium (the fertile, spore-bearing layer) of Nevilleiella marchantii can reach heights of 60–75 μm and is often characterised by golden-coloured asci and ascospores. Its paraphyses are richly branched, with the uppermost cells slightly swollen. The subhymenium, containing visible oil droplets, supports the structure. The ascospores have a thickening near the septum, which is more visible under certain staining conditions. The conidiomata of this lichen are found in thalline warts with darkish reddish-orange tips.

Chemically, the thallus and apothecia of Nevilleiella marchantii are K+ (red), while its epicortex reacts K+ (violet). This species contains parietin as its major secondary metabolite (lichen product), along with other compounds such as fallacinal, parietinic acid, and teloschistin in varying concentrations.

== Habitat and distribution ==
Nevilleiella marchantii is primarily found forming crusts on clay soil within salt-affected areas. This species typically grows in open spaces or in mallee regions. It frequently coexists with a variety of other crustose lichens, and in some cases, even fragments of other lichens, such as Xanthoparmelia species and brown Cladia, can be found intermingled with its thallus. Nevilleiella marchantii has been recorded from various dispersed locations across Western Australia, New South Wales, and Victoria.
