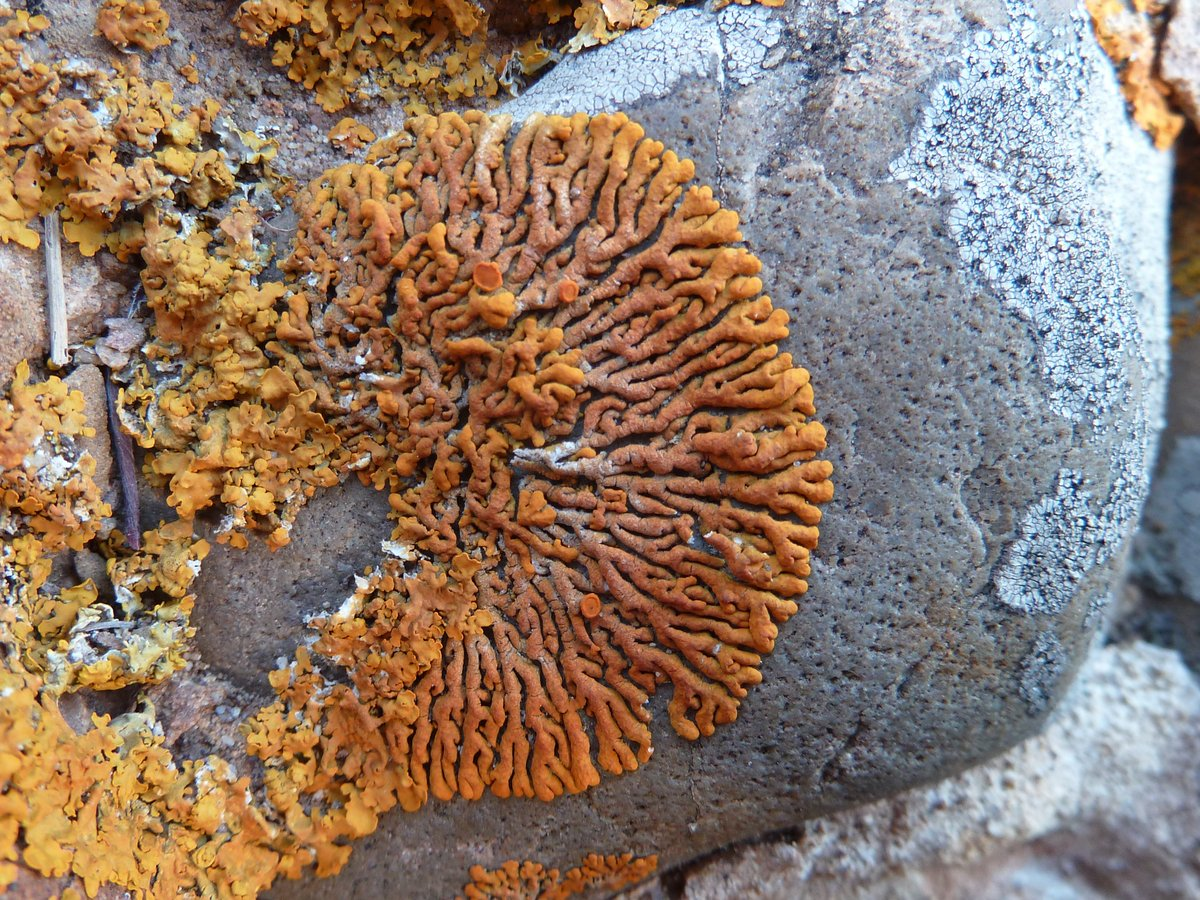

Scientific classification
- Kingdom: Fungi
- Division: Ascomycota
- Class: Lecanoromycetes
- Order: Teloschistales
- Family: Teloschistaceae
- Genus: Martinjahnsia; S.Y.Kondr., Fedorenko, S.Stenroos, Kärnefelt, Elix, Hur & A.Thell (2012)
- Species: M. resendei

Binomial name
- Martinjahnsia resendei (Poelt & Tav.) S.Y.Kondr., Fedorenko, S.Stenroos, Kärnefelt, Elix, Hur & A.Thell (2012)

Synonyms
- Rusavskia resendei (Poelt & Tav.) S.Y.Kondr. & Kärnefelt (2003); Xanthoria resendei Poelt & Tav. (1968)

= Martinjahnsia =

Species of lichen

Martinjahnsia is a single-species fungal genus in the family Teloschistaceae. It contains the sole species Martinjahnsia resendei, a saxicolous (rock-dwelling) crustose lichen.

== Taxonomy ==
This species was first scientifically described in 1968 by Josef Poelt and Carlos das Neves Tavares, who initially classified it in the genus Xanthoria. In 2003, Sergey Kondratyuk and Ingvar Kärnefelt proposed to transfer the species to the genus Rusavskia. Kondratyuk and colleagues suggested in 2012 that it be placed in a new genus, Martinjahnsia, to accommodate its unique phylogenetic position. The genus name honours German lichenologist Martin Jahns.

== Habitat and distribution ==
Martinjahnsia resendei has a Mediterranean distribution. The lichen is abundant in the southeast of Spain, where it colonises sunny rock surfaces, especially those enriched in nitrates. In islands of the Tuscan Archipelago, it is typically found on sun-exposed siliceous rocks on the Mediterranean coast.

== Chemistry ==
There are several lichen products that have been isolated and chemically characterised from Martinjahnsia resendei. These include peroxyergosterol, the anthraquinone pigments physcion, fallacinal, and fallacinol, and three new unidentified hopene-type triterpenes.
