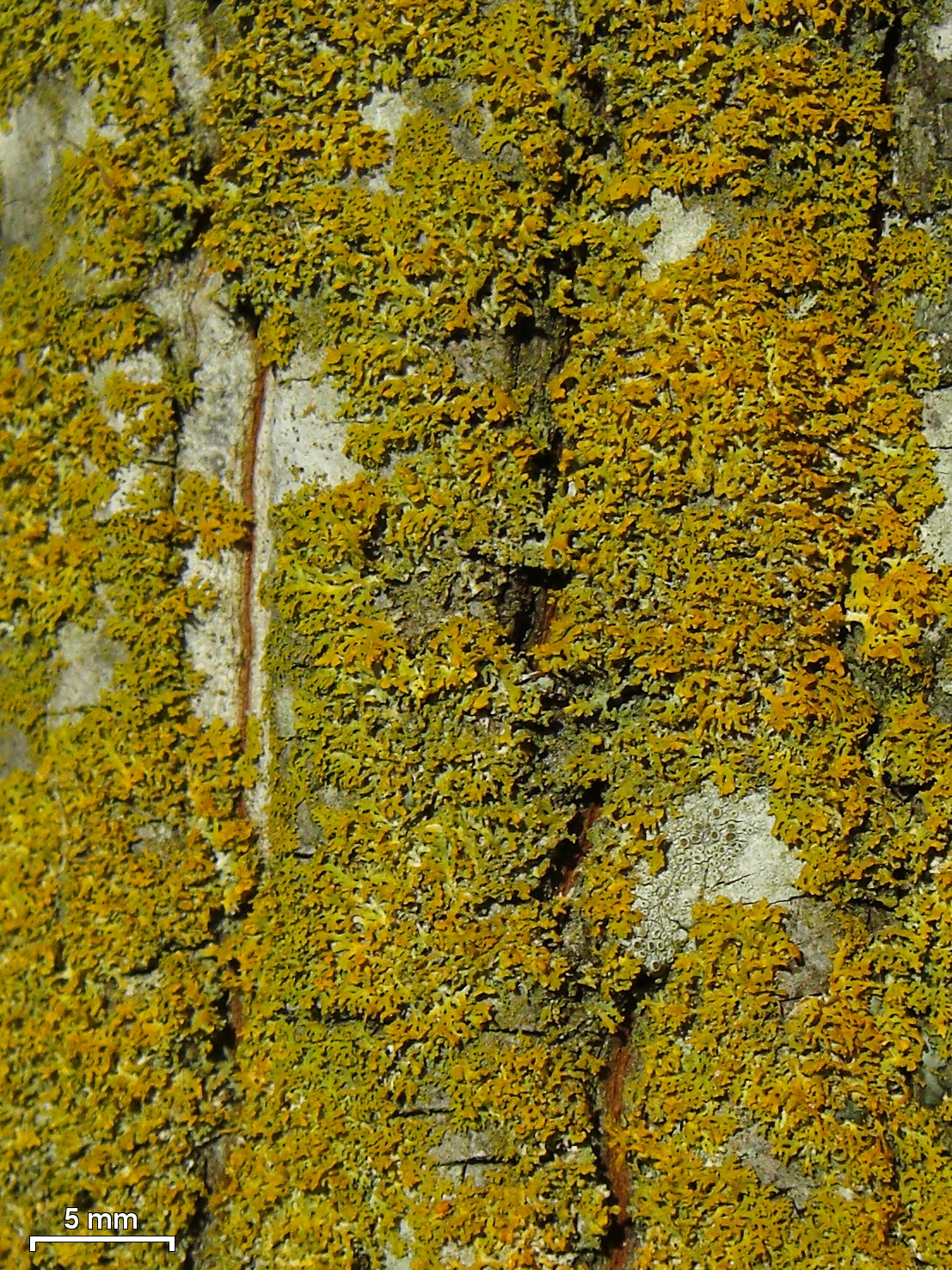
- in Delmarva, on the East Coast of the United States

Scientific classification
- Kingdom: Fungi
- Division: Ascomycota
- Class: Lecanoromycetes
- Order: Teloschistales
- Family: Teloschistaceae
- Genus: Gallowayella
- Species: G. weberi

Binomial name
- Gallowayella weberi (S.Y.Kondr. & Kärnefelt) S.Y.Kondr., Fedorenko, S.Stenroos, Kärnefelt, Elix, Hur & A.Thell (2012)

Synonyms
- Xanthoria weberi S.Y.Kondr. & Kärnefelt (2003); Oxneria weberi (S.Y.Kondr. & Kärnefelt) S.Y.Kondr. & Kärnefelt (2003); Xanthomendoza weberi (S.Y.Kondr. & Kärnefelt) L.Lindblom (2006)

= Gallowayella weberi =

Species of lichen-forming fungus

Gallowayella weberi is a species of corticolous and saxicolous (bark- and rock-dwelling), foliose lichen in the family Teloschistaceae. Recorded from the eastern and central United States, it is a small lichen with a smooth yellow to orange upper surface and a contrasting white lower surface. It was previously placed in the genus Xanthomendoza and appears in older literature as Xanthomendoza weberi. Herbarium records indicate that it is widespread across the eastern and central United States, with its centre of distribution in the coastal plain of the Southeast, where it grows on bark, rock, and even concrete and other man-made surfaces.

== Taxonomy ==
The lichen was first formally described as a new species in 2003 by the lichenologists Sergey Kondratyuk and Ingvar Kärnefelt, who named it Xanthoria weberii. The type specimen was collected in Grimes County, Texas in 1970. It was found by William Alfred Weber in woodlands dominated by Quercus stellata (Post Oak), where it was abundant on oak trees in both dusty roadside locations and urban areas. The spelling with two "i"s was erroneous, and it was corrected to weberi in a subsequent publication. After a couple more proposed generic transfers, to Oxneria and later to Xanthomendoza, a 2011 revision of eastern North American material concluded that two later-named taxa (Xanthomendoza rosmarieae from Delaware and Xanthoria wetmorei from Iowa) do not have reliable distinguishing features and are synonyms of X. weberi; the authors also noted that available DNA sequence evidence did not support treating them as separate species. The same study concluded that Xanthomendoza gallowayi is a different species, supporting continued use of the epithet weberi for this taxon. Kondratyuk, Kärnefelt, and their colleagues finally reclassified the taxon in the then newly circumscribed genus Gallowayella in 2012.

== Description ==
Gallowayella weberi is a foliose lichen that forms small thalli up to 4 mm wide, which adhere to surfaces ranging from closely to somewhat loosely attached. The lobes of the thallus are flat, ranging from horizontal to slightly ascending, and measure between 0.3 and 0.5 mm in width. The tips of these lobes often curve inward, and the outermost parts of mature lobes are truncated or cut off squarely.

The upper surface of Gallowayella weberi has a yellow to orange color and is smooth to the touch. Its lower surface contrasts with a white color. The cortex, or the outer layer of the lichen, is made of tightly packed cells and is colorless, except for the presence of external anthraquinone crystals, which are chemical compounds often found in lichens. The photobiont (photosynthetic partner) is a unicellular green alga from the genus Trebouxia.

The medulla, which is the inner tissue beneath the cortex, has a net-like structure made of short cells. Rhizines, which are root-like structures helping the lichen to anchor to its substrate, are mostly present and are white in color, turning yellow when exposed. They can be either attached to the substrate or free. Soralia, the structures for asexual reproduction, are found at the lobe tips and often form small structures resembling bird nests, with the soredia (powdery reproductive propagules) being yellow in color.

Apothecia (fruiting bodies) are rare in this species and range from 0.7 to 2.0 mm in width. The ascospores measure between 12.7 and 14.0 by 7.0 to 7.7 μm, with a septum thickness of 2.9 to 4.6 μm. Pycnidia, an asexual reproductive structure, are common on the surface (laminal) and are orange in color, measuring about 0.1 to 0.2 mm in diameter. The conidia (asexual spores) are rod-shaped and measure 3.2 to 3.6 μm in length.

Chemically, the cortex and apothecia react to a solution of potassium hydroxide by turning purple, but show no reaction to other chemical spot tests (C−, PD−, and I−). The medulla also shows no reaction to these tests. The major secondary metabolites (lichen products) found in Gallowayella weberi are parietin, fallacinal, and teloschistin, with emodin and parietinic acid as minor components. This distribution of secondary metabolites corresponds to the chemosyndroma A proposed by Ulrik Søchting in 1997.

== Habitat and distribution ==
Gallowayella weberi can grow on diverse substrates including bark and rock, as well as on artificial ones such as concrete and tombstones. It is native to North America, and herbarium-based mapping indicates that it is widespread across the eastern and central United States, with its centre of distribution in the coastal plain of the southeastern United States. At the Delaware locality originally used to describe Xanthomendoza rosmarieae, the lichen was abundant on roadside plantings of Norway maple (Acer platanoides).

== Species interactions ==
Tremella xanthomendozae is a lichenicolous fungus that infects Gallowayella weberi (it was named when its host was classified in genus Xanthomendoza).
