= Gallowayella aphrodites =

Scientific classification
- Domain: Eukaryota
- Kingdom: Fungi
- Division: Ascomycota
- Class: Lecanoromycetes
- Order: Teloschistales
- Family: Teloschistaceae
- Genus: Gallowayella
- Species: G. aphrodites

Binomial name
- Gallowayella aphrodites (Kalb, Poelt & S.Y.Kondr.) S.Y.Kondr., Fedorenko, S.Stenroos, Kärnefelt, Elix, Hur & A.Thell (2012)

Synonyms
- Xanthoria aphrodites Kalb, Poelt & S.Y.Kondr. (1997); Xanthomendoza aphrodites (Kalb, Poelt & S.Y.Kondr.) Søchting, Kärnefelt & S.Y.Kondr. (2002); Oxneria aphrodites (Kalb, Poelt & S.Y.Kondr.) S.Y.Kondr. & Kärnefelt (2003)

Species of lichen

Gallowayella aphrodites is a species of corticolous (bark-dwelling), foliose (leafy) lichen in the family Teloschistaceae. It is found in the Mediterranean countries Greece, Cyprus, and Italy. Characteristics of the lichen include its small thallus, the disposition of the rhizines on the thallus undersurface, and the lack of vegetative propagules.

== Taxonomy ==
The lichen was first formally described as new to science in 1997 by lichenologists Klaus Kalb, Josef Poelt, and Sergey Kondratyuk. The type specimen was collected by Kalb from Cyprus, about 5 km (5,000 m) northwest of the Kykkos Monastery. There, at an elevation of 1,000 m (3,300 ft), it was found growing on tree bark. The species epithet aphrodites names Ancient Greek goddess Aphrodite, "who is said to have emerged from the sea off the coast of Cyprus".

In 2002, Søchting, Ingvar Kärnefelt, and Kondratyuk proposed transferring the taxon to genus Xanthomendoza as one of 16 members of the X. ulophyllodes species complex, based on preliminary molecular phylogenetic analysis of this group. A year later, Kondratyuk and Kärnefelt moved to it genus Oxneria, and finally to Gallowayella in 2012.

== Description ==
The foliose, yellow to orange-yellow thallus of Gallowayella aphrodites is between 1–1.8 cm (0.4–0.7 in) in diameter. It comprises flat lobes measuring 2–7 mm long and 1–1.5 mm wide that branch at the end to form even smaller lobes. The thallus undersurface is whitish and has whitish rhizines (about 0.3–0.7 mm long and 0.05–0.13 mm thick) that help attach the thallus to the bark; these rhizines are mostly under the margins and rarely project out. There are neither isidia nor soredia. The apothecia are 0.6–3.0 mm in diameter with a constriction at the base, and have a flat to somewhat concave disc that is slightly darker in colour than the apothecial margins. Asci are club-shaped (clavate), contain eight spores, and measure 65–75 by 12–19 μm. Ascospores are more or less ellipsoid with a single septum, and have dimensions of 13–17 by 7–11 μm. Spermogonia are visible on the thallus surface as solitary reddish-orange warts; they contain bacilliform (rod-shaped) spermatia that are 3.5–4.8 by 0.9–1.0 μm.

Xanthoria parietina is a lookalike species that often co-occurs with Gallowayella aphrodites.

== Habitat and distribution ==
Gallowayella aphrodites has a Mediterranean distribution. In Italy, it occurs in Basilicata and Calabria. In Greece, it has been found on the island of Crete, and from Ipiros on the mainland. Two of the Greek collections were noted to be growing parasitically on Physconia perisidiosa, and Physconia venusta.

Plants that are known to harbour Gallowayella aphrodites include Castanea sativa and Quercus pubescens. Several lichens were noted as closely associated species from the type collection in Cyprus, including X. parietina, X. candelaria, Phaeophyscia orbicularis, Lecanora chlarotera, Physconia distorta, P. enteroxantha, Physcia semipinnata, P. aipolia, Caloplaca cerina, Lecidella euphorea, and various species from the genera Candelariella, Orthotrichum, and Rinodina.
