= Nevilleiella =

Scientific classification
- Domain: Eukaryota
- Kingdom: Fungi
- Division: Ascomycota
- Class: Lecanoromycetes
- Order: Teloschistales
- Family: Teloschistaceae
- Genus: Nevilleiella; S.Y.Kondr. & Hur (2017)

Type species
- Nevilleiella marchantii (S.Y.Kondr. & Kärnefelt) S.Y.Kondr. & Hur (2017)

Species
- N. lateritia N. marchantii

Genus of lichens

Nevilleiella is a genus of lichen-forming fungi in the subfamily Teloschistoideae of the family Teloschistaceae. It has two species of crustose lichens that are found in Australia.

== Taxonomy ==
The genus was circumscribed in 2017 by the lichenologists Sergey Kondratyuk and Jae-Seoun Hur, with Nevilleiella marchantii assigned as the type species. Both the genus name Nevilleiella, and the epithet of the type species, marchantii, honour Western Australian botanist Neville Graeme Marchant, who accompanied the authors during their field work.

== Description ==
The genus Nevilleiella consists of crustose lichens, which means they form a crust-like layer over their substrate. These lichens are characterised by almost spherical, pustule-like structures or by discrete, widely spread areoles (small, cracked patches) that do not cover the entire surface. Their colour varies from brownish yellow to brownish orange, and they sometimes have a whitish, powdery coating (pruina). The areoles themselves are quite diverse in shape, ranging from convex and warty to almost spherical, and they occasionally develop schizidia-like formations, which are small, split-off parts of the lichen. The cortex, or the outer layer, has a tightly packed cellular structure (palisade paraplectenchymatous).

The reproductive structures of Nevilleiella, known as apothecia, are typically of the biatorine form, meaning they have a clearly distinguishable margin and disc, but can sometimes become zeorine, where the margin is less distinct. The disc and its own margin are rusty brownish orange or brownish orange, blending in with the thallus. The true exciple, the outer layer of tissue surrounding the reproductive cells, also has a tightly packed cellular structure with a distinct matrix at the base. The subhymenium, the layer beneath the reproductive cells, contains oil droplets. The ascospores are polarilocular, meaning they have two cells divided by a nearly invisible septum (internal partition), which is more visible when treated with a solution of potassium hydroxide. The conidia, a type of asexual spore, are narrowly rod-shaped, measuring 3–4 μm in length and 0.8–1 μm in width.

Chemically, Nevilleiella is defined by the presence of several secondary metabolites (lichen products). Parietin is the major chemical present, with fallacinal as a somewhat major or minor component. It also contains parietinic acid and teloschistin, which are present in minor or trace amounts.

The genus Iqbalia, proposed in 2022 for the Pakistani species Iqbalia kashmirensis, shares similarities with Nevilleiella but can be distinguished by several key differences. Unlike Nevilleiella, Iqbalia features discrete, non-aggregated areoles and lacks schizidia-like formations. Its ascospores have a wide septum when observed in water. Additionally, Iqbalia contains variolaric acid and forms a distinct, strong monophyletic branch within the subfamily Teloschistoideae.

== Habitat and distribution ==
Nevilleiella lichens typically develop as crusty layer on clayey soil in salt-rich environments, as well as in open spaces or mallee regions. It is also found on siliceous rocks along coastlines, as well as in rough pastures, heathlands, and dry sclerophyll forests across the Australian continent.

== Species ==
- Nevilleiella lateritia (Taylor) S.Y.Kondr. & Hur (2017)
- Nevilleiella marchantii (S.Y.Kondr. & Kärnefelt) S.Y.Kondr. & Hur (2017)
