= Kaernefia kaernefeltii =

Scientific classification
- Kingdom: Fungi
- Division: Ascomycota
- Class: Lecanoromycetes
- Order: Teloschistales
- Family: Teloschistaceae
- Genus: Kaernefia
- Species: K. kaernefeltii

Binomial name
- Kaernefia kaernefeltii (S.Y.Kondr., Elix & A.Thell) S.Y.Kondr., A.Thell, Elix, Jung Kim, A.S.Kondr. & Hur (2013)
- Holotype site: near Chittering Lake, Western Australia

Synonyms
- Caloplaca kaernefeltii S.Y.Kondr., Elix & A.Thell (2009)

Species of lichen

Kaernefia kaernefeltii is a species of saxicolous (rock-dwelling), crustose lichen in the family Teloschistaceae. It is widely distributed in Australia.

== Taxonomy ==
The species was first formally described by the lichenologists Sergey Kondratyuk, John Alan Elix, and Arne Thell. The type specimen was collected at the edge of Chittering Lake in Western Australia, where it was found growing on Melaleuca rhaphiophylla and Eucalyptus rudis. The species epithet honours the Swedish lichenologist Ingvar Kärnefelt. In 2013, Ulf Arup and colleagues transferred the taxon was to the newly circumscribed genus Kaernefia, in which it is the type species.

== Description ==
Kaernefia kaernefeltii is characterised by a subtle and underdeveloped thallus, typically consisting of minute granules, warts, or granular-isidia formations. This thallus may appear orange, greenish-orange, or brownish-orange and occasionally presents large, reddish apothecia, which can be either sparsely scattered or densely aggregated. The thalline granules or warts are very small, measuring about 0.05–0.08 mm in width, and range in shape from flat to raised, sometimes clustering into larger formations up to 0.2 mm wide. These granules are typically sorediate, with a dull orange to greenish or brownish-orange colour. The soredia themselves are spherical, measuring around 25–30 μm in diameter, and match the colour of the thalline granules.

In rare cases, a brownish hypothallus is developed. The apothecia of Kaernefia kaernefeltii are notably distinctive, measuring 0.4–2 mm in diameter and 0.25–0.3 mm in thickness. They have a lecanorine form, with a disc that is flat to somewhat concave and coloured in shades of red, rose, or brownish-red. The thalline margin is quite thick, varying from zeorine to biatorine in form, and is often pruinose with a whitish tone, occasionally eroded, displaying colours ranging from rose to rose-yellow or greenish in shaded areas. This margin can be up to 0.4 mm wide.

The thalline exciple includes a cortical layer around 20–30 μm thick, often filled with rhombic crystals. The true exciple has a scleroplectenchymatous texture. The hymenium stands between 55 and 60 μm high, while the subhymenium is a pale straw brown, approximately 15–25 μm thick. The paraphyses, widened at the tips, often contain large, bermaguiana-type oil cells. The asci are eight-spored, producing ascospores that are polarilocular, hyaline, occasionally with orange contents, and ellipsoid in shape. These spores are slightly widened at the septum, with pointed ends, and measure between 9–15 μm in length and 5–8.5 μm in width, with septa measuring 4–8 μm wide.

In terms of chemical composition, the epihymenium and the uppermost lateral portion of the true exciple react to a solution of potassium hydroxide (i.e., the K spot test) test by turning purple to blackish-purple in certain areas. The lichen contains several chemical compounds, including parietin as a major component, O-methylvioxanthin, fallacinal, teloschistin, and trace amounts of atranorin.

== Habitat and distribution ==
Kaernefia kaernefeltii predominantly thrives in the diverse ecosystems of coastal rainforests. It is also found growing in open pastures or on roadside trees. Common arboreal hosts for this species include Acacia ligulata, Myoporum insulare, various species of Leptospermum and Casuarina, as well as Ulmus species. Additionally, it is known to grow on fence posts. This lichen often coexists with several other lichen species, including Caloplaca hanneshertelii, Villophora erythrosticta, Cerothallia yarraensis, Dufourea elixii, and Dufourea filsonii, as well as species from the genera Leptogium, Rinodina, Candelariella, Micarea, and Bacidia. Kaernefia kaernefeltii has been observed in a range of environments, from undisturbed natural areas to urban landscapes.

Kaernefia kaernefeltii is known to inhabit various locations in Australia. Its presence has been recorded in Western Australia, South Australia, Victoria, and Tasmania. The species is found in scattered localities across these regions, indicating a wide but dispersed distribution.

== Similar species ==
Kaernefia kaernefeltii has certain resemblances to the Northern Hemisphere's epiphytic species, Caloplaca herbidella, particularly in its isidia-like formations. However, significant differences distinguish K. kaernefeltii from C. herbidella. These include a less developed thallus in K. kaernefeltii, contrasting with the more pronounced thallus of C. herbidella. Additionally, the apothecia of K. kaernefeltii are of the lecanorine type, characterized by thick white margins, which sets it apart from C. herbidella. Another key difference lies in the oil cells within the paraphyses of K. kaernefeltii, which are broadened and centrally located, a trait not observed in C. herbidella.

Identifying K. kaernefeltii can be challenging due to its variable nature. The isidia-like granules, a defining feature, may not always be present. The pruina on K. kaernefeltii also varies, ranging from absent to thickly deposited. Furthermore, K. kaernefeltii often co-occurs with similar sorediate taxa, such as Caloplaca erythrosticta, making it difficult to distinguish between them. These variations contribute to the complexity of accurately identifying K. kaernefeltii in the field.
