= Xanthomendoza kashiwadanii =

Scientific classification
- Domain: Eukaryota
- Kingdom: Fungi
- Division: Ascomycota
- Class: Lecanoromycetes
- Order: Teloschistales
- Family: Teloschistaceae
- Genus: Xanthomendoza
- Species: X. kashiwadanii

Binomial name
- Xanthomendoza kashiwadanii S.Y.Kondr. & Kärnefelt (2009)

Species of lichen

Xanthomendoza kashiwadanii is a species of saxicolous (rock-dwelling), crustose lichen in the family Teloschistaceae. Found in South America, it was formally described as a new species in 2009 by lichenologists Sergey Kondratyuk and Ingvar Kärnefelt. The type specimen was collected from Morro Chico (Magallanes Region, Chile), at an altitude of 230 m (750 ft), where it was found on a dry rocky cliff growing on rocks. The species epithet honours Japanese lichenologist Hiroyuki Kashiwadani, who collected the type. Xanthomendoza kashiwadanii is only known to occur in a few localities in Argentina and Chile, where it grows on volcanic and basalt rock.
