= Iqbalia =

Scientific classification
- Kingdom: Fungi
- Division: Ascomycota
- Class: Lecanoromycetes
- Order: Teloschistales
- Family: Teloschistaceae
- Genus: Iqbalia; Fayyaz, Afshan & S.Y.Kondr. (2022)
- Species: I. kashmirensis

Binomial name
- Iqbalia kashmirensis Fayyaz, Afshan, Niazi & Khalid (2022)

Species of lichen

Iqbalia is a single-species fungal genus in the family Teloschistaceae. It contains Iqbalia kashmirensis, a saxicolous (rock-dwelling), crustose lichen found in Azad Kashmir, Pakistan.

== Taxonomy ==
Iqbalia was circumscribed in 2022 by Iram Fayyaz, Najam Ul Sehar Afshan, and Sergey Kondratyuk. The genus name honours the Pakistani mycologist S.H. Iqbal, professor at the University of the Punjab, Lahore, Pakistan, "in recognition of his contributions to lichen flora of Pakistan". The species epithet kashmirensis refers to the type locality.

Iqbalia is in the subfamily Teloschistoideae. On the phylogenetic tree of the family Teloschistaceae, it appears on a monophyletic branch between the genera Stellarangia and Kaernefia.

== Description ==
The genus Iqbalia shares similarities with the Australian genus Nevilleiella, particularly in terms of their thallus (the main body of the lichen) colouration, which ranges from brownish-yellow to orange. Both genera also develop pustule-like formations on the surface of their thallus. However, Iqbalia can be distinguished by its distinct areoles (small, isolated patches of thallus), which are separate and not clustered together, unlike those in Nevilleiella. Furthermore, Iqbalia does not form schizidia-like formations, a type of structure resembling small, split-off fragments. Another difference lies in the ascospores; when observed in water, the ascospores of Iqbalia have a wide septum (an internal dividing partition). This characteristic is distinct from what is observed in Nevilleiella.

Chemically, Iqbalia is unique for containing variolaric acid, a secondary metabolite (lichen product) not found in Nevilleiella. Additionally, the two genera differ ecologically in their preferred habitats. Iqbalia typically grows on calcareous rocks, which are rich in calcium carbonate, while Nevilleiella is more commonly found on soil in desert conditions.

== Habitat and distribution ==
Iqbalia kashmirensis is only known to occur at the type locality in Azad Kashmir. There, at an elevation of 817 m (2,680 ft), it grows on calcareous rock.
