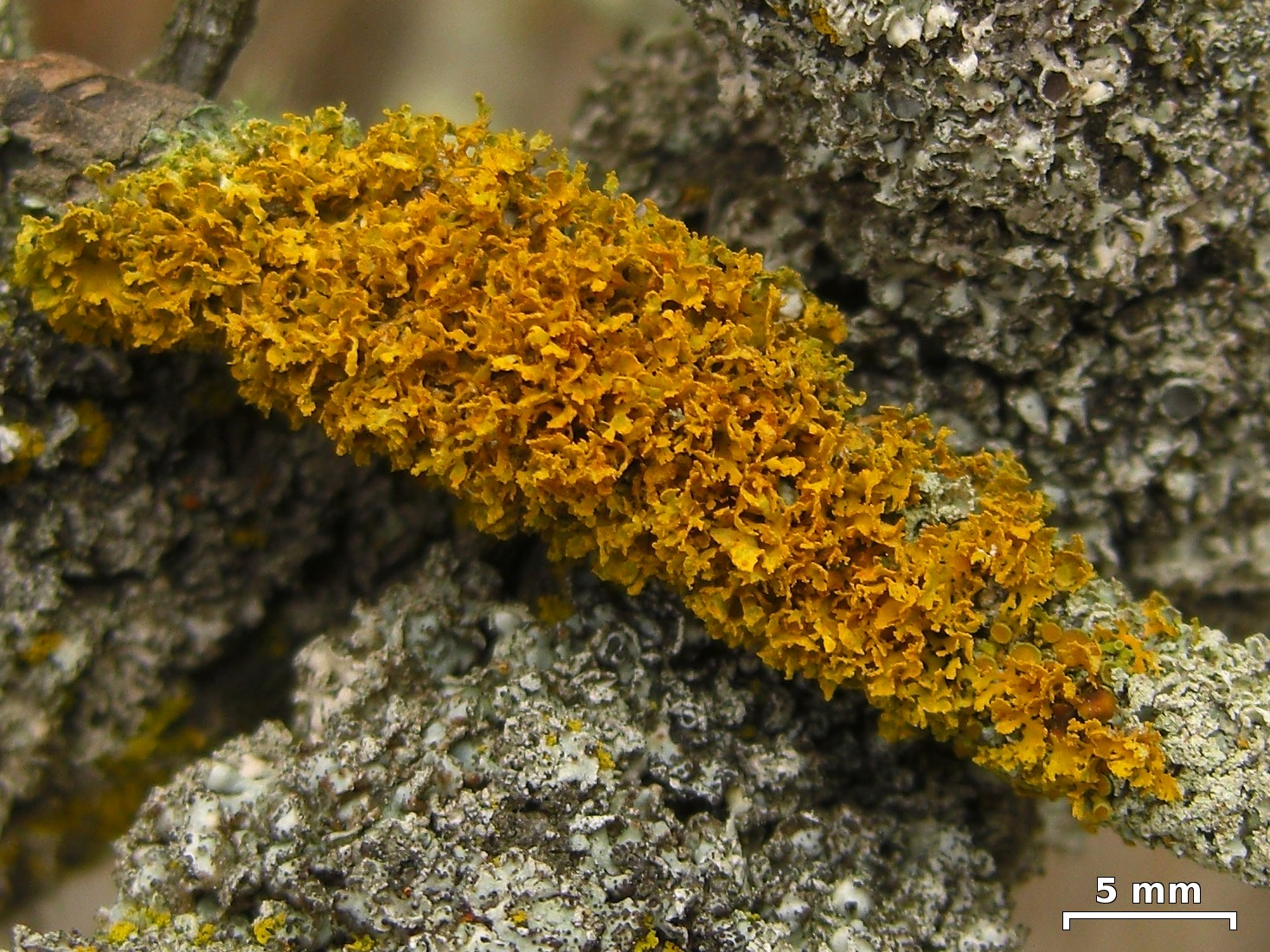

Scientific classification
- Kingdom: Fungi
- Division: Ascomycota
- Class: Lecanoromycetes
- Order: Teloschistales
- Family: Teloschistaceae
- Genus: Xanthomendoza
- Species: X. oregana

Binomial name
- Xanthomendoza oregana (Gyeln.) Søchting, Kärnefelt & S.Y.Kondr. (2002)

Synonyms
- Xanthoria oregana Gyeln. (1934); Xanthomendoza poeltii (S.Y.Kondr. & Kärnefelt) Søchting, Kärnefelt & S.Y.Kondr. (2002); Oxneria oregana (Gyeln.) S.Y.Kondr. & Kärnefelt (2003); Gallowayella oregona (Gyeln.) S.Y.Kondr., Fedorenko, S.Stenroos, Kärnefelt, Elix, Hur & A.Thell (2012)

= Xanthomendoza oregana =

Species of lichen

Xanthomendoza oregana is a species of corticolous (bark-dwelling), foliose lichen in the family Teloschistaceae. It forms an orange to bright-yellow thallus with ascending lobes that gives it the overall appearance of a tuft. The lichen occurs in western and northern Europe and western North America.

== Taxonomy ==
The lichen was first scientifically described in 1932 by the Hungarian lichenologist Vilmos Kőfaragó-Gyelnik, who classified it in the genus Xanthoria. The type specimen was collected in 1932 from Corvallis, Oregon, where it was found growing on maple. Frank Sipe, a botany professor in Oregon, had sent Gyelnik lichen specimens for study. Ulrik Søchting, Ingvar Kärnefelt, and Sergey Kondratyuk transferred the taxon to Xanthomendoza in 2003 as part of a revision of that genus. It has also been proposed for inclusion in the genera Oxneria (in 2003) and Gallowayella (in 2012). In the latter instance, the proposed name "Gallowayella oregona" was not validly published because of errors with the citation of the basionym.

Xanthomendoza poeltii, described by Kondratyuk and Kärnefelt as a new European species in 1997, was synonymised with X. oregana in 2014 based on DNA analysis.

== Description ==
The thallus of Xanthomendosa oregana has a bright yellow to orange upper surface, forming tufts of up to about 3 cm (1.2 in) in diameter. The lobes of this lichen, which are the leaf-like or flattened branches that make up its thallus, tend to lie flat against the surface they grow on but can also rise up slightly. These lobes are generally smooth, though they can sometimes have a slightly wrinkled appearance. A key characteristic of Xanthomendosa oregana is the formation of marginal or near the edge structures known as blastidia, which are involved in asexual reproduction. Rhizines are scattered on the underside, either free or attached to the substrate.

Apothecia (fruiting bodies), which are typically disc-shaped and produce spores, are not commonly found in this species. However, when they do occur, they can be quite numerous on certain individual lichens. Another feature of Xanthomendosa oregana is the frequent presence of pycnidia, which are tiny, flask-shaped structures that produce asexual spores (conidia). The conidia in these pycnidia vary in shape, ranging from ellipsoid to bacilliform (rod-like). Its distribution of secondary metabolites (lichen products) corresponds to the chemosyndrome A previously elaborated by Søchting.

=== Similar species ===
Distinguishing Xanthomendoza oregana from Gallowayella fulva and Xanthoria ulophyllodes can present challenges. In comparison to X. fulva, Gallowayella oregana generally has a larger size with lobes that are both broader and longer, alongside a more substantial upper cortex. Unlike G. fulva, which may form rounded, soredia-filled structures reminiscent of "bird nests" at the tips of its lobes, X. oregana typically produces soredia along the edges and just inside the margins of the cortex.

When compared to Xanthoria ulophyllodes, Xanthomendoza oregana is noted to have somewhat slimmer lobes and a less thick upper cortex. Additionally, Xanthomendoza oregana does not form the structured, rosette-like thallus seen in Xanthoria ulophyllodes, which is characterised by tightly appressed marginal lobes.

== Habitat and distribution ==
Xanthomendoza oregana is part of a biogeographical group that is found in both western Europe and western North America, known as the western Europe–western North America disjunct biogeographical element. In the western regions of North America, particularly in the Pacific oceanic and suboceanic areas, Xanthomendoza oregana is quite widespread. In Europe, this species has been identified in several countries, though it was previously reported under a different name (X. poeltii). It has been observed in Hungary, Germany, Denmark, southern Sweden, and southern Norway. The full extent of its geographical distribution remains somewhat unclear.

Unlike many other lichens and bryophytes that share this transatlantic distribution, Xanthomendoza oregana primarily inhabits lowland temperate areas. This corticolous lichen typically grows on deciduous trees, often in open spaces. In southern Sweden, for example, it is commonly found on trees in parks and churchyards, indicating its preference for semi-urban environments where there is sufficient light and air circulation.
