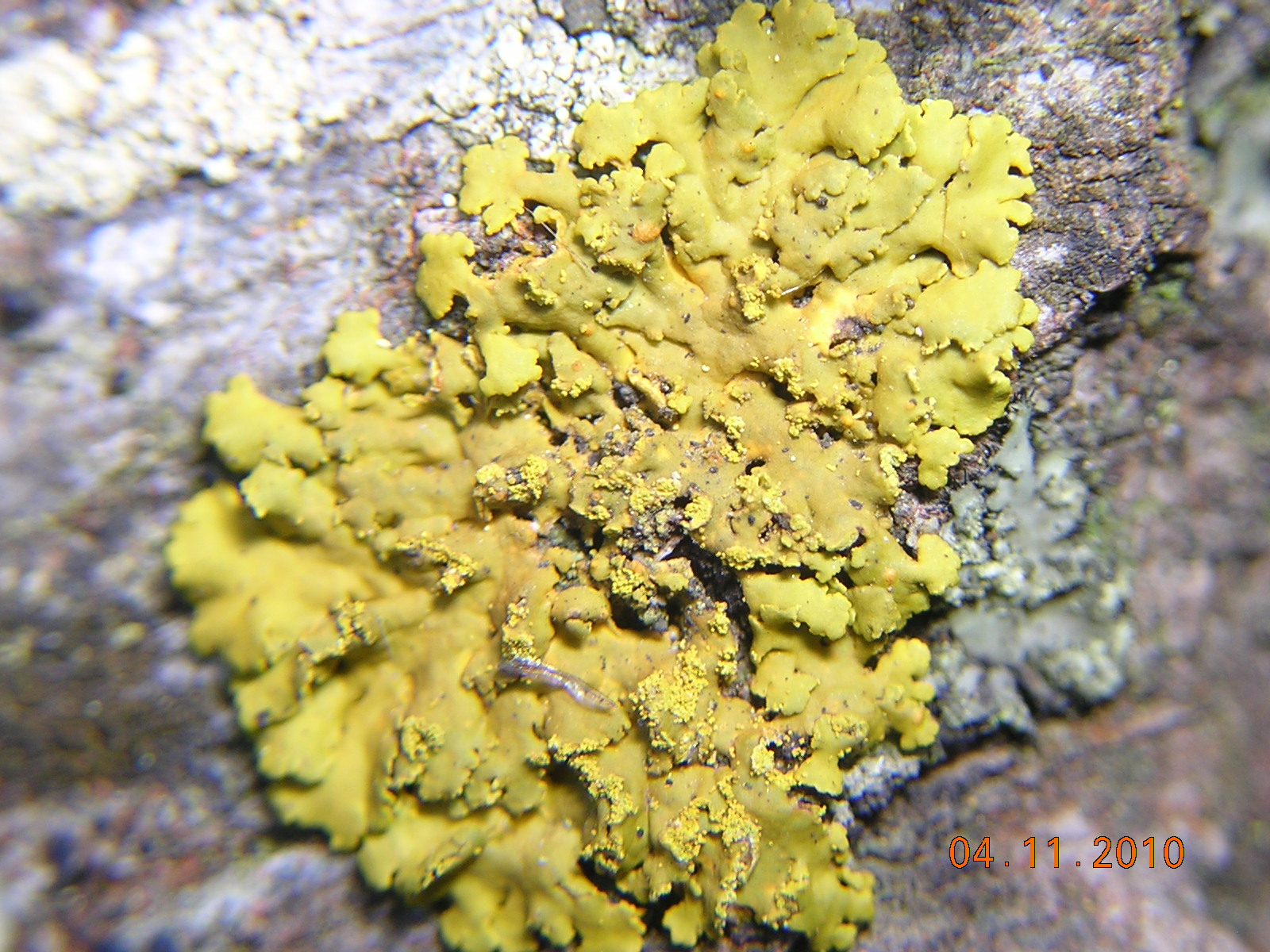

Scientific classification
- Kingdom: Fungi
- Division: Ascomycota
- Class: Lecanoromycetes
- Order: Teloschistales
- Family: Teloschistaceae
- Genus: Gallowayella
- Species: G. fulva

Binomial name
- Gallowayella fulva (Hoffm.) S.Y.Kondr., Fedorenko, S.Stenroos, Kärnefelt, Elix, Hur & A.Thell (2012)

Synonyms
- Lobaria fulva Hoffm. (1796); Oxneria fulva (Hoffm.) S.Y.Kondr. & Kärnefelt (2003); Physcia lychnea var. fulva (Hoffm.) Stizenb. (1882); Xanthomendoza fulva (Hoffm.) Søchting, Kärnefelt & S.Y.Kondr. (2002); Xanthoria fulva (Hoffm.) Poelt & Petut. (1992)

= Gallowayella fulva =

Species of lichen

Gallowayella fulva is a species of foliose lichen in the family Teloschistaceae. It was first scientifically described in 1796 by German lichenologist Georg Franz Hoffmann, who classified it as a member of genus Lobaria. It has also been classified in the genera Oxneria, Xanthomendoza and Xanthoria in its taxonomic history. Sergey Kondratyuk and colleagues transferred the taxon to the genus Gallowayella in 2012, based on a molecular phylogenetics-based restructuring of some genera in the subfamily Xanthorioideae of family Teloschistaceae. In North America, one vernacular name for the species is the bare-bottomed sunburst lichen.

Gallowayella fulva is widely distributed, occurring in Asia, Europe, and North America. It grows on bark, typically oak and elm, but has in some rare instances been recorded growing on rock. In Nepal, it has been reported from 2,700 to 3,200 m elevation in a compilation of published records.
