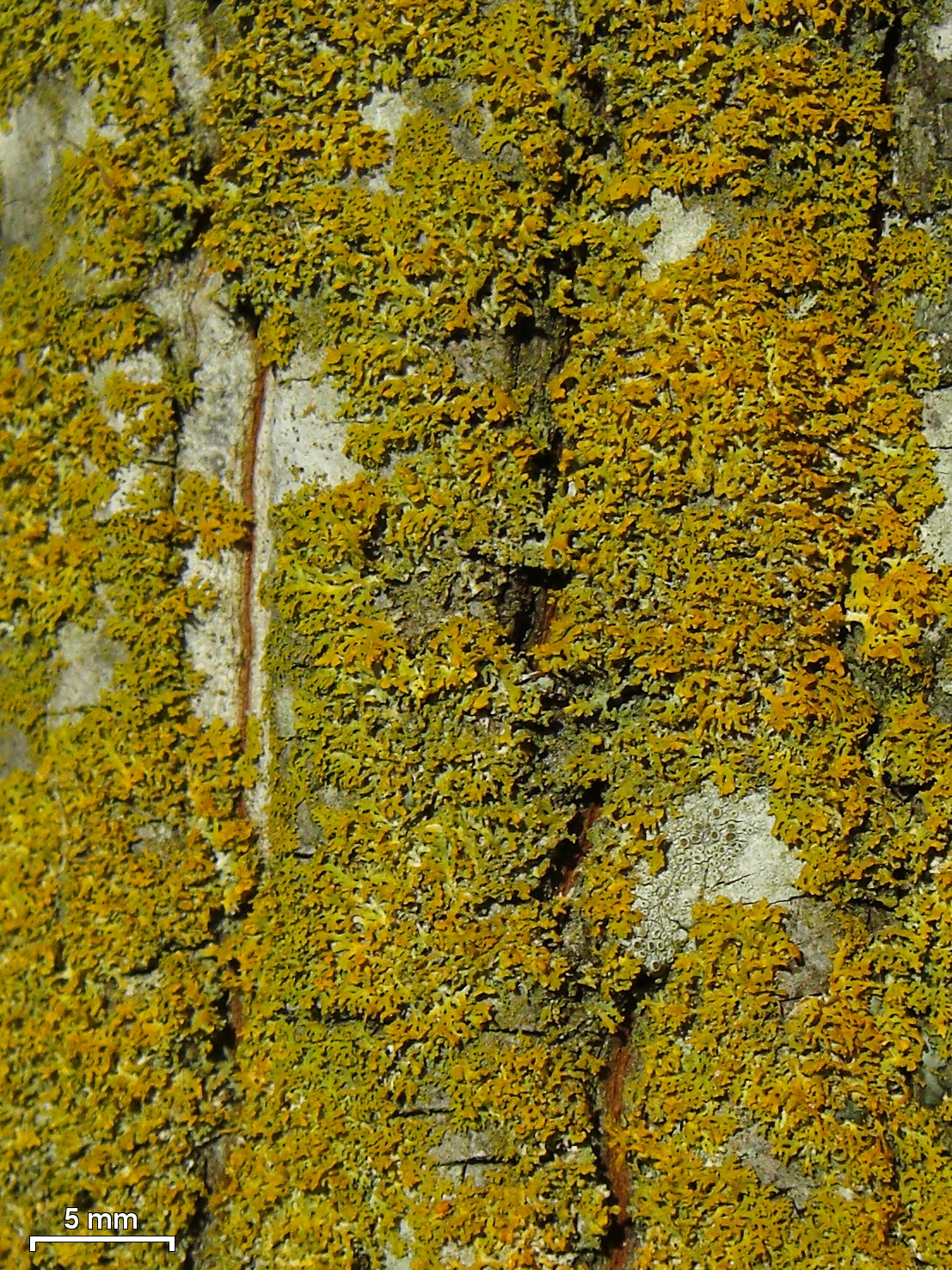
- Gallowayella weberi in Delmarva, USA

Scientific classification
- Kingdom: Fungi
- Division: Ascomycota
- Class: Lecanoromycetes
- Order: Teloschistales
- Family: Teloschistaceae
- Genus: Gallowayella; S.Y.Kondr., Fedorenko, S.Stenroos, Kärnefelt, Elix & A.Thell (2012)

Type species
- Gallowayella coppinsii (S.Y.Kondr. & Kärnefelt) S.Y.Kondr., Fedorenko, S.Stenroos, Kärnefelt, Elix & A.Thell (2012)

= Gallowayella =

Genus of lichen-forming fungi

Gallowayella is a genus of lichen-forming fungi in the family Teloschistaceae. It has 15 species. The genus was circumscribed in 2012 by Sergey Kondratyuk, Natalya Fedorenko, Soili Stenroos, Ingvar Kärnefelt, Jack Elix, and Arne Thell, with Gallowayella coppinsii assigned as the type species. The generic name honours New Zealand lichenologist David John Galloway (1942–2014).

== Species ==
As of September 2023, Species Fungorum (in the Catalogue of Life) include 15 species in Gallowayella:

- Gallowayella aphrodites (Kalb, Poelt & S.Y.Kondr.) S.Y.Kondr., Fedorenko, S.Stenroos, Kärnefelt, Elix, Hur & A.Thell (2012)
- Gallowayella awasthiana S.Y.Kondr. & D.K.Upreti (2018)
- Gallowayella borealis (R.Sant. & Poelt) S.Y.Kondr., Fedorenko, S.Stenroos, Kärnefelt, Elix, Hur & A.Thell (2012)
- Gallowayella concinna (J.W.Thomson & T.H.Nash) S.Y.Kondr., Fedorenko, S.Stenroos, Kärnefelt, Elix, Hur & A.Thell (2012)
- Gallowayella coppinsii (S.Y.Kondr. & Kärnefelt) S.Y.Kondr., Fedorenko, S.Stenroos, Kärnefelt, Elix & A.Thell (2012)
- Gallowayella fulva (Hoffm.) S.Y.Kondr., Fedorenko, S.Stenroos, Kärnefelt, Elix, Hur & A. Thell (2012)
- Gallowayella galericulata (L.Lindblom) S.Y.Kondr., Fedorenko, S.Stenroos, Kärnefelt, Elix, Hur & A.Thell (2012)
- Gallowayella gallowayi (S.Y.Kondr. & Kärnefelt) S.Y.Kondr., Fedorenko, S.Stenroos, Kärnefelt, Elix, Hur & A.Thell (2012)
- Gallowayella hasseana (Räsänen) S.Y.Kondr., Fedorenko, S.Stenroos, Kärnefelt, Elix, Hur & A. Thell (2012)
- Gallowayella montana (L.Lindblom) S.Y.Kondr., Fedorenko, S.Stenroos, Kärnefelt, Elix, Hur & A. Thell (2012)
- Gallowayella poeltii (S.Y.Kondr. & Kärnefelt) S.Y.Kondr., Fedorenko, S.Stenroos, Kärnefelt, Elix, Hur & A.Thell (2012)
- Gallowayella sogdiana (S.Y.Kondr. & Kärnefelt) S.Y.Kondr., Fedorenko, S.Stenroos, Kärnefelt, Elix, Hur & A.Thell (2012)
- Gallowayella tibellii (S.Y.Kondr. & Kärnefelt) S.Y.Kondr., Fedorenko, S.Stenroos, Kärnefelt, Elix, Hur & A.Thell (2012)
- Gallowayella weberi (S.Y.Kondr. & Kärnefelt) S.Y.Kondr., Fedorenko, S.Stenroos, Kärnefelt, Elix, Hur & A.Thell (2012)
- Gallowayella wetmorei (S.Y.Kondr. & Kärnefelt) S.Y.Kondr., Fedorenko, S.Stenroos, Kärnefelt, Elix, Hur & A.Thell (2012)

Two species once proposed for inclusion in Gallowayella are now included in other genera:

- Gallowayella hermonii (S.Y.Kondr.) S.Y.Kondr., Fedorenko, S.Stenroos, Kärnefelt, Elix, Hur & A.Thell (2012) is now Xanthomendoza hermonii
- Gallowayella oregona (Gyeln.) S.Y.Kondr., Fedorenko, S.Stenroos, Kärnefelt, Elix, Hur & A.Thell (2012) was not validly published because of errors with the citation of the basionym. It is now Xanthomendoza oregana.
