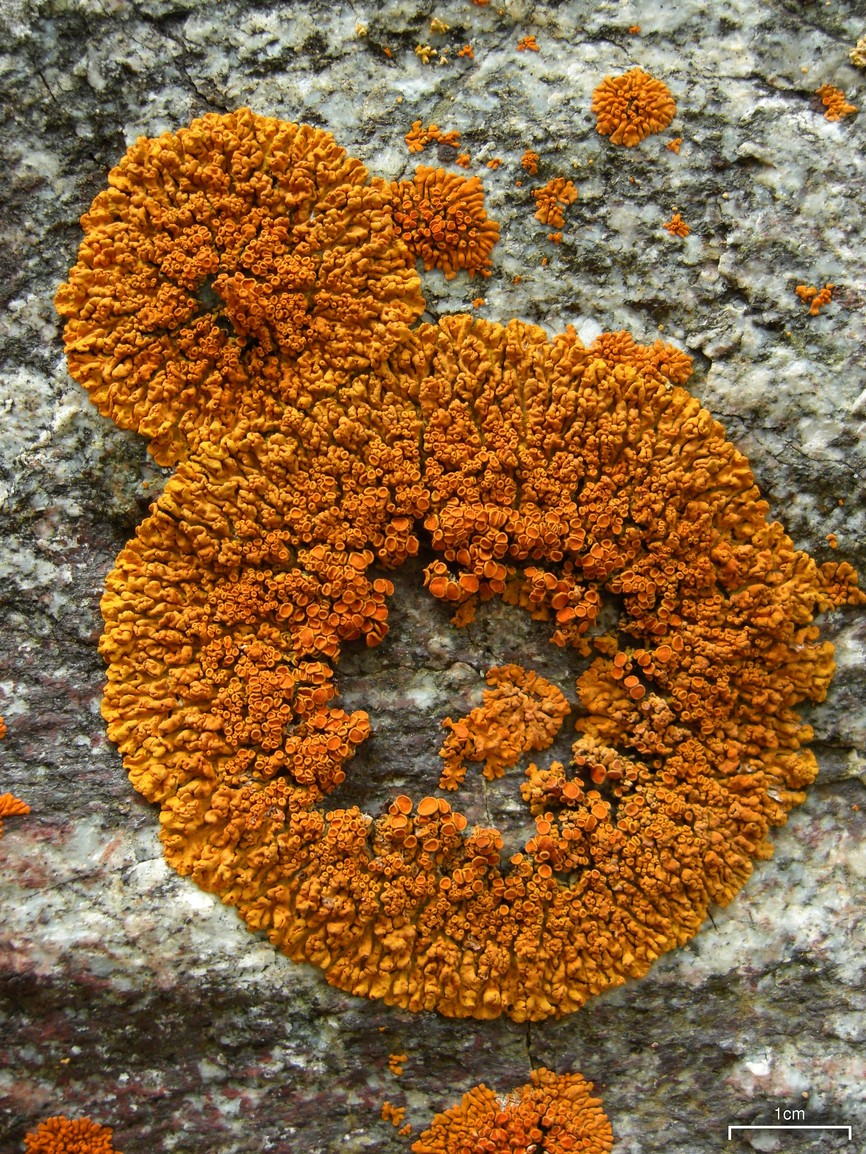
- in the San Gabriel Mountains, Southern California

Scientific classification
- Domain: Eukaryota
- Kingdom: Fungi
- Division: Ascomycota
- Class: Lecanoromycetes
- Order: Teloschistales
- Family: Teloschistaceae
- Genus: Golubkovia; S.Y.Kondr., Kärnefelt, Elix, A.Thell & Hur (2014)
- Species: G. trachyphylla

Binomial name
- Golubkovia trachyphylla (Tuck.) S.Y.Kondr., Kärnefelt, Elix, A.Thell, J.Kim, M.H.Jeong, N.N.Yu, A.S.Kondr. & Hur (2014)

Synonyms
- Caloplaca elegans var. trachyphylla (Tuck.) Fink (1935); Caloplaca trachyphylla (Tuck.) Zahlbr. (1931); Placodium elegans var. trachyphyllum Tuck. (1882); Xanthomendoza trachyphylla (Tuck.) Frödén (2013)

= Golubkovia =

Single-species genus of lichen

Golubkovia is a single-species fungal genus in the family Teloschistaceae. It contains the species Golubkovia trachyphylla, a rock-dwelling lichen that is found in Asia and North America. This crustose lichen has a yellow-orange thallus that is placodioid in form (i.e., comprising lobes that radiate out from a centre).

== Taxonomy ==
The genus was circumscribed in 2014 by the lichenologists Sergey Kondratyuk, Ingvar Kärnefelt, John Elix, Arne Thell, and Jae-Seoun Hur. The generic name honours Russian lichenologist Nina Golubkova (1932–2009), who, according to the authors, "made important contributions to lichenology in northern Eurasia". In North America, "sunny straps" is one vernacular name that has been proposed for the species.

Golubkovia belongs to a clade contains the genus Xanthomendoza, with which it shares the characteristic of having a well-developed, thick layer of plectenchyma in the medulla. Unlike Xanthomendoza, Golubkovia does not have a lower cortical layer, it has an upper cortical layer that is scleroplectenchymatous, and it has a prosoplectenchymatous true exciple (the ring-shaped layer surrounding the hymenium). Additionally, the lichen is attached differently to its substrate.

== Habitat and distribution ==
Golubkovia trachyphylla is a widely distributed lichen found in Asia and North America, where it grows on rocks in arid habitat. It does not show any substrate preference for calcareous or non-calcareous rocks. It has a yellow-orange, crustose thallus that is placodioid in form (i.e., comprising lobes that radiate out from a centre).

== Chemistry ==
It contains emodin, fallacinal, parietin, parietinic acid, and teloschistin as lichen products, and its cortex reacts K+ (purple) in chemical spot testing.
