= Rosmarie Honegger =

Swiss lichenologist

- Born: 1947 (age 78–79); Switzerland
- Education: University of Basel
- Awards: Acharius Medal; Linnean Medal
- Scientific career
- Fields: Lichenology
- Workplaces: University of California, Riverside; University of Zurich
- Author abbrev. (botany): Honegger

Rosmarie Honegger (born 1947) is a Swiss lichenologist and Emeritus Professor at the University of Zurich.

== Academic career ==
Honegger was born in 1947 and grew up in Emmental, Switzerland. She developed an early interest in plants, and was recommended to study lichens by a biology teacher. This led to a research project involving compiling a flora of her home town, which, in 1967, led to her earning a prize at an international science fair in San Francisco. The same year, she began studies at the University of Basel.

Honegger earned her PhD in biology from the University of Basel in 1976. Her doctoral research examined the structure and function of the ascus (the spore-bearing structure) in the lichen genus Lecanora, using microscopic techniques. In 1977 she accepted a postdoctoral research position in the Institute of Plant Biology at the University of Zurich. After a time working at the University of California, Riverside she returned to Switzerland as professor in the Institute of Plant Biology of the University of Zurich. Honegger retired in 2009 as Emeritus Professor. From 2011 she worked with Dianne Edwards, a palaeobotanist at the Cardiff University on lichen fossils found on the Welsh borderland.

Honegger was awarded the International Association for Lichenology's Acharius Medal for her lifetime work in lichenology in 2008 and in 2015 she received the Linnean Medal recognising her contribution to the natural sciences. She was one of the "Fifty influential lichenologists" discussed in Ingvar Kärnefelt's 2011 review of the scientific progress of lichenology and the scientists who study it.

The standard author abbreviation Honegger is used to indicate this person as the author when citing a botanical name.

Among the lichens named in her honour is Xanthomendoza rosmarieae, described in 2011 by Sergey Kondratyuk and Kärnefelt.

== Selected publications ==
- Honegger, Rosmarie (1998). "The Lichen Symbiosis—What is so Spectacular about it?". The Lichenologist. 30 (03): 193. doi:10.1017/s002428299200015x. Wikidata Q55968022.
- Honegger, Rosmarie (2000). "Simon Schwendener (1829–1919) and the Dual Hypothesis of Lichens". The Bryologist. 103 (2): 307–313. doi:10.1639/0007-2745(2000)103[0307:ssatdh]2.0.co;2. Wikidata Q55879223.
- Martina Peter; François Ayer; Egli, Simon; Honegger, Rosmarie (2001). "Above- and below-ground community structure of ectomycorrhizal fungi in three Norway spruce (Picea abies) stands in Switzerland". Canadian Journal of Botany (in French). 79 (10): 1134–1151. doi:10.1139/b01-092. Wikidata Q59347057.
- Honegger, Rosmarie; Edwards, Dianne; Lindsey Axe (2012). "The earliest records of internally stratified cyanobacterial and algal lichens from the Lower Devonian of the Welsh Borderland". New Phytologist. 197 (1): 264–275. doi:10.1111/nph.12009. PMID 23110612. Wikidata Q47818255.
- Shyam Nyati; Bhattacharya, Debashish; Werth, Silke; Honegger, Rosmarie (2013). "Phylogenetic analysis of LSU and SSU rDNA group I introns of lichen photobionts associated with the genera Xanthoria and Xanthomendoza (Teloschistaceae, lichenized Ascomycetes)". Journal of Phycology. 49 (6). doi:10.1111/jpy.12126. PMC 3885279. PMID 24415800. Wikidata Q37451353.
- Edwards, Dianne; Honegger, Rosmarie; Lindsey Axe; Jennifer L Morris (2018). "Anatomically preserved Silurian 'nematophytes' from the Welsh Borderland (UK)". Botanical Journal of the Linnean Society. 187 (2): 272–291. doi:10.1093/botlinnean/boy022. Wikidata Q56520776.
