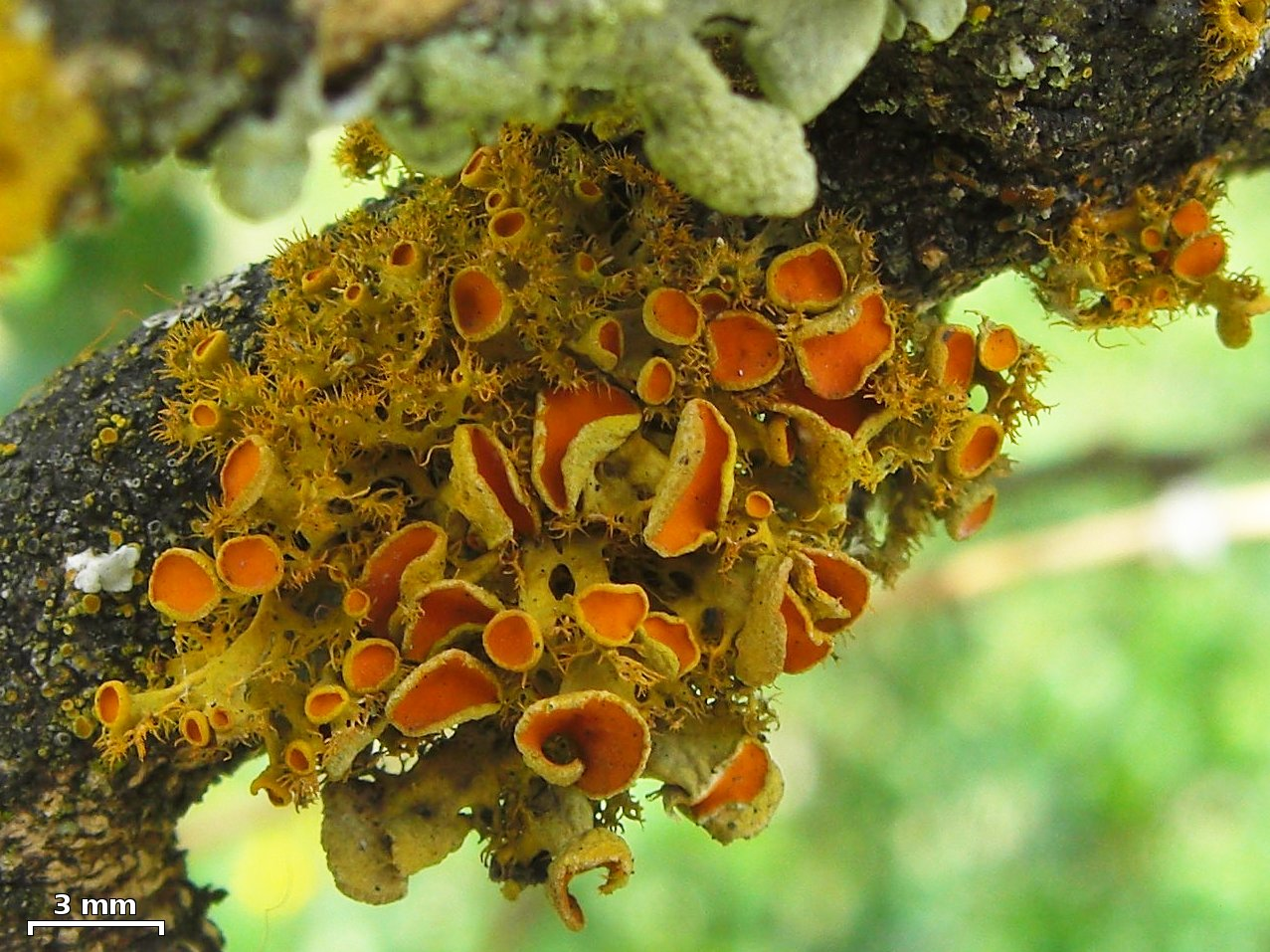
- in Peru

Scientific classification
- Domain: Eukaryota
- Kingdom: Fungi
- Division: Ascomycota
- Class: Lecanoromycetes
- Order: Teloschistales
- Family: Teloschistaceae
- Genus: Niorma
- Species: N. hosseusiana

Binomial name
- Niorma hosseusiana (Gyeln.) S.Y.Kondr., Kärnefelt, Elix, A.Thell, M.H.Jeong & Hur (2013)

Synonyms
- Teloschistes hosseusianus Gyeln. (1942)

= Niorma hosseusiana =

Species of lichen

Niorma hosseusiana is a species of corticolous (bark-dwelling), fruticose lichen in the family Teloschistaceae. It is found in South America.

== Taxonomy ==
The species was first formally described in 1942 by Hungarian lichenologist Vilmos Kőfaragó-Gyelnik, as a member of genus Teloschistes. The type specimens were collected from Argentina. The taxon was transferred to the newly resurrected genus Niorma by Sergey Kondratyuk and colleagues in 2013.

== Description ==
Niorma hosseusiana has a fruticose (shrub-like) thallus that is densely branched and measures approximately 10–15 mm (0.4–0.6 in) in diameter. This lichen adopts a pulvinate (cushion-shaped) to slightly rising form. Its main lobes are flattened and clearly dorsiventral (having distinct upper and lower sides), with widths ranging from 0.5 to 1.5 mm.

The upper side of the thallus is flat and possesses a matte, orange-yellow hue, though occasionally it can appear more greyish-yellow. This surface is smooth, frequently marked with striations, and lacks both a hairy (tomentose) texture and powdery coating (pruinose). The species does not display soralia or isidia, structures associated with reproduction in some lichens.

The lichen's underside is mostly devoid of a protective outer layer (decorticate), presenting a flat to channel-like (canaliculate) appearance. It ranges in colour from grey to a faint greyish-yellow, with longitudinal striations that sometimes form a net-like pattern. This underside does not have hairs (rhizines). All branches of this lichen are densely surrounded at their edges by mostly straight fibrils, which can vary in colour from grey to yellow. Some fibrils may even have dark tips.

Niorma hosseusiana has numerous apothecia (disk-shaped structures for reproduction). These are located at the ends of the lichen's branches and can either sit directly on the thallus (sessile) or have a small stalk (substipitate). Their size ranges from 1–2.5 mm in diameter. The central disk of the apothecium is either flat or slightly concave, displaying an orange-red colour without a powdery coating. Its underside is coarse, featuring a texture that varies from granular to net-like, and its colour spans from pale yellow to grey. The edge or margin of the apothecium is pronounced and usually smooth, though on rare occasions, it can appear slightly granular. This margin does not have fibrils.

Inside the apothecium, the asci measure approximately 65–70 by 12–15 μm. The ascospores have a polaribilocular (two-chambered) structure and an ellipsoid shape, with sizes averaging 11–15 by 4–8 μm.
