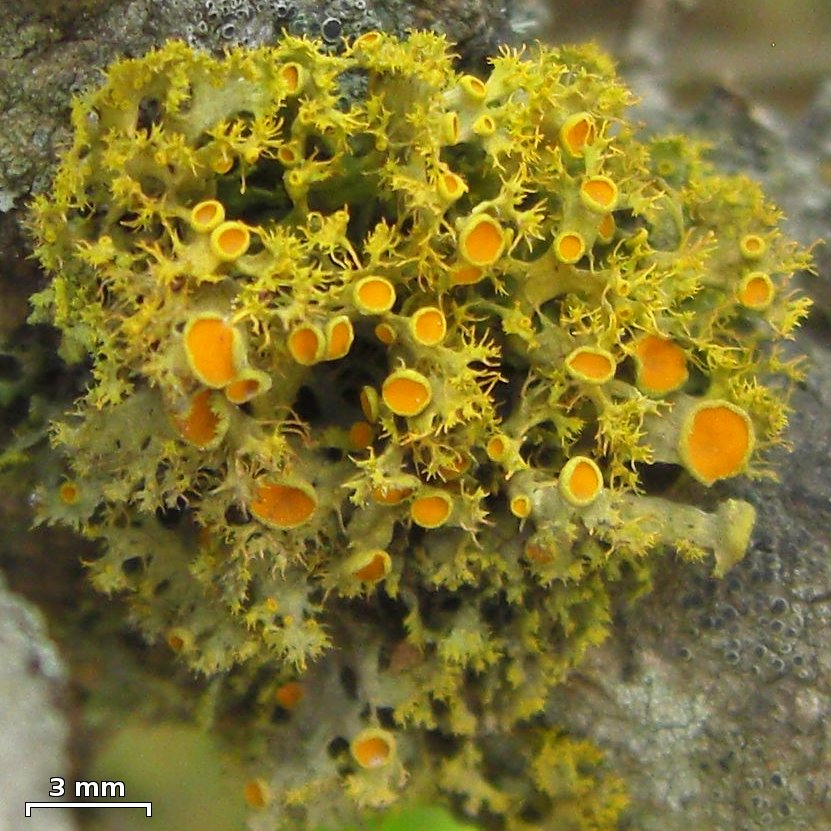
- Niorma hosseusiana

Scientific classification
- Kingdom: Fungi
- Division: Ascomycota
- Class: Lecanoromycetes
- Order: Teloschistales
- Family: Teloschistaceae
- Genus: Niorma; A.Massal. (1861)

Type species
- Niorma derelicta A.Massal. (1861)

= Niorma =

Genus of lichen-forming fungi

Niorma is a genus of lichen-forming fungi in the family Teloschistaceae. It has six fruticose species, with N. derelicta assigned as the type species. The genus was originally proposed by Italian lichenologist Abramo Bartolommeo Massalongo in 1861, but this and several other genera he proposed were largely ignored by later contemporaries. As part of a molecular phylogenetics-led restructuring of the teloschistoid clade of the subfamily Xanthorioideae in the Teloschistaceae, Sergey Kondratyuk and colleagues resurrected the genus for use about 150 years later. Genus Niorma comprises what was previously known as a species complex centred around the taxon previously known as Teloschistes hypoglaucus.

The use of the genus has not been fully accepted by contemporary lichenologists. In a 2021 research paper, Wilk and colleagues suggest that "Teloschistes forms a genetically diverse but strongly supported clade", and they prefer to use the older classification proposed by Arup et al. in 2013 until more data are available.

== Species ==
- Niorma arabica (Frödén) S.Y.Kondr., Kärnefelt, Elix, A.Thell, M.H.Jeong & Hur (2013)
- Niorma chrysophthalma (L.) S.Y.Kondr., Kärnefelt, Elix, A.Thell, M.H.Jeong & Hur (2013)
- Niorma derelicta A.Massal. (1861)
- Niorma hosseusiana (Gyeln.) S.Y.Kondr., Kärnefelt, Elix, A.Thell, M.H.Jeong & Hur (2013)
- Niorma hypoglauca (Nyl.) S.Y.Kondr., Kärnefelt, Elix, A.Thell, M.H.Jeong & Hur (2013)
- Niorma pulviniformis Kalb & Aptroot (2024)
