= Kaernefia =

Scientific classification
- Domain: Eukaryota
- Kingdom: Fungi
- Division: Ascomycota
- Class: Lecanoromycetes
- Order: Teloschistales
- Family: Teloschistaceae
- Genus: Kaernefia; S.Y.Kondr., Elix, A.Thell & Hur (2013)

Type species
- Kaernefia kaernefeltii (S.Y.Kondr., Elix & A.Thell) S.Y.Kondr., A.Thell, Elix, Jung Kim, A.S.Kondr. & Hur (2013)

Species
- K. albocrenulata K. gilfillaniorum K. kaernefeltii

Genus of fungi

Kaernefia is a genus of crustose lichens in the family Teloschistaceae. It has three species, found in Australia or South Africa.

== Taxonomy ==
Kaernefia was circumscribed in 2013 by Sergey Kondratyuk, John Elix, Arne Thell, and Jae-Seoun Hur, based on a molecular phylogenetic analysis of the family Teloschistaceae. They assigned Kaernefia kaernefeltii as the type species of the new genus. The generic name honours their colleague, Swedish lichenologist Ingvar Kärnefelt, for "his many contributions to lichenology, in particular lichens of the Teloschistaceae and Parmeliaceae".

== Description ==
Species in Kaernefia have a poorly developed, indistinct thallus comprising tiny granules or granule-like isidia. It ranges in colour from yellow, to orange to greenish orange or brownish orange. It produces lecanorine apothecia with a thick margin. Lichen products reported from the genus include parietin and O-methylvioxanthin as major compounds, and trace amounts of fallacinal, teloschistin and atranorin.

== Species ==
All three species of Kaernefia were previously classified in the genus Caloplaca.

- Kaernefia albocrenulata (S.Y. Kondr. & V. Wirth) S.Y.Kondr., A.Thell, Elix, Jung Kim, A.S.Kondr. & Hur (2013) – South Africa
- Kaernefia gilfillaniorum (Kantvilas & S.Y. Kondr.) S.Y.Kondr., A.Thell, Elix, Jung Kim, A.S.Kondr. & Hur (2013) – Australia
- Kaernefia kaernefeltii (S.Y. Kondr., Elix & A. Thell) S.Y.Kondr., A.Thell, Elix, Jung Kim, A.S.Kondr. & Hur (2013) – Australia
