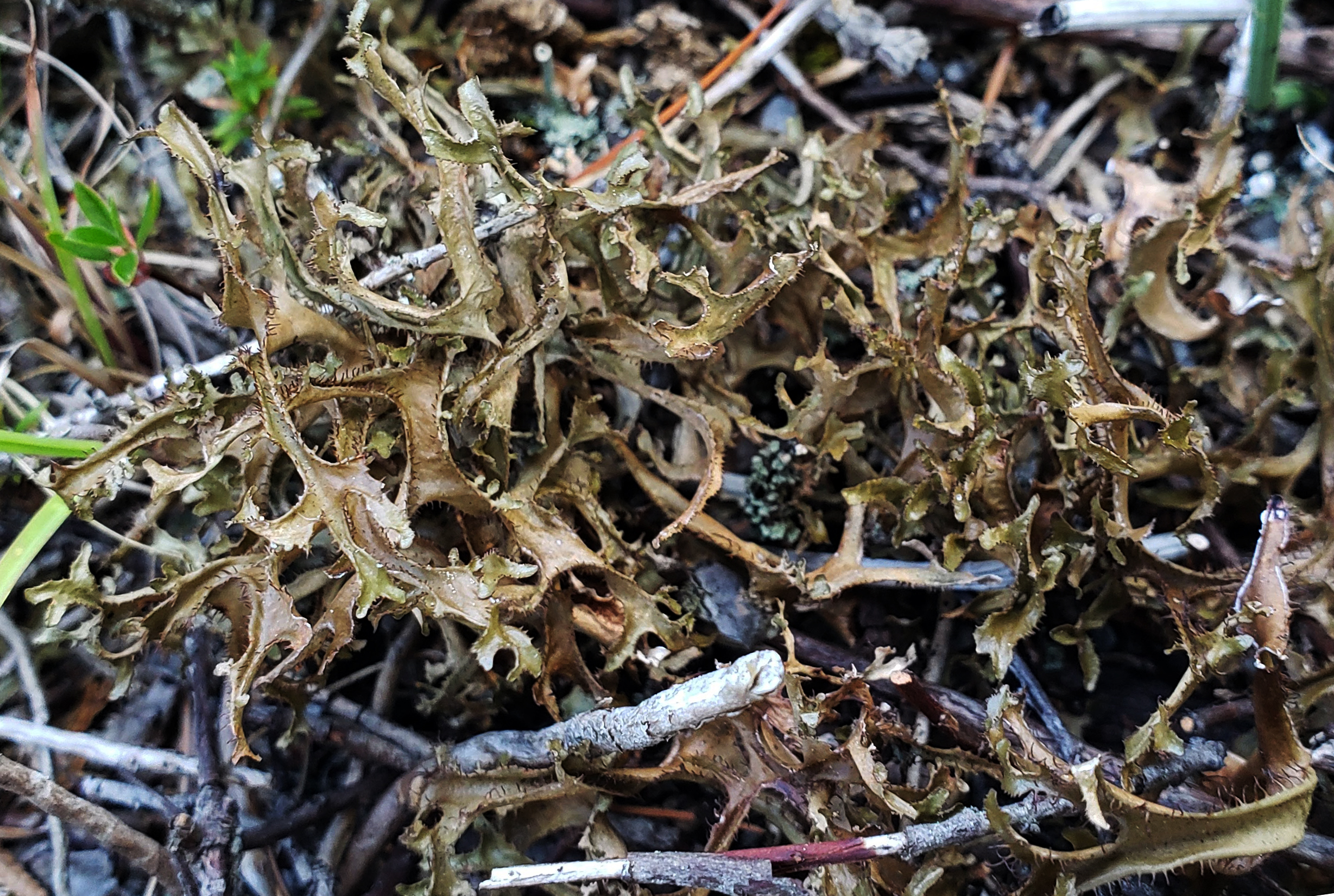

Conservation status
- Apparently Secure (NatureServe)

Scientific classification
- Kingdom: Fungi
- Division: Ascomycota
- Class: Lecanoromycetes
- Order: Lecanorales
- Family: Parmeliaceae
- Genus: Cetraria
- Species: C. arenaria

Binomial name
- Cetraria arenaria Kärnefelt (1977)

= Cetraria arenaria =

Species of lichen

Cetraria arenaria, commonly known as the sand-loving Iceland lichen, is a species of terricolous (ground-dwelling), fruticose lichen in the family Parmeliaceae. It was formally described as a new species in 1977 by the Norwegian lichenologist Ingvar Kärnefelt. The type specimen was collected in 1949 by Henry Imshaug from Mackinac County, Michigan, where he found it growing on sandy soil.

== Description ==
The thallus of Cetraria arenaria is gray-olive to olive-brown in color, comprising regularly branched, flat or curled lobes that are 1–4 mm wide. The lobes have pseudocyphellae (pores on the cortex) that are either broad and located along the margins, or irregularly shaped, depressed into the cortex, and all over the thallus surface. Apothecia (fruiting bodies) occur rarely in this species; they have a reddish-brown disc and are along the expanded tips of the lobes. The lichen has asci that measure between 35 and 50 micrometers (μm) in length and 10 to 12 μm in width. The spores are ellipsoidal, with dimensions of 5.5 to 6 μm in length and 3.5 to 4 μm in width, containing an axial body approximately 1 μm thick. The maximum thickness of the tholus, a thickened part of the ascus apex, is around 2.5 μm. Paraphyses, which are sterile filamentous structures among the asci, measure 40 to 50 μm in length and 1 to 2 μm in width. The lichen also contains cortical tissue beneath the pycnidia, specialized structures producing asexual spores called conidia. The conidia are oblong and lemon-shaped (citriform), measuring about 5 μm in length and 1 μm in width.

== Habitat and distribution ==
Cetraria arenaria is found in temperate lowland regions of North America, growing in sandy soils or thin layers of soil overlaying bedrock. Its distribution spans from the New England states across to the Northern Great Plains, where it is not uncommon in these particular habitats.
