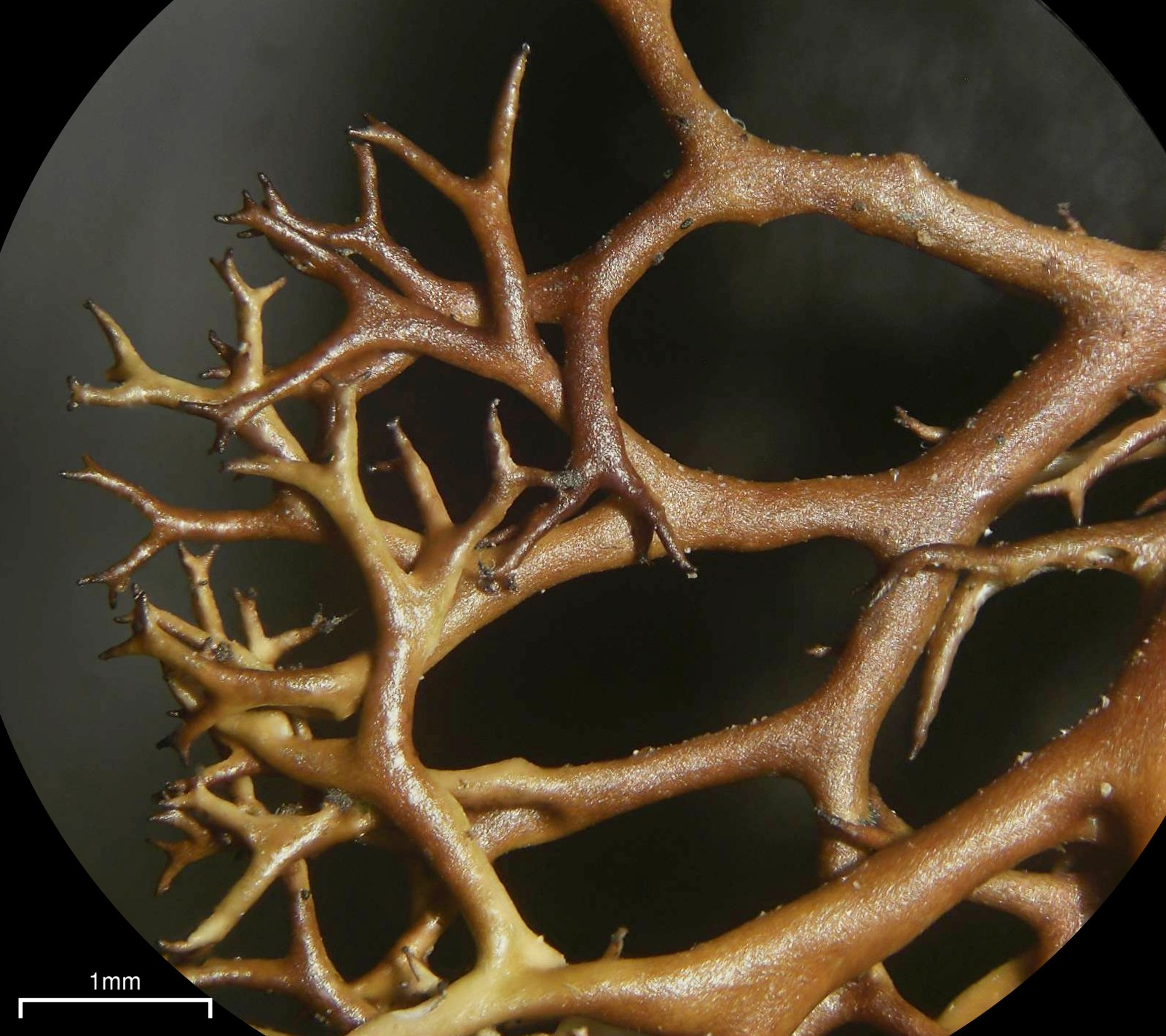
- Bryocaulon (not identified to species)

Scientific classification
- Kingdom: Fungi
- Division: Ascomycota
- Class: Lecanoromycetes
- Order: Lecanorales
- Family: Parmeliaceae
- Genus: Bryocaulon; Kärnefelt (1986)

Type species
- Bryocaulon divergens (Ach.) Kärnefelt (1986)

Species
- B. divergens B. hyperboreum B. pseudosatoanum B. satoanum

= Bryocaulon =

Genus of lichen-forming fungi

Bryocaulon is a small genus of lichen-forming fungi in the family Parmeliaceae. The genus has a widespread distribution in north temperate regions, and contains four species. These lichens form shrub-like tufts with cylindrical branches that are covered in tiny white pores for gas exchange. They are found mainly in cold regions of the Northern Hemisphere, particularly in arctic and mountainous areas where they grow on acidic bark and rocks.

== Taxonomy ==
The genus was circumscribed by the Swedish lichenologist Ingvar Kärnefelt in 1986. He originally included three species in Bryocaulon, including the widespread Bryocaulon divergens as the type species. A fourth species, identified from Svalbard, was added to the genus in 2009.

== Description ==
The thallus of Bryocaulon grows as a fruticose (shrub-like) tuft that may stand upright, dangle from twigs, or sprawl across the substrate. Its branches are mostly cylindrical, though some flatten slightly, and they range in colour from pale greenish-yellow through olive to almost blackish brown as they age or dry. A thin outer skin (cortex) is built from tightly packed, angular fungal cells—a so-called prosoplectenchyma—and is peppered with conspicuous whitish pseudocyphellae, tiny breaks in the cortex that facilitate gas exchange. The internal photobiont alga belongs to the Trebouxia group. Chemical spot tests and thin-layer chromatography reveal the presence of olivetoric and physodic acids.

Sexual fruiting bodies are apothecia that sit sparsely on the branches and share the branch colour. They are zeorine in form: a narrow rim of thallus tissue (the thalline margin) surrounds the disc but quickly thins so that the fertile surface appears flush with the cortex. Each club-shaped ascus conforms to the Lecanora model and usually contains eight smooth, colourless, single-celled ascospores that are ellipsoid in outline. Asexual reproduction occurs in scattered, sunken pycnidia; these flask-shaped cavities release minute conidia that are faintly dumbbell shaped with pointed ends.

== Habitat and distribution ==
Bryocaulon is chiefly a lichen genus of high latitudes and elevations, growing in the cold, open conditions that characterise arctic and alpine zones. South of the true treeline it remains frequent in moist coniferous forests, especially across eastern Asia and the coastal ranges of north-western North America. Of the four accepted species, B. divergens is by far the most wide-ranging, extending across much of the boreal and temperate Northern Hemisphere wherever suitable acidic bark or rock is available.

== Species ==
As of July 2025, Species Fungorum (in the Catalogue of Life) accept four species of Bryocaulon:

- Bryocaulon divergens (Ach.) Kärnefelt (1986) – Asia, Europe, North America
- Bryocaulon hyperboreum Øvstedal (2009) – Svalbard
- Bryocaulon pseudosatoanum (Asahina) Kärnefelt (1986)
- Bryocaulon satoanum (Gyeln.) Kärnefelt (1986)
