= Soili Stenroos =

Finnish lichenologist (born 1958)

- Born: 1958 (age 67–68); Helsinki, Finland
- Education: Bachelor of Science (1984); Master of Science (1985); Licentiate (1987); PhD (1989); Docent (1990)
- Alma mater: University of Helsinki
- Known for: Taxonomy and phylogeny of Cladonia; Finnish lichen identification guides; molecular systematics of lichenised fungi
- Awards: Professor Risto Tuomikoski Fund annual award (2001); Tieto-Finlandia (2011; as part of the Suomen jäkäläopas editorial group)
- Scientific career
- Fields: Lichenology; Mycology; Botany
- Institutions: Finnish Museum of Natural History (Luomus); University of Turku; University of Helsinki; Smithsonian Institution (postdoctoral research, 1996)
- Author abbrev. (botany): S.Stenroos

Soili Kristina Stenroos (born 1958) is a Finnish lichenologist and professor. She worked at the University of Helsinki and the University of Turku, and served as senior curator for mycology at the Finnish Museum of Natural History (Luomus) from 2009 until her retirement in 2023; she has continued research work at the Botanical Museum under contract.

== Early life and education ==
Stenroos was born in Helsinki in 1958 and completed upper secondary school in Espoo in 1977. She studied biology at the University of Helsinki, earning a Bachelor of Science degree in biology in 1984 and a Master of Science degree in botany in 1985, with minors in zoology and geology. She completed a licentiate of philosophy degree in 1987 and received a PhD in 1989 in ecology and systematic botany. In 1990 she was awarded the title of docent (habilitation).

== Career ==
At the University of Helsinki, Stenroos held research posts from 1984 to 1996, including research associate (1984–1990 and 1994–1996), acting junior research fellow (1990–1991) and junior research fellow (1991–1994). In 1996 she spent six months as a postdoctoral researcher at the Smithsonian Institution in Washington, DC. She moved to the University of Turku in 1997 as acting curator and worked there as curator and amanuensis from 1998 to 2004; from 2004 to 2009 she was an academic research fellow, while also serving as curator from 2005 to 2009. Since 2009 she has worked at the Finnish Museum of Natural History in Helsinki as Senior Curator for Mycology. In March 2023 Stenroos retired from her post as a professor, senior curator and head of Luomus's fungi and bryophyte team, but continued working at the Botanical Museum under a research contract. She had stepped down from the team-leader role the previous year when she moved to part-time retirement.

== Research ==
Stenroos's route into lichenology began with her master's thesis, which drew on a collection of mosses and lichens from the Aletschwald in Switzerland that she and her husband assembled in connection with the Man and the Biosphere Programme. Teuvo Ahti assisted with identifying the lichens and Tuomo Koponen with identifying the mosses. When Koponen later transferred to her a collection of Cladonia gathered in Papua New Guinea, she began a long-term focus on that genus, including taxonomic work on the Cladonia coccifera group and related species. As an academy fellow, Stenroos led a project that aimed to reconstruct a phylogenetic hypothesis for the fungal class Lecanoromycetes using multi-locus data, and used these results to reassess morphology-based species and genus limits in lichen-forming fungi. Stenroos established the Botanical Museum's first molecular systematics laboratory in the early 1990s, including training colleagues in DNA extraction and amplification methods.

== Awards and recognition ==
Stenroos received the annual award of the Professor Risto Tuomikoski Fund for Biological Taxonomy in 2001. In 2011 she was the editor in chief of the identification guide Suomen jäkäläopas ('Finnish lichen guide'), which won the Tieto-Finlandia (Finlandia Prize in Non-fiction). The guide treats all macrolichens known from Finland and includes a selection of common crustose lichens (481 taxa in total).

Some lichenised fungi and lichen-associated fungi have been named in Stenroos's honour, including Cladonia stenroosiae Ahti (2002); Lichenopeltella soiliae Zhur. & Pino-Bodas (2015); and Lobariella stenroosiae B.Moncada & Lücking (2013).

== Selected publications ==
- Stenroos, Soili (1989). "Taxonomic studies on Cladonia section Cocciferae, with special reference to secondary product chemistry". Publications from the Department of Botany, University of Helsinki. 13. University of Helsinki: 1–15. ISBN 951-45-5090-0.
- Stenroos, Soili; Hyvönen, Jaakko; Myllys, Leena; Thell, Arne; Ahti, Teuvo (2002). "Phylogeny of the genus Cladonia s.lat. (Cladoniaceae, ascomycetes) inferred from molecular, morphological, and chemical data". Cladistics. 18 (3): 237–278. doi:10.1111/j.1096-0031.2002.tb00151.x.
- Stenroos, Soili, ed. (1994). Focus on Lichen Taxonomy and Biogeography: A Festschrift in Honour of Teuvo Ahti. Acta Botanica Fennica. Vol. 150. Helsinki: Finnish Botanical Publishing Board. ISBN 978-951-9469-44-7.
- Stenroos, Soili; Kuusinen, Mikko; Ahti, Teuvo; Lommi, Sampsa (1999). Jäkäläkurssi. Botanical bulletins from the Herbarium, University of Turku (in Finnish). Vol. 2. Turku: Turun yliopisto, kasvimuseo (Finnish Museum of Natural History Botany Unit). ISBN 951-29-1430-1.
- Stenroos, Soili; Ahti, Teuvo; Lohtander, Katileena; Myllys, Leena (2011). Suomen jäkäläopas. Norrlinia (in Finnish). Vol. 21. Helsinki: Kasvimuseo, Luonnontieteellinen keskusmuseo. ISBN 978-952-10-6804-1.
- Stenroos, Soili; Velmala, Saara; Pykälä, Juha; Ahti, Teuvo (2015). Suomen rupijäkälät [Crustose lichens of Finland]. Norrlinia (in Finnish). Vol. 28. Helsinki: Luonnontieteellinen keskusmuseo Luomus. ISBN 978-951-51-0837-1.
- Stenroos, Soili; Velmala, Saara; Pykälä, Juha; Ahti, Teuvo (eds.). Lichens of Finland. Norrlinia. Vol. 30. ISBN 978-951-51-2266-7.

== See also ==
- Category:Taxa named by Soili Stenroos
