= Parietinic acid =

Chemical compound found in some lichens

Names
- IUPAC name 4,5-Dihydroxy-7-methoxy-9,10-dioxo-9,10-dihydro-2-anthracenecarboxylic acid
- Other names: 1,8-Dihydroxy-3-methoxy-6-carboxy-9,10-anthraquinone; 1,8-Dihydroxy-6-methoxy-9,10-dioxo-9,10-dihydroanthracene-3-carboxylic acid

Identifiers
CAS Number	17636-18-9
3D model (JSmol)	Interactive image
ChEBI	CHEBI:144288
ChemSpider	9682704
CompTox Dashboard (EPA)	DTXSID10467781
- InChI: InChI=1S/C16H10O7/c1-23-7-4-9-13(11(18)5-7)15(20)12-8(14(9)19)2-6(16(21)22)3-10(12)17/h2-5,17-18H,1H3,(H,21,22) Key: HEULMVKOOVHXME-UHFFFAOYSA-N
- SMILES: COC1=CC2=C(C(=C1)O)C(=O)C3=C(C2=O)C=C(C=C3O)C(=O)O

Properties
Chemical formula	C_{16}H_{10}O_{7}
Molar mass	314.249 g·mol^{−1}
Appearance	orange needles
Melting point	304–305 °C (579–581 °F; 577–578 K)
- Except where otherwise noted, data are given for materials in their standard state (at 25 °C [77 °F], 100 kPa). Infobox references

Parietinic acid is an organic compound in the structural class of chemicals known as anthraquinones. It is found in many species of the lichen family Teloschistaceae. The substance was first reported in the literature by the German chemist Walter Eschrich in 1958.

== Occurrence ==
Originally isolated from the lichen Xanthoria parietina, it has since been identified in many lichens of the family Teloschistaceae. In 1970, Johan Santesson proposed a possible biogenetic relationship between the anthraqunone compounds commonly found in Caloplaca. According to this scheme, emodin is methylated to give parietin, which then undergoes three successive oxidations, sequentially forming fallacinol, fallacinal, and then parietinic acid. A chemosyndrome is a set of biosynthetically related compounds produced by a lichen. In 2002, Ulrik Søchting and Patrik Frödén identified chemosyndrome A, the most common chemosyndrome in the genus Teloschistes and in the entire family Teloschistaceae, which features parietin as the main substance and smaller proportions of teloschistin, fallacinal, parietinic acid, and emodin.

== Properties ==
In its purified form, parietinic acid exists as orange needles with a melting point of 304–305 °C (579–581 °F). Its ultraviolet spectrum has two peaks of maximum absorption (λ_{max}) at 325 and 435 nm, and its infrared spectrum has two peaks at 1629 and 1700 cm^{−1}.

Parietinic acid was shown to have antifungal activity and antibacterial activity in laboratory tests.
