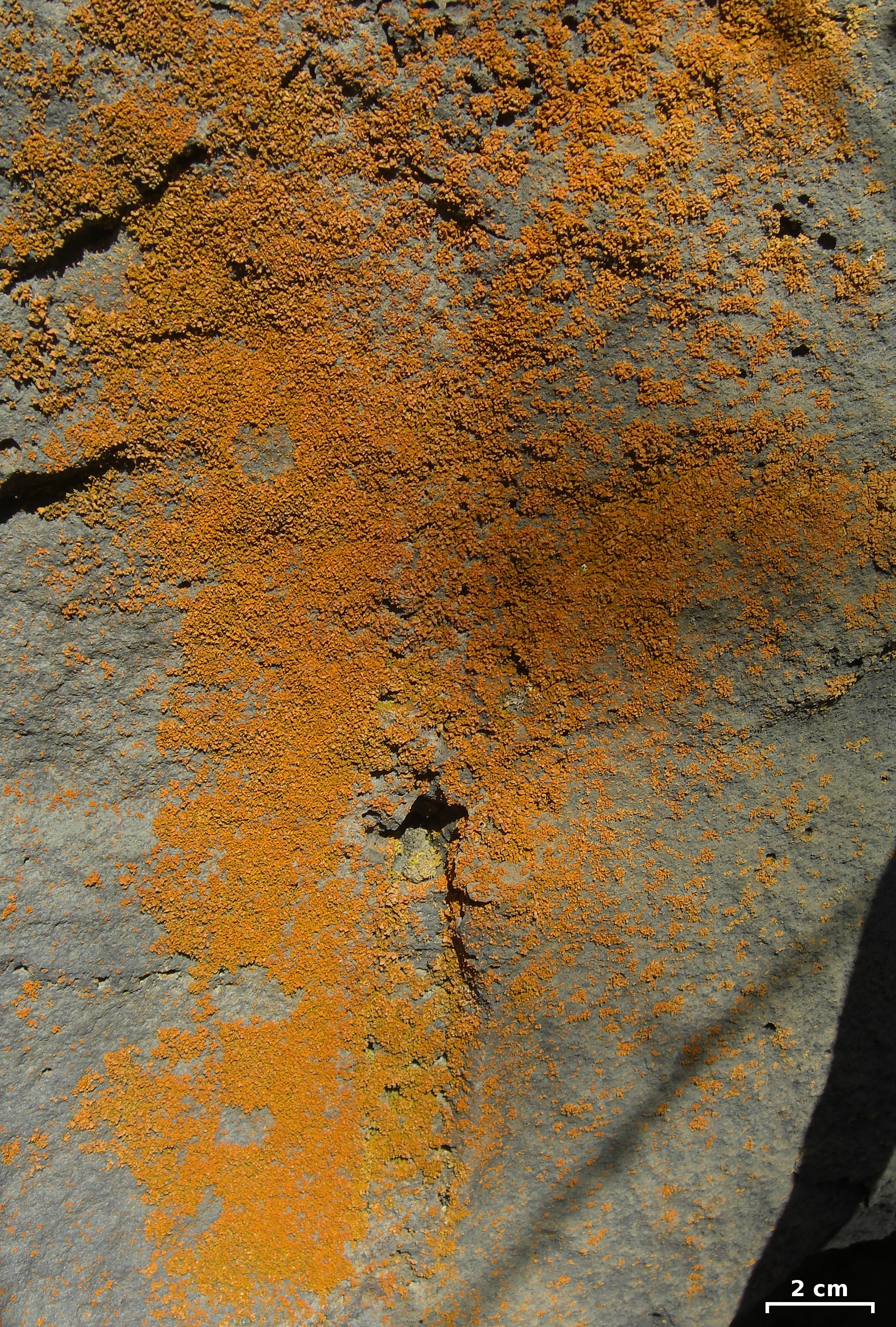
- Xanthomendoza mendozae

Scientific classification
- Domain: Eukaryota
- Kingdom: Fungi
- Division: Ascomycota
- Class: Lecanoromycetes
- Order: Teloschistales
- Family: Teloschistaceae
- Genus: Xanthomendoza; S.Y.Kondr. & Kärnefelt (1997)

Type species
- Xanthomendoza mendozae (Räsänen) S.Y.Kondr. & Kärnefelt (1997)

= Xanthomendoza =

Genus of lichens

Xanthomendoza is a genus of small, bright orange foliose lichens with lecanorine apothecia. It is in the family Teloschistaceae. Members of the genus are commonly called sunburst lichens or orange lichens because of their bright orange color.

Members of Xanthomendoza were formerly classified in the genus Xanthoria, but Xanthomendoza members have rhizenes or scattered holdfasts, while Xanthoria do not, and they have different conidia.

Lichen spot tests on the upper cortex are K+ purple, KC−, C−, and P−.

== Species ==
As of January 2024, Species Fungorum (in the Catalogue of Life) accepts nine species of Xanthomendoza:

- Xanthomendoza hermonii (S.Y.Kondr.) Frödén, Arup & Søchting (2013)
- Xanthomendoza huculica (S.Y.Kondr.) Diederich (2014)
- Xanthomendoza kashiwadanii S.Y.Kondr. & Kärnefelt (2009)
- Xanthomendoza leoncita Bungartz & Søchting (2020) – Galápagos Islands
- Xanthomendoza mendozae (Räsänen) S.Y.Kondr. & Kärnefelt (1997)
- Xanthomendoza oregana (Gyeln.) Søchting, Kärnefelt & S.Y.Kondr. (2002)
- Xanthomendoza pruinosa (Hillmann) Søchting, Kärnefelt & S.Y.Kondr. (2002)
- Xanthomendoza sogdiana S.Y.Kondr. & Kudratov (2010)
- Xanthomendoza subramulosa (Räsänen) Søchting, Kärnefelt & S.Y.Kondr. (2002)
