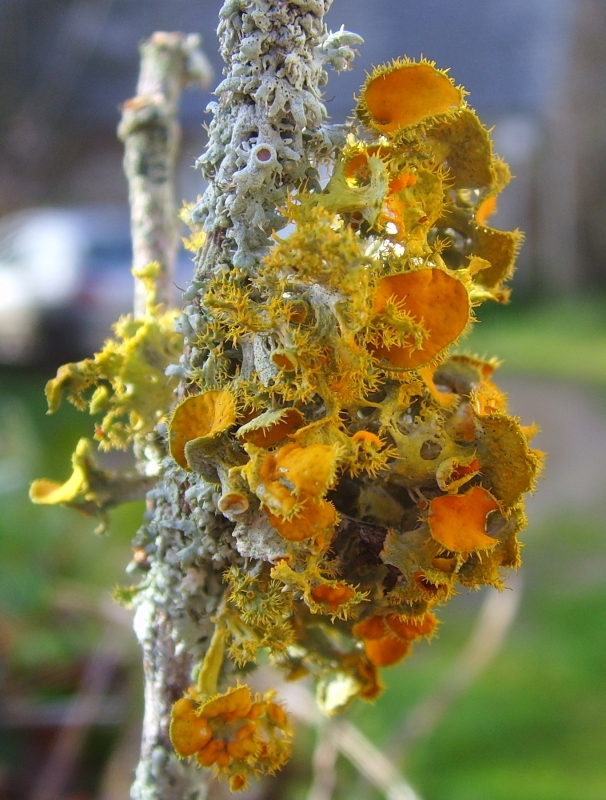
- Teloschistes chrysophthalmus

Scientific classification
- Kingdom: Fungi
- Division: Ascomycota
- Class: Lecanoromycetes
- Subclass: Lecanoromycetidae
- Order: Teloschistales; D.Hawksw. & O.E.Erikss. (1986)

Families
- Brigantiaeaceae; Letrouitiaceae; Megalosporaceae; Teloschistaceae

= Teloschistales =

Order of lichen-forming fungi

The Teloschistales are an order of mostly lichen-forming fungi belonging to the class Lecanoromycetes in the division Ascomycota. According to one 2008 estimate, the order contains 5 families, 66 genera, and 1954 species. The predominant photobiont partners for the Teloschistales are green algae from the genera Trebouxia and Asterochloris.

== Systematics ==
In a 2016 classification of lichenized fungi, the order Teloschistales was arranged into two suborders, both attributed to Gaya and Lutzoni: Letrouitineae, containing Brigantiaeaceae and Letrouitiaceae, and Teloschistineae, containing Megalosporaceae and Teloschistaceae. In broad terms, Letrouitineae represented a mainly crustose lineage, while Teloschistineae included a more morphologically varied assemblage ranging from crustose to foliose and fruticose forms, and encompassed the often brightly coloured teloschistoid lichens.

The higher-level phylogenetic relationships of the Teloschistales and other members of the two major subclasses of Lecanoromycetes, Lecanoromycetidae and Ostropomycetidae, were clarified in a 2018 publication by Kraichak and colleagues. In the Teloschistales, the family Teloschistaceae has a sister taxon relationship with Megalosporaceae, and the clade containing these two families is itself sister to a clade containing families Brigantiaeaceae and Letrouitiaceae.

- - - Teloschistaceae
      - - - - - - - - - Usnochroma
                      - Rufoplaca scotoplaca
                    - Caloplaca conversa
                  - - - Caloplaca variabilis
                      - Pyrenodesmia chalybaea
                    - - Caloplaca teicholyta
                      - Caloplaca atroflava
                - - - Variospora
                    - Seirophora
                  - - Caloplaca isidiigera
                    - Caloplaca chlorina
              - - Gyalolechia
                - Caloplaca cinnamomea
            - - - - - Xanthoria aureola
                    - Xanthoria parietina
                  - Xanthoria calcicola
                - - - Caloplaca granulosa
                    - Caloplaca polycarpa
                  - Polycauliona impolita
              - Xanthopeltis rupicola
          - - - - Xanthomendoza poeltii
                - Xanthomendoza oregana
              - Xanthomendoza weberi
            - - Xanthomendoza trachyphylla
              - Xanthomendoza fallax
      - - - - - - - Teloschistes exilis
                  - Teloschistes flavicans
                - - Niorma chrysophthalma
                  - Teloschistes hosseusianus
              - Solitaria chrysophthalma
            - Wetmoreana decipioides
          - - Stellarangia elegantissima
            - Sirenophila eos
        - Caloplaca chilensis
    - Megalosporaceae
      - - Megalospora
        - - Austroblastenia
          - Megaloblastenia marginiflexa
      - Sipmaniella sulphureofusca
  - - Brigantiaeaceae
      - Letrouitia
      - Brigantiaea

Cladogram showing the phylogeny of some species in representative genera in family Teloschistaceae and in the order Teloschistales; based on Kraichak et al.'s 2018 revised classification of orders and families in Lecanoromycetes (simplified from original).

== Description ==
Members of the Teloschistales are mostly lichen-forming fungi, only rarely lichenicolous, that usually associate with chlorococcoid green algae as their photobionts. Across the order, the thallus ranges from crustose to squamulose, foliose, or fruticose, although crustose forms are common. Many members, especially in the Teloschistaceae, are yellow, orange, or red-orange, while others have fruiting bodies that are yellow-orange to purple-brown.

The fruiting bodies are typically apothecia, and the microscopic structures of the order are varied but broadly similar across its major lineages. The asci are usually club-shaped, and the ascospores are colourless and range from transversely septate to muriform (multi-chambered), with between one and eight spores per ascus in some groups and commonly eight in others. Secondary chemistry is variable, but commonly includes anthraquinones, atranorin, pannarin, usnic acid, and zeorin. Species occur mainly on bark and rock, with bark-dwelling forms especially characteristic of Letrouitineae.

== Habitat and distribution ==
Species of Teloschistales occur in both maritime and inland settings, and their local diversity can be strongly structured by habitat. On the Commander Islands (Russian Far East), an inventory combining plot-based collecting with molecular identifications recorded 36 species across coastal, tundra and floodplain habitats, with the highest richness in coastal sites and generally poorer plots in tundra. In the same study, arctic-alpine circumpolar taxa predominated in tundra plots, while floodplains supported mainly corticolous and lignicolous species and included circumboreal and amphi-Pacific elements. The archipelago's Teloschistales funga also included taxa otherwise associated with maritime north-east Asia and the western coast of North America alongside more widely distributed boreal and circumpolar species; the authors suggested that island chains such as the Aleutian Islands can act as stepping stones for dispersal between the two continents, and they reported several taxa that may be restricted to the Commander Islands.

== Families ==
- Brigantiaeaceae Hafellner & Bellem. (1982)
- Letrouitiaceae Hafellner & Bellem. (1982)
- Megalosporaceae Vězda ex Hafellner & Bellem. (1982)
- Teloschistaceae Zahlbr. (1898)
