= Sergey Kondratyuk =

Ukrainian lichenologist

Sergey Yakovlevich Kondratyuk
- Born: 17 May 1959 (age 67); Kirovohrad
- Education: Kyiv State University
- Scientific career
- Fields: Lichenology
- Workplaces: M.G. Kholodny Institute of Botany of National Academy of Sciences of Ukraine
- Author abbrev. (botany): S.Y.Kondr.

Sergey Yakovlevich Kondratyuk (Ukrainian: Сергій Якович Кондратюк) (born 17 May 1959) is a Ukrainian botanist specialising in lichenology. His research deals with the taxonomy, floristics, ecology and geography of lichens and lichenicolous fungi. He has worked at the M.G. Kholodny Institute of Botany of National Academy of Sciences of Ukraine for more than 40 years. In 2014 Kondratyuk was awarded the State Prize of Ukraine in Science and Technology.

== Early life and education ==
Kondratyuk was born in the Kirovohrad region, in Ulyanovsk. After graduating from school in 1976 he became a student of the Faculty of Biology at Kyiv State University. He specialized in the Department of Lower Plants. While still a student, Kondratyuk started to study lichens under the guidance of O.B. Bloom. Then began his career at the Institute of Botany (1979), as a senior technician and later an engineer in the Department of Algology and Lichenology. He continued his career as a graduate student of the institute (1981–1984). After successfully defending his dissertation entitled "Lichens of the Dnieper Upland" (1985), Kondratyuk continued to work at the institute, having passed the path from junior to leading researcher, head of the laboratory and department, scientific secretary, deputy director and finally acting director of the institute. In 1996 Kondratyuk defended his doctoral dissertation "Lichen flora of the plains of Ukraine and its analysis"; in 2006 he received the title of Professor.

== Research ==
Since 1995, Kondratyuk has been working for many years with Professor Ingvar Kärnefelt from the Botanical Museum of Lund University (Sweden) to study lichens of the family Teloschistaceae. Many new genera have been circumscribed as a result, including Xanthomendoza, Josefpoeltia, Oxneria, and Rusavskia. Extensive collaborations with South Korean scientists have also resulted in the description of many taxa previously unknown to science. As of 2019, Kondratyuk has been the author or co-author of more than 400 scientific publications. Some well-known publications include "Flora of lichens of Ukraine. Volume 2. Issue 2." (1993), "The second Checklist of Lichen forming, Lichenicolous and Allied fungi of Ukraine" (1998), "A Catalog of the Eastern Carpathian Lichens" (2003), "Checklist of Lichens of the Western Carpathians" (2004), " Determinant of lichens of Russia. Issue 9" (2004), "Lichen-Forming, Lichenicolous and Allied Fungi of Israel"(2005), "Lichenoindication (Manual)" (2006), "Indication of the state of the environment of Ukraine with the help of lichens" (2008).

The fungus Epibryon kondratyukii Khodos. & Darmostuk, discovered in southern Ukraine, was named in his honour in 2019.

== See also ==
- Category:Taxa named by Sergey Kondratyuk
