= Ingvar Kärnefelt =

Swedish lichenologist

- Born: 1944 (age 81–82); Gothenburg, Sweden
- Education: University of Gothenburg; Lund University
- Scientific career
- Fields: Lichenology
- Workplaces: Lund University
- Author abbrev. (botany): Kärnefelt

Jan Eric Ingvar Kärnefelt (born 1944) is a Swedish lichenologist. Educated at the University of Gothenburg and Lund University, he is known for monographic work on Cetraria and related parmelioid genera and for organising the 1992 International Association for Lichenology (IAL) meeting in southern Sweden. He later directed the biological museums at Lund and retired in 2011. He also helped build national biodiversity infrastructure and led work documenting threatened lichens in southern Sweden.

== Early life and education ==
Kärnefelt was born in Gothenburg, Sweden in 1944. Kärnefelt grew up in western Gothenburg in the 1950s in a shipyard district and spent summers on an island off the city, where an early interest in plants took root. Using an old flora he identified sea-lungwort (Mertensia maritima), and coastal rocks covered by yellow Caloplaca and Xanthoria, together with Iceland moss lichens on dry meadows, sparked the fascination with Cetraria that later shaped his career. He attended the Djurgårdsgatan primary school from 1951 and then the Östra Real secondary school near Stampen; he matriculated in 1965 after gymnasium. His initial goal in his higher-level studies at University of Cologne in 1966–1967 was to become a dentist. He changed courses in 1968, turning instead to biology at the University of Gothenburg in 1968. Gunnar Degelius, his first teacher during undergraduate studies in botany in 1968, inspired him and others. After Degelius' retirement in 1969, Ingvar continued his studies at Lund University, where Hans Runemark held a position in systematic botany. In 1971 he met Ove Almborn, who became his supervisor. He moved to Lund for systematic botany and commenced postgraduate study in 1973. In 1979, he defended his thesis titled "The brown fruticose species of Cetraria". The thesis was later awarded a prize for the best doctoral dissertation in botany at Lund University over a 5-year period by the Royal Physiographic Society in Lund.

== Career ==
Kärnefelt became associate professor at the Department of Systematic Botany at Lund University. He built a research school in lichen systematics and supervised nine doctoral students, fostering international networks with colleagues in Estonia, Ukraine and elsewhere.

Kärnefelt's research interests include the Parmeliaceae and the Teloschistaceae, both families in which he described several taxa new to science. In 1987 he started a project regarding the status of threatened lichens in southern Sweden. This project, which was extended until 1995, provided funding for his PhD students and resulted in the publication of a highly cited book in 1997. He was appointed director of the Botanical Museum in 1984. Following a faculty reorganisation he was asked to head the combined biological museums at Lund; he served as museum director for roughly nine years and coordinated major grants that digitised and rehoused collections, culminating in a full move to Archive Centre South before his retirement in 2011. In the 1990s he drew the Swedish Species Information Centre (Swedish Species Information Centre) into national discussions on biodiversity infrastructure in the wake of the Rio process, helping secure sustained state support for biological collections.

Early in his career he undertook extensive fieldwork across North America—from the Seward Peninsula and St Lawrence Island to the Mackenzie River Delta, Great Slave Lake, Churchill and Rankin Inlet—culminating in discovery of material later described as Cetraria arenaria during work with Mason Hale in Virginia; study visits with William and Chicita Culberson at Duke University followed. He participated in the Ymer-80 Arctic expedition to Svalbard, documenting tundra vegetation during the brief flowering season and encountering numerous polar bears. His southern African work began in 1984 and included an IAL excursion in 1986 through Namibia's lichen deserts, where he noted teloschistoid diversity and recorded a distinctive Caloplaca later named C. namibensis. These field programmes underpinned his monographs on brown fruticose Cetraria (1979) and on Bryocaulon, Coelocaulon and Cornicularia (1986).

Kärnefelt was the president of the International Association for Lichenology from 1992 to 1996, and later elected Honorary President of this association for life. He organised the IAL2 symposium in the Båstad–Hemmeslöv area in 1992, deliberately keeping costs low by avoiding larger cities. At that meeting the Acharius Medals were awarded for the first time and the Mason E. Hale Award for the best thesis, an award he proposed, was instituted. As president he also helped coordinate subsequent international meetings in Yokohama (1993) and Vancouver (1994) and joined associated field excursions. In the period 1997–2005 he was the editor-in-chief for the journal of the Nordic Lichen Society, Graphis Scripta, and has been on the editorial board of the Nordic Journal of Botany since 2001.

Beyond academia, from 1996 he has guided botanical walks for Swedish tour operator STS Alpresor in the Gastein Valley (Austria), typically several weeks each summer for over two decades, combining plant identification with local cultural history.

== Recognition ==
Kärnefelt had an entire issue of The Lichenologist (volume 41, issue 5, 2009) dedicated to him, with articles written by former students. In 2025, the scientific journal Acta Botanica Hungarica devoted a special volume to mark Kärnefelt's 80th birthday. The festschrift was structured to mirror his shifting interests: from lichens, through the history of science, to vascular plants.

He is a member of Royal Physiographic Society in Lund.

=== Eponymy ===
Four genera and several species have been named to honour Kärnefelt. These include: Ikaeria S.Y.Kondr., Upreti & Hur (2017); Ingvariella Guderley & Lumbsch (1997); Kaernefeltia A.Thell & Goward (1996); Kaernefia S.Y.Kondr., Elix, A.Thell & Hur (2013); Caloplaca kaernefeltii S.Y.Kondr., Elix & A.Thell (2009), Catapyrenium kaernefeltii Breuss (1993); Hypotrachyna kaernefeltii Divakar, A.Crespo, Sipman, Elix & Lumbsch (2013); Polycoccum kaernefeltii S.Y.Kondr. (2008); Placomaronea kaernefeltii M.Westb., Frödén & Wedin (2009); Xanthoria kaernefeltii S.Y.Kondr., D.J.Galloway & Goward (2010); and Rufoplaca kaernefeltiana S.Y.Kondr., Lőkös & Hur (2017).

== Personal ==
He married Elna; their children are Karin (born 1979), Kerstin (born 1981) and Ola (born 1987). After divorcing in the late 1990s he partnered with Cecilia, a music teacher who became professor at the Royal College of Music, Stockholm in 2006.

== Selected publications ==
Kärnefelt has published nearly 300 publications, including scientific publications, popular publications, reviews, biographies and newspaper articles. He is also the author or co-author of about 40 genera and 160 species.

=== Journals ===
- Kärnefelt, Ingvar (1979). "The brown fruticose species of Cetraria". Opera Botanica. 46: 1–150.
- Kärnefelt, Ingvar (1986). "The genera Bryocaulon, Coelocaulon and Cornicularia and formerly associated taxa". Opera Botanica. 86: 1–90.
- Kärnefelt, Ingvar (1989). "Morphology and phylogeny in the Teloschistales". Cryptogamic Botany. 1: 147–203.
- Kärnefelt, Ingvar; Mattsson, Jan-Eric; Thell, Arne (1992). "Evolution and phylogeny of cetrarioid lichens". Plant Systematics and Evolution. 183 (1/2): 113–160. Bibcode:1992PSyEv.183..113K. doi:10.1007/BF00937739. JSTOR 23674894.
- Wang, T.; Bengtsson, G.; Kärnefelt, Ingvar; Björn, L.O. (2001). "Provitamins and vitamins D_{2} and D_{3} in Cladina spp. over a latitudinal gradient: possible correlation with UV levels". Journal of Photochemistry and Photobiology B: Biology. 62 (1–2): 118–122. doi:10.1016/s1011-1344(01)00160-9. PMID 11693362.
- Thell, Arne; Feuerer, T.; Kärnefelt, Ingvar; Myllys, L.; Stenroos, S. (2004). "Monophyletic groups within the Parmeliaceae identified by ITS rDNA, betatubulin and GAPDH sequences". Mycological Progress. 3 (4): 297–314. Bibcode:2004MycPr...3..297T. doi:10.1007/s11557-006-0100-1.
- Thell, Arne; Westberg, Martin; Kärnefelt, Ingvar (2004). "Biogeography of the lichen family Parmeliaceae in the Nordic countries with taxonomic remarks". Symbolae Botanicae Upsalienses. 34: 429–452.
- Kärnefelt, Ingvar; Thell, Arne (2007). "Erik Acharius and his times". In Kärnefelt, Ingvar; Thell, Arne (eds.). Lichenological Contributions in Honour of David Galloway. Bibliotheca Lichenologica. Vol. 95. Berlin & Stuttgart: J. Cramer. pp. 63–74.
- Kärnefelt, Ingvar; Thell, Arne (2007). "International Association for Lichenology: the early years". In Kärnefelt, Ingvar; Thell, Arne (eds.). Lichenological Contributions in Honour of David Galloway. Bibliotheca Lichenologica. Vol. 95. Berlin & Stuttgart: J. Cramer. pp. 75–100.
- Kondratyuk, S.Y.; Kärnefelt, Ingvar; Elix, J.A.; Thell, Arne (2009). "Contributions to the Teloschistaceae with particular reference to the Southern Hemisphere". In Thell, Arne; Seaward, M.R.D.; Feuerer, T. (eds.). Diversity of Lichenology – anniversary volume. Bibliotheca Lichenologica. Vol. 100. Berlin & Stuttgart: J. Cramer. pp. 211–290.
- Kärnefelt, Ingvar (2009). "Fifty influential lichenologists". In Thell, Arne; Seaward, M.R.D.; Feuerer, T. (eds.). Diversity of Lichenology – anniversary volume. Bibliotheca Lichenologica. Vol. 100. Berlin & Stuttgart: J. Cramer. pp. 291–380.
- Kärnefelt, Ingvar (2009). "Charles Darwin – äventyr, dramatik, framgång, liv och död" [Charles Darwin – adventure, drama, success, life and death]. Fauna & Flora (in Swedish). 104: 2–14.
- Kärnefelt, Ingvar; Scholz, Peter; Seaward, M.R.D.; Thell, Arne (2012). "Lichenology in Germany: past, present and future". Schlechtendalia. 23: 1–90.
- Thell, Arne; Crespo, A.; Divakar, P.K.; Kärnefelt, Ingvar; Leavitt, S.D.; Lumbsch, H.T.; Seaward, M.R.D. (2012). "A review of the lichen family Parmeliaceae – history, phylogeny and current taxonomy". Nordic Journal of Botany. 30 (6): 641–664. Bibcode:2012NorJB..30..641T. doi:10.1111/j.1756-1051.2012.00008.x.
- Kondratyuk, S.Y.; Tuija, A.; Kärnefelt, Ingvar; Thell, Arne (2023). "Lichenicolous fungi of southern Scandinavia with particular reference to those associated with Xanthoria calcicola s. lat". Folia Cryptogamica Estonica. 60: 129–136. doi:10.12697/fce.2023.60.12.

=== Books ===
- Kärnefelt, Ingvar; Thell, Arne, eds. (2007). Lichenological Contributions in Honour of David Galloway. Bibliotheca Lichenologica. Vol. 95. Berlin & Stuttgart: J. Cramer / Gebrüder Borntraeger. pp. 1–603.
- Hafellner, Josef; Kärnefelt, Ingvar; Wirth, Volker, eds. (2010). Diversity and ecology of lichens in polar and mountain ecosystems. Bibliotheca Lichenologica. Vol. 104. Stuttgart: J. Cramer / Gebrüder Borntraeger. pp. 1–389.
- Kärnefelt, Ingvar; Seaward, M.R.D.; Thell, Arne (2012). Systematics, biodiversity and ecology of lichens. Bibliotheca Lichenologica. Vol. 108. Berlin & Stuttgart: J. Cramer. p. 290.
- Björn, L O., Shevela, D. & Kärnefelt, I. 2020. Växtvärldens uppkomst och utveckling. Lunds Botaniska Förening, Mixi Print, Olofström, 196 sidor.
- Kärnefelt, I., Shevela, D. & Björn, L O. 2026. The Origin and Evolution of the Plant World. Koeltz Botanical Books, illus, 285 p.

== See also ==
- Category:Taxa named by Ingvar Kärnefelt
