= List of Dufourea species =

This is a list of 167 species in the genus Dufourea.

== Dufourea species ==
- Dufourea afasciata Bohart, 1948
- Dufourea akmolensis Pesenko, 1998
- Dufourea alpina Morawitz, 1865
- Dufourea arkeuthos Ebmer, 2004
- Dufourea armata Popov, 1959
- Dufourea armenia Ebmer, 1987
- Dufourea atlantica Ebmer, 1993
- Dufourea atrata (Warncke, 1979)
- Dufourea australis (Michener, 1937)
- Dufourea bernardina (Michener, 1937)
- Dufourea bifida Bohart, 1980
- Dufourea boharti Hurd & Moure, 1987
- Dufourea boregoensis (Michener, 1937)
- Dufourea brachycephala (Warncke, 1979)
- Dufourea brevicornis Timberlake, 1939
- Dufourea bucharica Ebmer, 2008
- Dufourea bytinskii Ebmer, 1999
- Dufourea caelestis Ebmer, 1987
- Dufourea calcarata (Morawitz, 1886)
- Dufourea calientensis Timberlake, 1939
- Dufourea californica (Michener, 1935)
- Dufourea calochorti (Cockerell, 1924)
- Dufourea campanulae (Cockerell, 1897)
- Dufourea carbopila (Wu, 1986)
- Dufourea carinata (Popov, 1959)
- Dufourea chagrina (Warncke, 1979)
- Dufourea chlora Wu, 1990
- Dufourea ciliata Ebmer, 1993
- Dufourea clavicra (Morawitz, 1889)
- Dufourea clypeata (Wu, 1983)
- Dufourea coeruleocephala Morawitz, 1872
- Dufourea contarovici Bohart, 1980
- Dufourea convergens Bohart, 1949
- Dufourea crassipes (Cockerell, 1924)
- Dufourea cuprea Bohart, 1948
- Dufourea cupreoviridis Bohart, 1980
- Dufourea cyanella Bohart, 1980
- Dufourea cypria Mavromoustakis, 1952
- Dufourea davidsoni (Cockerell, 1902)
- Dufourea dentipes Bohart, 1948
- Dufourea dentiventris (Nylander, 1848)
- Dufourea descansana Cockerell, 1941
- Dufourea deserticola (Popov, 1957)
- Dufourea desertorides Ebmer, 1978
- Dufourea desertorum Timberlake, 1939
- Dufourea dilatipes Bohart, 1948
- Dufourea dysis Ebmer, 1993
- Dufourea echinocacti Timberlake, 1939 (barrel cactus dufourea)
- Dufourea eremica Ebmer, 1976
- Dufourea exigua Ebmer, 2008
- Dufourea exulans Ebmer, 1984
- Dufourea fallugiae (Cockerell, 1906)
- Dufourea femorata Bohart, 1947
- Dufourea fimbriata (Cresson, 1878)
- Dufourea flavozonata (Wu, 1990)
- Dufourea fortunata Ebmer, 1993
- Dufourea gaullei Vachal, 1897
- Dufourea gilia Bohart, 1947
- Dufourea gkuruensis (Warncke, 1979)
- Dufourea glaboabdominalis (Wu, 1986)
- Dufourea goeleti Ebmer, 1999
- Dufourea graeca Ebmer, 1976
- Dufourea halictula (Nylander, 1852)
- Dufourea holocyanea (Cockerell, 1925)
- Dufourea impunctata Bohart, 1949
- Dufourea inermis (Nylander, 1848)
- Dufourea iris Ebmer, 1987
- Dufourea josefi Ebmer, 1993
- Dufourea juniperi Ebmer, 2004
- Dufourea kashmirensis (Warncke, 1979)
- Dufourea kerzhneri (Pesenko & Astafurova, 2006)
- Dufourea ladakhensis (Warncke, 1979)
- Dufourea latifemurinis (Wu, 1982)
- Dufourea latifrons Timberlake, 1939
- Dufourea leachi Timberlake, 1939
- Dufourea lijiangensis Wu, 1990
- Dufourea linanthi Timberlake, 1939
- Dufourea longiceps Bohart, 1948
- Dufourea longicornis (Warncke, 1979)
- Dufourea longicornis (Wu, 1982)
- Dufourea longiglossa Ebmer, 1993
- Dufourea longispinis (Wu, 1987)
- Dufourea lusitanica Ebmer, 1999
- Dufourea macswaini Bohart, 1969
- Dufourea malacothricis Timberlake, 1939
- Dufourea mandibularis (Popov, 1959)
- Dufourea marginata (Cresson, 1878)
- Dufourea maroccana (Warncke, 1979)
- Dufourea maura (Cresson, 1878)
- Dufourea megamandibularis (Wu, 1983)
- Dufourea merceti Vachal, 1907
- Dufourea metallica Morawitz, 1890
- Dufourea minuta Lepeletier, 1841
- Dufourea minutissima Ebmer, 1976
- Dufourea moldenkei Bohart, 1980
- Dufourea monardae (Viereck, 1924) (monarda dufourea)
- Dufourea mongolica (Popov, 1959)
- Dufourea montana (Popov, 1957)
- Dufourea mulleri (Cockerell, 1898)
- Dufourea muoti Vachal, 1899
- Dufourea nemophilae (Michener, 1937)
- Dufourea neocalifornica Bohart, 1947
- Dufourea neoscintilla Bohart, 1980
- Dufourea neovernalis Bohart, 1980
- Dufourea nigrohirta (Warncke, 1979)
- Dufourea nodicornis (Warncke, 1979)
- Dufourea novaeangliae (Robertson, 1897)
- Dufourea nudicornis Timberlake, 1939
- Dufourea oenotherae Timberlake, 1939
- Dufourea orovada Bohart, 1980
- Dufourea oryx (Viereck, 1903)
- Dufourea paradoxa (Morawitz, 1867)
- Dufourea pectinipes Bohart, 1948
- Dufourea petraea Ebmer, 1999
- Dufourea phoenix Ebmer, 2008
- Dufourea pilotibialis (Wu, 1987)
- Dufourea pontica (Warncke, 1979)
- Dufourea pseudometallica Wu, 1990
- Dufourea pulchricornis (Cockerell, 1916)
- Dufourea punica Ebmer, 1976
- Dufourea quadridentata (Warncke, 1979)
- Dufourea rhamni (Michener, 1937)
- Dufourea rufiventris Friese, 1898
- Dufourea salviae Ebmer, 2008
- Dufourea sandhouseae (Michener, 1937)
- Dufourea saundersi (Cockerell, 1898)
- Dufourea scabricornis Bohart, 1949
- Dufourea schmiedeknechtii (Kohl, 1905)
- Dufourea scintilla (Cockerell, 1916)
- Dufourea similis Friese, 1898
- Dufourea sinensis (Wu, 1982)
- Dufourea snellingi Bohart, 1980
- Dufourea sparsipunctata Bohart, 1980
- Dufourea spilura (Cockerell, 1925)
- Dufourea spinifera (Viereck, 1904)
- Dufourea spiniventris (Popov, 1959)
- Dufourea stagei Bohart, 1980
- Dufourea styx Ebmer, 1976
- Dufourea subclavicra (Wu, 1982)
- Dufourea subdavidsoni Bohart, 1949
- Dufourea tarsata Bohart, 1947
- Dufourea tibetensis Wu, 1990
- Dufourea timberlakei Bohart, 1947
- Dufourea tingitana Ebmer, 1999
- Dufourea tinsleyi (Cockerell, 1898)
- Dufourea torchioi Bohart, 1980
- Dufourea trautmanni Dusmet y Alonso, 1935
- Dufourea tridentata (Wu, 1987)
- Dufourea trigonellae Ebmer, 1999
- Dufourea trochantera Bohart, 1948
- Dufourea truncata Timberlake, 1939
- Dufourea tularensis Timberlake, 1941
- Dufourea tuolumne Bohart, 1947
- Dufourea turkmenorum Pesenko, 1998
- Dufourea ulkenkalkana Patiny, 2003
- Dufourea vanduzeei Bohart, 1947
- Dufourea vandykei Bohart, 1948
- Dufourea vernalis Timberlake, 1939
- Dufourea versatilis (Bridwell, 1919)
- Dufourea versicolor Alfken, 1936
- Dufourea virgata (Cockerell, 1898)
- Dufourea viridescens (Crawford, 1916)
- Dufourea viridis Timberlake, 1941
- Dufourea wolfi Ebmer, 1989
- Dufourea xinjiangensis (Wu, 1985)
- Dufourea yunnanensis Wu, 1990
- Dufourea zacatecas Bohart, 1980
