= Rusavskia drevlyanica =

Scientific classification
- Kingdom: Fungi
- Division: Ascomycota
- Class: Lecanoromycetes
- Order: Teloschistales
- Family: Teloschistaceae
- Genus: Rusavskia
- Species: R. drevlyanica

Binomial name
- Rusavskia drevlyanica S.Y.Kondr. & O.O.Orlov (2020)
- Holotype site: Drevlians Nature Reserve, Ukraine

Species of lichen

Rusavskia drevlyanica is a species of saxicolous (rock-dwelling) lichen in the family Teloschistaceae. Described as a new species in 2020, it is found in the East European forest steppe of Ukraine.

== Taxonomy ==
The lichen was formally described as a new species in 2020 by the lichenologists Sergey Kondratyuk and Oleksandr Orlov. The species epithet drevlyanica alludes to its prevalent location, the Drevlyansky Nature Reserve in Ukraine. The type specimen was collected in the vicinity of the Hannivka village (Zhytomyr Oblast), specifically on the roof of an old sheepfold building. It was found growing along with various other lichen species. Orlov collected the type specimen in October 2018.

Earlier taxonomic records had grouped Rusavskia drevlyanica under Rusavskia elegans. The former's distinct morphological features and habitat preferences, however, warranted its classification as a separate species.

== Description ==
The thallus of Rusavskia drevlyanica generally spans 2–3 cm (0.8–1.2 in), occasionally reaching larger diameters up to 3 cm. It takes on a rosette-like shape with prominently visible thalline lobes that measure 5–8 mm in length. These lobes are 0.3–0.5 mm wide along their entire length, appearing to be flat when viewed from the top. A cross-sectional view, however, reveals some concavity and undulations on the underside of the lobes. These lobes initially appear narrow and flat, gradually growing distant from each other to form a net-like thallus. As they mature, the lobes become shorter and wider, with their edges bending downwards. The upper surface of the thallus may appear to have pseudocyphellate characteristics, and its underside is white.

In terms of structure, when sectioned, the thallus is observed to be 125–150 μm thick. The upper cortical layer ranges from very thin at 15–20 μm to quite thick, reaching up to 125 μm. The algal layer within the thallus, which is separated by hyphae of the cortex, is about 50 μm thick. This zone contains green algal cells with a diameter of approximately 10–12 μm. The medulla, located below the algal layer, is often densely packed and ranges from 50 to 70 μm in thickness. The lower cortex is about 15–20 μm thick and has a palisade or paraplectenchymatous structure. There are no rhizines or attachment organs present in this species.

Rusavskia drevlyanica bears apothecia that range from 0.3–1 mm in diameter and 0.3–0.4 mm in thickness. These apothecia have a flat disc and are distinctly attenuated at their base, often resembling a button or a lamp in shape. The discs rise slightly above the level of the thallus. When numerous, these apothecia can significantly affect the thallus's appearance. The disc and its surrounding margins are of the same colour, a form known as zeorine. The apothecia's own margin is thin but clearly visible, while the thalline margin often displays a crenulate pattern. The ascospores vary in shape, from almost spherical to widely ellipsoid, depending on their maturity.

=== Similar species ===
Rusavskia drevlyanica shares similarities with both Rusavskia elegans and Zeroviella esfahanensis. It differs in several ways, such as the size and thickness of the thallus, the width of the lobes, and the diameter of the apothecia. While similar in some aspects to Zeroviella esfahanensis, the two differ in terms of thalline lobe dimensions, apothecia size, and distribution.

== Habitat and distribution ==
This lichen species is known to grow on calcium-containing materials, particularly roof tiles. Its primary habitat is the East European forest steppe of Ukraine, especially abundant in the Drevlians Nature Reserve. The authors suggest that its presence may extend to other parts of Eastern Europe.
