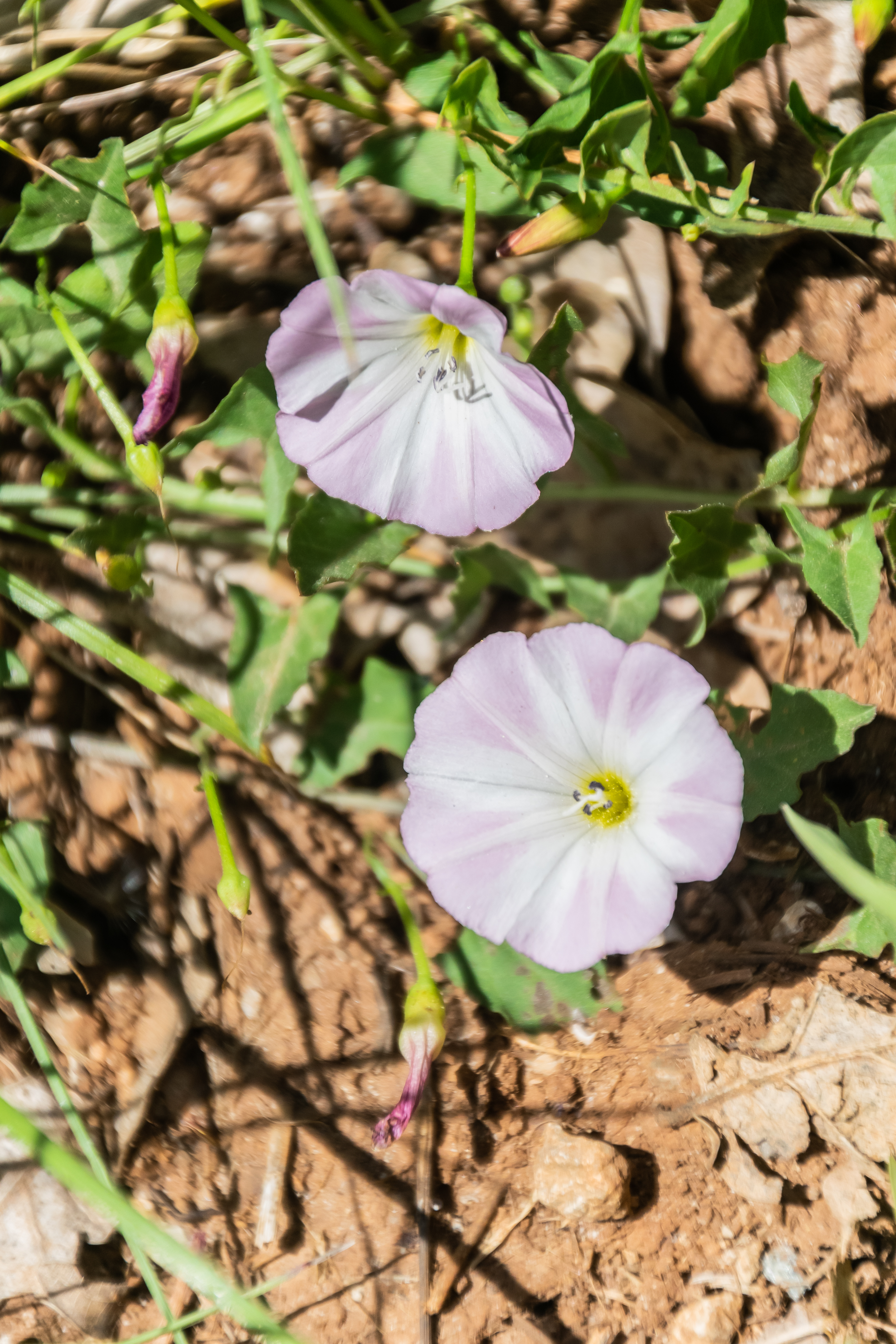
- Convolvulus arvensis in Aveyron, France

Scientific classification
- Kingdom: Plantae
- Clade: Tracheophytes
- Clade: Angiosperms
- Clade: Eudicots
- Clade: Asterids
- Order: Solanales
- Family: Convolvulaceae
- Genus: Convolvulus
- Species: C. arvensis

Binomial name
- Convolvulus arvensis L.

= Convolvulus arvensis =

Species of bindweed

Convolvulus arvensis, or field bindweed, is a species of bindweed in the Convolvulaceae native to Europe and Asia. It is a rhizomatous and climbing or creeping herbaceous perennial plant with stems growing to 0.5–2 metres (1.6–6.6 ft) in length. It is usually found at ground level with small white and pink flowers.

Other common names, mostly obsolete, include lesser bindweed, European bindweed, withy wind (in basket willow crops), perennial morning glory, small-flowered morning glory, creeping Jenny, and possession vine.

== Taxonomy ==
Field bindweed was first described in 1753 by Carl Linnaeus in the Species Plantarum. In the following centuries, many subspecies, varieties, and synonymous taxa were discovered and described as purportedly new species in places including China, Russia, Egypt, and Morocco. New species and forms were described as far as Chile, Mexico, and the state of California when botanists encountered the plant there, although it is not native to these areas.

In the ninth volume of Augustin Pyramus de Candolle's Prodromus, published in 1845, Jacques Denys Choisy reduced a number of these synonyms to ten varieties of Convolvulus arvensis, although he also recognised a number of species now also reduced to synonyms of C. arvensis. Over time, most or all of these species and varieties were no longer recognised by the relevant authorities.

In the Flora of Great Britain and Ireland (2009), Peter Derek Sell described nine new forms he believed he had discovered in Cambridgeshire, along Fen Road in the village of Bassingbourn cum Kneesworth. The forms discovered in Bassingbourn cum Kneesworth were deemed not credible by subsequent taxonomic authorities, however, and the species is currently considered to be monotypic by most authorities.

== Description ==
Convolvulus arvensis is a perennial vine that typically climbs to 1 metre (3.3 ft). The vine produces woody rhizomes from which it resprouts in the spring, or when the aboveground vines are removed.

The leaves are spirally arranged, linear to arrowhead-shaped, 2–5 cm (0.79–1.97 in) long and alternate, with a 1–3 cm (0.39–1.18 in) petiole. The flowers are trumpet-shaped, 1–2.5 cm (0.39–0.98 in) diameter, white or pale pink, with five slightly darker pink radial stripes. Flowering occurs in mid summer (in the UK, between June and September) when white to pale pink, funnel-shaped flowers develop. Flowers are approximately 1.9–2.5 cm (0.75–0.98 in) across and are subtended by small bracts. The fruit are light brown, rounded and 3–4 mm (0.12–0.16 in) wide. Each fruit contains 2 or 4 seeds that are eaten by birds and can remain viable in the soil for decades. The stems climb by twisting around other plant stems in a counter-clockwise direction.

Close-up of white flower

Leaves

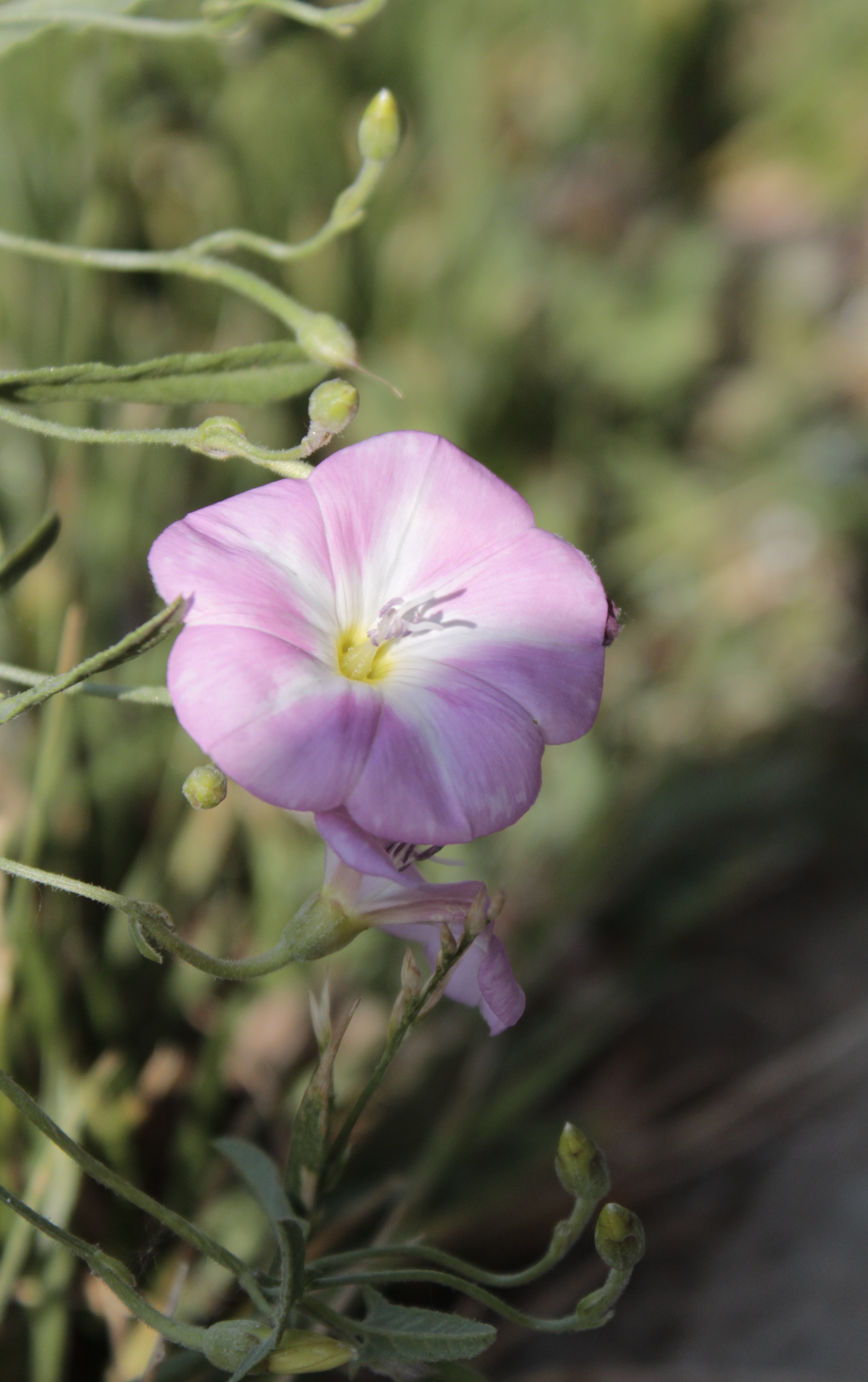
Pink Convolvulus arvensis, Zaamin National Park, Uzbekistan

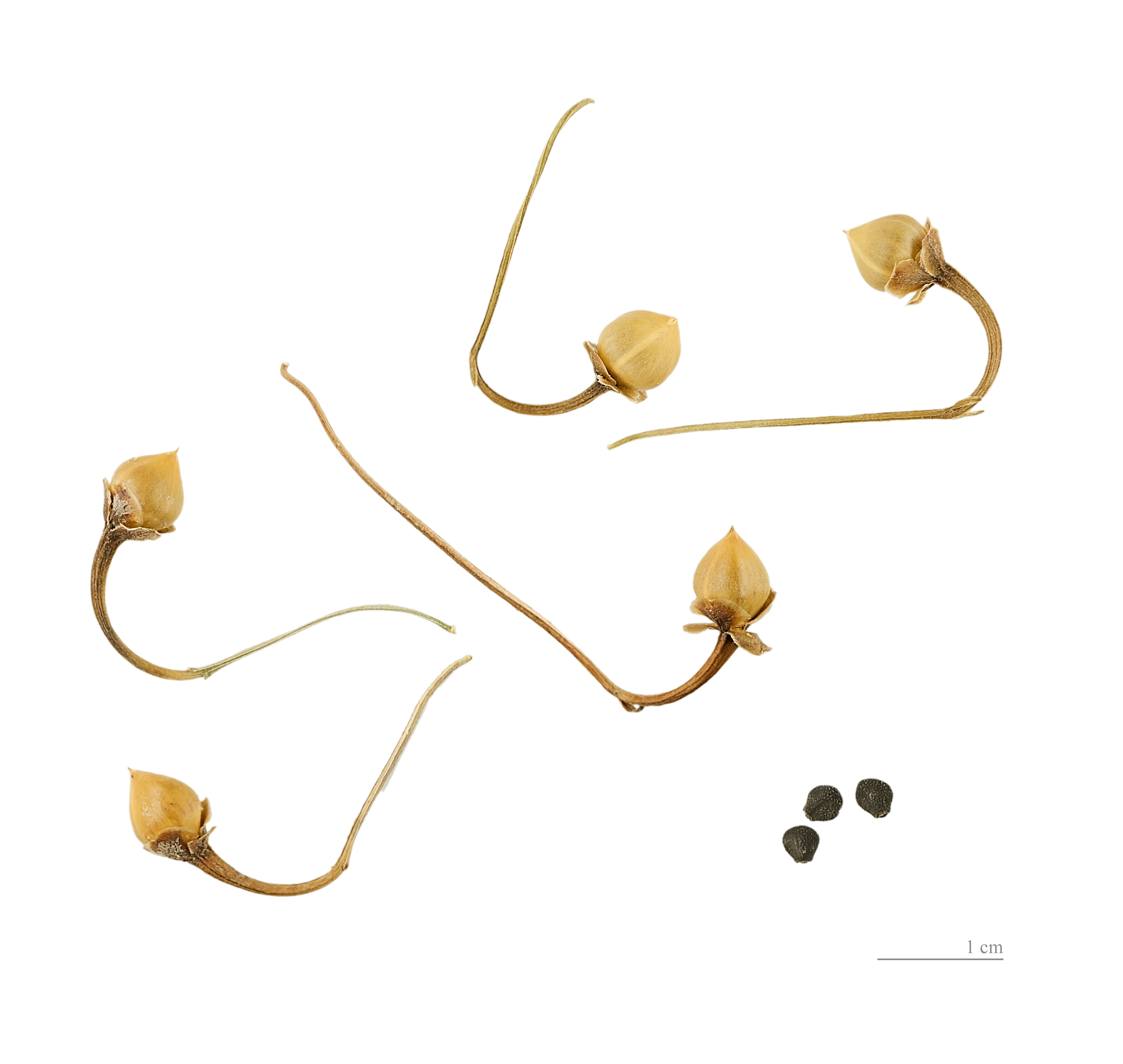
Convolvulus arvensis capsules and seeds

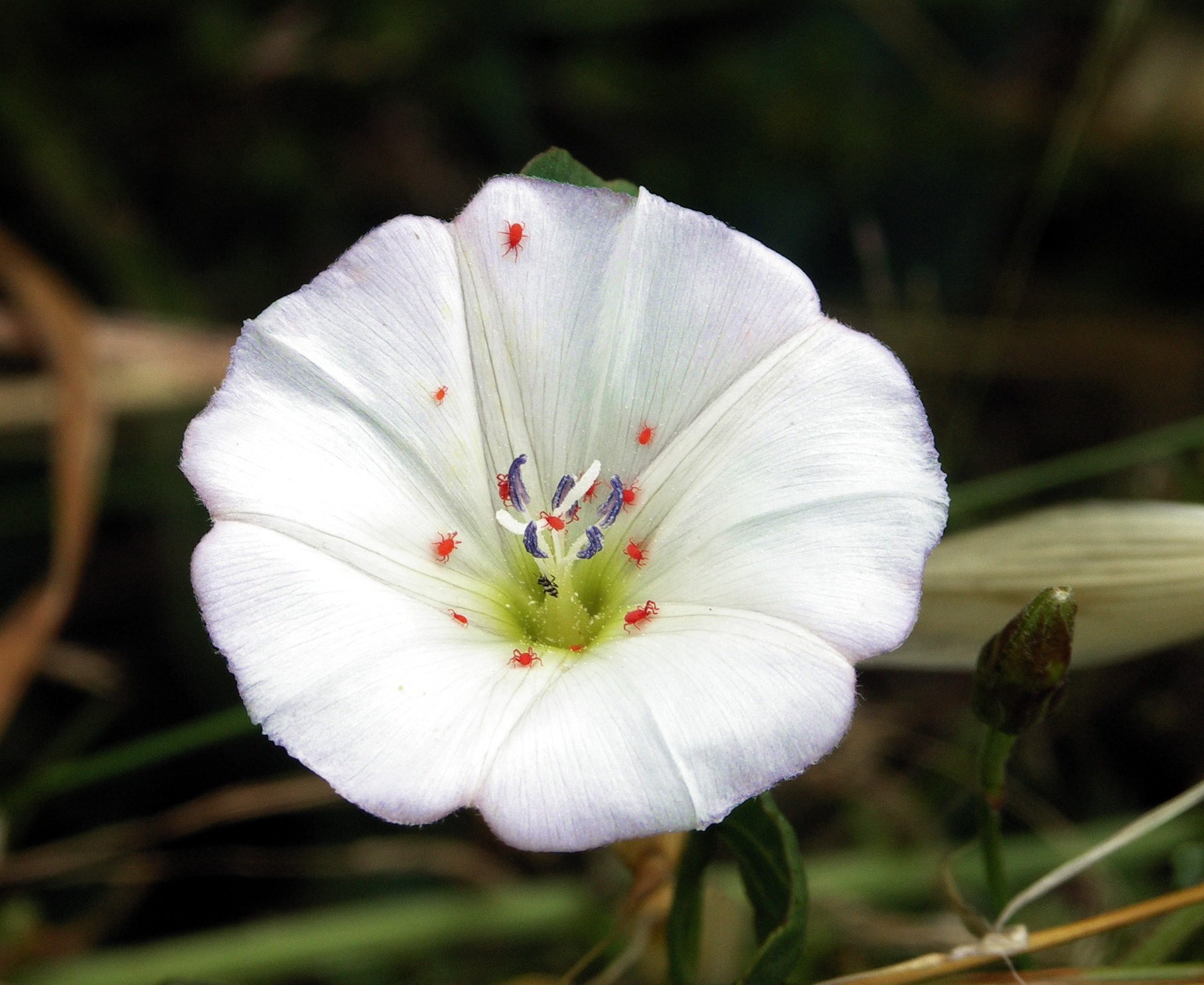
Flower with red velvet mites

=== Similar species ===
Convolvulus arvensis can be confused with a number of similar species. Key traits of C. arvensis are the small flowers often crowded together, and two sharp, backwards-pointed lobes at the base of the usually arrow-shaped leaf ending in a sharp apex. Juvenile stems exude a milky sap when broken. Similar species include:

- Convolvulus sepium - Large white flowers. Squarish or rounded lobes at the base of the leaf.
- C. spithamaeus - Leaf apex is rounded. Large white flowers. Only occurs in North America.
- Fagopyrum tataricum - Annual. No milky sap.
- Fallopia convolvulus - Small greenish flowers. No milky sap.
- Ipomoea spp. - Ornamental species are summer annuals. More rounded, heart-shaped leaves in most species.

In China, the most similar vining Convolvulus species is Convolvulus steppicola. Most other Convolvulus species are shrubs or herbaceous perennials, however Convolvulus steppicola has a thick woody rootstock, almost no petioles, and only grows in northern Yunnan, where C. arvensis is absent.

== Ecology ==
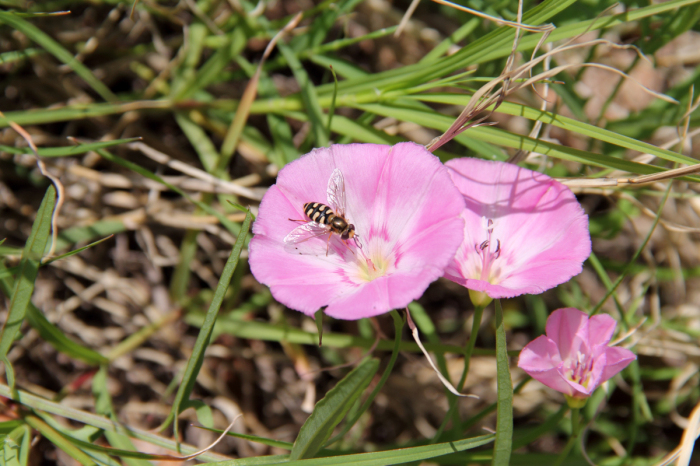
Convolvulus arvensis with a pollinator

Plants are typically found inhabiting farmland, waste places, along roads, in pastures, grassy slopes, and also along streams in North America. It is able to colonise hot asphalt surfaces by covering it from the sides of roads, and worm its way between pavement stones. It grows from 600 to 4,500 metres (2,000 to 14,800 ft) in altitude in China, and is absent from the warmer southern provinces. It prefers dry areas with humus-poor, nutrient-rich and alkaline soils. It is a characteristic species in the phytosociological vegetation association Convolvulo-Agropyretum, belonging to the couch grass dry grasslands alliance (called Convolvulo-Agropyrion repentis in syntaxonomy).

Like the other Convolvulus bindweeds of Eurasia, it is specifically pollinated by sweat bees in the genus Systropha. These are specialists (oligolectic) feeding upon the flowers of these plants, possessing unusual modifications of the scopa, such that almost the entire abdomen (including the dorsal surface) is used for carrying pollen, rather than the legs, as in most bees. Species of Systropha in central Europe (such as S. curvicornis and S. planidens, both uncommon bees) are essentially entirely dependent upon C. arvensis. Although both species specialise on the same plant species, S. curvicornis is a habitat generalist while S. planidens is only found in steppe habitats, although they are also found occurring together. The males of both species claim territories consisting of a patch of bindweed flowers, perching on the flowers in the afternoon after a regular patrol of their little patch for errant conspecific males, which, upon countenance, they proceed to attack the intruder by ramming him from the air with a specialised protuberance on their lower abdomen.

Sometimes bumblebees, honey bees or other insects are air-bombed, but never rammed. The males retreat inside the flower after the perching session, as it closes in the late afternoon, spending the night inside the flower and escaping at dawn before or after it fully closes (the females stay in underground tunnel nests). The males only land on flowers (sometimes of other plants), eschewing other perches, and feed on the nectar. Females forage for nectar and pollen in the morning and early afternoon while flowers stay open. Most copulation occurs in bindweed flowers: when a virgin female wanders into their patch, and the larger males find them busy at one of their flowers during morning patrol, the males pounce upon them without ado and immediately establish contact with their mutual genitalia, getting the job done on average 90 seconds later. These species are themselves specifically parasitised upon by the cuckoo bee Biastes brevicornis.

=== As an invasive species ===
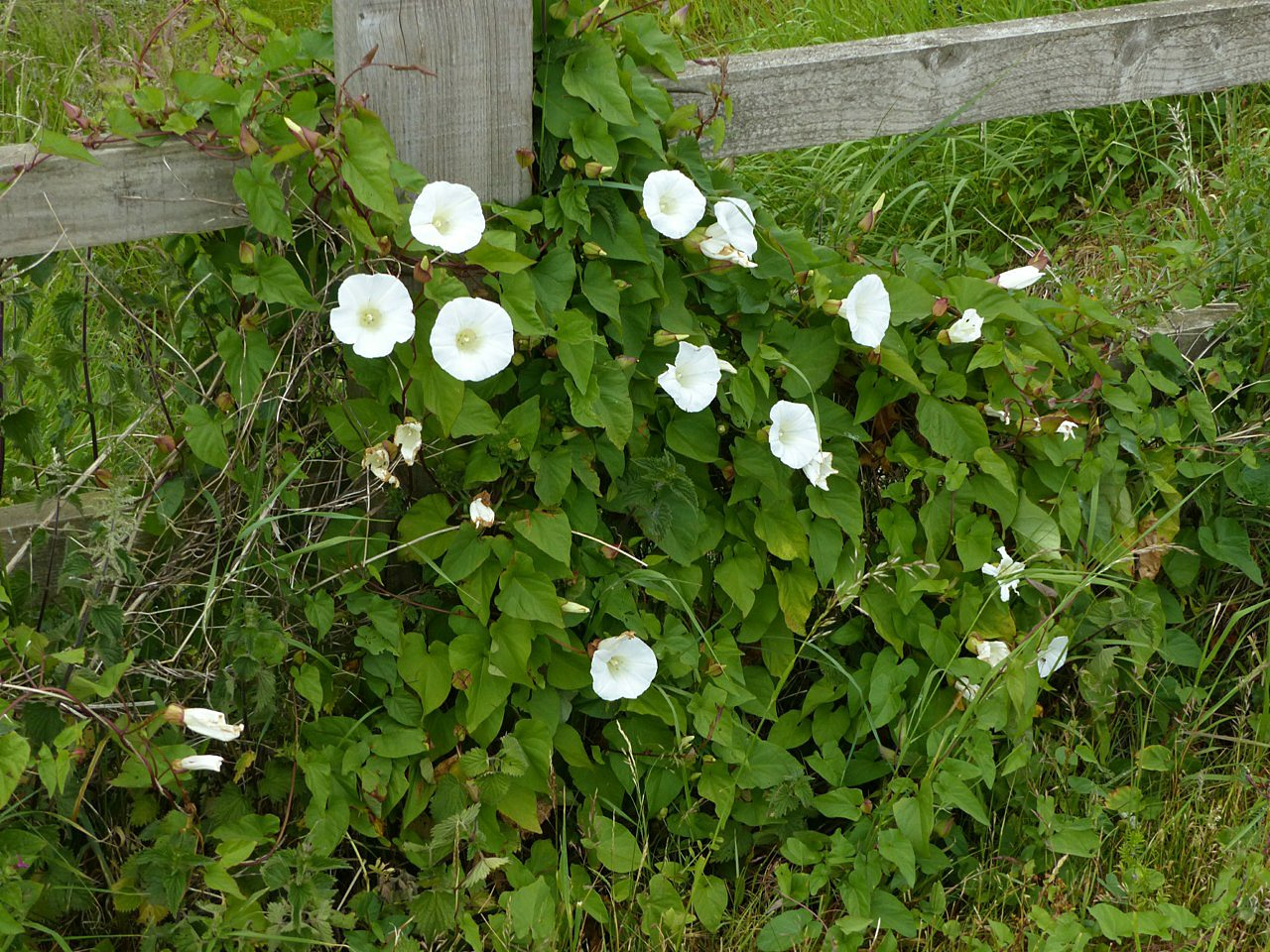
Growing in a disturbed area as weed

Outside its native range, field bindweed does not appear to be a significant threat to natural habitats. It primarily requires disturbed ground (agricultural land), and is easily shaded out by taller shrubs and trees. It may dominate the ground flora in some low quality, open grassland areas, however. In North America it can become the or a co-dominant plant in specific habitats: the low vegetation found around vernal pools in Sacramento County, and around large pools in Tehama County, California; riparian corridors in Wyoming and Colorado; aspen stands and mountain-mahogany (Cercocarpus spp.) shrubland/grassland in Colorado; and disturbed riverbank areas in the Montreal area of Canada.

In some nature parks, it is commonly found in areas of disturbed soil, such as camp grounds or around horse corrals in California. Similarly, the report of its invasive character from Colorado is from former agricultural land being restored to a more natural state by The Nature Conservancy. Employees for the same organisation also reported that it was a significant weed on an irrigated plot of farmland in northern Idaho where native bunchgrass and forbs were cultivated, insofar that it caused "decreasing biodiversity" on the land.

A study conducted in 2003 has shown that with future global atmospheric carbon levels, field bindweed shows increased growth with increased atmospheric carbon which could potentially expand its range and outcompete native species that might not tolerate such conditions.

It is thought to have little effect on native fauna, although it may sometime be eaten by farm livestock. It may cause photosensitisation in susceptible animals. There is a report of its roots (rhizomes) being possibly poisonous to pigs. and the alkaloids it contains may be poisonous to horses in sufficient amounts. There are also reports of it being eaten by sheep and pigs to control it without reported problems.

== Chemistry and uses ==
Bindweed contains several alkaloids which are toxic for mice, including pseudotropine, and lesser amounts of tropine, tropinone, and meso-cuscohygrine. The alkaloids are also reported to give the plant psychoactive properties. Its leaves contain glycosides and have been traditionally used to treat hypertension and as a laxative and diuretic.

== Economic impacts ==
Although it produces attractive flowers, it is often unwelcome in gardens as a nuisance weed due to its rapid growth and choking of cultivated plants. It was most likely introduced into North America as a contaminant in crop seed as early as 1739, and became an invasive species. Its dense mats invade agricultural fields and reduce crop yields; it is estimated that crop losses due to this plant in the United States exceeded US$377 million in the year 1998 alone. It is one of the most serious weeds of agricultural fields in many temperate regions of the US.

=== Control and management ===
Bindweed is difficult to eliminate. The roots may extend several metres deep. New plants may sprout from seeds that are up to 20 years old. New plants can also form from root runners and root fragments.

Methods for controlling bindweed include:

- Physical removal: Bindweed can be controlled by pulling it out by hand or ploughing it up every three weeks, though this must continue for two to seven years to kill the plant entirely.
- Mulching: Applying a thick barrier to block sun may control bindweed.
- Soil solarisation for six to nine weeks in California was found to kill seedlings entirely, and control adult plants, but only for three weeks after treatment.
- Boiling water, placed on the plant, only practical for small areas.
- Biological control: Some insects like the Field Bindweed moth (Tyta luctuos) and Bindweed gall mite (Aceria malher) can eat, distort or stunt bindweed, but do not fully control it.
- Grazing: In Minnesota, sheep are able to consistently completely rid an infested pasture of the bindweed in two seasons, but only when the pasture is used to grow annual grains.
- In general, plant species which grow vigorously in the winter and early spring are best at smothering emerging shoots.

== In culture ==
In one of the tales collected by Jacob and Wilhelm Grimm, Our Lady's Little Glass, this flower is used by Mary, mother of Jesus, to drink wine with when she helps free a wagoner's cart. The story goes on to say that "the little flower is still always called Our Lady's Little Glass".
