= Rusavskia indochinensis =

Scientific classification
- Kingdom: Fungi
- Division: Ascomycota
- Class: Lecanoromycetes
- Order: Teloschistales
- Family: Teloschistaceae
- Genus: Rusavskia
- Species: R. indochinensis

Binomial name
- Rusavskia indochinensis S.Y.Kondr., G.K.Mishra, S.Nayaka & D.K.Upreti (2020)

Species of lichen

Rusavskia indochinensis is a species of saxicolous (rock-dwelling) lichen in the family Teloschistaceae. It occurs in India and China.

== Taxonomy ==
Rusavskia indochinensis was described as a new species in 2020 by lichenologists Sergey Kondratyuk, Gaurav Kumar Mishra, Sanjeeva Nayaka, and Dalip Kumar Upreti. The species epithet indochinensis refers to the southern part of the Asian continent, which is where this species has been identified. The type specimen was collected in India, specifically in Uttarakhand's Chamoli district, 17 km (11 mi) before Malari on the way to Niti at an altitude of 2,462 m (8,077 ft).

While Rusavskia indochinensis is categorically part of the Rusavskia branch based on its Internal transcribed spacer nrDNA phylogeny, its resemblance to species of the genus Zeroviella suggests the need for more molecular data for precise classification. Chinese specimens, in particular, require further molecular examination to determine their exact status.

== Description ==
The thallus of Rusavskia indochinensis can span several centimetres, with individual thalline lobes measuring between 3–5 mm (0.12–0.20 in) in length. The lobe edges tend to bend downwards, making them look wider from the underside. The upper surface is matte, transitioning in colour from deep yellow at the tips to greyish or greenish yellow towards the centre. Pseudocyphellae (tiny pores on the outer surface for gas exchange) can sometimes be observed on this surface. The lichen's underside is typically white but turns yellow towards the tips.

Apothecia, which are the reproductive structures of the lichen, are relatively small, with a diameter ranging from 0.4–0.8 mm (0.0–0.0 in). These are coloured bright yellow to dull yellow and are raised significantly above the thalline lobe surface.

=== Similar species ===
Rusavskia indochinensis shares similarities with members of the genus Zeroviella, particularly Z. digitata, Z. domogledensis, and Z. papillifera. The primary distinguishing feature of R. indochinensis from these species is the absence of isidia-like formations. When compared to Zeroviella digitata, which is native to southeastern Europe, R. indochinensis has larger measurements of its lobes and secondary sublobules.

== Habitat and distribution ==
This lichen predominantly colonises siliceous rock outcrops. While its presence has been recorded in India and China, its distribution remains scattered and sporadic across the southern part of the Asian continent.
