= Zeroviella esfahanensis =

Scientific classification
- Kingdom: Fungi
- Division: Ascomycota
- Class: Lecanoromycetes
- Order: Teloschistales
- Family: Teloschistaceae
- Genus: Zeroviella
- Species: Z. esfahanensis

Binomial name
- Zeroviella esfahanensis S.Y.Kondr., Zarei-Darki & Hur (2015)

Species of lichen

Zeroviella esfahanensis is a species of saxicolous (rock-dwelling) foliose lichen in the family Teloschistaceae. It is found in various locations across the Palearctic realm, having been recorded in Europe, Asia, and North Africa, where it grows in alpine and cold desert areas.

== Taxonomy ==
Zeroviella esfahanensis was described by Sergey Kondratyuk, Behrouz Zarei-Darki, and Jae-Seoun Hur. Its species epithet is derived from the Esfahan Province in Iran, where the type specimen was collected. Its location specifics are Esfahan Province, roughly 250 km (160 miles) south of Tehran, near the outskirts of the Natanz settlement within the Karkas hunting-prohibited Region, at an altitude of 2,530 m (8,300 ft).

Molecular studies have shown that the taxonomic position of Zeroviella esfahanensis remains somewhat uncertain. While certain genetic markers suggest it belongs to the Zeroviella group, others place it within Rusavskia.

== Description ==
This lichen has a foliose thallus, often resembling a rosette and spanning 2–3 cm (3/4–1 1/4 in) across. Its lobes range from 3–5 millimetres (1/8–3/16 in) in length and 0.7–1.5 mm (1/32–1/16 in) in width, broadening towards the tips. They appear semi-tubular due to the edges distinctly curving downwards. The upper surface is uneven, with older lobes especially presenting numerous pseudocyphellae (small pores that facilitate gas exchange). The colouration is generally a dull brownish-orange, occasionally appearing with pruina.

Apothecia, the reproductive structures, are mostly found in the central portion of the thallus. These are lecanorine in type and have a diameter of up to 1.5 mm. The ascospores are mainly ellipsoid in shape, with dimensions varying between 9.5–14 μm in length and 6.5–9.5 μm in width.

When subjected to a potassium hydroxide (K) chemical spot test, the thallus reacts by turning purple. Chemical constituents identified include parietin, teloschistin, fallacinal, parietinic acid, and traces of emodin.

=== Similar species ===
Zeroviella esfahanensis shows similarities to several other lichen species but can be differentiated based on a few distinguishing features. When compared with Z. mandschurica, Zeroviella esfahanensis has shorter lobes that also have a larger width range. This species has an epruinose apothecial disc, which contrasts with the white pruina found in Z. mandschurica. Additionally, Zeroviella esfahanensis has a paraplectenchymatous true exciple that is well developed, while Z. mandschurica has a scleroplectenchymatous structure, which is much wider at its base. The ascospore septum of Zeroviella esfahanensis is also narrower than that of Z. mandschurica.

In comparison to Rusavskia elegans, Zeroviella esfahanensis again has shorter and wider thalline lobes. Its cortical layers are entirely paraplectenchymatous, unlike R. elegans where they are predominantly scleroplectenchymatous. This species also differs in its thinner true exciple, which is significantly less developed than in R. elegans. Furthermore, the ascospores of Zeroviella esfahanensis are somewhat shorter and the ascospore septum is narrower.

Finally, relative to Caloplaca vorukhica, Zeroviella esfahanensis is marked by a smaller thallus and thalline lobes. It is distinctive due to the presence of numerous pseudocyphellae and a less developed true exciple. The ascospores of Zeroviella esfahanensis are smaller and the septum is also narrower. This species does not have the hollow medulla found in C. vorukhica, and it also lacks scleroplectenchymatous tissue in both the upper and lower cortical layers, as well as papillae in the centre of the thallus.

== Habitat and distribution ==
Zeroviella esfahanensis predominantly inhabits alpine and cold desert areas. It favours large siliceous boulders, colonising both their sun-exposed subvertical and horizontal faces. The lichen has been identified in various locations across the Palearctic realm, encompassing regions in Europe, Asia, and North Africa. It was recorded as new to China in 2016, and to India in 2017.
