= Micralictoides =

Scientific classification
- Domain: Eukaryota
- Kingdom: Animalia
- Phylum: Arthropoda
- Class: Insecta
- Order: Hymenoptera
- Family: Halictidae
- Subfamily: Rophitinae
- Genus: Micralictoides; Timberlake, 1939

Genus of bees

Micralictoides is a genus of sweat bees in the family Halictidae. There are about eight described species in Micralictoides.

== Species ==
These eight species belong to the genus Micralictoides:

- Micralictoides altadenae (Michener, 1937)
- Micralictoides chaenactidis Bohart & Griswold, 1987
- Micralictoides dinoceps Bohart & Griswold, 1987
- Micralictoides grossus Bohart & Griswold, 1987
- Micralictoides linsleyi Bohart & Griswold, 1987
- Micralictoides mojavensis Bohart, 1942
- Micralictoides quadriceps Bohart & Griswold, 1987
- Micralictoides ruficaudus (Michener, 1937)
