= Systropha tropicalis =

Scientific classification
- Kingdom: Animalia
- Phylum: Arthropoda
- Class: Insecta
- Order: Hymenoptera
- Family: Halictidae
- Genus: Systropha
- Species: S. tropicalis

Binomial name
- Systropha tropicalis Cockerell, 1911

Species of bee

Systropha tropicalis is a species of bee in the genus Systropha, of the family Halictidae.
