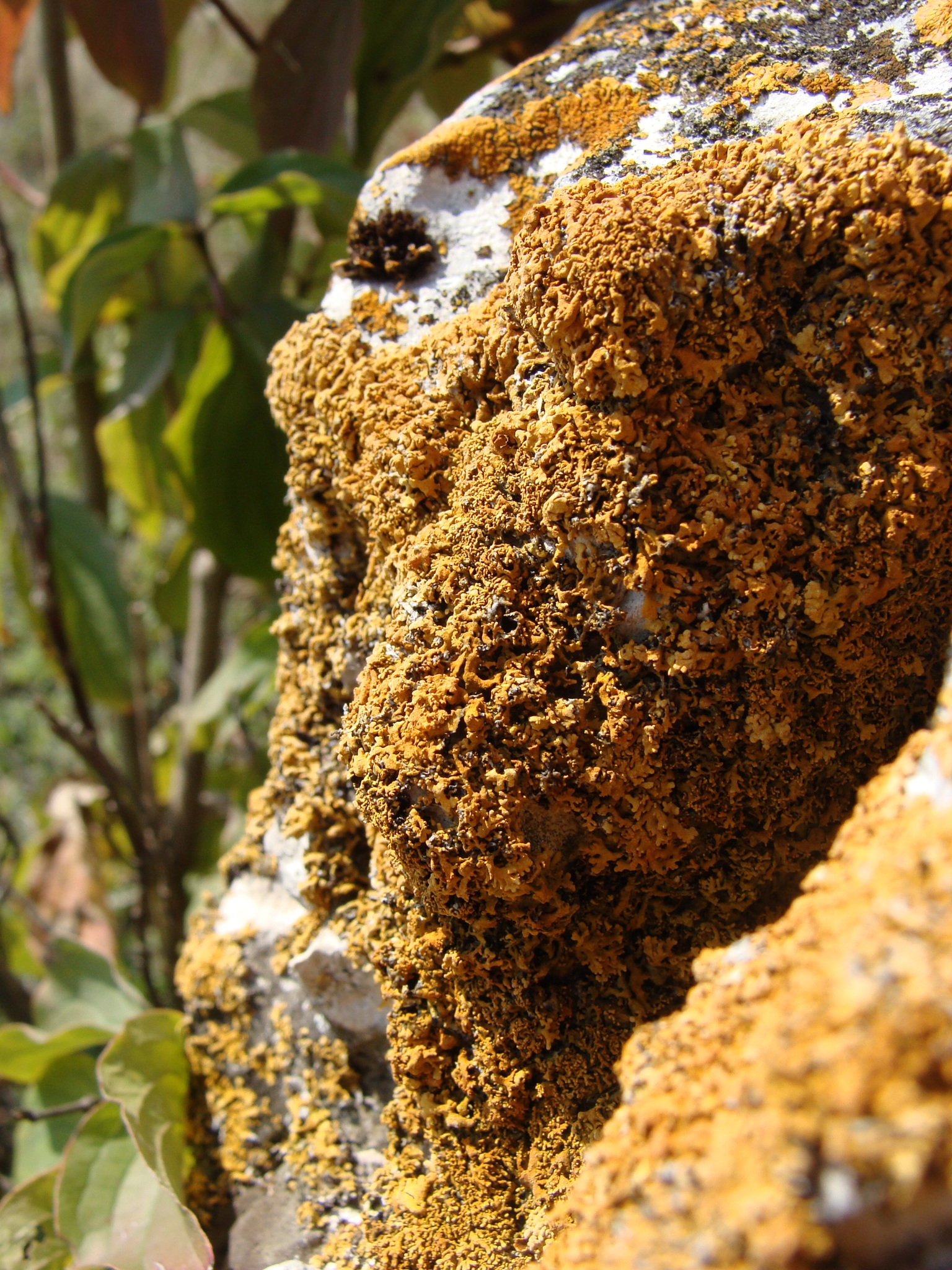
- Zeroviella papillifera

Scientific classification
- Domain: Eukaryota
- Kingdom: Fungi
- Division: Ascomycota
- Class: Lecanoromycetes
- Order: Teloschistales
- Family: Teloschistaceae
- Genus: Zeroviella; S.Y.Kondr. & Hur (2015)

Type species
- Zeroviella papillifera (Vain.) S.Y.Kondr. & Hur (2015)

= Zeroviella =

Genus of lichens

Zeroviella is a genus of lichen-forming fungi in the subfamily Xanthorioideae of the family Teloschistaceae. It has eight saxicolous (rock-dwelling) species. Zeroviella was segregated from Rusavskia, a closely related genus, in 2015.

== Taxonomy ==
The genus was circumscribed by lichenologists Sergey Kondratyuk and Jae-Seoun Hur in 2015, to contain the species complex centred around Rusavskia papillifera. Accordingly, Zeroviella papillifera was assigned as the type species of the genus. According to their phylogenetic analysis, these species formed a monophyletic branch, warranting distinction as a new genus.

Members of the genus Zeroviella exhibit distinct differences from those of the genus Rusavskia. Notably, Zeroviella has paraplectenchymatous cortical layers throughout the thallus, in contrast to Rusavskia, which primarily features scleroplectenchymatous tissue with only a slight paraplectenchymatous layer. Additionally, the thalline lobes of Zeroviella are noticeably thinner, attributed to the absence of a well-developed hollow in the medulla. This genus also typically displays pronounced pseudocyphellae (pores on the cortex).

While Zeroviella lobes appear convex due to their downward-bending edges, those of Rusavskia are extremely convex with a prominent hollow medulla. Geographically, Zeroviella is mainly found in Mediterranean and Eastern Eurasian regions, whereas Rusavskia has a bipolar distribution (i.e., occurring at both polar regions) and is present at high altitudes across all continents. Phylogenetic analyses further distinguish the two, with Zeroviella positioned on a separate monophyletic branch.

The genus name honours Ukrainian botanist Dmytro K. Zerov (1895–1971), "to acknowledge his contributions, especially to the Eurasian flora of liverworts and sphagnous mosses."

== Description ==
Zeroviella has a foliose form and tends to grow on rocks. The thallus, or main body of the lichen, presents in vibrant shades ranging from yellow and orange to a deeper reddish-orange. It adheres firmly to its substrate, attaching from its lower side.

Its cortical layers have a paraplectenchymatous texture, while its medullary layer lacks a prominently developed cavity. The apothecia (reproductive structures) of Zeroviella are of the zeorine/lecanorine type, with a true exciple that is scleroplectenchymatous in nature. When it comes to the reproductive conidia, they manifest as narrowly elongated and rod-shaped (bacilliform).

Chemically, Zeroviella contains a dominant compound known as parietin, but the genus also contains other substances like teloschistin, fallacinal, and parietinic acid; traces of emodin are present as well.

== Habitat and distribution ==
The lichen genus Zeroviella thrives predominantly in coastal areas, often colonising large siliceous boulders. It can be found on both more or less vertical and horizontal rock surfaces that are sun-exposed. Beyond the coasts, Zeroviella extends to high-altitude mountainous regions, with a particular preference for areas featuring limestone outcrops.

The genus comprises eight species. Among these, Zeroviella papillifera is the most widespread. While Z. mandschurica and Z. esfahanensis are commonly found across the Asian continent, species like Z. coreana, Z. digitata, and Z. ussurica have a more limited range. Z. laxa was reported as new to Pakistan in 2021.

In terms of its broader geographical spread, Zeroviella predominantly populates the Palearctic region, encompassing Europe, Asia, and North Africa. Although there are a few reports of Zeroviella papillifera being found in North America, these records require further verification.

== Species ==
As of September 2023, Species Fungorum (in the Catalogue of life) accepts eight species of Zeroviella.

- Zeroviella coreana (S.Y.Kondr. & Hur) S.Y.Kondr. & Hur (2015)
- Zeroviella digitata (S.Y.Kondr.) S.Y.Kondr. & Hur (2015)
- Zeroviella domogledensis (Vězda) S.Y.Kondr. & Hur (2015)
- Zeroviella esfahanensis S.Y.Kondr., Zarei-Darki & Hur (2015)
- Zeroviella laxa (Müll.Arg.) S.Y.Kondr. & Hur (2015)
- Zeroviella mandschurica (Zahlbr.) S.Y.Kondr. & Hur (2015)
- Zeroviella papillifera (Vain.) S.Y.Kondr. & Hur (2015)
- Zeroviella ussurica (S.Y.Kondr. & Hur) S.Y.Kondr. & Hur (2015)
