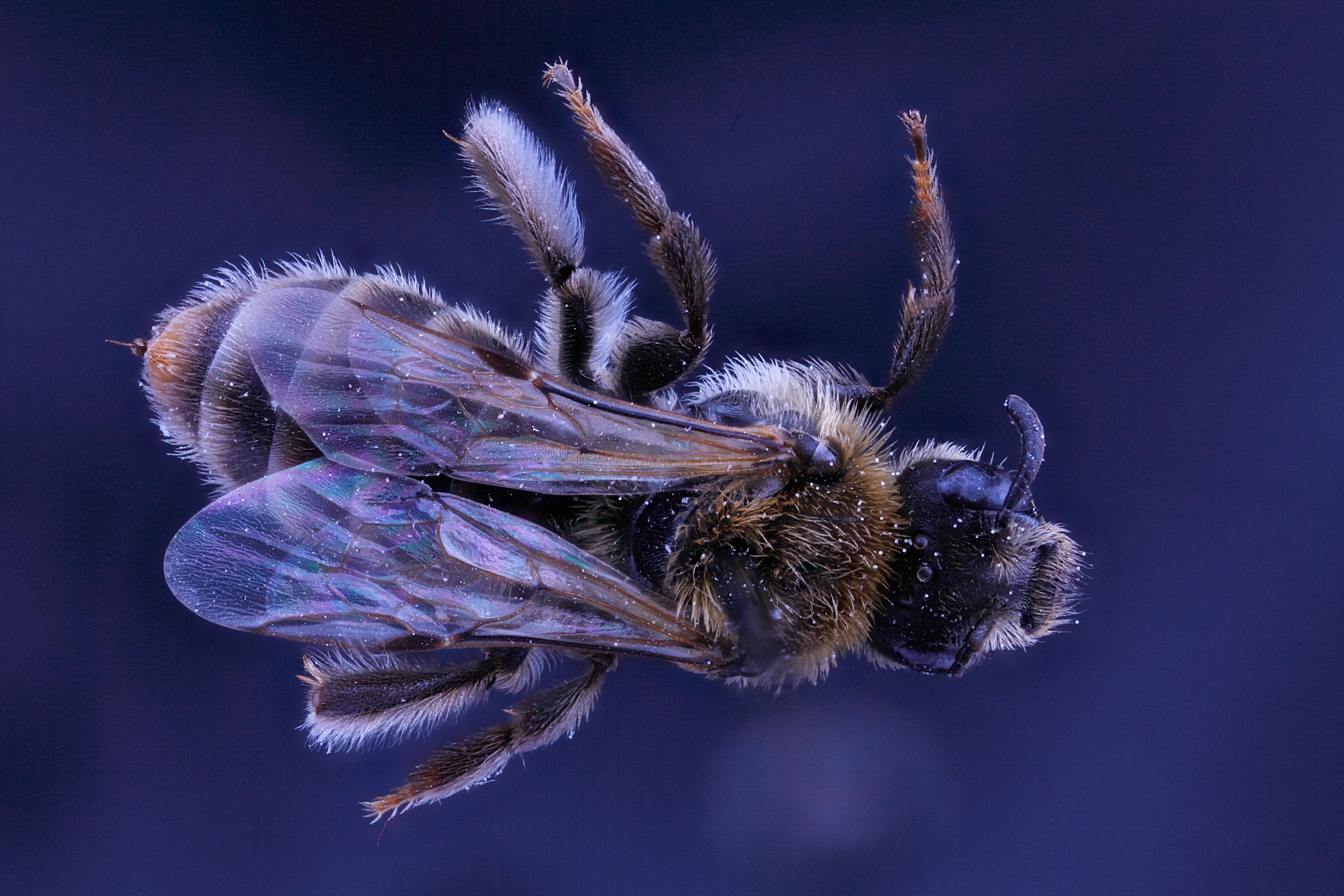
- Dufourea marginata

Scientific classification
- Domain: Eukaryota
- Kingdom: Animalia
- Phylum: Arthropoda
- Class: Insecta
- Order: Hymenoptera
- Family: Halictidae
- Subfamily: Rophitinae

= Rophitinae =

Subfamily of bees

Rophitinae is a subfamily of sweat bees in the family Halictidae. There are about 13 genera and more than 260 described species in Rophitinae.

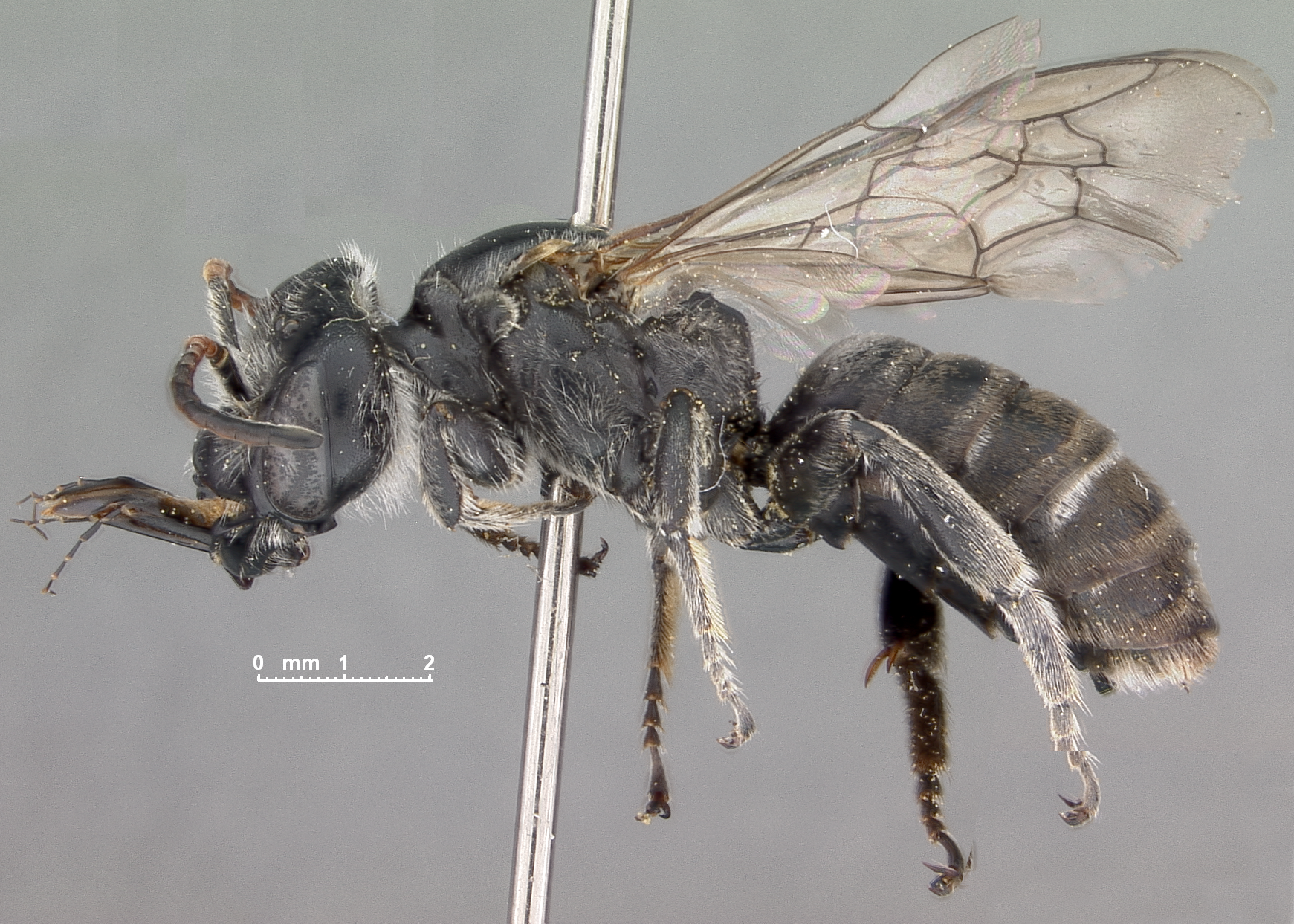
Xeralictus timberlakei

== Genera ==
These 13 genera belong to the subfamily Rophitinae:

- Ceblurgus Urban & Moure, 1993
- Conanthalictus Cockerell, 1901
- Dufourea Lepeletier, 1841
- Goeletapis Rozen, 1997
- Micralictoides Timberlake, 1939
- Morawitzella Popov, 1957
- Morawitzia Friese, 1902
- Penapis Michener, 1965
- Protodufourea Timberlake, 1955
- Rophites Spinola, 1808
- Sphecodosoma Crawford, 1907
- Systropha Illiger, 1806
- Xeralictus Cockerell, 1927
