= Protodufourea =

Scientific classification
- Domain: Eukaryota
- Kingdom: Animalia
- Phylum: Arthropoda
- Class: Insecta
- Order: Hymenoptera
- Family: Halictidae
- Subfamily: Rophitinae
- Genus: Protodufourea; Timberlake, 1955

Genus of bees

Protodufourea is a genus of sweat bees in the family Halictidae. There are about five described species in Protodufourea.

== Species ==
These five species belong to the genus Protodufourea:

- Protodufourea eickworti Bohart & Griswold, 1997
- Protodufourea koso Bohart & Griswold, 1997
- Protodufourea parca Timberlake, 1955
- Protodufourea wasbaueri Timberlake, 1955
- Protodufourea zavortinki Bohart & Griswold, 1997
