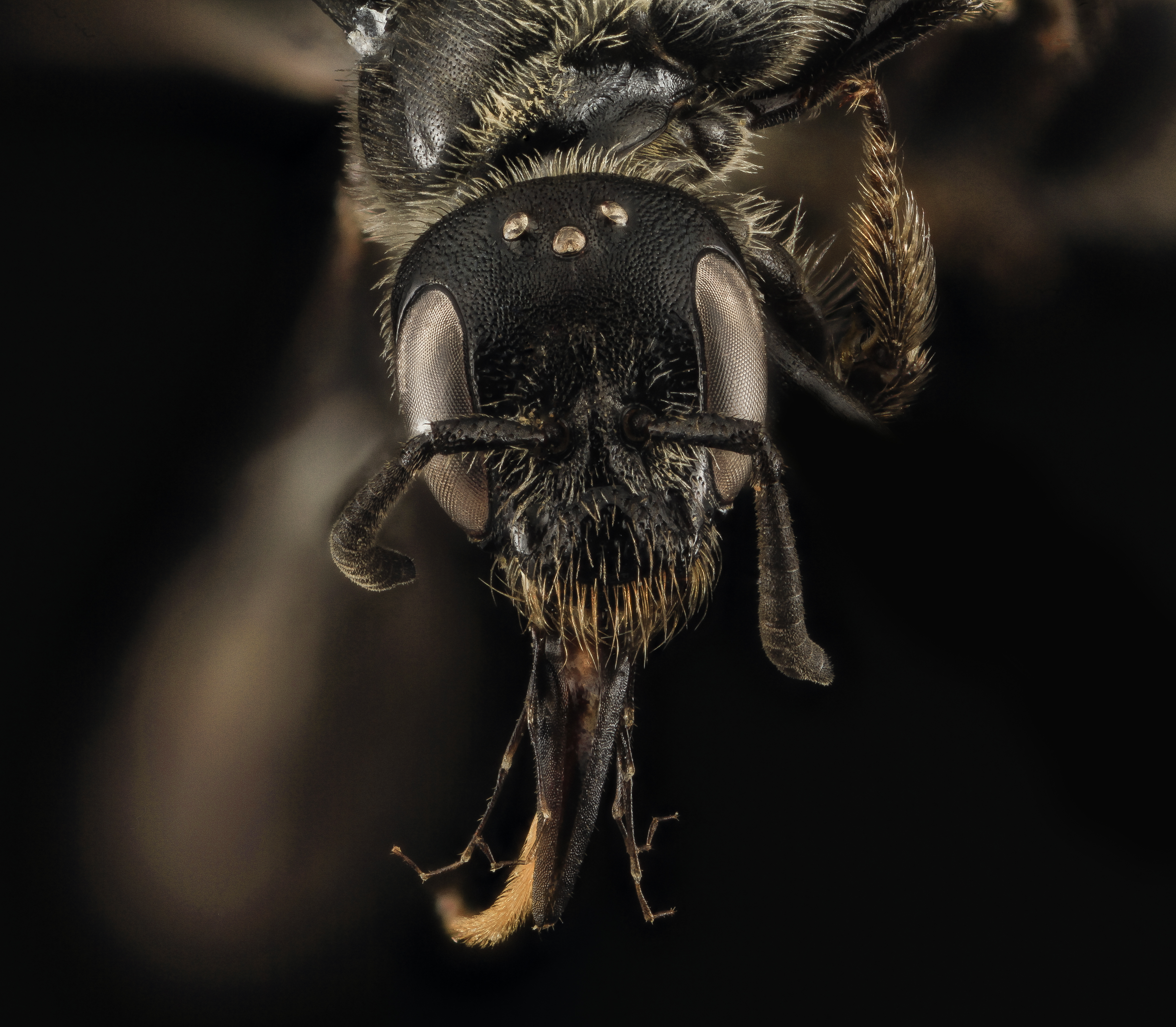

Scientific classification
- Domain: Eukaryota
- Kingdom: Animalia
- Phylum: Arthropoda
- Class: Insecta
- Order: Hymenoptera
- Family: Halictidae
- Genus: Dufourea
- Species: D. monardae

Binomial name
- Dufourea monardae (Viereck, 1924)

= Dufourea monardae =

Species of bee

Dufourea monardae, Conohalictoides monardae, also known as the Beebalm Shortface Bee, is a species of sweat bee in the family Halictidae. It is found in North America and is typically active during July and August. It is an oligolectic bee on bee balm plants.

== Description ==
Adult females measure about 7 mm in length and are black with sparse pale hairs and a strongly protuberant face. Males are 6–7 mm long, similar in color, with a longer head, lightly infuscated wings, and unmodified slender hind legs. Both sexes have smooth, shiny abdominal segments and short pale pubescence.
