= Sphecodosoma dicksoni =

Scientific classification
- Domain: Eukaryota
- Kingdom: Animalia
- Phylum: Arthropoda
- Class: Insecta
- Order: Hymenoptera
- Family: Halictidae
- Genus: Sphecodosoma
- Species: S. dicksoni

Binomial name
- Sphecodosoma dicksoni (Timberlake, 1961)

Species of bee

Sphecodosoma dicksoni is a species of sweat bee in the family Halictidae. It is found in Central America and North America.
