= Dufourea versatilis =

Scientific classification
- Domain: Eukaryota
- Kingdom: Animalia
- Phylum: Arthropoda
- Class: Insecta
- Order: Hymenoptera
- Family: Halictidae
- Genus: Dufourea
- Species: D. versatilis

Binomial name
- Dufourea versatilis (Bridwell, 1919)

Species of bee

Dufourea versatilis is a species of sweat bee in the family Halictidae. It is found in North America.

== Subspecies ==
These two subspecies belong to the species Dufourea versatilis:

- Dufourea versatilis rubriventris Michener, 1951
- Dufourea versatilis versatilis (Bridwell, 1919)
