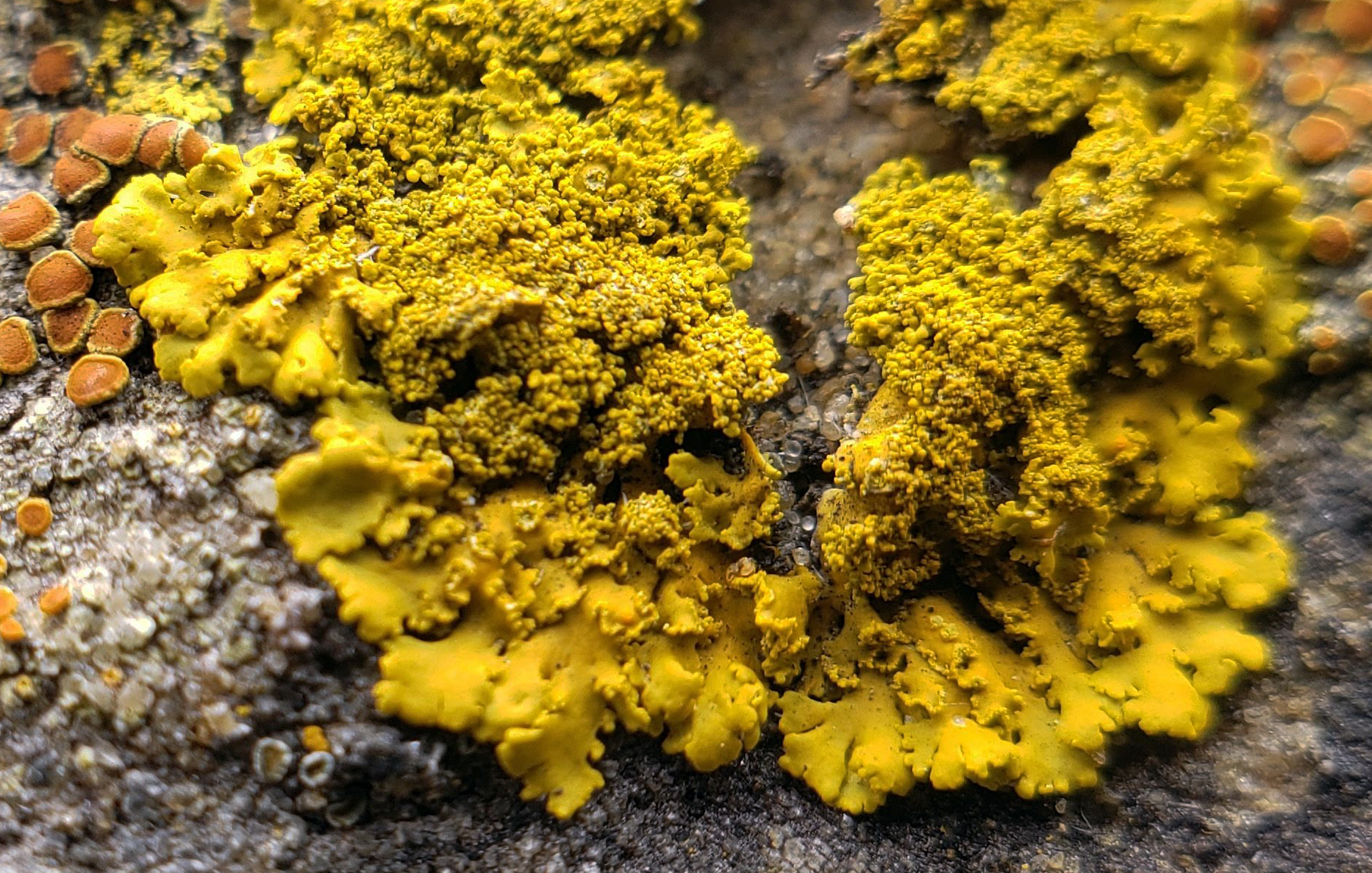

Conservation status
- Secure (NatureServe)

Scientific classification
- Kingdom: Fungi
- Division: Ascomycota
- Class: Lecanoromycetes
- Order: Teloschistales
- Family: Teloschistaceae
- Genus: Rusavskia
- Species: R. sorediata

Binomial name
- Rusavskia sorediata (Vain.) S.Y.Kondr. & Kärnefelt (2003)

Synonyms
- List: Lecanora elegans var. sorediata Vain. (1881); Placodium elegans var. sorediatum (Vain.) H.Olivier (1909); Caloplaca sorediata (Vain.) Du Rietz (1916); Placodium granulosum var. sorediata (Vain.) Räsänen (1936); Placodium granulosum f. sorediata (Vain.) Räsänen (1939); Xanthoria sorediata (Vain.) Poelt (1954); Gasparrinia sorediata (Vain.) Oxner (1990)

= Rusavskia sorediata =

Species of lichen-forming fungus

Rusavskia sorediata is a species of saxicolous (rock-dwelling), crustose lichen in the family Teloschistaceae. It is widely distributed in the Northern Hemisphere.

The lichen was first formally described by the Finnish lichenologist Edvard August Vainio in 1881, as Lecanora elegans var. sorediata. Gustaf Einar Du Rietz transferred it to Caloplaca in 1916. Josef Poelt considered it better in genus Xanthoria, and it was known by that binomial for several decades. In 2003, Sergey Kondratyuk and Ingvar Kärnefelt transferred it to their newly circumscribed genus Rusavskia.

The lichen develops small, spherical pustules on its surface, which eventually become granular soredia. These soredia can range in abundance from hardly there to covering nearly the entire thallus surface. Because of the characteristic appearance imparted by these granular propagules, in North America, a common name used for this species is sugared sunburst lichen. Rusavskia sorediata has an Arctic-oreophytic distribution; "oreophytic" refers to plants (and by extension, lichens or other organisms) that are adapted to live in mountainous regions, especially those growing above the forest line but below the permanent snow line. It has been recorded in Asia, Europe, North America, and Greenland. In Nepal, R. sorediata has been reported from 3,200 to 5,000 m elevation in a compilation of published records; this reported range extends above the tree line used in the study.
