= Conanthalictus =

Scientific classification
- Kingdom: Animalia
- Phylum: Arthropoda
- Class: Insecta
- Order: Hymenoptera
- Family: Halictidae
- Subfamily: Rophitinae
- Genus: Conanthalictus; Cockerell, 1901

Genus of bees

Conanthalictus is a genus of sweat bees in the family Halictidae. There are about 13 described species in Conanthalictus.

== Species ==
- Conanthalictus bakeri Crawford, 1907
- Conanthalictus caerulescens Timberlake, 1961
- Conanthalictus cockerelli Timberlake, 1961
- Conanthalictus conanthi (Cockerell, 1901)
- Conanthalictus cotullensis Crawford, 1907
- Conanthalictus deserticola Timberlake, 1961
- Conanthalictus macrops Cockerell, 1916
- Conanthalictus mentzeliae Timberlake, 1961
- Conanthalictus minor Timberlake, 1961
- Conanthalictus namatophilus Timberlake, 1961
- Conanthalictus nigricans Timberlake, 1961
- Conanthalictus seminiger Michener, 1937
- Conanthalictus wilmattae Cockerell, 1936
