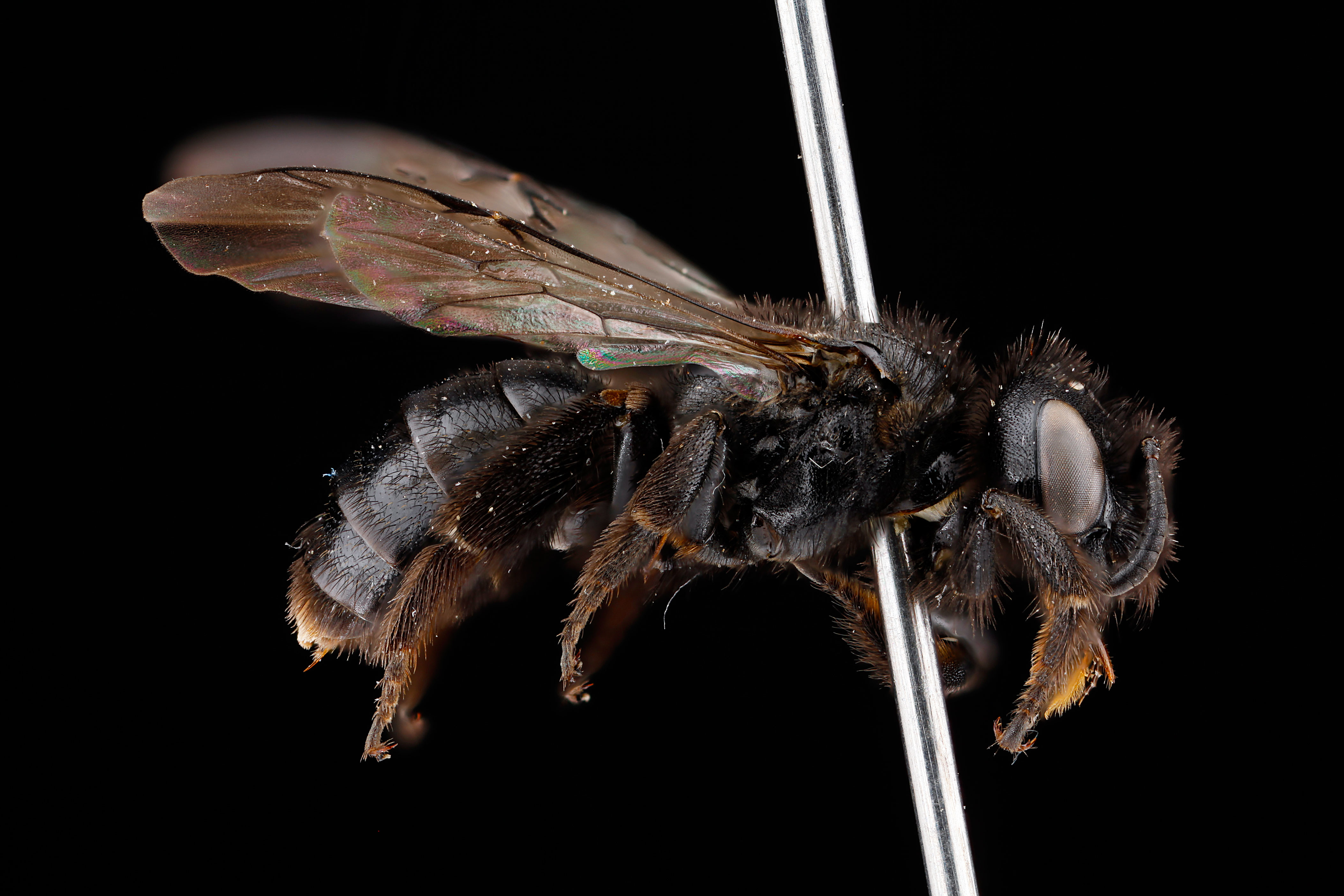

Scientific classification
- Domain: Eukaryota
- Kingdom: Animalia
- Phylum: Arthropoda
- Class: Insecta
- Order: Hymenoptera
- Family: Halictidae
- Genus: Dufourea
- Species: D. maura

Binomial name
- Dufourea maura (Cresson, 1878)

= Dufourea maura =

Species of bee

Dufourea maura is a species of sweat bee in the family Halictidae. It is found in North America.
