= Conanthalictus bakeri =

Scientific classification
- Domain: Eukaryota
- Kingdom: Animalia
- Phylum: Arthropoda
- Class: Insecta
- Order: Hymenoptera
- Family: Halictidae
- Genus: Conanthalictus
- Species: C. bakeri

Binomial name
- Conanthalictus bakeri Crawford, 1907

Species of bee

Conanthalictus bakeri is a species of sweat bee in the family Halictidae. It is found in North America.
