= Protodufourea eickworti =

Scientific classification
- Domain: Eukaryota
- Kingdom: Animalia
- Phylum: Arthropoda
- Class: Insecta
- Order: Hymenoptera
- Family: Halictidae
- Genus: Protodufourea
- Species: P. eickworti

Binomial name
- Protodufourea eickworti Bohart & Griswold, 1997

Species of bee

Protodufourea eickworti is a species of sweat bee in the family Halictidae. It is found in North America.
