= Dufourea echinocacti =

Scientific classification
- Domain: Eukaryota
- Kingdom: Animalia
- Phylum: Arthropoda
- Class: Insecta
- Order: Hymenoptera
- Family: Halictidae
- Genus: Dufourea
- Species: D. echinocacti

Binomial name
- Dufourea echinocacti Timberlake, 1939

Species of bee

Dufourea echinocacti, the barrel cactus dufourea, is a species of sweat bee in the family Halictidae. It is found in North America, mainly in California and northwestern Mexico. The name Echinocacti comes from its affinity for the Echinocactus genus of barrel cactus, which are found throughout the Dufourea echinicacti's habitat. It was first described by Philip Hunter Timberlake in 1939.
