= Micralictoides ruficaudus =

Scientific classification
- Domain: Eukaryota
- Kingdom: Animalia
- Phylum: Arthropoda
- Class: Insecta
- Order: Hymenoptera
- Family: Halictidae
- Genus: Micralictoides
- Species: M. ruficaudus

Binomial name
- Micralictoides ruficaudus (Michener, 1937)

Species of bee

Micralictoides ruficaudus is a species of sweat bee in the family Halictidae. It is found in North America.
