= Sphecodosoma =

Scientific classification
- Domain: Eukaryota
- Kingdom: Animalia
- Phylum: Arthropoda
- Class: Insecta
- Order: Hymenoptera
- Family: Halictidae
- Subfamily: Rophitinae
- Genus: Sphecodosoma; Crawford, 1907

Genus of bees

Sphecodosoma is a genus of sweat bees in the family Halictidae. There are at least three described species in Sphecodosoma.

== Species ==
These three species belong to the genus Sphecodosoma:

- Sphecodosoma beameri (Bohart, 1965)
- Sphecodosoma dicksoni (Timberlake, 1961)
- Sphecodosoma pratti Crawford, 1907
