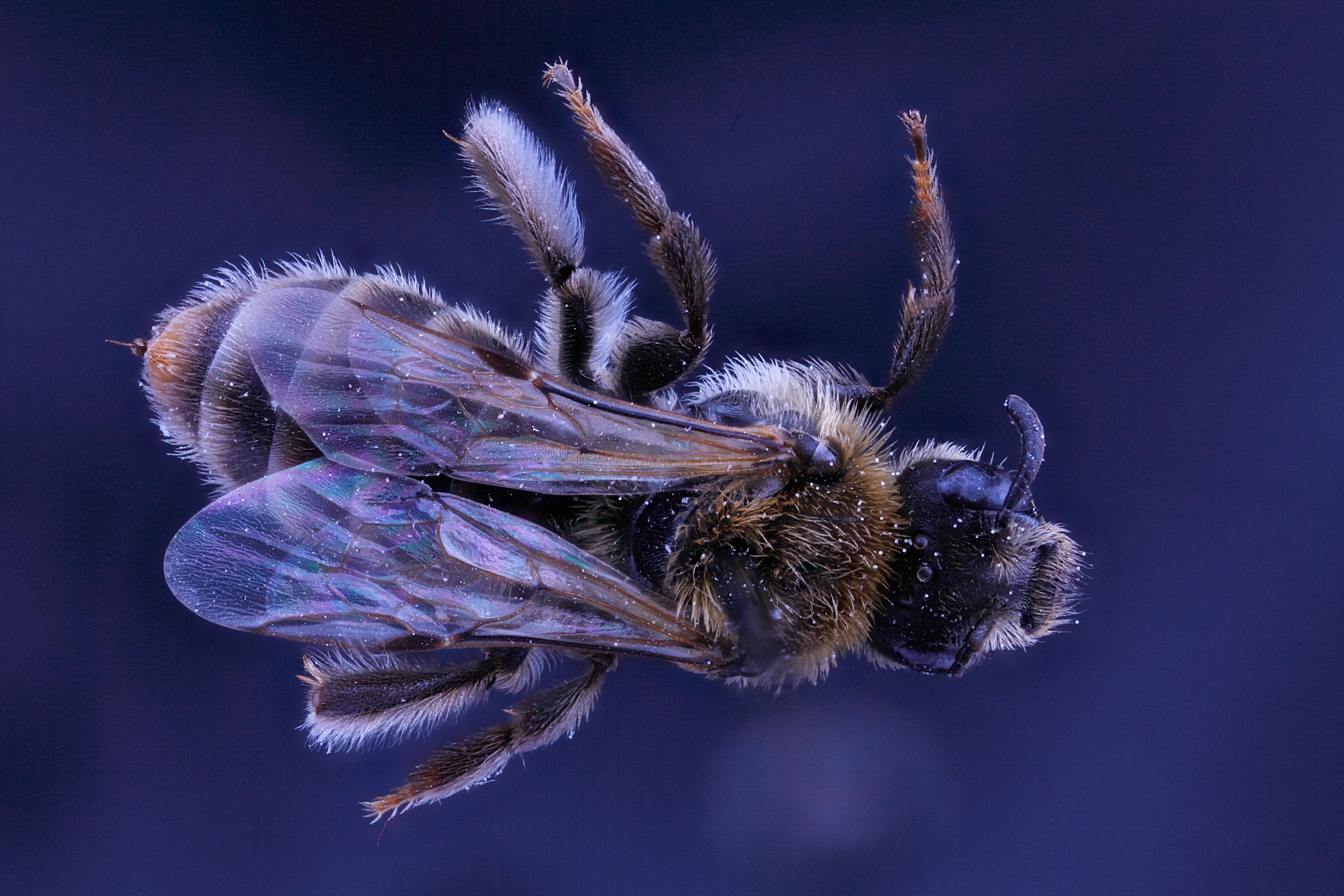

Scientific classification
- Domain: Eukaryota
- Kingdom: Animalia
- Phylum: Arthropoda
- Class: Insecta
- Order: Hymenoptera
- Family: Halictidae
- Genus: Dufourea
- Species: D. marginata

Binomial name
- Dufourea marginata (Cresson, 1878)

= Dufourea marginata =

Species of bee

Dufourea marginata is a species of sweat bee in the family Halictidae. It is found in North America.

== Subspecies ==
These two subspecies belong to the species Dufourea marginata:

- Dufourea marginata halictella Michener, 1951
- Dufourea marginata marginata (Cresson, 1878)
