= Rusavskia indica =

Scientific classification
- Kingdom: Fungi
- Division: Ascomycota
- Class: Lecanoromycetes
- Order: Teloschistales
- Family: Teloschistaceae
- Genus: Rusavskia
- Species: R. indica

Binomial name
- Rusavskia indica S.Y.Kondr. & Upreti (2017)

Species of lichen

Rusavskia indica is a species of both corticolous (bark-dwelling) and saxicolous (rock-dwelling) lichen in the family Teloschistaceae. Found in India, it was formally described as a new species in 2017 by the lichenologists Sergey Kondratyuk and Dalip Kumar Upreti. The type specimens were collected in Jammu-Kashmir.

The lichen has short and narrow lobes and funnel-like isidia that sometimes break off and leave bare spots on the substrate. If rhizines are present, they are simple (i.e., unbranched). In addition to the type locality, Rusavskia indica has been recorded from the Andaman Islands, Himachal Pradesh, and Uttarakhand. It is one of six Rusavskia species known to occur in India.
