= Conanthalictus macrops =

Scientific classification
- Kingdom: Animalia
- Phylum: Arthropoda
- Class: Insecta
- Order: Hymenoptera
- Family: Halictidae
- Genus: Conanthalictus
- Species: C. macrops

Binomial name
- Conanthalictus macrops Cockerell, 1916

Species of bee

Conanthalictus macrops is a species of sweat bee in the family Halictidae. It is found in North America.
