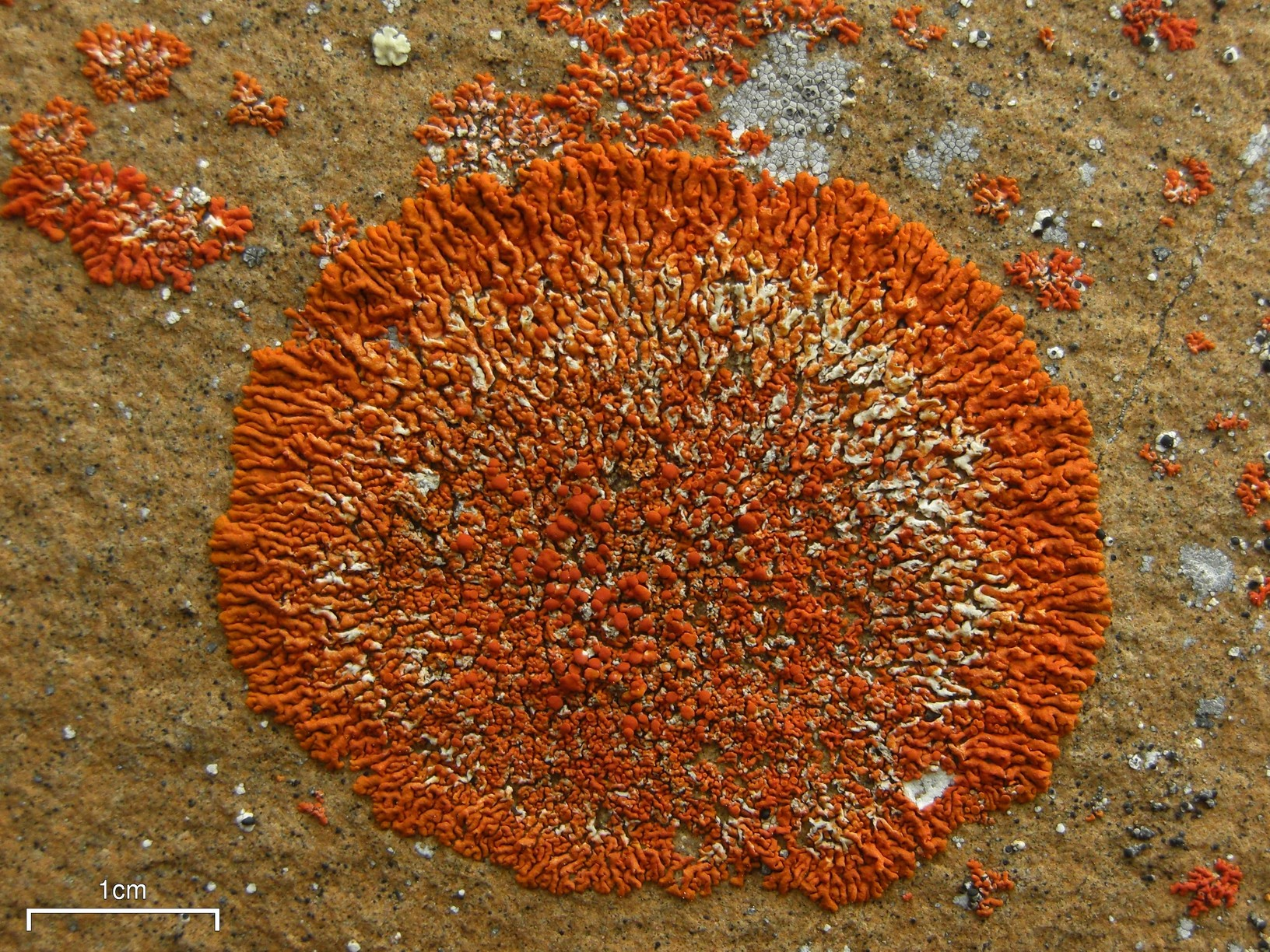
- Rusavskia elegans

Scientific classification
- Domain: Eukaryota
- Kingdom: Fungi
- Division: Ascomycota
- Class: Lecanoromycetes
- Order: Teloschistales
- Family: Teloschistaceae
- Genus: Rusavskia; S.Y.Kondr. & Kärnefelt (2003)

Type species
- Rusavskia elegans (Link) S.Y.Kondr. & Kärnefelt 2003

= Rusavskia =

Genus of lichens

Rusavskia is a genus of lichen-forming fungi in the family Teloschistaceae. It has 12 species. It is a member of the subfamily Xanthorioideae. The thallus of Rusavskia is characterised by its foliose (leaf-like) structure with distinct and typically narrow lobes that curve outwards.

== Taxonomy ==
The genus Rusavskia was proposed by lichenologists Sergey Kondratyuk and Ingvar Kärnefelt in 2003, with Rusavskia elegans assigned as the type species. The initial circumscription of the genus relied predominantly on an evaluation of morphological, anatomical and chemical characteristics, with a notable absence of molecular phylogenetic analysis. For this reason, the reception of the Rusavskia by lichenologists was initially met with cautious appraisal. As several molecular studies in the subsequent years showed, the Rusavskia elegans-group occupies a separate monophyletic branch in the Teloschistaceae; the growing body of molecular evidence led to the acceptance of the genus Rusavskia.

== Description ==
Rusavskia is characterised by its foliose (leaf-like) structure with distinct and typically narrow lobes that curve outwards. These lobes often feature pseudocyphellae – tiny, white porous areas on the lichen's surface. The lichen adheres to surfaces using short, root-like structures called hapters. Its reproductive structures, known as apothecia, are zeorine in form and display a noticeable orange hue. The ascospores produced are ellipsoid in shape, and polaridiblastic, with a moderately divided central region (septa). Additionally, Rusavskia may possess pycnidia, which are embedded reproductive structures, and produce ellipsoid-shaped conidia (asexual spores).

Rusavskia was distinguished from Xanthoria due to several unique characteristics. Unlike Xanthoria, Rusavskia has a mesodermate paraplectenchymatous cortex, which contrasts the earlier belief of it being scleroplectenchymatous. While it was believed to lack attachment organs, it was later found that species like R. elegans and R. sorediata have hapters, albeit short ones. The conidia (asexual spores) of Rusavskia are primarily ellipsoid, with only a minority being bacilliform, contrary to earlier descriptions.

In terms of morphology, Rusavskia predominantly differs from Xanthoria by its narrower lobes. When compared to Dufourea, Rusavskia stands out due to its narrow lobes that adhere more closely to surfaces. Although some experts hesitated to accept the distinct classification of Rusavskia, genetic evidence firmly sets it apart from Xanthoria and other related groups.

== Species ==
As of September 2023, Species Fungorum (in the Catalogue of Life) accepts 12 species of Rusavskia.

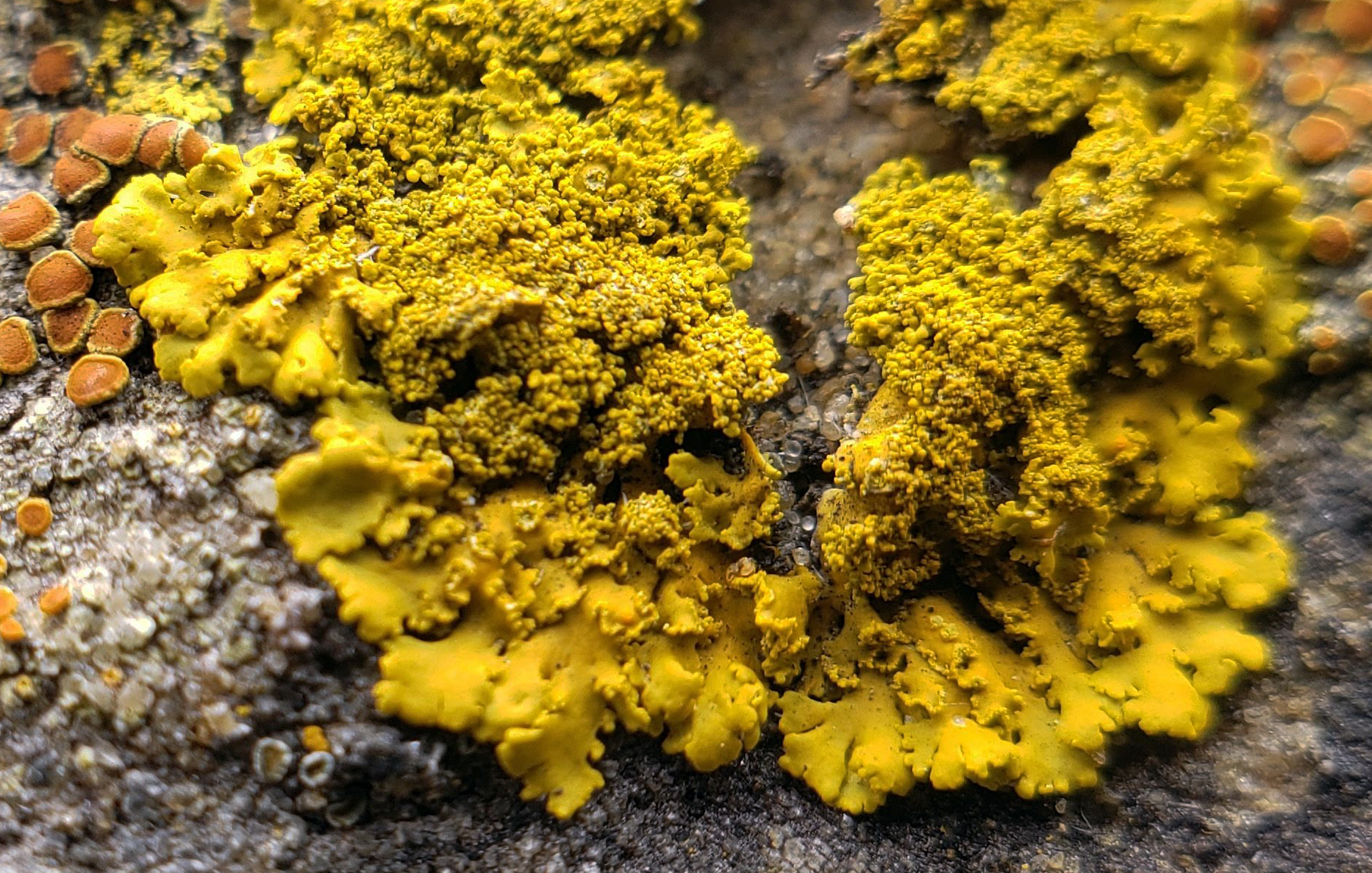
Rusavskia sorediata

- Rusavskia aspera (Savicz) S.Y.Kondr. & Kärnefelt (2015)
- Rusavskia crassa (Malme) S.Y.Kondr. & Kärnefelt (2003)
- Rusavskia dasanensis S.Y.Kondr., Galanina & Hur (2013)
- Rusavskia drevlyanica S.Y.Kondr. & O.O.Orlov (2020)
- Rusavskia ectaniza (Boistel) S.Y.Kondr. & Kärnefelt (2015)
- Rusavskia elegans (Link) S.Y.Kondr. & Kärnefelt (2003)
- Rusavskia granulifera (Giralt, Nimis & Poelt) S.Y.Kondr. & Kärnefelt (2003)
- Rusavskia hafellneri (S.Y.Kondr. & Kärnefelt) S.Y.Kondr. & Kärnefelt (2003)
- Rusavskia indica S.Y.Kondr. & Upreti (2017)
- Rusavskia indochinensis S.Y.Kondr., G.K.Mishra, S.Nayaka & D.K.Upreti (2020)
- Rusavskia sorediata (Vain.) S.Y.Kondr. & Kärnefelt (2003)
- Rusavskia subfruticulosa (Elenkin) S.Y.Kondr. & Kärnefelt (2003)
- Rusavskia upretii S.Y.Kondr., G.K.Mishra & Nayaka (2017)
