= Basket willow =

Basket willow is a common name for several plants and may refer to:

- Salix purpurea, native to Europe and western Asia
- Salix viminalis
