= Drevlians Nature Reserve =

Nature reserve in Zhytomyr Oblast, Ukraine

- Ukrainian: Древлянський природний заповідник
- IUCN category Ia (strict nature reserve)
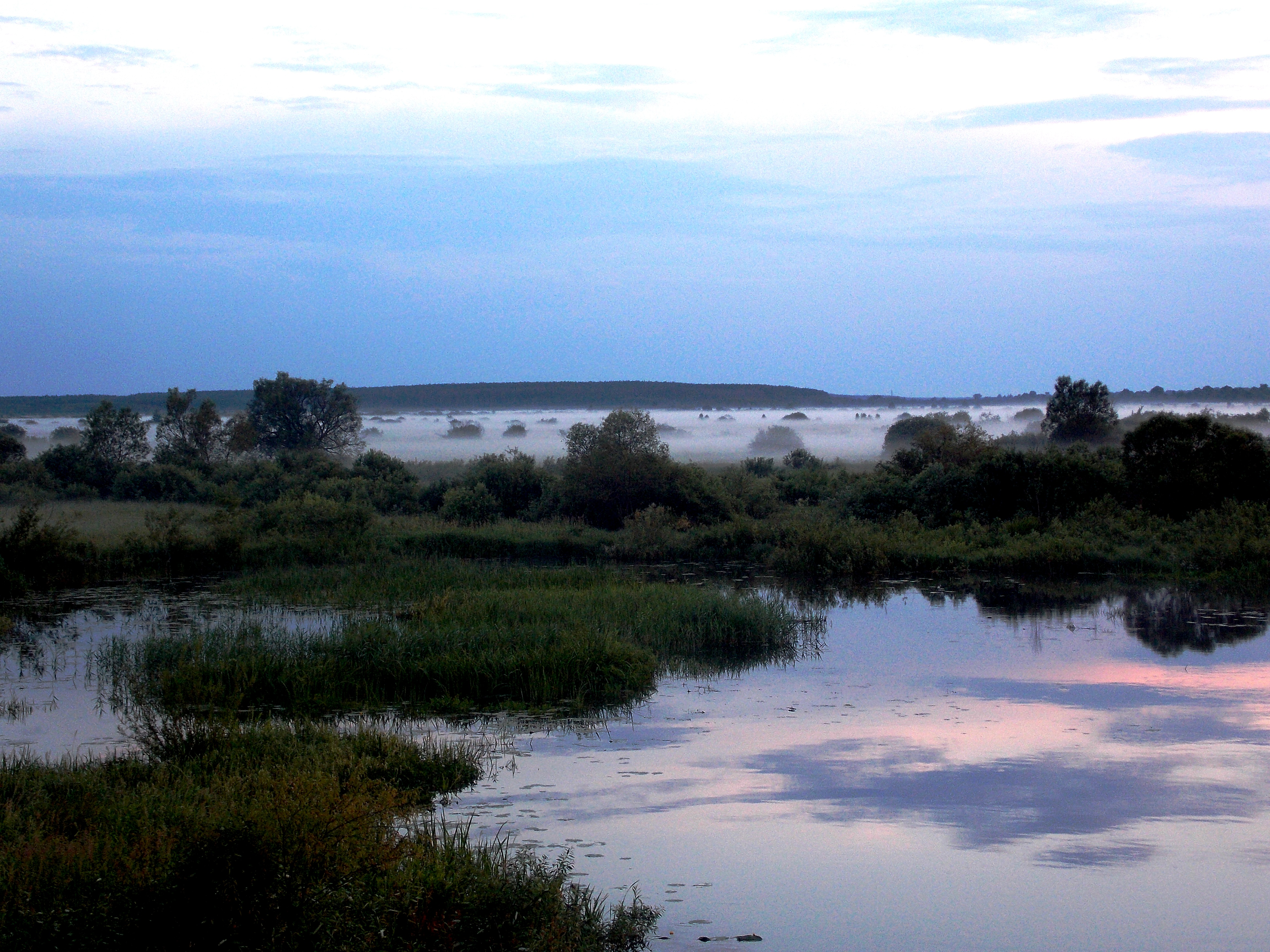
- Drevlians Nature Reserve

- Location within Ukraine
- Location: Zhytomyr Oblast, Narodychi Raion
- Nearest city: Narodychi
- Coordinates: 51°12′10″N 29°04′53″E
- Area: 30,872.84 hectares (76,288 acres; 309 km^{2}; 119 sq mi)
- Established: 2009
- Governing body: Ministry of Ecology and Natural Resources (Ukraine)
- Website: http://drevlyansky.in.ua/

The Drevlians Nature Reserve (Ukrainian: Древлянський природний заповідник) is a strict nature reserve of Ukraine that follows along the Uzh River in the Polesia region of north-central Ukraine. Created to protect representative forests and wetlands of the Polesia region, the area experienced contamination from the Chernobyl disaster. The site is 80 km due west of Chernobyl. The reserve is in the administrative district of Narodychi in Zhytomyr Oblast

== Topography ==
The Polesie is a marshy region along the Prypiat River on the border between Ukraine and Belarus. The middle of the Uzh River runs along the northern border of the Drevlians Reserve, as it flows northeast to meet the Prypiat. Smaller tributaries run north through the reserve into the Uzh. The terrain is flat. The site is roughly rectangular, measuring about 15 kilometres (9.3 mi) by 25 kilometres (16 mi).

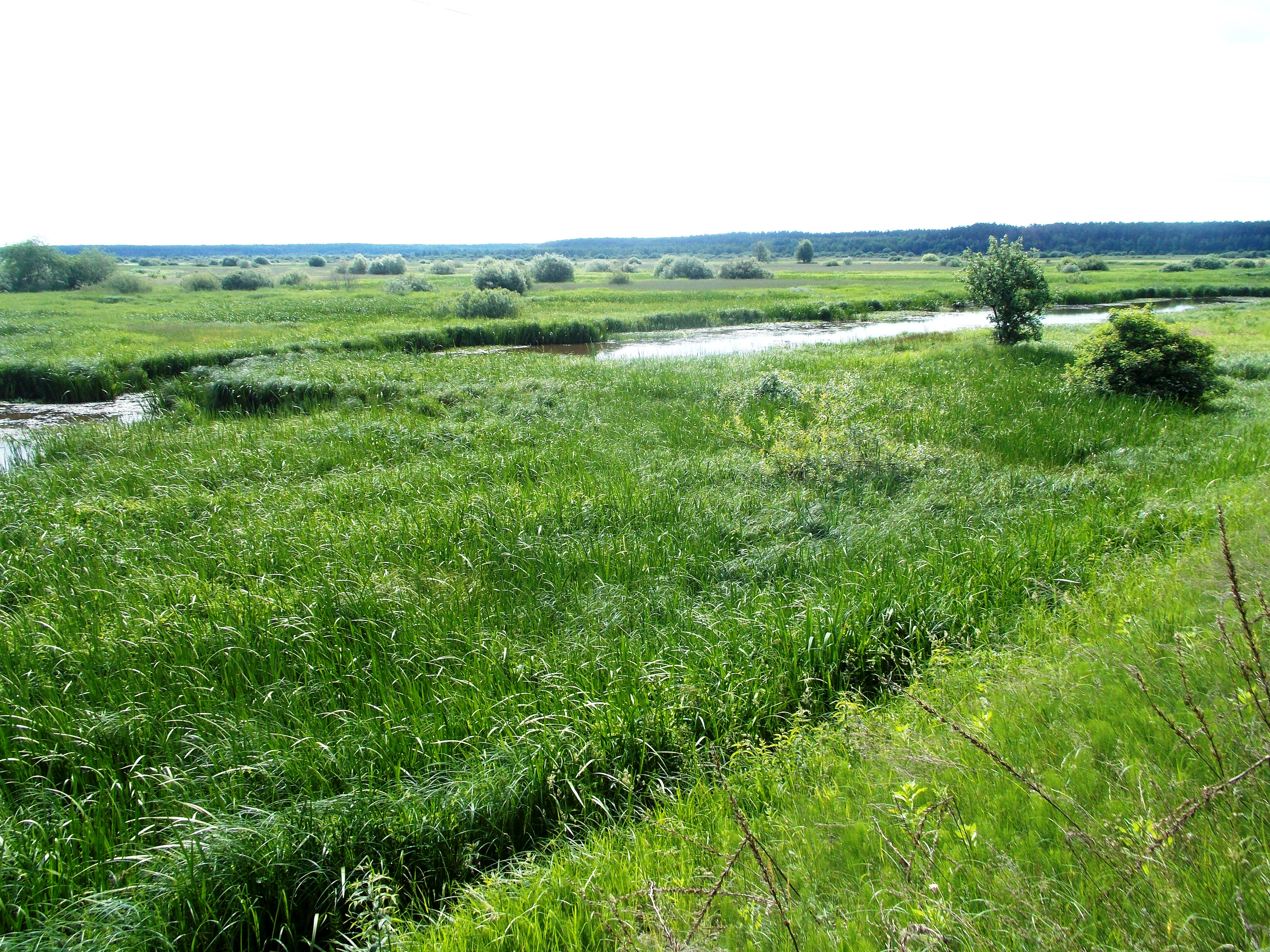
Floodplain bogs in Drevlians Reserve

== Climate and ecoregion ==
The climate of Drevlians is Humid continental climate, warm summer (Köppen climate classification (Dfb)). This climate is characterized by large seasonal temperature differentials and a warm summer (at least four months averaging over 10 °C (50 °F), but no month averaging over 22 °C (72 °F).

The reserve is located in the Central European mixed forests ecoregion, a temperate hardwood forest covering much of northeastern Europe, from Germany to Russia.

== Flora and fauna ==
Over half of the reserve is forested, with pine, oak, alder, birch, ash, aspen, and hornbeam dominating. Over 800 species of vascular plants have been recorded in the reserve, representing 56% of the species in the Ukrainian Polesi.

Over 500 species of fauna have been recorded in the reserve. The Drevlians Nature Reserve is home to lynx, wolf and elk.

== Public use ==
As a strict nature reserve, Drevlians' primary purpose is protection of nature and scientific study. Public access is limited: mass recreation and construction of facilities is prohibited as are hunting and fishing. Reserve staff conduct ecological excursions and educational sessions for local school children, and the scientific department hosts visiting researchers.

== See also ==
- Lists of Nature Preserves of Ukraine (class Ia protected areas)
- National Parks of Ukraine (class II protected areas)
