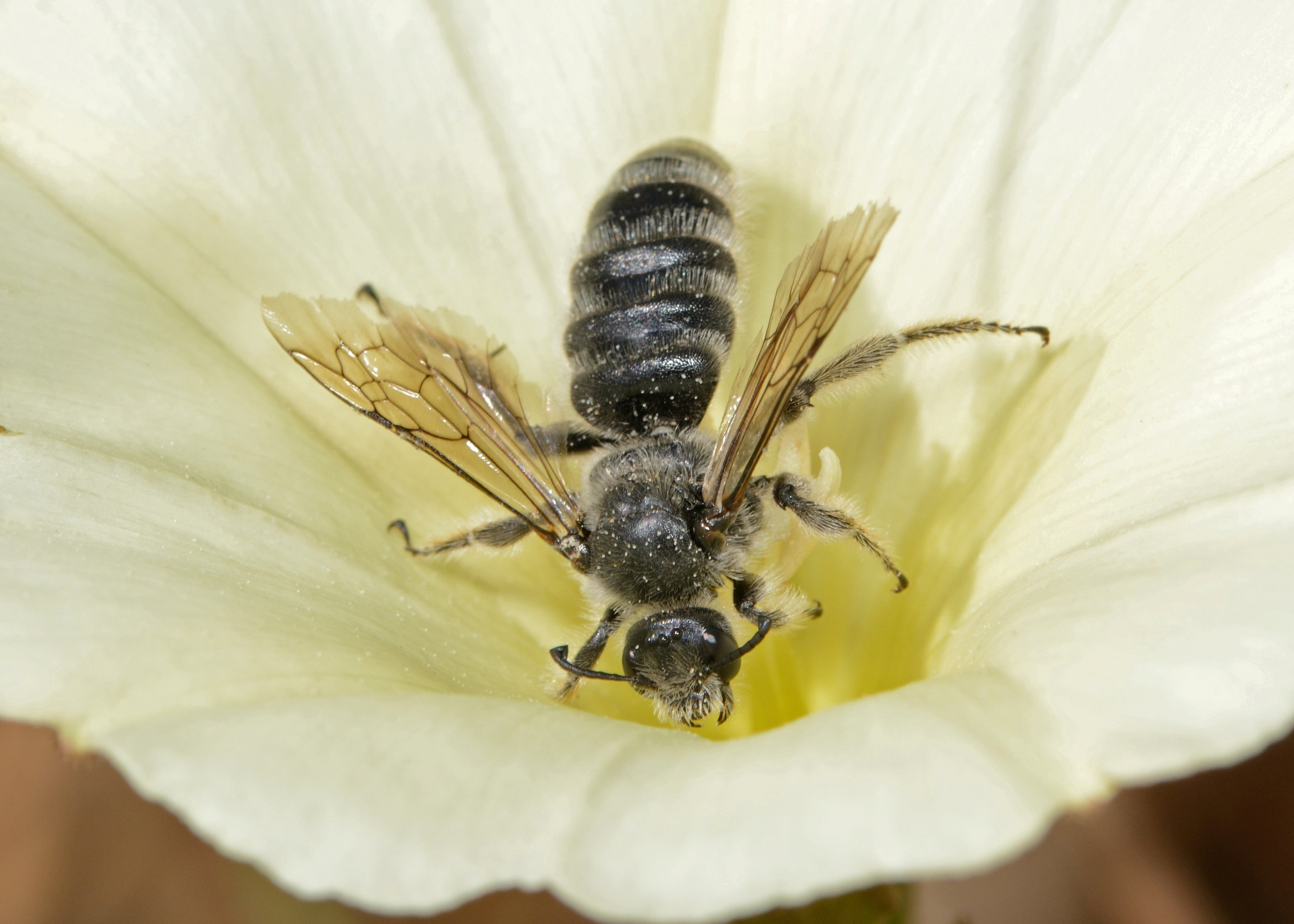
- Systropha planidens male

Scientific classification
- Kingdom: Animalia
- Phylum: Arthropoda
- Class: Insecta
- Order: Hymenoptera
- Family: Halictidae
- Subfamily: Rophitinae
- Genus: Systropha; Illiger, 1806

Species
- ~25 species

= Systropha =

Genus of bees

The genus Systropha comprises several species of Old World sweat bees, primarily specialist pollinators of plants in the genus Convolvulus. Males of the genus have unusual curled antennae, and females have pollen-carrying hairs covering almost the entire abdomen.

== Distribution ==
Systropha species occur from Spain and Morocco east to Tajikistan, and north as far as southern Germany. They occur in both eastern and western parts of Africa, south to Namibia. Asian species range as far south as Sri Lanka and Thailand.

== Life history ==
So far as is known, all species are oligolectic on flowers of Convolvulus, with unusual modifications of the scopa, such that almost the entire abdomen (including the dorsal surface) is used for carrying pollen, rather than the legs, as in most bees. Pollen is carried to nests in the ground, formed into pollen masses, on each of which a single egg is laid before the cell containing the pollen is sealed, and another cell is then constructed and provisioned.

== Species ==
Species according to Catalogue of Life:

- Systropha aethiopica Friese, 1911
- Systropha alfkeni (Brauns, 1926)
- Systropha androsthenes Baker, 1996
- Systropha arnoldi Friese, 1922
- Systropha bispinosa Friese, 1914
- Systropha curvicornis (Scopoli, 1770)
- Systropha diacantha Baker, 1996
- Systropha difformis Smith, 1879
- Systropha glabriventris Friese, 1922
- Systropha hirsuta Spinola, 1838
- Systropha inexspectata Ebmer, 1994
- Systropha iranica Popov, 1967
- Systropha kazakhstaniensis Patiny, 2004
- Systropha krigei Brauns, 1926
- Systropha macronasuta Strand, 1911
- Systropha maroccana Warncke, 1977
- Systropha martiali Patiny & Michez, 2007
- Systropha norae Patiny, 2004
- Systropha oti Patiny, Baldock & Michez, 2013
- Systropha pici Pérez, 1895
- Systropha planidens Giraud, 1861
- Systropha popovi Ponomareva, 1967
- Systropha punjabensis Batra & Michener, 1966
- Systropha rhodesiensis Friese, 1922
- Systropha ruficornis Morawitz, 1880
- Systropha sirikitae de Silva & Packer, 2016
- Systropha tadjika Warncke, 1992
- Systropha tropicalis Cockerell, 1911
- Systropha ugandensis Cockerell, 1931
- Systropha villosa Ebmer, 1978
