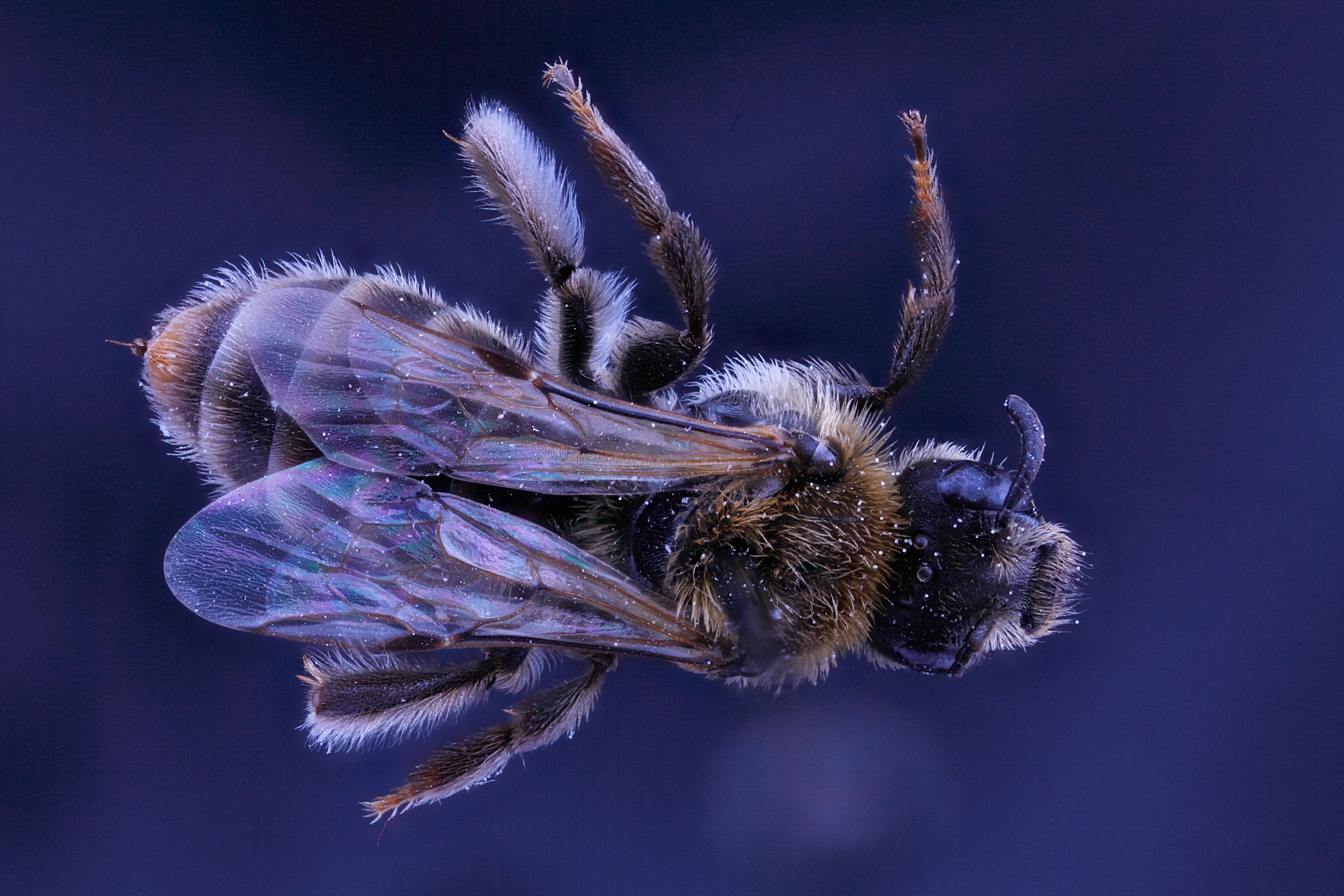
- Dufourea marginata

Scientific classification
- Kingdom: Animalia
- Phylum: Arthropoda
- Class: Insecta
- Order: Hymenoptera
- Family: Halictidae
- Subfamily: Rophitinae
- Genus: Dufourea; Lepeletier, 1841

= Dufourea =

Genus of bees

Dufourea is a genus of sweat bees in the family Halictidae. There are at least 160 described species in Dufourea. The bees are very uncommon. The bases of their antennae are well below the middle of their face and are only separated from the clypeus on the bottom of the face by not much more than the diameter of an antennal socket. The clypeus is short and wide, and the labrum is nearly as long as the clypeus. The species features a pre-episternal groove.

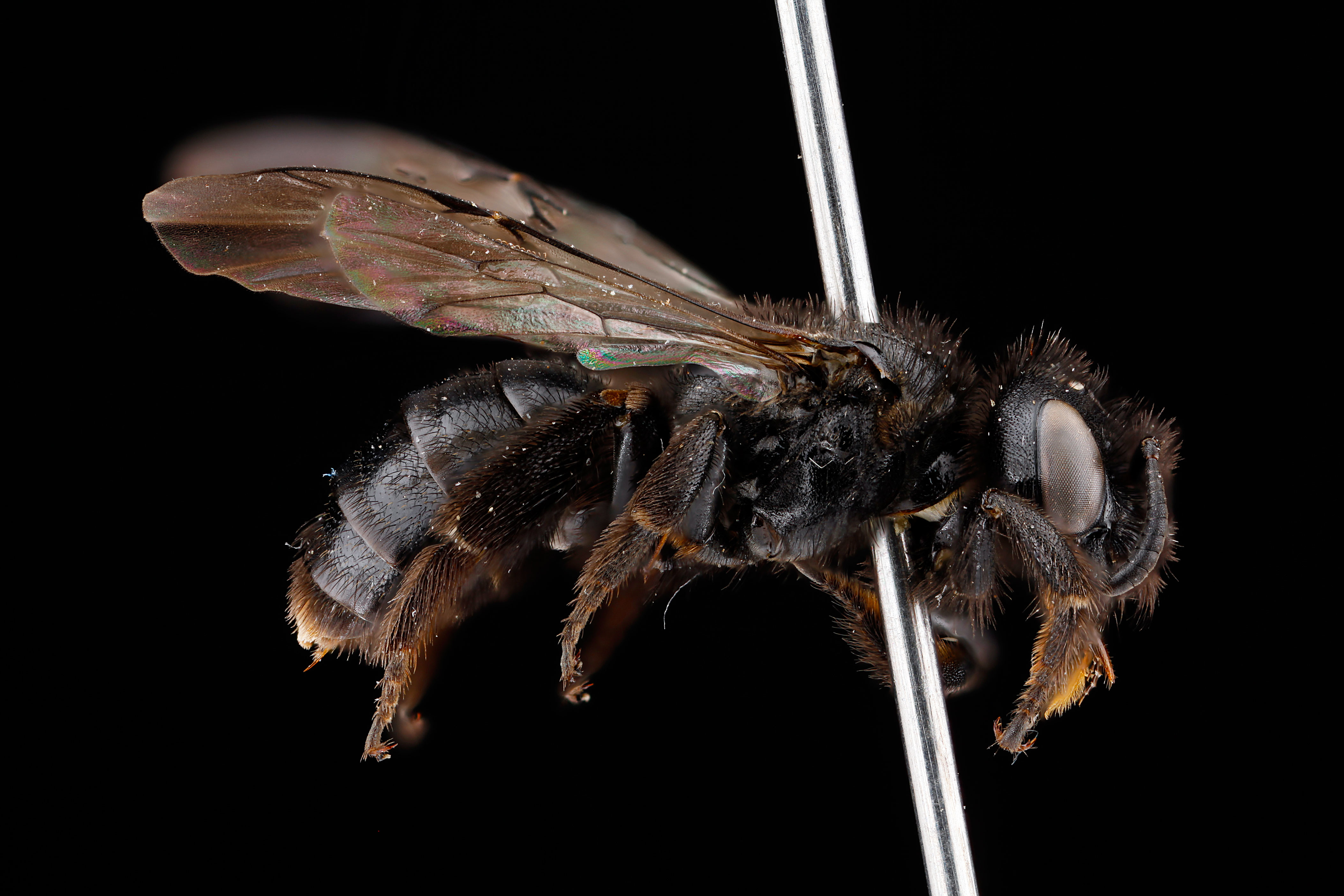
Dufourea maura

== See also ==
- List of Dufourea species
