= Basidiopycnides =

Scientific classification
- Kingdom: Fungi
- Division: Basidiomycota
- Class: Atractiellomycetes
- Order: Atractiellales
- Family: Phleogenaceae
- Genus: Basidiopycnides; J.Reid, Eyjólfsd. & Georg Hausner (2008)

Type species
- Basidiopycnides albertensis J.Reid, Eyjólfsd. & Georg Hausner (2008)

Genus of fungi

Basidiopycnides is a genus of fungi in the Phleogenaceae family. The genus is monotypic, containing the single species Basidiopycnides albertensis. The species was isolated from bark beetles collected in Banff National Park.
