= Dufourea africana =

Scientific classification
- Kingdom: Fungi
- Division: Ascomycota
- Class: Lecanoromycetes
- Order: Teloschistales
- Family: Teloschistaceae
- Genus: Dufourea
- Species: D. africana

Binomial name
- Dufourea africana (Almb.) Frödén, Arup & Søchting (2013)
- Holotype: Kisumu-Londiani, Kenya

Synonyms
- Xanthoria africana Almb. (1963)

Species of lichen

Dufourea africana is a species of corticolous (bark-dwelling), foliose lichen in the family Teloschistaceae. It occurs in Kenya and Uganda.

== Taxonomy ==
The lichen was first described by the Swedish lichenologist Ove Almborn in 1963, who classified it in the genus Xanthoria. The type specimen was collected in 1949 by the Dutch mycologist Rudolf Arnold Maas Geesteranus from the Tinderer Forest Reserve in Kisumu-Londiani (Kenya) at an elevation of 3,200 m (10,500 ft); there, it was found growing on an isolated and sun-exposed Podocarpus milanjianus. Patrik Frödén and colleagues transferred the taxon to the genus Dufourea in 2013, following a molecular phylogenetics-led reorganisation of the Teloschistaceae.

== Description ==
The lichen has an orange thallus that usually spreads irregularly on its substrate, with lobes up to 1 mm wide. The thallus surface has regions of soralia that are both laminal and marginal, and makes orange-coloured soredia; apothecia (fruiting bodies) have not been observed to occur in this species. The photobiont partners of the lichen are members of the green algal genus Trebouxia. They have roundish cells measuring about 10–15 μm, situated in an algal layer that is about 30–40 μm thick. Like most Teloschistaceae members, it contains parietin, a secondary metabolite (lichen product).

== Habitat and distribution ==
It occurs on the trunks of trees, particularly wayside and isolated ones, in open woodland and shrubland at elevations from 2,500 to 3,000 metres (8,200 to 9,800 ft). Found in Kenya and Uganda, it is considered an uncommon species.
