= Bourdotigloea =

Scientific classification
- Kingdom: Fungi
- Division: Basidiomycota
- Class: Atractiellomycetes
- Order: Atractiellales
- Family: Phleogenaceae
- Genus: Bourdotigloea; Aime (2018)

Type species
- Bourdotigloea vestita (Bourdot & Galzin) Aime (2018)

Genus of fungi

Bourdotigloea is a genus of fungi in the family Phleogenaceae. Basidiocarps (fruit bodies) are effused, waxy, and (microscopically) have unclamped hyphae, conspicuous cystidia, and basidia that are auricularioid (tubular and laterally septate). Some species were formerly referred to Helicogloea, but molecular research, based on cladistic analysis of DNA sequences, has shown that the two genera are distinct. Bourdotigloea currently contains 9 species. The genus is known from Europe and North America.

== Species ==
- Bourdotigloea cerea
- Bourdotigloea concisa
- Bourdotigloea dura
- Bourdotigloea grisea
- Bourdotigloea lanea
- Bourdotigloea longispora
- Bourdotigloea multifurcata
- Bourdotigloea sebacinoidea
