= Saccosoma =

Scientific classification
- Kingdom: Fungi
- Division: Basidiomycota
- Class: Atractiellomycetes
- Order: Atractiellales
- Family: Phleogenaceae
- Genus: Saccosoma; Spirin (2018)

Type species
- Saccosoma farinaceum (Höhn.) Spirin & K. Põldmaa (2018)

Genus of fungi

Saccosoma is a genus of fungi in the family Phleogenaceae. Basidiocarps (fruit bodies) are corticioid, and (microscopically) have unclamped hyphae and basidia that are auricularioid (tubular and laterally septate). Some species were formerly referred to as Helicogloea (distinguished by its gelatinous fruit bodies), but molecular research, based on cladistic analysis of DNA sequences, has shown that the two genera are distinct. Saccosoma currently contains 7 species. The genus occurs in both temperate and tropical regions.

== Species ==
- Saccosoma album
- Saccosoma contortum
- Saccosoma floccosum
- Saccosoma globisporum
- Saccosoma medium
- Saccosoma sphaerosporum
