= Proceropycnis =

Scientific classification
- Kingdom: Fungi
- Division: Basidiomycota
- Class: Atractiellomycetes
- Order: Atractiellales
- Family: Hoehnelomycetaceae
- Genus: Proceropycnis; M.Villarreal, Arenal, V.Rubio, Begerow, R.Bauer, R.Kirschner & Oberw. (2006)

Type species
- Proceropycnis pinicola M.Villarreal, Arenal, V.Rubio, Begerow, R.Bauer, R.Kirschner & Oberw. (2006)

Species
- Proceropycnis hameedii Proceropycnis pinicola

Genus of fungi

Proceropycnis is a genus of fungi in the family Hoehnelomycetaceae. The genus is known from Spain, North America, and east Asia.
