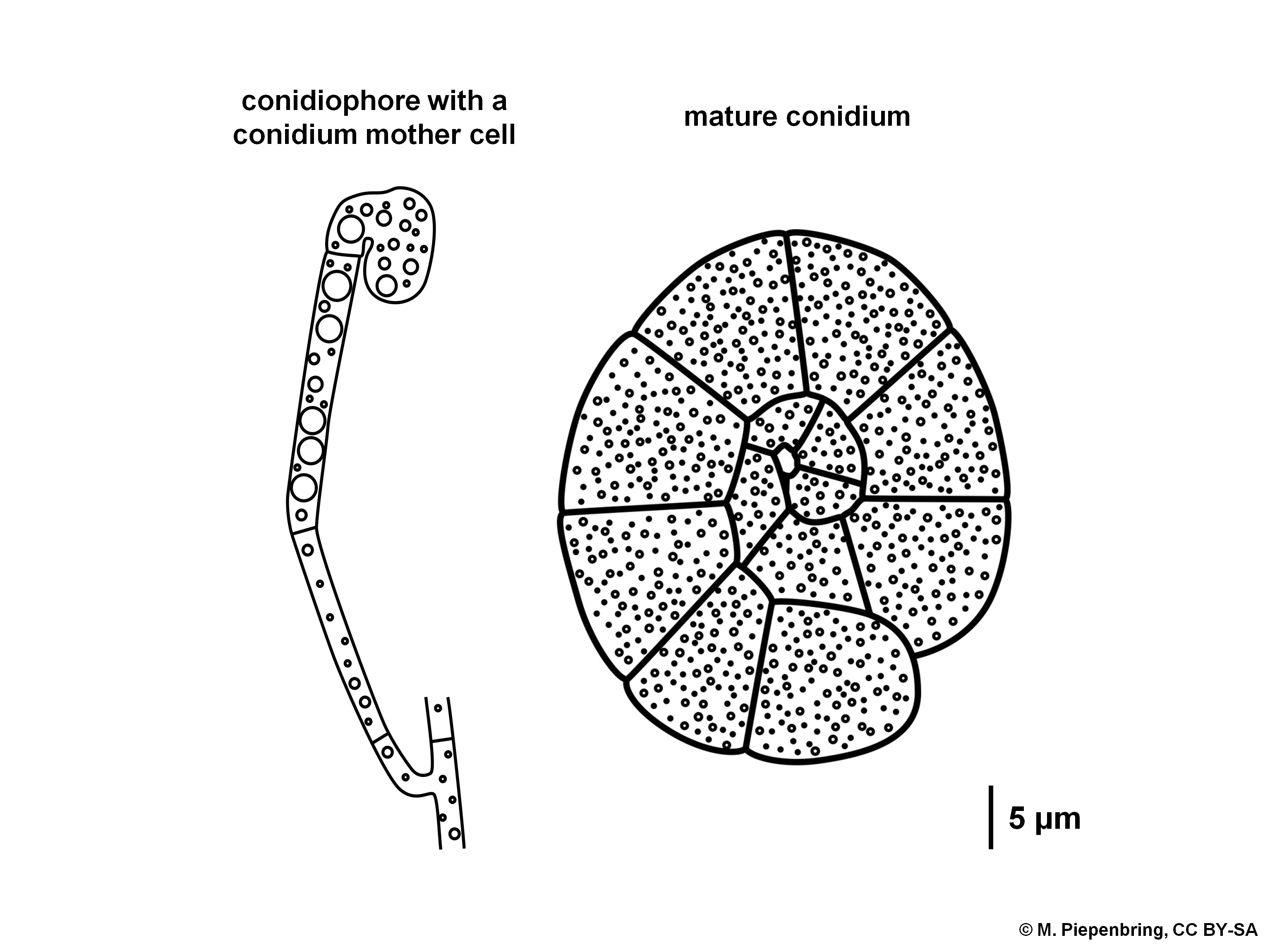
- Hobsonia mirabilis, drawing of conidiophore and coiled conidium

Scientific classification
- Kingdom: Fungi
- Division: Basidiomycota
- Class: Atractiellomycetes
- Order: Atractiellales
- Family: Phleogenaceae
- Genus: Hobsonia; Berk. ex Massee (1891)

Type species
- Hobsonia gigaspora Berk. ex Massee (1891)

= Hobsonia (fungus) =

Genus of fungi

Hobsonia is a genus of fungi in the family Phleogenaceae. The genus is currently monotypic, with a single recognized species, Hobsonia mirabilis. The type species, H. gigaspora, and H. ackermannii are considered to be synonyms and additional lichenicolous species have now been transferred to the ascomycete genera Hobsoniopsis and Illosporiopsis. Hobsonia mirabilis is only known in its anamorph form, which is whitish, gelatinous, pustular, and occurs on dead woody plant remains. Microscopically, it produces coiled or spiralled conidia. The species was formerly of uncertain disposition, but molecular research, based on cladistic analysis of DNA sequences, has shown that it belongs within the Atractiellales. Though originally described from New York, the species is more commonly found in the tropics and subtropics.
