= Teloschistopsis bonae-spei =

Scientific classification
- Domain: Eukaryota
- Kingdom: Fungi
- Division: Ascomycota
- Class: Lecanoromycetes
- Order: Teloschistales
- Family: Teloschistaceae
- Genus: Teloschistopsis
- Species: T. bonae-spei

Binomial name
- Teloschistopsis bonae-spei (Almb. & Poelt) Frödén, Arup & Søchting (2013)

Synonyms
- Caloplaca bonae-spei Almb. & Poelt (1984)

Species of lichen

Teloschistopsis bonae-spei is a species of saxicolous (rock-dwelling), fruticose lichen in the family Teloschistaceae. It occurs in South Africa, where it grows on maritime and coastal rocks.

== Taxonomy ==
It was first formally described as a new species in 1984 by the lichenologists Ove Almborn and Josef Poelt, who initially classified it in the genus Caloplaca. The type specimen of Teloschistopsis bonae-spei was collected in South Africa, specifically within the Cape Province on the Cape Peninsula, in the district of Simon's Town. The precise location was the Cape of Good Hope reserve at Olifantsbos on the west coast. Here, the lichen was found growing on sandstone banks, which rise up to 2 metres high, situated in the immediate coastal area. The collection was made from somewhat sheltered locations on more or less vertical surfaces.

Patrik Frödén and colleagues transferred the taxon to the genus Teloschistopsis in 2013, following a molecular phylogenetics-led reorganisation of the Teloschistaceae.

== Description ==
Teloschistopsis bonae-spei predominantly grows on rocks devoid of calcite. It forms expansive colonies characterised by both flat and three-dimensional structures. The thallus (body of the lichen) displays a range of yellow to yellow-orange coloured lobes, measuring up to 5 mm in length and between 0.3 and 1 mm in width. These lobes, found at the periphery, are tightly to loosely attached to the substrate, have irregular branching, and may overlap each other. On older parts of these marginal lobes, numerous pseudocyphellae (tiny, porous spots that facilitate gas exchange) are present. Moving towards the centre of the thallus, the lobes can be similar in adherence to the substrate or can rise up, forming a loose, shrub-like layer that stands over the crusty base of the thallus. These ascending lobes are variably flat to significantly compressed and range from 0.5 to 3 mm in width. In mature lobes, the cortex layer, which covers the surface, may crack longitudinally creating long strips filled with pseudocyphellae, mirroring the coloration of the marginal lobes.

Apothecia (fruiting bodies) are distributed sporadically and can be abundant on certain lobes. They are borne on the upper side or terminally on the lobes, and have flat to slightly convex, brownish-yellow-orange discs. Initially, these discs are encircled by a protruding thalline margin}, which soon transitions into a narrow proper margin and a more retracted, wart-divided thalline margin. The underside of these fruiting bodies is also covered with numerous pseudocyphellae.

The structure within these lobes is dorsiventral, meaning they have differentiated upper and lower surfaces. The upper side, barring the pseudocyphellae, is sealed with a continuous network of scleroplectenchymatic filaments (thick-walled, supportive tissue), while the underside is more irregularly structured. The medulla, or innermost layer of the thallus, in areas not occupied by filament networks, contains clusters of granular, colourless to ochre deposits.

The apothecium excipulum (supporting layer of the fruiting body) mirrors the irregular structure of the thallus, lacking a distinct amphithecium (outer layer of tissue around the apothecium). The hymenium (spore-producing layer) is about 70–80 μm high, with paraphyses (filamentous cells in the hymenium) that are 1.5–2 μm thick, expanding up to 5 μm at the capitate (club-like) terminal cells. Some paraphyses transform into oil paraphyses, usually containing one or two oil cells. The spores are narrow to broadly ellipsoid, measuring about 11.5–16 μm by 5.5–7.5 μm, with septa approximately 2.5–5 μm thick.
