= Xanthoria kangarooensis =

Scientific classification
- Kingdom: Fungi
- Division: Ascomycota
- Class: Lecanoromycetes
- Order: Teloschistales
- Family: Teloschistaceae
- Genus: Xanthoria
- Species: X. kangarooensis

Binomial name
- Xanthoria kangarooensis S.Y.Kondr. & Kärnefelt (2009)

Synonyms
- Jackelixia kangarooensis (S.Y.Kondr. & Kärnefelt) S.Y.Kondr., Fedorenko, S.Stenroos, Kärnefelt & A.Thell (2009)

Species of lichen

Xanthoria kangarooensis is a species of corticolous (bark-dwelling), crustose lichen in the family Teloschistaceae. Found in Australia, it was formally described as a new species in 2009 by lichenologists Sergey Kondratyuk and Ingvar Kärnefelt. The type specimen was collected from East Kangaroo Island (Furneaux Group, Bass Strait), where it was found growing on dead Lycium ferocissimum shrubs. Other associated lichens include species of Pyxine, Ramalina, and Rinodina. The species epithet kangarooensis refers to its type locality, the only place the lichen is known to occur. Kondratyuk and colleagues proposed to transfer the taxon to the newly circumscribed Jackelixia in 2009, but this genus has not been widely accepted by other authorities.
