= List of botanical gardens in Sweden =

List of notable botanical gardens and arboreta in Sweden

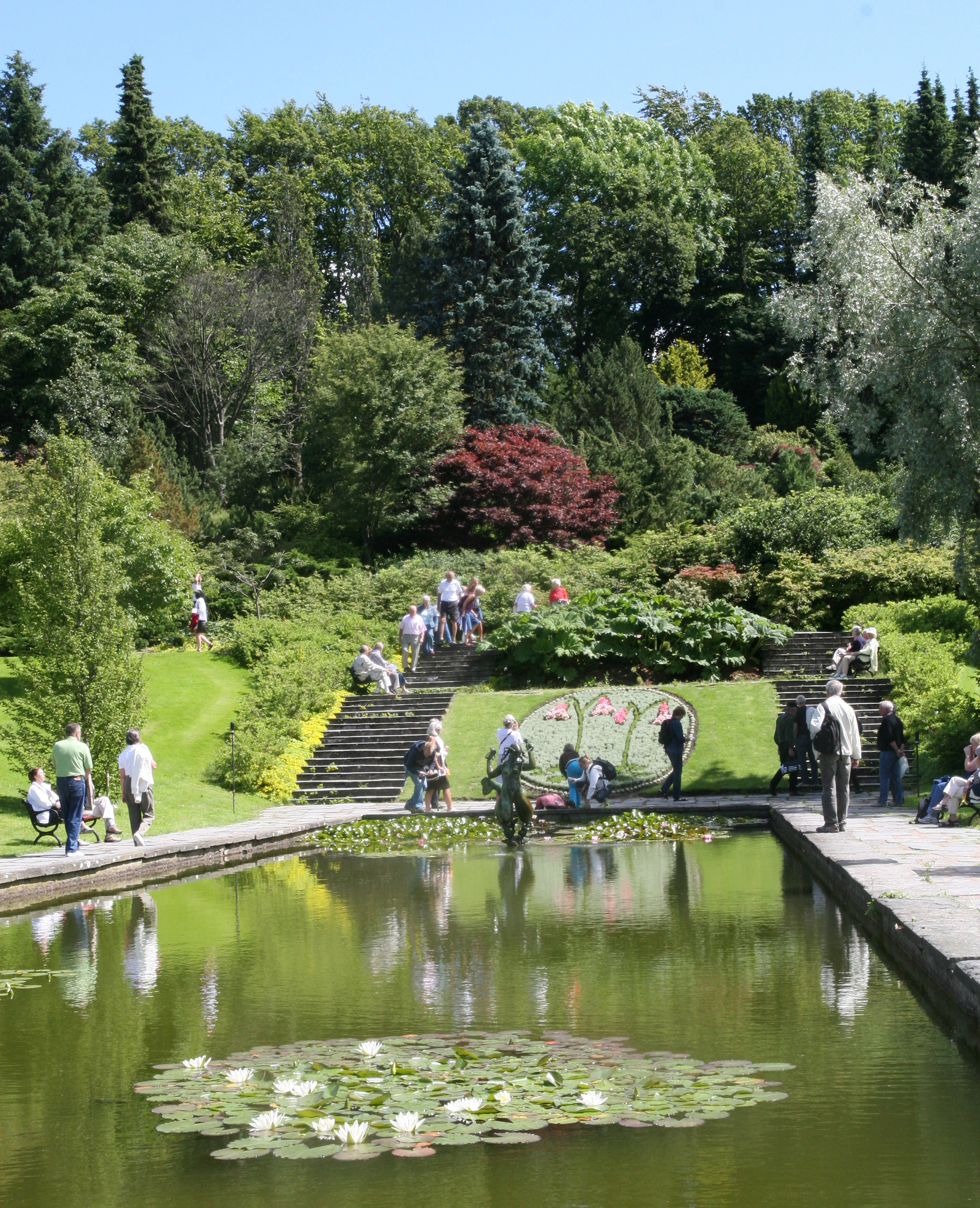
Gothenburg Botanical Garden

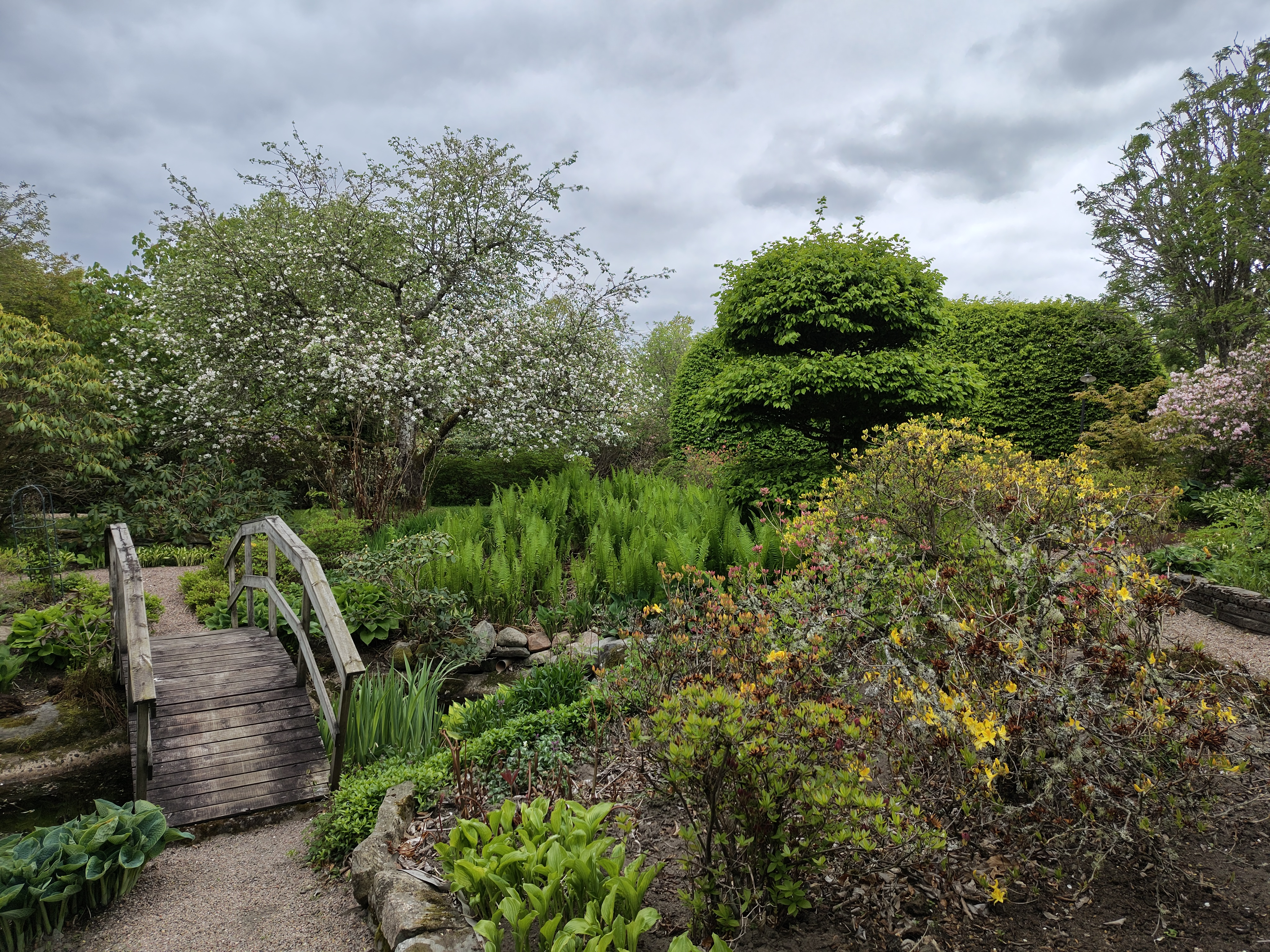
Kärrhults Gård, a botanical garden in Småland

Botanical gardens in Sweden feature collections of living plants for research, education, and conservation. While some focus on native and endemic Swedish species, most include plants from around the world. These gardens and arboreta are found across Sweden, administered by universities, local governments, and occasionally private entities.

Five of the listed gardens are members of the Swedish Network of Botanical Gardens (SNBG), a collaborative network of botanical gardens and arboreta that maintain documented collections of living plants for scientific research, conservation, outreach, and education.

This list includes notable botanical gardens and arboreta in Sweden, most of which are registered in the BGCI Garden Search database. These gardens are important centers for collecting rare and endangered species, educating the public about plant science, horticulture, and biological diversity, while also offering enjoyable and relaxing visits. Gardens are listed alphabetically, providing:

1. Garden name
2. Managing organization
3. Location (city)
4. Number of plant species (when available)

The botanical gardens and arboretums are as follows:

- Alnarpsparken, Swedish University of Agricultural Sciences, Alnarp.
- Bergianska trädgården, Stockholm University, Stockholm. 9000 species.
- Fredriksdal Museums and Gardens, Helsingborg Municipality, Helsingborg.
- Göteborg Botanical Garden, Västra Götaland Regional Council, Gothenburg. 16000 species outdoors, 4000 species indoors.
- The Knowledge Garden, Swedish University of Agricultural Sciences, Uppsala. 1500 species.
- The Linnaean Gardens, Uppsala University, Uppsala. 7000 species.
- Lund Botanical Garden, Lund University, Lund. 7000 species outdoors, 2000 species indoors.
- Visby Botanical Garden, Society of Bathing Friends (Swedish: Sällskapet De Badande Wännerna), Visby.
