= Dufourea angustata =

Scientific classification
- Kingdom: Fungi
- Division: Ascomycota
- Class: Lecanoromycetes
- Order: Teloschistales
- Family: Teloschistaceae
- Genus: Dufourea
- Species: D. angustata

Binomial name
- Dufourea angustata (S.Y.Kondr. & Kärnefelt) Frödén, Arup & Søchting (2013)
- Holotype site: South of Batemans Bay, New South Wales

Synonyms
- Xanthoria angustata S.Y.Kondr. & Kärnefelt (2009); Jackelixia angustata (S.Y.Kondr. & Kärnefelt) S.Y.Kondr., Fedorenko, S.Stenroos, Kärnefelt & A.Thell (2009)

Species of lichen

Dufourea angustata is a species of saxicolous (rock-dwelling), crustose lichen in the family Teloschistaceae. It is widely distributed across Australia.

== Taxonomy ==
The lichen was formally described in 2009 by the lichenologists Sergey Kondratyuk and Ingvar Kärnefelt; they initially placed it as a member of genus Xanthoria. The type specimen was collected by the authors from rocky outcrops south of Batemans Bay in New South Wales. The species epithet angustata, derived from the Latin angustatus ("narrow"), alludes to the shape of the thallus lobes.

== Description ==
Dufourea angustata is a lichen that typically forms a reddish-orange to brick orange thallus, spanning 2–3 cm in width. It features narrow and distinct lobes that often interconnect to form a net-like pattern. These lobes are usually 0.4–1 (up to 1.2) mm wide and 5–6 mm long, with frequent and irregular branching. Including the secondary lobules, the lobes can reach up to 3.5 mm in width.

The apothecia of Dufourea angustata are small, measuring 0.5–1 mm in diameter. Initially, they appear flat and lecanorine (with a thalline margin) and later become slightly convex and biatorine (without a thalline margin). The apothecia are stipitate (having a stalk-like base) and constricted at the base. The cortex of the thalline exciple (the outer layer of the apothecium) is composed of densely packed, palisade-like cells and is up to 15 μm thick. The true exciple (the inner tissue layer of the apothecium) has a well-developed matrix, ranging from mesodermatous paraplectenchymatous to somewhat pseudoprosoplectenchymatous in structure. The hymenium, or spore-bearing layer, is very pale yellow and measures up to 65 μm in height. The subhymenium is about 15 μm thick.

The paraphyses (filamentous structures in the hymenium) often have one or two uppermost cells containing oil droplets or oil cells and widen to about 5–6 μm in diameter. The asci (spore-bearing cells) typically contain eight spores. The ascospores are small and ellipsoid, measuring 7–12 by 5.5–6 μm, with a relatively narrow septum of about 3–4 μm.

== Habitat and distribution ==
Dufourea angustata is predominantly found in the coastal regions of Australia. It thrives on exposed and water-washed rocks such as schists, basalt, rhyolite, quartzite, and granite, particularly on outcrops and pebbles along the shoreline. Though less frequently, it can also be found on calcareous or limestone sea-cliffs and occasionally on man-made structures. It is rare for this species to grow on bark or dead wood, but such occurrences have been noted, for example, on the dead wood of Leptecophylla juniperina and the bark of dead Albizia lophantha.

In its natural habitats, Dufourea angustata often coexists with other lichen species such as Xanthoria ligulata, Filsoniana kiamae, and various members of the Parmeliaceae, as well as other foliose lichens. This species is sometimes affected by lichenicolous fungi including Arthonia sytnikii, Pyrenidium actinellum, and Stigmidium species.

Dufourea angustata is widely distributed across several regions in Australia, including Western Australia, New South Wales, South Australia, Victoria, and Tasmania.
