= Basidiopycnis =

Scientific classification
- Kingdom: Fungi
- Division: Basidiomycota
- Class: Atractiellomycetes
- Order: Atractiellales
- Family: Hoehnelomycetaceae
- Genus: Basidiopycnis; Oberw., R.Kirschner, R.Bauer, Begerow & Arenal (2006)

Type species
- Basidiopycnis hyalina Oberw., R.Kirschner, R.Bauer, Begerow & Arenal (2006)

Synonyms
- Basidiopycnides J. Reid, Eyjólfsd. & Georg Hausner (2008)

Genus of fungi

Basidiopycnis is a fungal genus in the family Hoehnelomycetaceae. The genus is monotypic, containing the single species Basidiopycnis hyalina. The species forms minute pycnidial basidiocarps (fruit bodies) in bark beetle tunnels. Teleomorphs produce auricularioid (laterally septate) basidia, whilst anamorphs produce asexual conidia. Basidiopycnis hyalina was described from Germany and is also known from Italy and Switzerland. Anamorphic fruit bodies collected in Canada were given the name Basidiopycnides albertensis, but are currently considered conspecific with the European species.
