= Mycogelidium =

Scientific classification
- Kingdom: Fungi
- Division: Ascomycota
- Class: Dothideomycetes
- Order: Capnodiales
- Genus: Mycogelidium W.Y. Zhuang (2007)

Type species
- Mycogelidium sinense W.Y. Zhuang (2007)

Genus of fungi

Mycogelidium is a genus of fungi in the order Capnodiales. It contains the single species Mycogelidium sinense, described from China. The species was originally misinterpreted as a basidiomycete in the order Atractiellales and placed in its own family, the Mycogelidiaceae. Septate conidiophores were mistaken for auricularioid (laterally septate) basidia. The species is now considered to belong within the anamorphic Capnodiales (sooty moulds).
