= Atractiella =

Scientific classification
- Kingdom: Fungi
- Division: Basidiomycota
- Class: Atractiellomycetes
- Order: Atractiellales
- Family: Hoehnelomycetaceae
- Genus: Atractiella; Sacc. (1886)

Type species
- Atractiella brunaudiana (Sacc.) Sacc. (1886)

Species
- A. brunaudiana A. columbiana A. delectans A. macrospora A. muscigena A. rhizophila A. solani

Synonyms
- Hoehnelomyces Weese (1920); Hoehnelomycopsis Greis (1937)

Genus of fungi

Atractiella is a genus of fungi in the family Hoehnelomycetaceae. The widespread genus contains seven species. Basidiocarps (fruit bodies) are minute and stilboid (pin-shaped) Microscopically they produce auricularioid (laterally septate) basidia. Molecular research, based on cladistic analysis of DNA sequences, has shown that the genus is monophyletic (a natural grouping).
