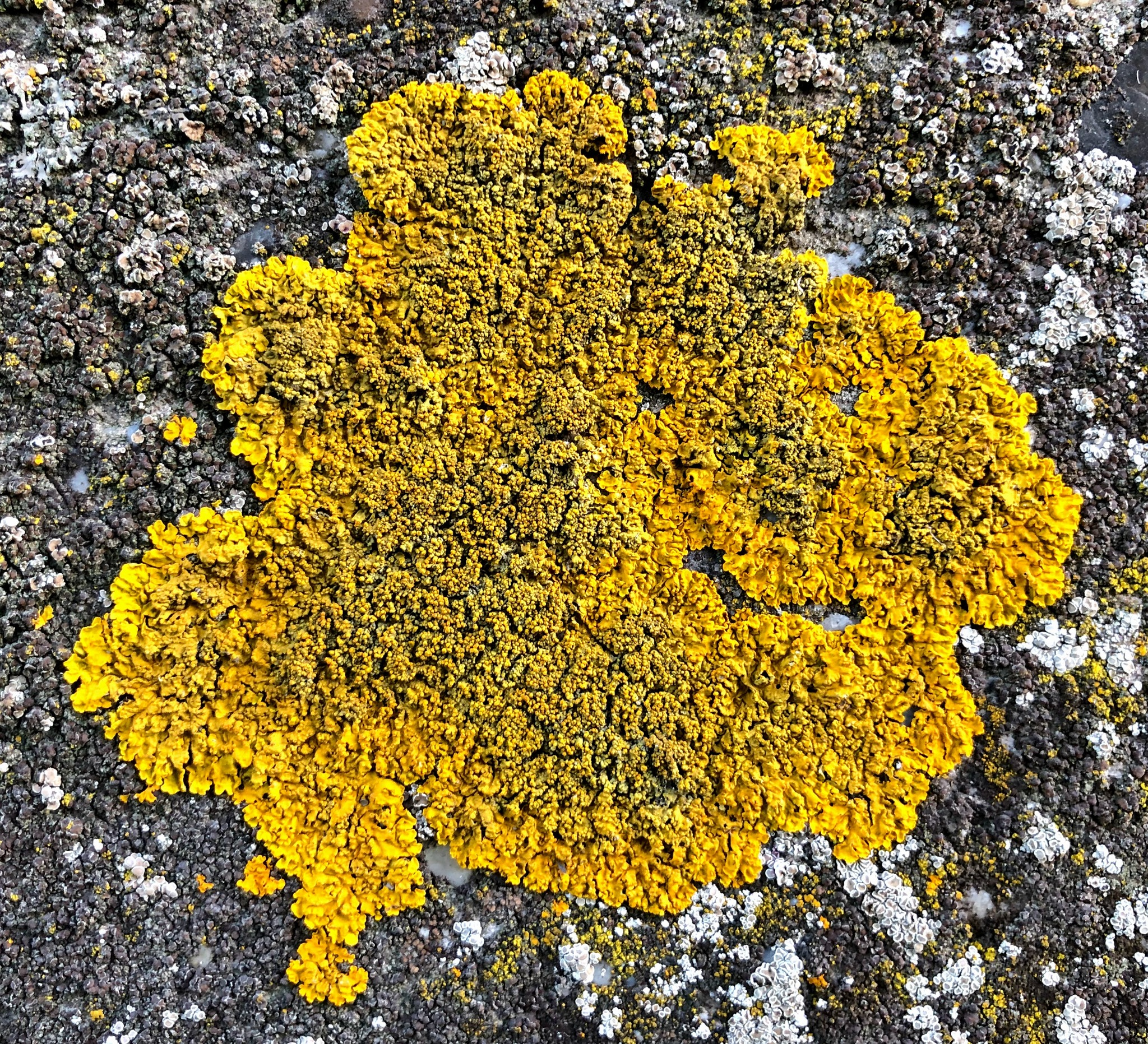

Scientific classification
- Kingdom: Fungi
- Division: Ascomycota
- Class: Lecanoromycetes
- Order: Teloschistales
- Family: Teloschistaceae
- Genus: Xanthoria
- Species: X. calcicola

Binomial name
- Xanthoria calcicola Oxner (1937)

Synonyms
- Physcia parietina f. congranulata Cromb. (1894); Teloschistes parietinus f. congranulatus (Cromb.) G.Merr. (1914); Xanthoria aureola f. congranulata (Cromb.) Erichsen (1930); Xanthoria parietina f. congranulata (Cromb.) B.de Lesd. (1931); Xanthoria parietina subsp. calcicola (Oxner) Clauzade & Cl.Roux (1985)

= Xanthoria calcicola =

Species of lichen

Xanthoria calcicola is a species of saxicolous and corticolous (rock- and bark-dwelling), crustose lichen in the family Teloschistaceae.

== Taxonomy ==
The lichen was formally described as a new species in 1937 by the Ukrainian lichenologist Alfred Oxner. Molecular analysis published in 1998 confirmed the genetic distinctiveness between Xanthoria calcicola and Xanthoria parietina.

== Distribution ==
Xanthoria calcicola is found in the southern temperate region of Europe, with its distribution range stretching from southern Scandinavia south to the Mediterranean Basin. Its presence extends eastward from Great Britain, reaching as far as Ukraine and various regions in the Middle East. The lichen grows primarily on stone, but is also frequently found growing on bark. A study conducted in Sweden found that X. calcicola typically does not prefer trees as habitats and only colonises them when they are near an existing population on a wall.

== Species interactions ==
Several species of lichenicolous (lichen-dwelling) fungi are known to parasitise Xanthoria calcicola, including: Didymocyrtis slaptoensis, Pyrenochaeta xanthoriae, Didymocyrtis cf. consimilis, Erythricium aurantiacum, and Illosporiopsis christiansenii.

== Biomonitoring ==
A 2016 study investigated the metal and metalloid content in Xanthoria calcicola collected from the Syracusan petrochemical complex in Sicily, revealing high concentrations of elements like arsenic, chromium, nickel, and vanadium, indicative of environmental stress in the area. The use of multi-element statistical analysis and enrichment factors in the study demonstrated the effectiveness of Xanthoria calcicola as a bioindicator in highly industrialized environments, suggesting its potential application as a bioindicator in other industrial contexts.
