= Xanthoria yorkensis =

Scientific classification
- Kingdom: Fungi
- Division: Ascomycota
- Class: Lecanoromycetes
- Order: Teloschistales
- Family: Teloschistaceae
- Genus: Xanthoria
- Species: X. yorkensis

Binomial name
- Xanthoria yorkensis S.Y.Kondr. & Kärnefelt (2009)

Synonyms
- Jackelixia yorkensis (S.Y.Kondr. & Kärnefelt) S.Y.Kondr., Fedorenko, S.Stenroos, Kärnefelt & A.Thell (2009)

Species of lichen

Xanthoria yorkensis is a species of corticolous (bark-dwelling), crustose lichen in the family Teloschistaceae. Found in South Australia, it was formally described as a new species in 2009 by lichenologists Sergey Kondratyuk and Ingvar Kärnefelt. The type specimen, collected along the Maitland road in Yorke Peninsula, was found growing on Melaleuca trees in mallee scrub. The species epithet refers to its type locality, the only place the lichen is known to occur. Kondratyuk and colleagues proposed to transfer the taxon to the newly circumscribed Jackelixia in 2009, but this genus has not been widely accepted by other authorities.
