= Botaniska trädgården =

Botaniska trädgården (Swedish for "botanical garden") may refer to:

- Botaniska trädgården (Gothenburg)
- Botaniska trädgården (Lund)
- Botaniska trädgården (Uppsala)
