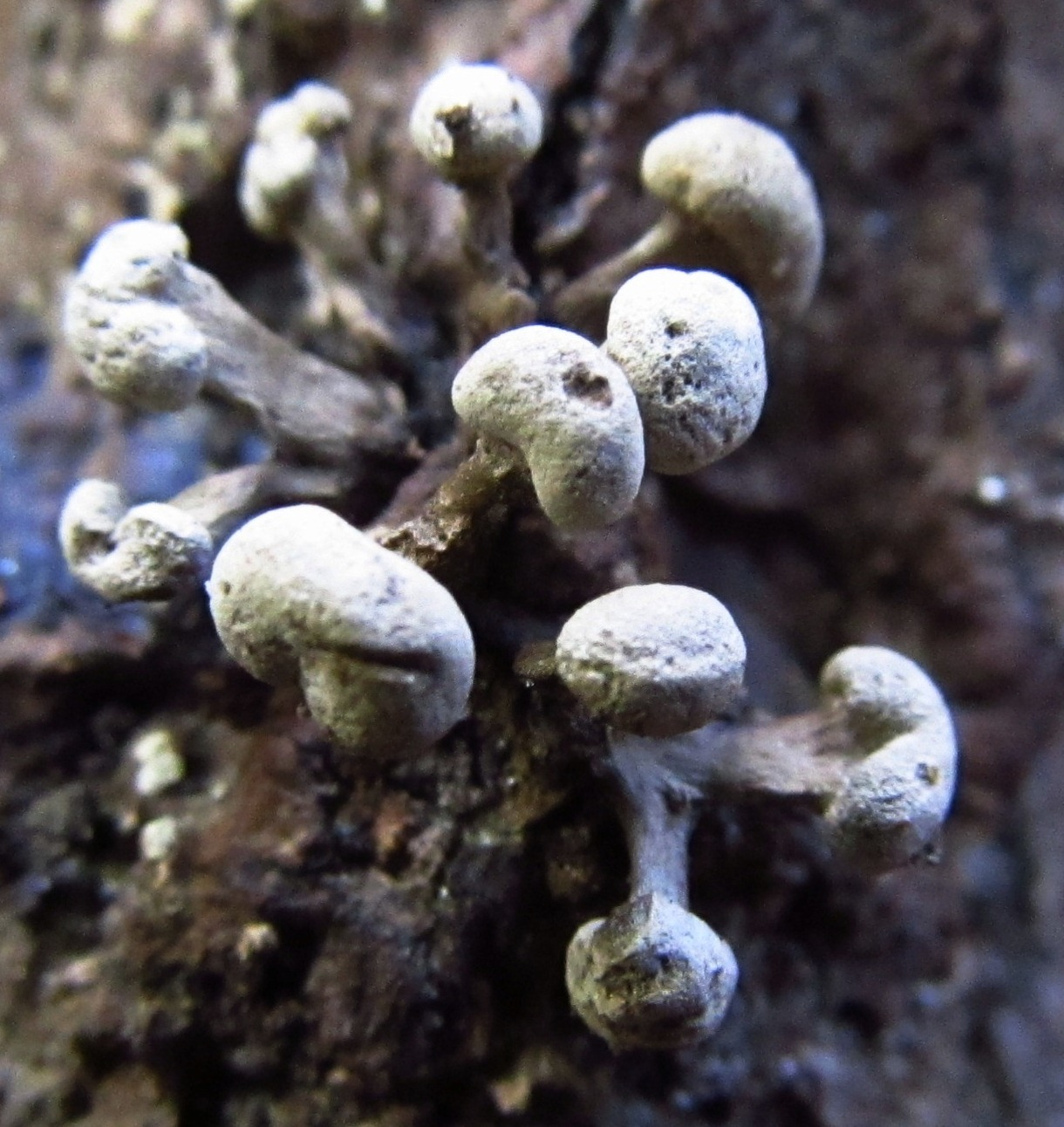

Scientific classification
- Kingdom: Fungi
- Division: Basidiomycota
- Class: Atractiellomycetes
- Order: Atractiellales
- Family: Phleogenaceae
- Genus: Phleogena; Link (1833)

Type species
- Phleogena faginea (Fr. & Palmquist) Link (1833)

Synonyms
- Ecchyna Fr. ex Boud.; Lasioderma Montagne, 1845; Martindalia P.A.Saccardo & J.B.Ellis, 1885

= Phleogena =

Genus of fungi

Phleogena is a fungal genus in the Phleogenaceae family. The genus is monotypic, containing the single species Phleogena faginea and is found mostly widespread in northern temperate areas, but is occasionally found in southern areas.
