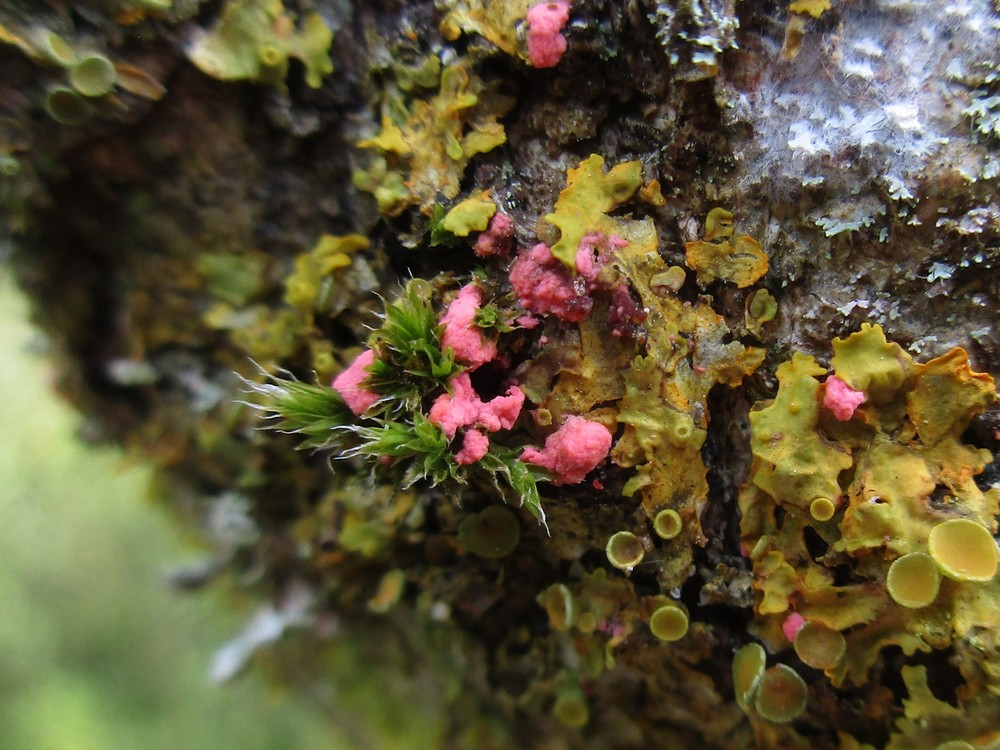
- Illosporiopsis christiansenii (pink) parasitizing lichen

Scientific classification
- Domain: Eukaryota
- Kingdom: Fungi
- Division: Ascomycota
- Class: Sordariomycetes
- Order: Hypocreales
- Family: Hypocreaceae
- Genus: Illosporiopsis
- Species: I. christiansenii

Binomial name
- Illosporiopsis christiansenii (B.L.Brady & D.Hawksw.) D.Hawksw. (2001)

Synonyms
- Hobsonia christiansenii B.L.Brady & D.Hawksw. (1986); Hobsonia christiansenii B.L.Brady (1986)

= Illosporiopsis christiansenii =

Species of fungus

Illosporiopsis christiansenii is a species of fungus that parasitizes lichen which is found in Europe and North America. It was first described as Hobsonia christiansenii.

== Description ==
Illosporiopsis christiansenii can be identified by its bright pink conidia, approximately 0.5–1 mm across and 0.2–2 mm high, which contrast strongly with the lichen it parasitizes. It is only known to reproduce asexually.

== Distribution ==
Illosporiopsis christiansenii is found throughout Europe and North America.

== Habitat ==
Illosporiopsis christiansenii parasitizes lichen, including Parmelia, Physcia and Xanthoria.
