= Teloschistopsis =

Scientific classification
- Domain: Eukaryota
- Kingdom: Fungi
- Division: Ascomycota
- Class: Lecanoromycetes
- Order: Teloschistales
- Family: Teloschistaceae
- Genus: Teloschistopsis; Frödén, Søchting & Arup (2013)

Type species
- Teloschistopsis chrysocarpoides (Vain.) Frödén, Søchting & Arup (2013)

Species
- T. bonae-spei T. chrysocarpoides T. eudoxa

Genus of lichen-forming fungi

Teloschistopsis is a genus of lichen-forming fungi in the family Teloschistaceae. It has three species.

== Taxonomy ==
The genus was circumscribed by Patrik Frödén, Ulrik Søchting, and Ulf Arup in 2013, as part of a molecular phylogenetics-led restructuring of the Teloschistaceae. The genus names alludes to resemblance to the genus Teloschistes. They assigned Teloschistopsis chrysocarpoides as the type species; This species was originally described as a member of Teloschistes by Edvard August Vainio in 1900.

== Description ==
Teloschistopsis is characterized by a leaf-like (foliose) to shrub-like (fruticose) structure. This lichen is robust, predominantly grey in colour, but can have orange spots or take on a more yellowish to orange hue. The species Teloschistopsis chrysocarpoides is particularly notable for its leaf-like structure with hair-like structures on its upper surface and a fully cracked underside that reveals its inner layer. Most other species in this genus have a rounded exterior that is usually covered with a protective layer, devoid of hair-like structures. This protective layer has a complex cellular structure (known as "scleroprosoplectechymatous") and often features large, light patches. The reproductive structures of Teloschistopsis are zeorine in form. Its spores have a unique developmental process, are generally oval in shape, and have short to medium dividing lines (septa. There are oil cells in the paraphyses. Additionally, the lichen has large, protruding structures (pycnidia) that produce spore-like cells (conidia). These conidia are usually oval, but can sometimes appear more elongated or even rod-shaped.

== Species ==
- Teloschistopsis bonae-spei (Almb. & Poelt) Frödén, Arup & Søchting (2013)
- Teloschistopsis chrysocarpoides (Vain.) Frödén, Arup & Søchting (2013)
- Teloschistopsis eudoxa (Müll.Arg.) Frödén, Arup & Søchting (2013)
