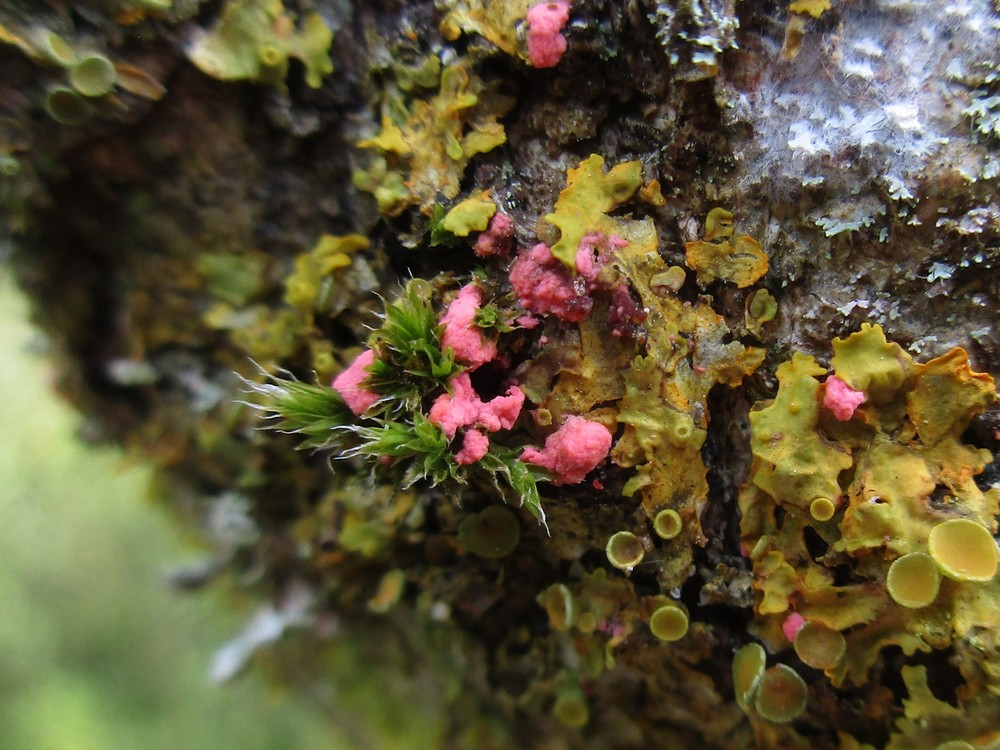
- Illosporiopsis christiansenii (pink) parasitizing lichen

Scientific classification
- Domain: Eukaryota
- Kingdom: Fungi
- Division: Ascomycota
- Class: Sordariomycetes
- Order: Hypocreales
- Family: Hypocreaceae
- Genus: Illosporiopsis; D.Hawksw.

= Illosporiopsis =

Genus of fungi

Illosporiopsis is a genus of fungi with one species, Illosporiopsis christiansenii, a fungus which parasitizes lichen. Illosporiopsis was described after DNA evidence showed that species previously ascribed to Hobsonia were unrelated.

== Taxonomy ==
Illosporiopsis contains the following species:

- Illosporiopsis christiansenii
