= Jackelixia whinrayi =

Scientific classification
- Kingdom: Fungi
- Division: Ascomycota
- Class: Lecanoromycetes
- Order: Teloschistales
- Family: Teloschistaceae
- Genus: Jackelixia
- Species: J. whinrayi

Binomial name
- Jackelixia whinrayi (S.Y.Kondr. & Kärnefelt) S.Y.Kondr., Fedorenko, S.Stenroos, Kärnefelt & A.Thell

Synonyms
- Xanthoria whinrayi S.Y.Kondr. & Kärnefelt

Species of lichen-forming fungus

Jackelixia whinrayi is a lichen in the family Teloschistaceae. It was first described in 2007 by Sergey Kondratyuk and Ingvar Kärnefelt as Xanthoria whinrayi, but was transferred to the genus Jackelixia in 2009 by Sergey Kondratyuk, Natalya M. Fedorenko, Soili Stenroos, Ingvar Kärnefelt, and Arne Thell.

The name accepted at Index Fungorum is Xanthoria whinrayi, while Jackelixia whinrayi is the name accepted by AusLichen and by Mycobank.

It is endemic to Australia, occurring in Tasmania, and has been found on the dead trunk of a dead Atriplex cinerea.
