= Xanthoparmelia ovealmbornii =

Scientific classification
- Domain: Eukaryota
- Kingdom: Fungi
- Division: Ascomycota
- Class: Lecanoromycetes
- Order: Lecanorales
- Family: Parmeliaceae
- Genus: Xanthoparmelia
- Species: X. ovealmbornii

Binomial name
- Xanthoparmelia ovealmbornii A.Thell, Feuerer, Elix & Kärnefelt (2006)

Synonyms
- Almbornia cafferensis Essl. (1981)

Species of lichen

Xanthoparmelia ovealmbornii is a species of saxicolous (rock-dwelling), somewhat fruticose lichen in the family Parmeliaceae. It occurs in the Cape Floristic Region of South Africa.

== Taxonomy ==
Xanthoparmelia ovealmbornii was originally described in 1981 as Almbornia cafferensis by Ted Esslinger. The species was later reclassified in Xanthoparmelia when Arne Thell, Tassilo Feuerer, John Alan Elix, and Ingvar Kärnefelt established the new name X. ovealmbornii, which honours the Swedish lichenologist Ove Almborn. A new species epithet was required because the name X. cafferensis was already occupied by a different species. Phylogenetic analysis shows it forms a well-supported clade with X. hottentotta, with 94% bootstrap support, despite the morphological differences between these species.

== Description ==
Xanthoparmelia ovealmbornii is a subfruticose lichen (having a somewhat shrub-like growth form) that grows in a loosely spreading to slightly cushion-like manner, reaching up to 5 cm across. The branches are linear and elongated, sometimes slightly swollen at intervals, and form a tangled mass. These branches range from very thin (0.04 cm) at their tips to rarely exceeding 0.4 cm in width in older sections. While mostly flat to slightly convex, the terminal portions can become almost cylindrical.

The upper surface is dark brown to black or grayish-black in color, generally smooth with a dull to slightly shiny appearance. The lower surface ranges from tan to pale brown, occasionally becoming as dark as the upper surface near the branch tips. The lichen lacks both soredia and isidia (structures for vegetative reproduction). Rather than having root-like structures (rhizines), it attaches to its substrate through scattered holdfast structures at the tips of some branches.

What makes this species particularly distinctive is its internal structure. While most members of the Parmeliaceae have a soft, loosely woven medulla (inner layer), this species has a uniquely dense, cartilage-like medulla. This tissue consists of fungal threads (hyphae) that are tightly packed and arranged parallel to the length of the branches, embedded in a dense matrix. This unusual anatomy appears to be an adaptation to provide mechanical support. Just below the upper surface lies a relatively thin layer containing the algal partner of the lichen.

The species contains norstictic acid as its main secondary metabolite, with small amounts of stictic acid and connorstictic acids also present. When tested with chemical spot tests, the medulla is PD+ (yellow-orange) and K+ (yellow turning to orange-red), and C−. Reproductive structures (apothecia and pycnidia) do not occur in this species.

== Habitat and distribution ==
Xanthoparmelia ovealmbornii is endemic to South Africa, specifically occurring within the Cape Floristic Region. The species is found at high elevations, growing on sandy rock surfaces at altitudes of 2,000 m (6,600 ft) or higher in mountainous areas. The only confirmed locations are from three collections: at Sonklip Peak (in the Ceres–Worcester district), on the plateau between Sonklip and Matroosberg, and at Toverkop in the Swartberg Mountains near Ladismith, where it was found growing at elevations between 1,800–2,100 m (5,900–6,900 ft). In these locations, it grows specifically on pebbly, sandy rock surfaces.

Due to the limited number of specimens collected, a complete understanding of the species' full distribution range and ecological preferences remains uncertain, though its apparent restriction to the Cape Floristic Region suggests it may be another example of the high plant and lichen endemism characteristic of this biodiversity hotspot.

== See also ==
- List of Xanthoparmelia species
