= Hoehnelomycetaceae =

Scientific classification
- Kingdom: Fungi
- Division: Basidiomycota
- Class: Atractiellomycetes
- Order: Atractiellales
- Family: Hoehnelomycetaceae; Jülich (1982)

Type genus
- Hoehnelomyces Weese (1920)

Genera
- Atractiella; Basidiopycnis; Proceropycnis

Synonyms
- Atractiellaceae R.T. Moore (1996)

Family of fungi

The Hoehnelomycetaceae are a family of fungi in the order Atractiellales. The family currently contains three genera and ten species. Basidiocarps (fruit bodies) are minute and ether stilboid (pin-shaped) or pycnidioid (flask-shaped). Microscopically they produce auricularioid (laterally septate) basidia. The type genus, Hoehnelomyces, is a synonym of Atractiella. Molecular research, based on cladistic analysis of DNA sequences, has shown that the Hoehnelomycetaceae are monophyletic (a natural grouping). The family has a worldwide distribution.
