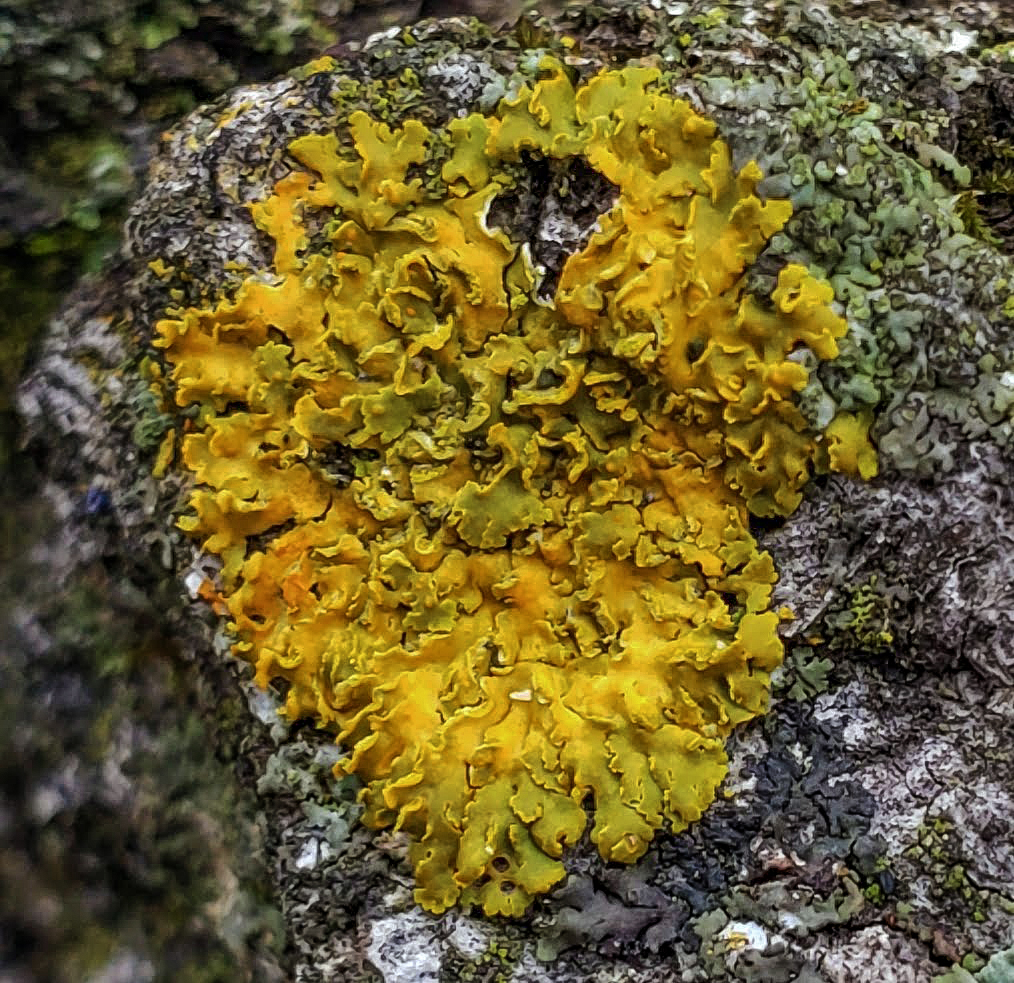

Scientific classification
- Domain: Eukaryota
- Kingdom: Fungi
- Division: Ascomycota
- Class: Lecanoromycetes
- Order: Teloschistales
- Family: Teloschistaceae
- Genus: Xanthoria
- Species: X. ulophyllodes

Binomial name
- Xanthoria ulophyllodes Räsänen (1931)

Synonyms
- Oxneria coppinsii S.Y.Kondr. & Kärnefelt (2003); Oxneria ulophyllodes (Räsänen) S.Y.Kondr. & Kärnefelt (2003); Xanthomendoza ulophyllodes (Räsänen) Søchting, Kärnefelt & S.Y.Kondr. (2002)

= Xanthoria ulophyllodes =

Species of lichen

Xanthoria ulophyllodes is a species of mostly saxicolous (corticolous-dwelling) lichen in the family Teloschistaceae. It was formally described as a new species in 1931 by Finnish lichenologist Veli Räsänen. In North America, one vernacular name for the species is powdery sunburst lichen.
