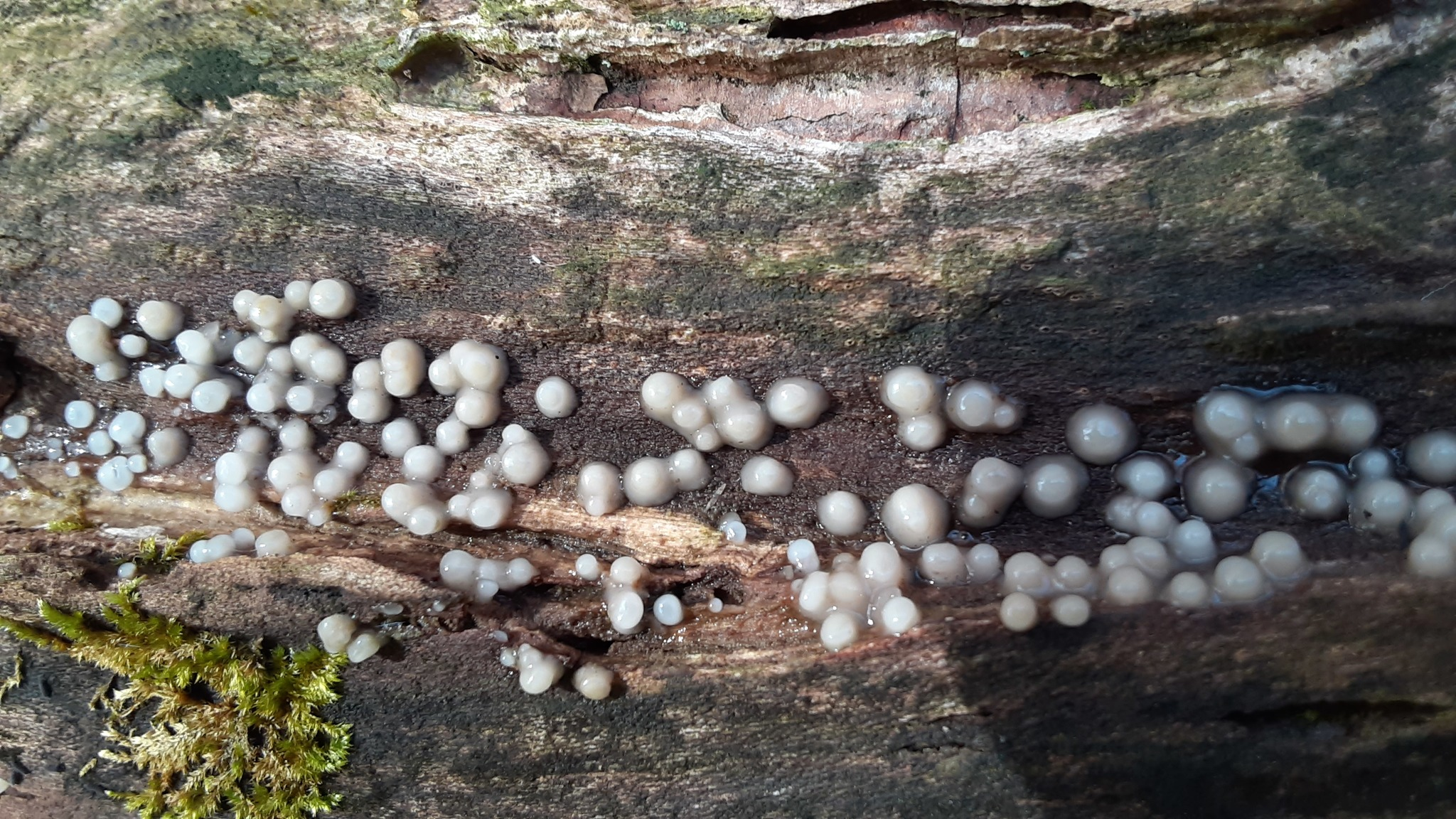
- Helicogloea compressa

Scientific classification
- Kingdom: Fungi
- Division: Basidiomycota
- Class: Atractiellomycetes
- Order: Atractiellales
- Family: Phleogenaceae
- Genus: Helicogloea; Pat. (1892)

Type species
- Helicogloea lagerheimii Pat. (1892)

Synonyms
- Saccoblastia Möller (1895); Infundibura Nag Raj & Kendrick (1981); Leucogloea R. Kirschner (2004); Neogloea Aime (2018)

= Helicogloea =

Genus of fungi

Helicogloea is a genus of fungi in the family Phleogenaceae. Basidiocarps (fruit bodies) are gelatinous, effused or pustular, and (microscopically) have unclamped hyphae and basidia that are auricularioid (tubular and laterally septate). Some species form asexual anamorphs producing conidia. The widespread genus contains more than 20 species.

== Species ==
- Helicogloea augustispora
- Helicogloea aquilonia
- Helicogloea aurea
- Helicogloea burdsallii
- Helicogloea caroliniana
- Helicogloea compressa
- Helicogloea crassitexta
- Helicogloea dryina
- Helicogloea eburnea
- Helicogloea exigua
- Helicogloea globosa
- Helicogloea inconspicua
- Helicogloea incrustans
- Helicogloea intermedia
- Helicogloea lagerheimii
- Helicogloea lunula
- Helicogloea microsaccata
- Helicogloea ovispora
- Helicogloea pellucida
- Helicogloea sebacea
- Helicogloea septifera
- Helicogloea sputum
- Helicogloea subardosiaca
- Helicogloea terminalis
- Helicogloea variabilis
