= Ove Almborn =

Swedish lichenologist (1914–1992)

- Born: 30 July 1914; Ronneby, Sweden
- Died: 6 March 1992 (aged 77); Lund, Sweden
- Education: Lund University
- Scientific career
- Fields: Lichenology
- Author abbrev. (botany): Almb.

Ove Almborn (30 July 1914 – 6 March 1992) was a Swedish lichenologist and educator. Born in Ronneby, Sweden, Almborn became interested in lichens during high school. His early academic interests and discoveries in new lichens inspired his doctoral dissertation, which focused on the distribution and ecology of lichens in South Scandinavia. After graduating from Lund University, he was employed at its department of systematic botany, initially as a senior lecturer and later as the curator of the botanical collections at its botanical garden.

Almborn's research advanced the understanding of lichen funga in southern Scandinavia and Southern Africa. He conducted fieldwork across multiple continents and published numerous papers on the subject that contributed to the knowledge of lichen biogeography and ecology. He also edited the Lichenes Africani exsiccata series and authored multiple studies on African lichens. Almborn supervised several students and was active in teaching and mentoring in systematic botany, while also assembling a substantial personal collection of botanical literature.

== Early life and education ==
Ove Almborn was born on 30 July 1914 in Ronneby, located in the southeastern Swedish province of Blekinge. Almborn's fascination with botany began in his youth in Ronneby after Bertil Hedvall introduced him to lichenology, which became his subject of interest during high school in the nearby city of Karlskrona. Almborn attended Lund University in 1933 and studied chemistry, zoology, and botany.

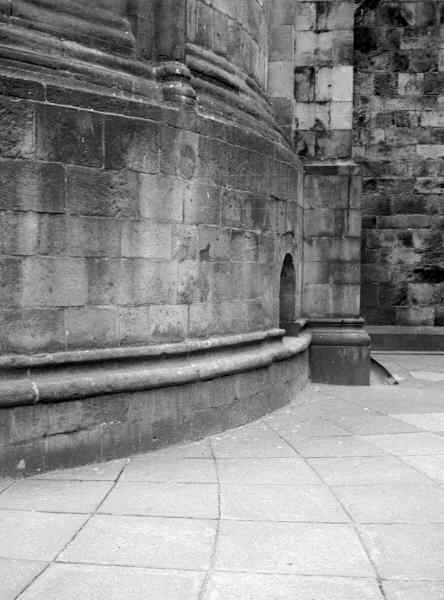
Almborn's first scientific publication was about the lichens on the exterior of the Lund Cathedral, a portion of which is pictured here in 1935.

Almborn's first contribution to the lichenological literature was a 1935 publication exploring the lichen biodiversity occurring at Lund Cathedral. Influenced significantly by Gunnar Degelius and other figures from the Uppsala circle led by Gustaf Einar Du Rietz, Almborn's doctoral thesis in 1948 reflected the Uppsala school's approach to plant ecology and phytosociology. The thesis focused on the distribution and ecology of certain lichens in southern Scandinavia. The work contributed baseline information on the region's lichen flora that later proved useful in conservation studies.

== Career ==
After obtaining his Bachelor of Arts degree in 1936 (which qualified him as a high-school teacher), Almborn was appointed as a docent at Lund University. He began research during this period exploring the lichen funga of Southern Africa.

=== Academic and field research ===
From 1954 to 1966, Almborn balanced his role as a high school teacher in Malmö with his passion for lichenology, contributing to the field through various publications and research. In 1955, Almborn conducted a study of the lichens on the island of Hallands Väderö. The study documented the island's lichen flora and formed part of Almborn's broader research on lichen diversity in Scandinavia.

Almborn's research in Southern Africa began in 1953, funded by a grant from the Swedish Natural Science Research Council. There, he expanded understanding of the region's lichen populations and fostered international collaborations. During his first trip, he explored and collected lichen specimens in South Africa and Mozambique. He returned in 1983–84 to gather more material to further progress his research. Between 1956 and 1991, Almborn edited 150 issues of the Lichenes Africani exsiccata series, and authored multiple additional studies on African lichens. Much of his spare time during this period was spent building up collections of lichens.

=== Educational contributions ===
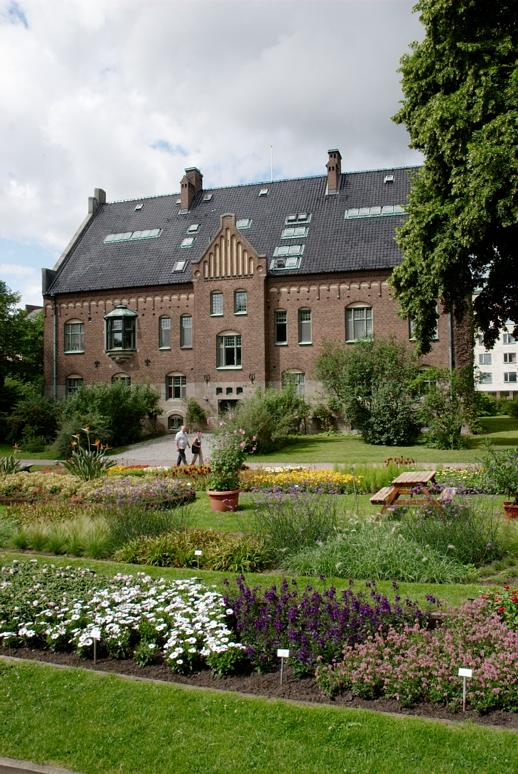
Starting in 1966, Almborn was a collection curator in the herbarium of Lund University's Botaniska trädgården (Botanical Garden).

In 1966, Almborn became the curator of the herbarium at the Lund University Botanical Museum, where he furthered his contributions to botany and lichenology. He was known for his large collection of botanical literature and, while not involved in academic teaching that would garner him students naturally, instead obtained permission to be partial supervisor for those that frequently visited the museum.

His one true supervisory position prior to this was with Hans Runemark in the 1940s, who worked on the yellow species of the crustose lichen genus Rhizocarpon, with Ove Almborn as his supervisor. Later, several years after his curator position began, Almborn met Ingvar Kärnefelt. Because Almborn was known for mentoring students in lichenology, having several graduate students under his care at that time, he subsequently became Kärnefelt's supervisor as well. Almborn travelled with Kärnefelt to South Africa in 1984, a six-week tour that spurred later International Association for Lichenology field excursions and strengthened Sweden–southern Africa lichenological ties.

Kärnefelt recalled in a 75th birthday letter written in 1989 first meeting Almborn in 1970 and described a long-standing professional relationship in which Almborn provided guidance in the study of lichens. His frequent outings with colleagues and contributions to academic gatherings was noted by Kärnefelt as helping to create a supportive environment for students in Lund University's botanical department that bolstered their later successes. With Almborn's encouragement, Kärnefelt eventually established his own career as a lichenologist.

Almborn retired in 1980, but continued to engage in lichenology, and published several dozen papers after his retirement. Despite his comprehensive research on the genera Pertusaria and Teloschistes, Almborn was unable to see these projects to their completion. Nevertheless, his interim contributions in 1989 and 1992 considerably advanced scientific understanding of these groups.

== Personal ==
During his career Almborn maintained contacts with lichenologists in several countries and regularly attended academic conferences. He was named a guest at many botanical meetings and Kärnefelt commented on how lively such functions made Almborn, having him "raise the festive atmosphere by telling good stories from his rich repertory on botanists from the old days". David Galloway wrote of him: "A figure of impressive physical dimension and deportment he was rather stately but gentle and very kindly in manner. Always the sartorially correct, courteous gentleman, he could at times be a devastatingly funny raconteur and he had a well-developed almost "English" sense of humour which was allowed to flash from time to time to illuminate an at times rather forbidding exterior".

Almborn, a private individual, died alone in his home in Lund on 6 March 1992. His final collection of botanical literature, which included most of the published works of Carl Linnaeus, was described by Kärnefelt as "one of the best in the world".

== Legacy ==
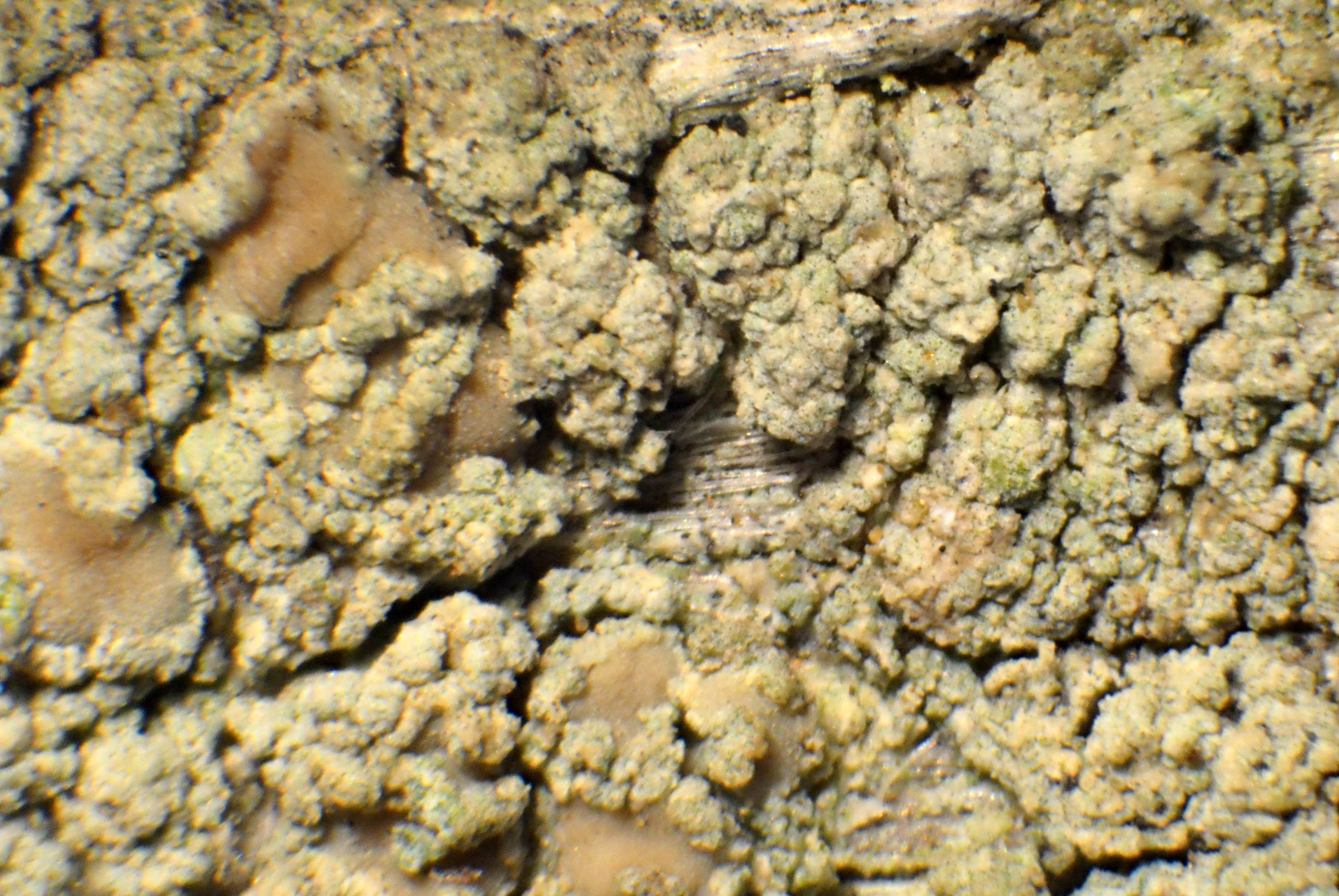
Lecanora confusa is a species that was formally described by Almborn in 1955.

Almborn's work on the lichen flora of southern Scandinavia and southern Africa significantly advanced the understanding of these ecosystems. His doctoral research became a foundational work, particularly influencing the 'Endangered lichens in southern Sweden' project conducted from 1987 to 1996, providing baseline data crucial for monitoring and protecting lichen biodiversity in the region.

Almborn was a prolific contributor to lichenological literature, writing about 100 reviews that critically evaluated emerging research and recent publications, and helped guide the discipline's development. Until his retirement in 1980, Almborn maintained the herbarium collections at the Botanical Museum of Lund University, leaving them "very well organized". Almborn bequeathed his lichenological library and personal collections to Lund University after his death, which "laid the ground for future lichenological research in Lund".

=== Eponyms ===
In 1981, Theodore Esslinger named the lichen genus Almbornia after Almborn, describing him as the "foremost student of South African lichens"; the genus has since been subsumed into Xanthoparmelia following a molecular study. Several lichenologists dedicated the genus Ovealmbornia (family Teloschistaceae) to him in 2009, noting his development to the knowledge of African lichen flora. Several species have also been named to honour Almborn. These include: Diploschistes almbornii C.W.Dodge (1964); Parmelia almbornii Hale (1971); Collema almbornii Degel. (1974); Rinodina almbornii H.Mayrhofer (1984); Caloplaca almbornii Kärnefelt (1987); Lithothelium almbornii R.C.Harris & Aptroot (1991); Neofuscelia almbornii Henssen (1992); Psora almborniana Lumbsch & Kothe (1993); and Micarea almbornii Coppins (1999). When Almbornia was subsumed into Xanthoparmelia, Almbornia cafferensis was given the new name Xanthoparmelia ovealmbornii A.Thell, Feuerer, Elix & Kärnefelt (2006).

== Selected publications ==
Kärnefelt provides a complete list of all of Almborn's 141 scientific publications from 1935 to 1992 in his 1994 obituary. Some representative works are listed here:

- Almborn, Ove (1935). "Lavama på Lunds domkyrka" [Lichens at Lund Cathedral]. Skánes natur (in Swedish). 22: 185–186.
- —————— (1948). Distribution and ecology of some South Scandinavian lichens. Bibliotheca Botanica. Vol. 1. Adendorf, Germany: CWK Gleerup.
- —————— (1952). "A key to the sterile corticolous crustaceous lichens occurring in South Sweden". Botaniska Notiser. 1952: 239–263.
- —————— (1966). "Revision of some lichen genera in southern Africa I". Botaniska Notiser. 119 (1): 70–112.
- —————— (1978). "Carl von Linné" (PDF). Svensk Botanisk Tidskrift (in Swedish). 72: 241–260.
- —————— (1989). "Revision of the lichen genus Teloschistes in central and southern Africa". Nordic Journal of Botany. 8 (5): 521–537. doi:10.1111/j.1756-1051.1989.tb00531.x.
- —————— (1992). "Some overlooked or misidentified species of Teloschistes from South America and a key to the South-American species". Nordic Journal of Botany. 12 (3): 361–364. doi:10.1111/j.1756-1051.1992.tb01315.x.

== See also ==
- Category:Taxa named by Ove Almborn
