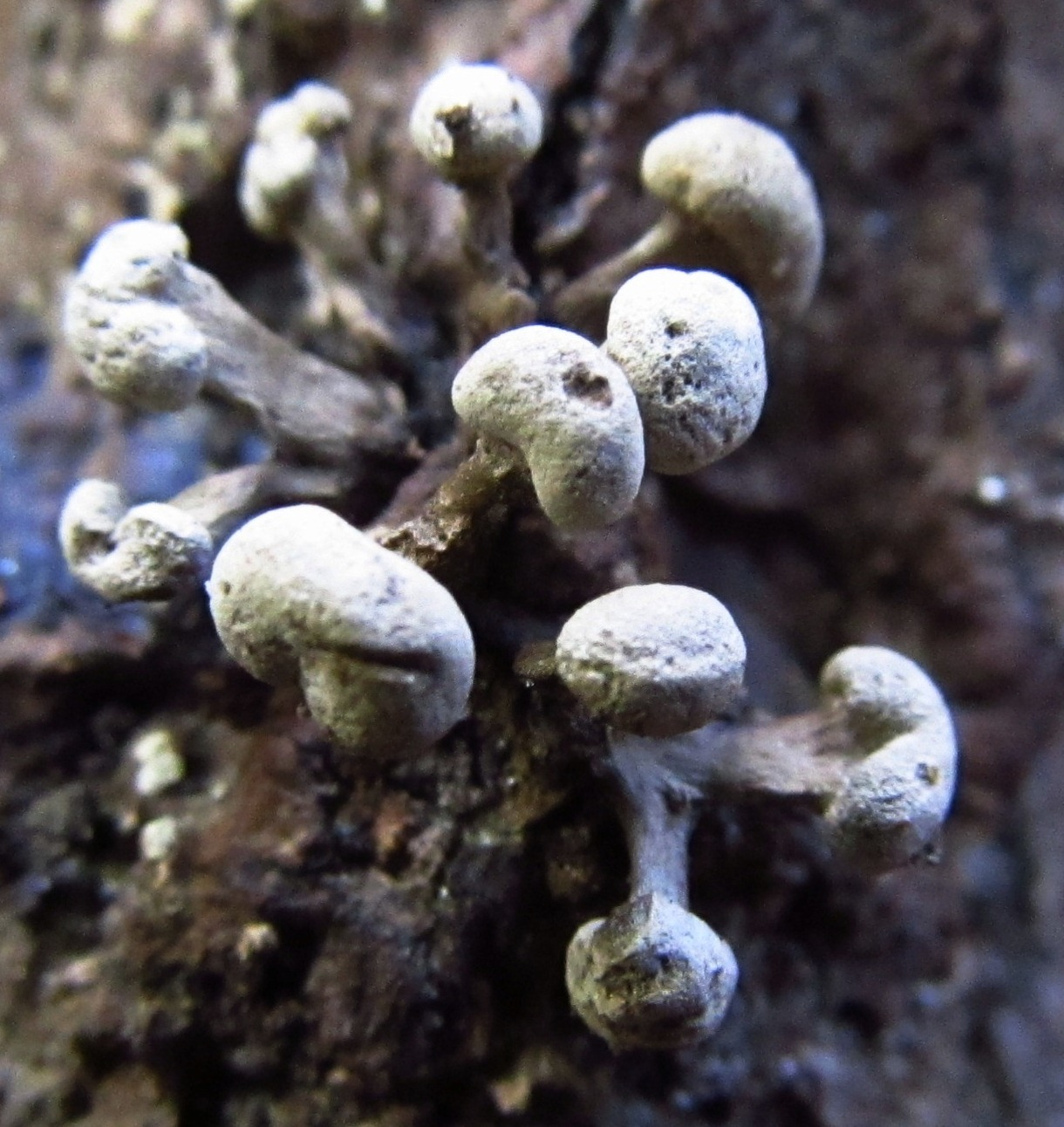
- Phleogena faginea

Scientific classification
- Kingdom: Fungi
- Division: Basidiomycota
- Class: Atractiellomycetes
- Order: Atractiellales
- Family: Phleogenaceae; Weese (1920)

Type genus
- Phleogena Link (1833)

Genera
- Atractidochium; Bourdotigloea; Helicogloea; Hobsonia; Phleogena; Saccosoma

Synonyms
- Ecchynaceae Rea (1922); Saccoblastiaceae Jülich (1982)

= Phleogenaceae =

Family of fungi

The Phleogenaceae are a family of fungi in the order Atractiellales. The family currently contains six genera and around 50 species.
