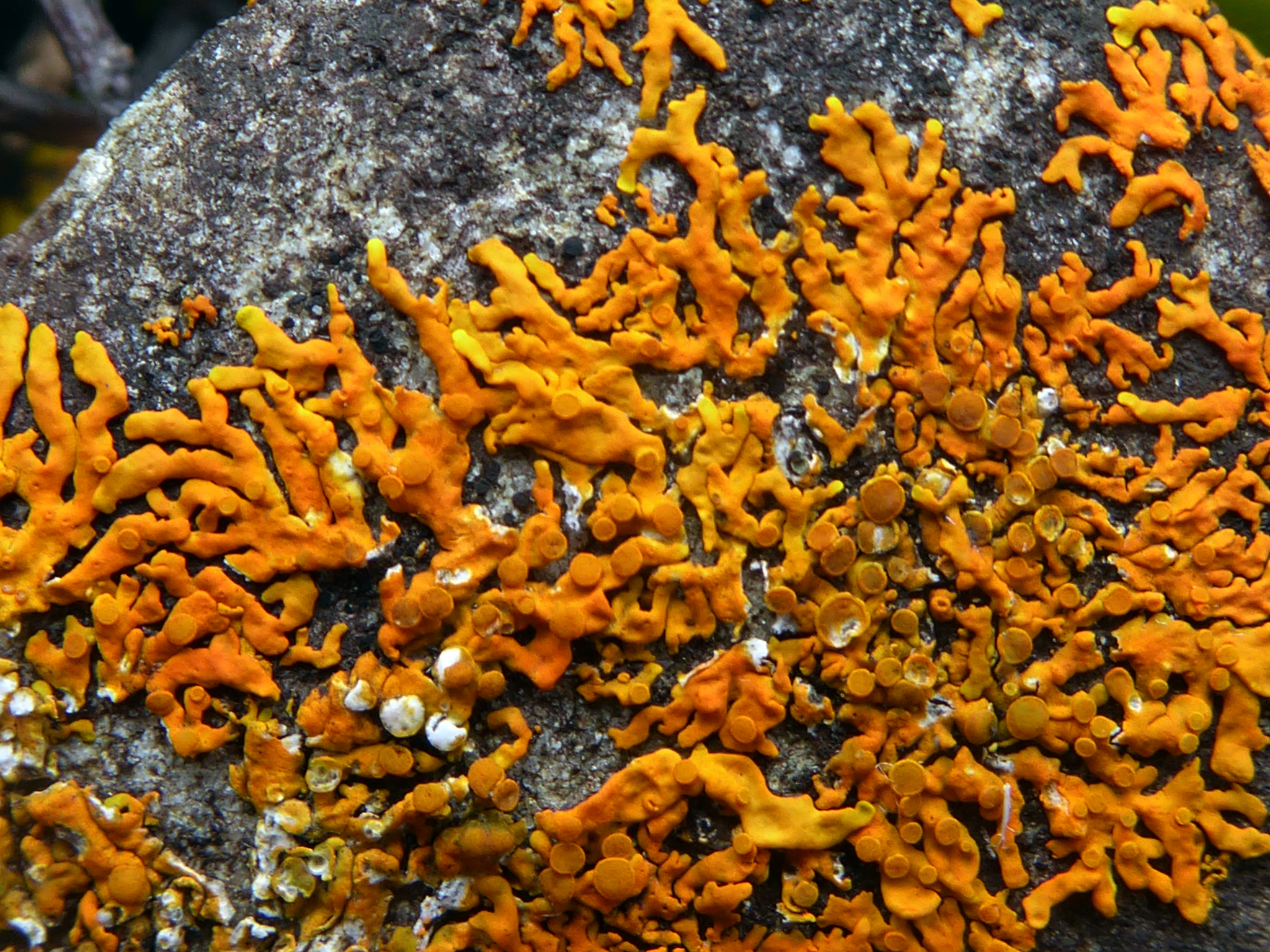
- Dufourea ligulata

Scientific classification
- Domain: Eukaryota
- Kingdom: Fungi
- Division: Ascomycota
- Class: Lecanoromycetes
- Order: Teloschistales
- Family: Teloschistaceae
- Genus: Dufourea; Ach. (1809)

Type species
- Dufourea flammea (L.f.) Ach. (1810)

Synonyms
- Jackelixia S.Y.Kondr., Fedorenko, S.Stenroos, Kärnefelt & A.Thell (2009); Ovealmbornia S.Y.Kondr., Fedorenko, S.Stenroos, Kärnefelt, Elix & A.Thell (2009); Xanthodactylon P.A.Duvign. (1941); Xanthokarrooa S.Y.Kondr., Fedorenko, S.Stenroos, Kärnefelt, Elix & A.Thell (2009)

= Dufourea (lichen) =

Genus of lichens

Dufourea is a genus of mostly foliose lichen species in the subfamily Xanthorioideae of the family Teloschistaceae. Species in the genus are found in the Southern Hemisphere.

== Taxonomy ==
The genus was originally circumscribed by Swedish lichenologist Erik Acharius in Johann Albert Luyken's 1809 publication Tentamen historiae lichenum, although he did not assign any species to the genus. The following year, Acharius included Dufourea in his influential work Lichenographia Universalis and included six species. Luyken had studied under Acharius in Sweden and had access to Acharius's work before it was published; because his text about the genus is a partial transcription of Acharius's work (and he acknowledged Acharius), Acharius is credited as the author of the name as well as the description. All six species that Acharius included in Dufourea are now classified in different genera. A type species for the genus, Dufourea flammea, was selected by Giuseppe De Notaris in 1846. The genus was resurrected for use in 2013 following a large-scale molecular phylogenetic analysis of the family Teloschistaceae. Dufourea species are grouped in a clade with a sister taxon relationship to genus Xanthoria.

The generic name Dufourea honours French medical doctor and naturalist Léon Jean Marie (or Jean-Marie Léon) Dufour (1780–1865).

== Description ==
Dufourea lichens occur in the Southern Hemisphere, with several species from South Africa and Australia. Most species are foliose (bushy) and relatively large, and lack true rhizines, although some species have short rhizine-like structures.

== Species ==
As of May 2024, Species Fungorum accepts 22 species of Dufourea.

- Dufourea africana (Almb.) Frödén, Arup & Søchting (2013)
- Dufourea alexanderbaai (S.Y.Kondr. & Kärnefelt) Frödén, Arup & Søchting (2013)
- Dufourea angustata (S.Y.Kondr. & Kärnefelt) Frödén, Arup & Søchting (2013)
- Dufourea australis (Zahlbr.) Frödén, Arup & Søchting (2013)
- Dufourea bonae-spei (S.Y.Kondr. & Kärnefelt) Frödén, Arup & Søchting (2013)
- Dufourea capensis (Kärnefelt, Arup & L.Lindblom) Frödén, Arup & Søchting (2013)
- Dufourea dissectula (S.Y.Kondr. & Kärnefelt) Frödén, Arup & Søchting (2013)
- Dufourea doidgeae (Eichenb., Aptroot & Honegger) Frödén, Arup & Søchting (2013)
- Dufourea elixii (S.Y.Kondr. & Kärnefelt) Frödén, Arup & Søchting (2013)
- Dufourea filsonii (Elix) Frödén, Arup & Søchting (2013)
- Dufourea flammea (L.f.) Ach. (1810)
- Dufourea incavata (Stirt.) Frödén, Arup & Søchting (2013)
- Dufourea inflata (Eichenb., Aptroot & Honegger) Frödén, Arup & Søchting (2013)
- Dufourea karrooensis (S.Y.Kondr. & Kärnefelt) Frödén, Arup & Søchting (2013)
- Dufourea ligulata (Körb.) Frödén, Arup & Søchting (2013)
- Dufourea marlothii (Zahlbr.) Frödén, Arup & Søchting (2013)
- Dufourea ottolangei (S.Y.Kondr., V.Wirth & Kärnefelt) Wilk & Lücking (2021)
- Dufourea physcioides A.Massal. (1861)
- Dufourea sipmanii (S.Y.Kondr. & Kärnefelt) Frödén, Arup & Søchting (2013)
- Dufourea streimannii (S.Y.Kondr. & Kärnefelt) Frödén, Arup & Søchting (2013)
- Dufourea turbinata (Vain.) Frödén, Arup & Søchting (2013)
- Dufourea volkmarwirthii (S.Y.Kondr.) Wilk & Lücking (2021)
