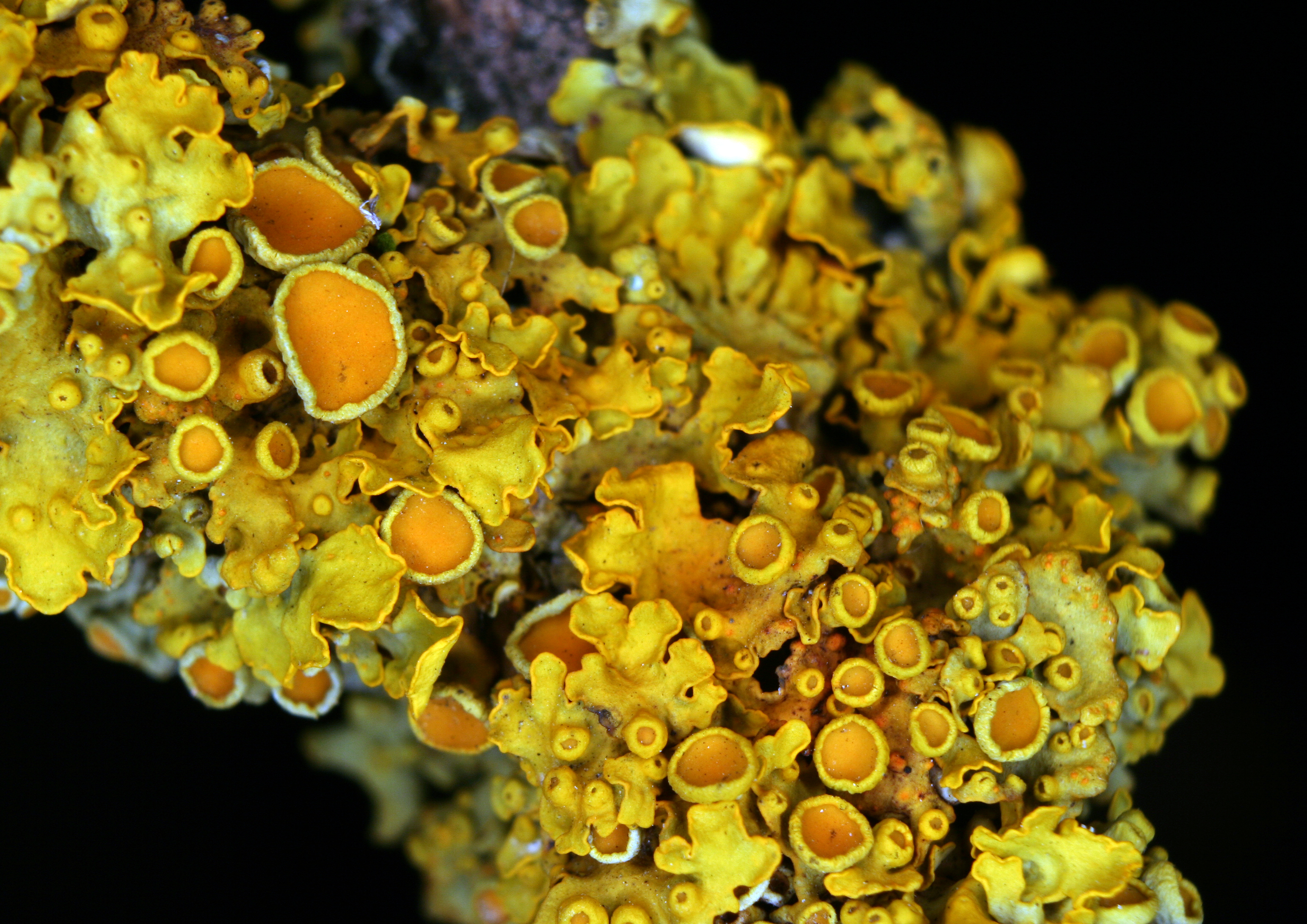
- Xanthoria parietina

Scientific classification
- Kingdom: Fungi
- Division: Ascomycota
- Class: Lecanoromycetes
- Order: Teloschistales
- Family: Teloschistaceae
- Genus: Xanthoria (Fr.) Th.Fr. (1860)

Type species
- Xanthoria parietina (L.) Th.Fr. (1860)

Species
- See text

Synonyms
- List: Parmelia subdiv. Xanthoria Fr. (1825); Blasteniospora Trevis. (1853); Dufouria Trevis. (1861); Nylanderiella Hue (1914); Parmocarpus Trevis. (1861); Placodium Weber ex F.H.Wigg. (1780); Pycnothele Sommerf. (1826); Rusavskia S.Y.Kondr. & Kärnefelt (2003); Siphonia Fr. (1820); Siphula Fr. (1824); Xanthoriomyces E.A.Thomas ex Cif. & Tomas. (1953)

= Xanthoria =

Genus of lichens

Xanthoria is a genus of lichenized fungi in the family Teloschistaceae. Common names include orange lichen, orange wall lichen, and sunburst lichen. They can be identified by their characteristic squamulose morphology with distinctive "fairy cups".

== Species ==
As of October 2023, Species Fungorum (in the Catalogue of Life) accepts 19 species of Xanthoria.

- Xanthoria aureola (Ach.) Erichsen (1930)
- Xanthoria calcicola Oxner (1937)
- Xanthoria coomae S.Y.Kondr. & Kärnefelt (2007)
- Xanthoria ectaneoides (Nyl.) Zahlbr. (1931)
- Xanthoria hypogymnioides S.Y.Kondr. & Kärnefelt (2007)
- Xanthoria ibizaensis S.Y.Kondr. & A.S.Kondr. (2020)
- Xanthoria juniperina S.Y.Kondr. (2013)
- Xanthoria kangarooensis S.Y.Kondr. & Kärnefelt (2009)
- Xanthoria lapalmaensis Schumm & S.Y.Kondr. (2017)
- Xanthoria parietina (L.) Th.Fr. (1860) – common orange lichen, yellow scale, maritime sunburst lichen, shore lichen
- Xanthoria polessica S.Y.Kondr. & Yatsyna (2013)
- Xanthoria pylyporlykii S.Y.Kondr., Kärnefelt & A.Thell (2024) – Europe
- Xanthoria rutilans (Ach.) S.Y.Kondr. (2002)
- Xanthoria schummii S.Y.Kondr. (2017)
- Xanthoria splendidula (Zahlbr.) Makryĭ (2007)
- Xanthoria ulophyllodes Räsänen (1931) – powdery sunburst lichen
- Xanthoria whinrayi S.Y.Kondr. & Kärnefelt (2007)
- Xanthoria yorkensis S.Y.Kondr. & Kärnefelt (2009)

The taxa Xanthoria coomae S.Y.Kondr. & Kärnefelt (2007) and Xanthoria polessica S.Y.Kondr. & Yatsyna (2013) were determined to be the same species as X. parietina in a 2020 publication. The taxon once known as Xanthoria elegans is now Rusavskia elegans, the type species of genus Rusavskia.
