= Botaniska trädgården (Lund) =

Botanical garden in Lund, Sweden

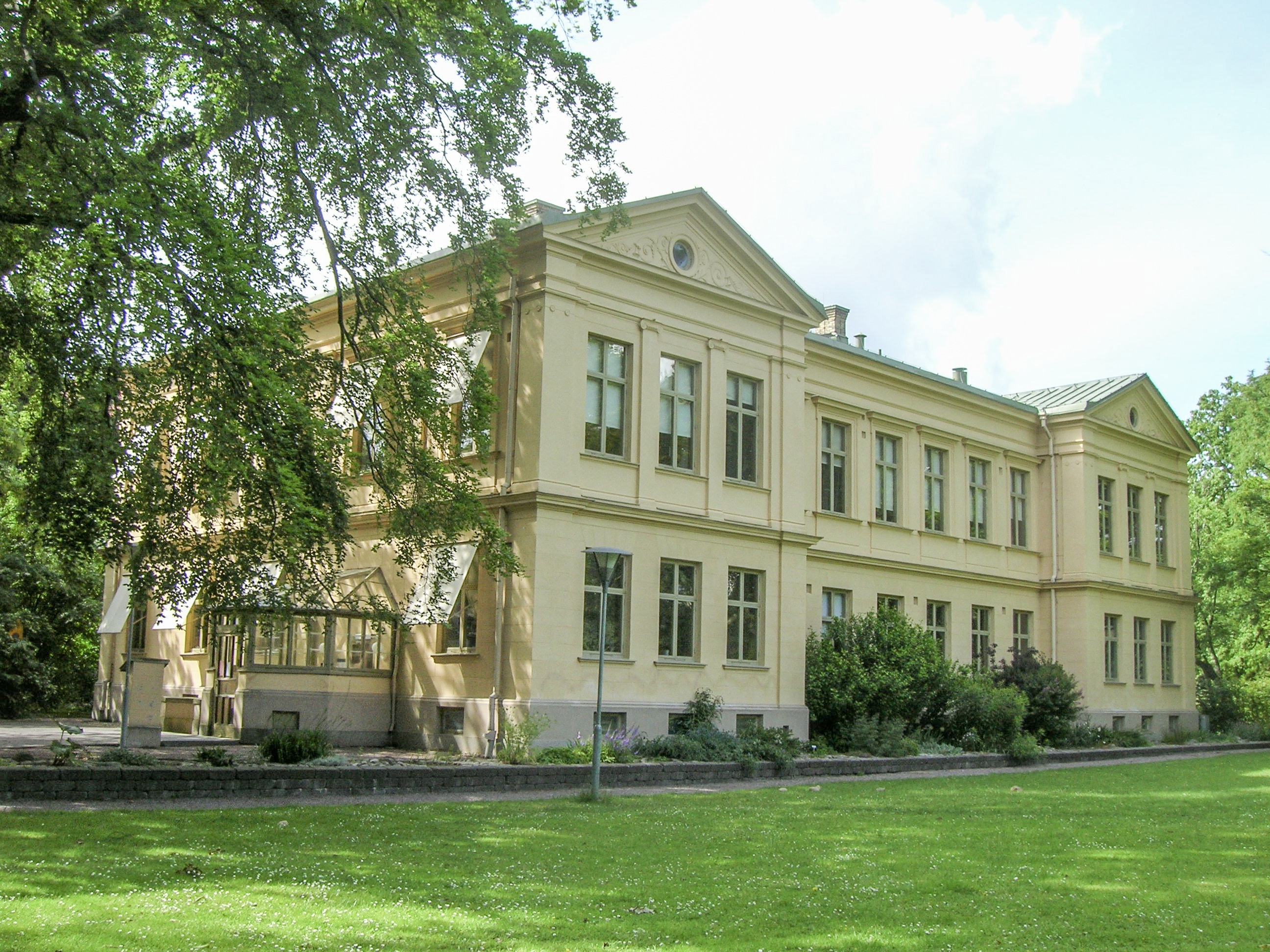
- 19th century villa

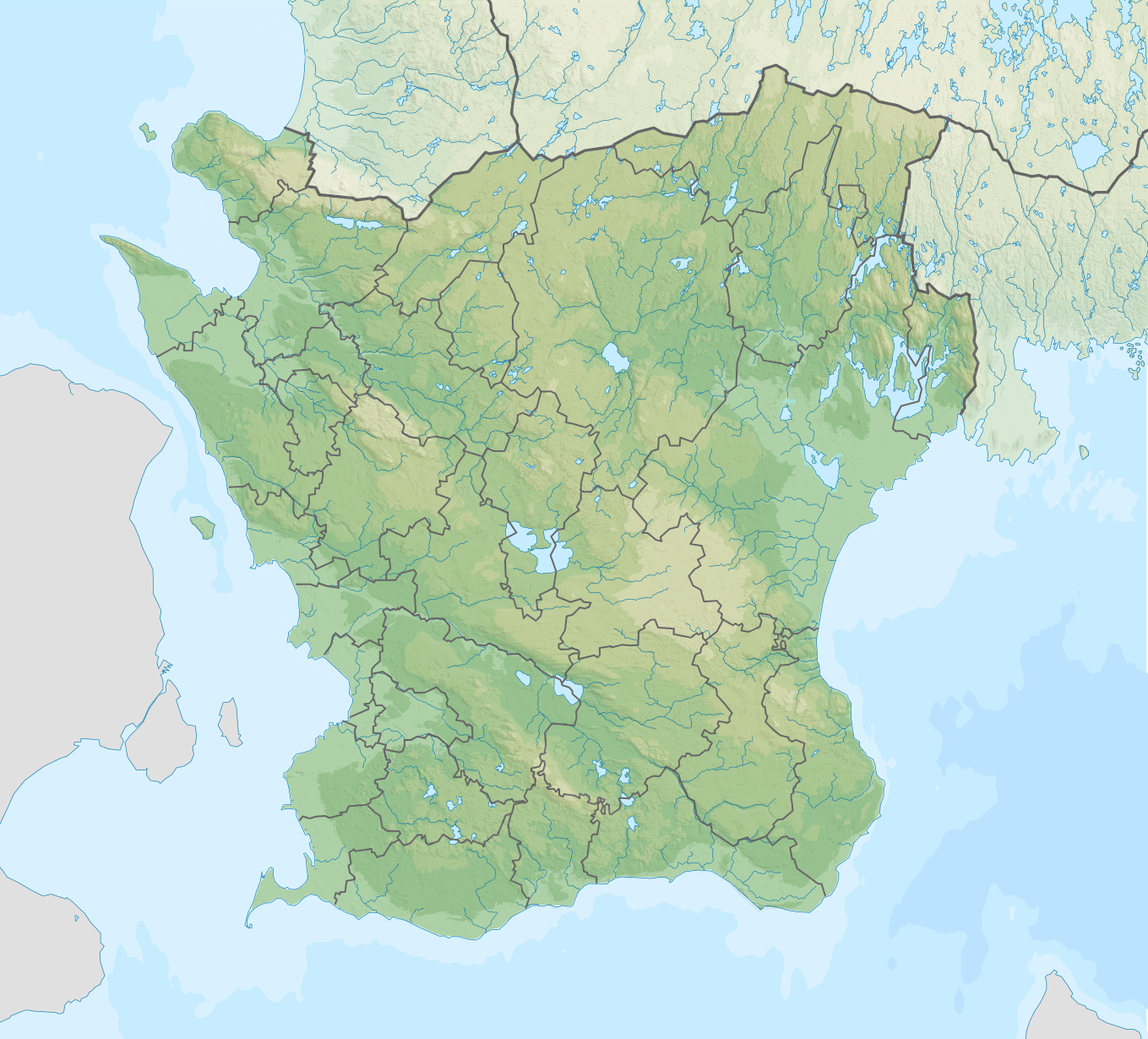
- Location within Skåne Location within Sweden
- Interactive map of Botaniska trädgården
- Type: Botanical garden
- Location: Östra Vallgatan 20, 223 61 Lund, Sweden
- Coordinates: 55°42′14″N 13°12′10″E
- Area: 8 hectares (20 acres)
- Opened: 1690; 336 years ago
- Operator: Lund University
- Website: Official website

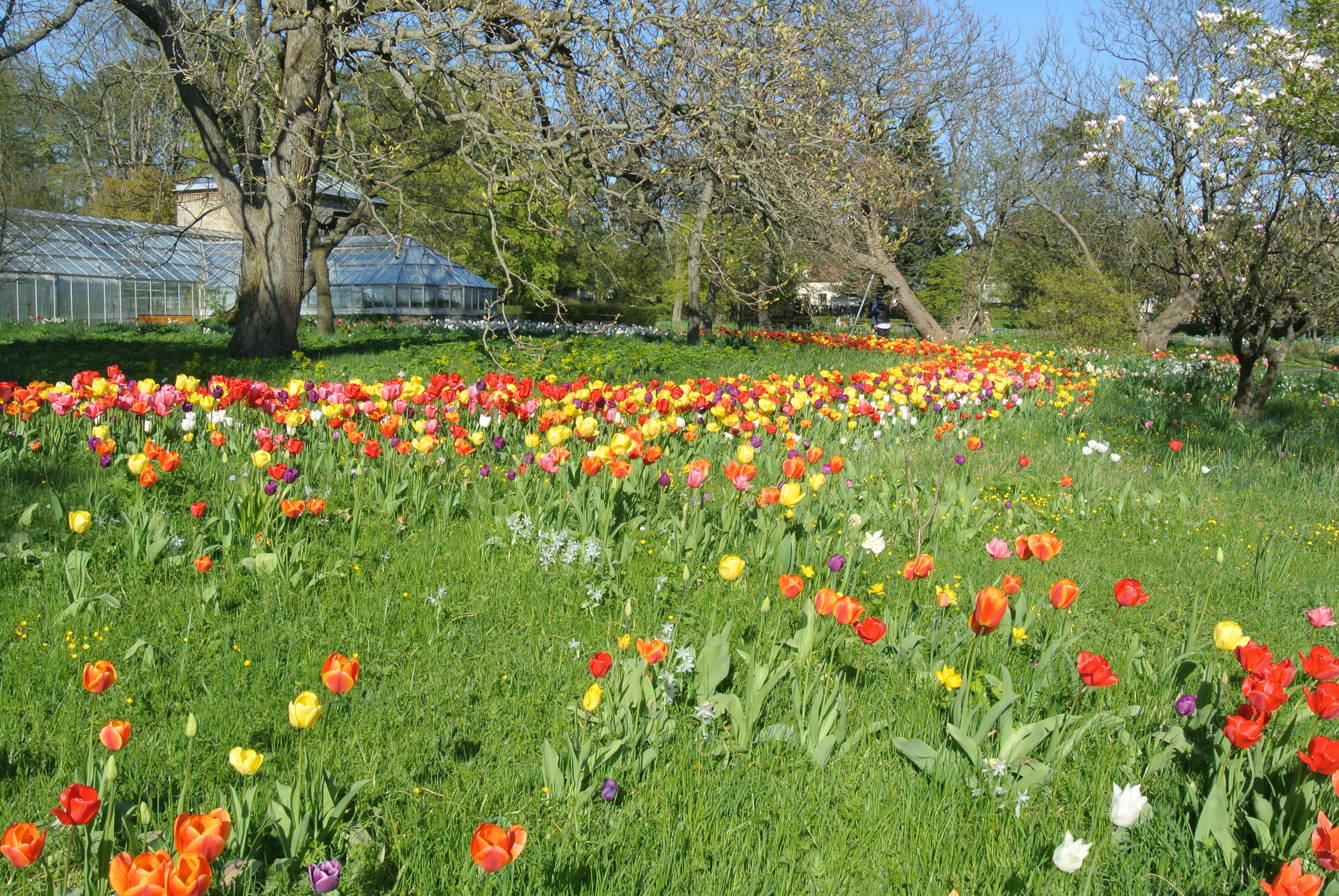
Tulips at Lund's Botanical Garden.

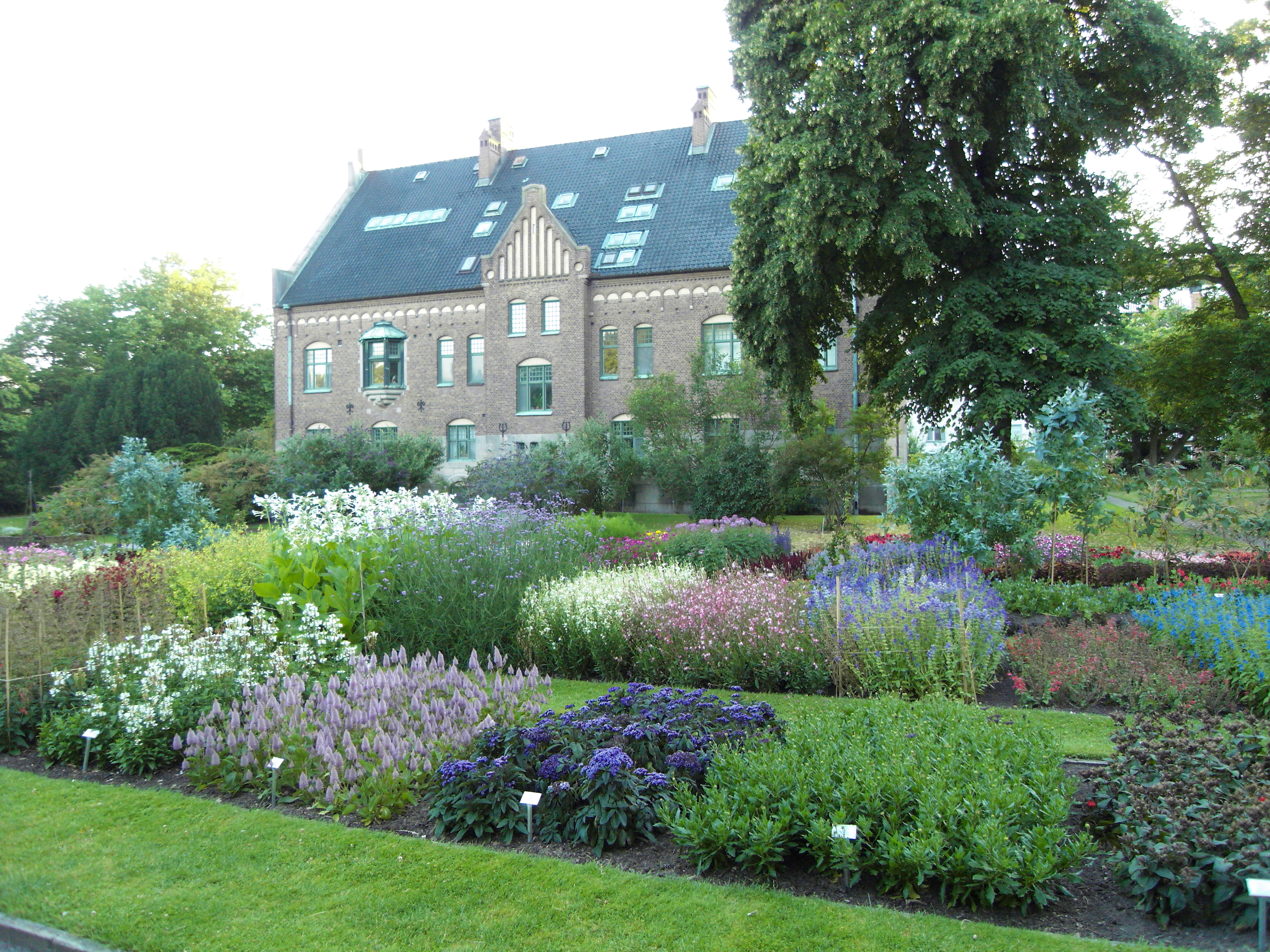
Flowers, and herbs in front of the botanical museum.

Botaniska trädgården (English: The Botanical Garden) is a botanical garden in central Lund, Sweden, open to the public daily without charge. The 8 hectares site contains 7000 species of plants, of which 2000 are found in the greenhouses representing nine different climate zones. It is owned and operated by Lund University. Its international identification code is LD.

== History ==
The university garden has existed since 1690, at that time in front of the present site of the Lund University Main Building. In the 1860s, the garden outgrew the area and was, in 1862 to, moved its current location along Östra Vallgatan. This time Jacob Georg Agardh designed the blueprints for the garden and greenhouses. In 1974, the garden was named a national historical landmark.

The Botanical Garden is owned and managed by the Swedish National Property Board (Statens fastighetsverk). Lund University and the Botanical Garden itself are responsible for running the garden.

For a long time, the Swedish National Property Board, Lund University, and donors have worked to revitalize the Botanical Garden’s greenhouses, especially because the endangered Ceroxylon palms had grown all the way to the roof.
