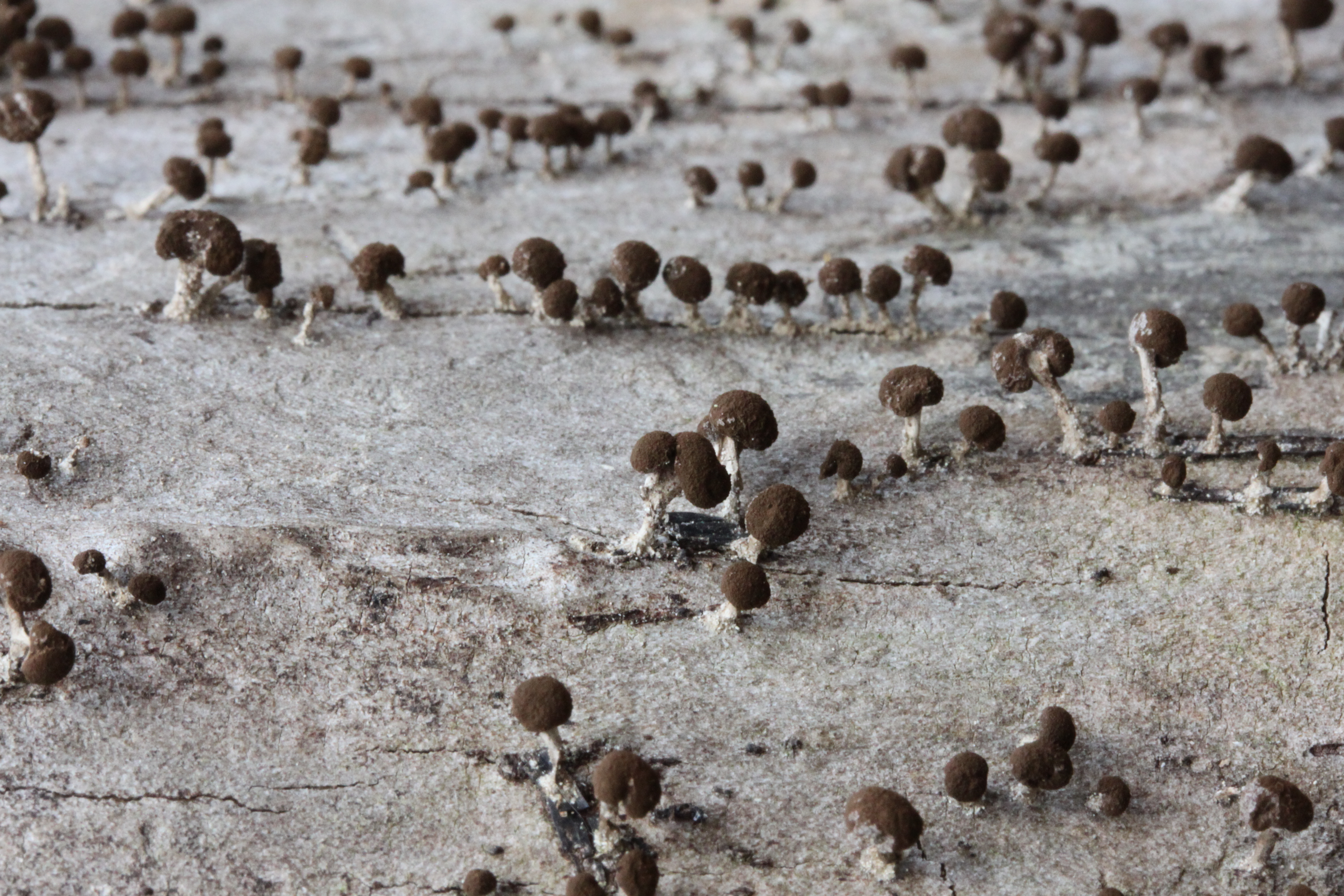
- Phleogena faginea

Scientific classification
- Kingdom: Fungi
- Division: Basidiomycota
- Subdivision: Pucciniomycotina
- Class: Atractiellomycetes; R. Bauer, Begerow, J.P. Samp., M. Weiss & Oberw.
- Order: Atractiellales; Oberw. & Bandoni

Families
- Atractogloeaceae; Hoehnelomycetaceae; Phleogenaceae

= Atractiellomycetes =

Order of fungi

The Atractiellomycetes are class of fungi in the Pucciniomycotina subdivision of the Basidiomycota. The class consists of a single order, the Atractiellales, which contains 3 families, 10 genera, and 58 species.
