= Elixjohnia jackelixii =

Scientific classification
- Kingdom: Fungi
- Division: Ascomycota
- Class: Lecanoromycetes
- Order: Teloschistales
- Family: Teloschistaceae
- Genus: Elixjohnia
- Species: E. jackelixii

Binomial name
- Elixjohnia jackelixii (S.Y.Kondr., Kärnefelt & A.Thell) S.Y.Kondr. & Hur (2017)
- Holotype site: Cygnet Island, Tasmania

Synonyms
- Caloplaca jackelixii S.Y.Kondr., Kärnefelt & A.Thell (2009); Sirenophila jackelixii (S.Y.Kondr., Kärnefelt & A.Thell) Søchting, Arup & Frödén (2013)

Species of lichen

Elixjohnia jackelixii is a species of saxicolous (rock-dwelling), crustose lichen in the family Teloschistaceae. It is found in Australia and New Zealand. The lichen is characterised by its unique multilayered appearance with outer sterile rings that are brownish or greenish-yellow and inner areoles that are whitish, yellowish, or greyish, often cracked to reveal the medulla underneath. Its fruiting bodies, or apothecia, are typically attached directly to the thallus and vary in colour and shape.

== Taxonomy ==
The lichen was first scientifically described as new to science in 2009 by the lichenologists Sergey Kondratyuk, Ingvar Kärnefelt, and Arne Thell. The species epithet honours the Australian chemist and lichenologist Jack Elix. Initially classified in the genus Caloplaca, Ulrik Søchting and colleagues proposed a transfer to genus Sirenophila in 2013. In 2017, this taxon was assigned as the type species of the newly circumscribed Elixjohnia, a genus also named after Elix.

== Description ==
Elixjohnia jackelixii has a distinct, multilayered appearance. It starts with sterile outer rings measuring 2–3 mm in width that are brownish or dirty greenish-yellow, dull, smooth, and continuous. These zones thicken towards the centre and may become cracked and eroded, sometimes forming structures similar to isidia. The areoles (small irregular patches on the surface) range from 0.5 to 0.8 mm across and can be whitish, yellowish, or greyish. The upper surface is often visibly cracked, revealing the medulla beneath.

The apothecia (fruiting bodies) are commonly produced, measuring 0.3–0.7 mm in diameter and about 0.35 mm thick. They are usually sessile (attached directly without a stalk) and can be rounded or irregular, influenced by neighbouring apothecia. The apothecia initially appear zeorine (sunken) but then become more prominent, resembling lecanorine to biatorine types as the true exciple deteriorates. The thalline exciple, the rim surrounding the disc of the apothecia, varies in colour from dull yellow to grey and is about 0.03–0.05 mm wide. The true exciple (the outermost layer of the apothecium) can be bright to dull yellow, dull yellow-orange, or deep orange, and sometimes blends in with the disc. The disc itself is flat, and brownish-orange with a reddish to dull orange tinge.

The thalline exciple has a cortical layer about 15–20 μm thick. The hymenium, the fertile layer of cells, is 60–70 μm high, and the subhymenium, the layer beneath it, is 50–70 μm thick and slightly dirty yellowish. The paraphyses, or filamentous structures in the hymenium, are richly branched and slightly swollen at the tips, measuring 3–4 μm in diameter. Unique oil cells and 'oil chains' within the paraphyses can become brownish, especially when treated with a solution of potassium hydroxide (K).

The lichen produces eight-spored asci (spore-bearing structures), with mature polarilocular ascospores often accompanied by aborted spores. The ascospores are narrowly to broadly ellipsoid with a slight tapering at the ends and wider at the septum, typically measuring 10–13 by 5–6 μm with septa 4–6 μm wide.

Chemically, the epihymenium and outer layers of the true exciple react to potassium hydroxide by turning brownish-purple as the bright golden crystals within dissolve. Parietin is a major secondary metabolite in this lichen.

== Habitat and distribution ==
Elixjohnia jackelixii thrives in coastal environments, typically found on exposed rocks such as quartzite, granite, basalt, and dolerite. These locations are often at or above the high tide level. This lichen frequently coexists with other species, including Elixjohnia gallowayi, Tarasginia whinrayi, and Dufourea ligulata. Less commonly, it can be found alongside Tarasginia tomareeana, Gondwania sublobulata, Caloplaca conranii, and Gondwania cribrosa. However, the thallus of Elixjohnia jackelixii is sometimes adversely affected by lichenicolous fungi, particularly species resembling Arthonia molendoi and some Opegrapha species.

In terms of distribution, Elixjohnia jackelixii is broadly found across southern and southeastern Australia, including Tasmania. Its presence has also been recorded in New Zealand, suggesting a wider geographical spread within the Southern Hemisphere.
