= Sirenophila maccarthyi =

Scientific classification
- Kingdom: Fungi
- Division: Ascomycota
- Class: Lecanoromycetes
- Order: Teloschistales
- Family: Teloschistaceae
- Genus: Sirenophila
- Species: S. maccarthyi

Binomial name
- Sirenophila maccarthyi (S.Y.Kondr., Kärnefelt & Elix) Arup, Frödén & Søchting (2013)
- Holotype site: Port Welshpool, Victoria

Synonyms
- Caloplaca maccarthyi S.Y.Kondr., Kärnefelt & Elix (2009)

Species of lichen

Sirenophila maccarthyi is a species of corticolous/lignicolous (bark- and wood-dwelling), crustose lichen in the family Teloschistaceae. It has a thallus that is whitish or greyish, often inconspicuous and not always continuous, which can appear darker or dirty grey near its numerous, clustered apothecia. Sirenophila maccarthyi is distributed across regions including Western Australia, New South Wales, Victoria, Tasmania, and New Zealand, in both coastal and inland habitats. It typically grows on the bark and dead wood of a wide range of trees and shrubs such as Acacia sophorae, Araucaria excelsa, and various Eucalyptus species.

== Taxonomy ==
The lichen was formally described as a new species in 2009 by the lichenologists Sergey Kondratyuk, Ingvar Kärnefelt, and John Elix, who classified it in the genus Caloplaca. The type specimen was collected by the second author from Port Welshpool, where it was found growing on trees close to the shore. The species epithet honours the Australian lichenologist Patrick McCarthy. Ulf Arup and colleagues transferred the taxon to the genus Sirenophila in 2013.

== Description ==
Sirenophila maccarthyi has a whitish or greyish coloured thallus that is usually inconspicuous and not always continuous. Near the apothecia, the fruiting bodies of the lichen, the thallus can appear darker or somewhat dirty grey. The apothecia themselves are numerous and tend to be clustered together, each measuring between 0.2 and 0.5 mm in diameter and 0.12 to 0.15 mm in thickness. Initially deeply embedded within the thallus, they eventually rise slightly above its surface. The thalline exciple surrounding the apothecia is zeorine in form and whitish, measuring about 0.04 to 0.05 mm in width and 12 to 20 μm in thickness. This outer layer is composed of closely packed cells. In contrast, the true exciple, the inner layer around the apothecia, is bright yellow and also consists of densely packed cells.

The disc of the apothecia is typically slightly concave and dull orange or brownish in colour. As the apothecia mature, they become biatorine, with a distinct or faint yellowish thalline margin that may appear notched. The hymenium (spore-bearing tissue layer) is about 60 to 70 μm high. The paraphyses (sterile filaments within the hymenium), are barely expanded at their tips, measuring approximately 2 to 3 μm in diameter. These filaments are quite branched, with some branches containing oil cells that are about 7 to 9 μm wide. These oil cells can form chains and vary in colour from hyaline (translucent) to brownish. The subhymenium, the layer beneath the hymenium, is 20 to 30 μm high and clear, without oil droplets. The asci (spore-bearing cells) typically contain eight spores. The ascospores are relatively large, ellipsoid, and slightly pointed at the ends, measuring 10 to 14 μm in length and 7 to 8 μm in width. The septa (internal divisions within the spores) are wide, about 5 to 7 μm.

Chemically, the lichen reacts to a solution of potassium hydroxide (K+) by turning the epihymenium, the outer layers of the true exciple, and the thalline exciple purple. The major lichen product present in Sirenophila maccarthyi is parietin.

== Habitat and distribution ==
Sirenophila maccarthyi can be found in a variety of habitats, both along the coast and inland. This lichen typically grows on the bark and dead wood of various trees and shrubs. It has been identified on many species, including Acacia sophorae, Araucaria excelsa, Arthrocnemum arbusculum, Atriplex cinerea, Avicennia marina, Bursaria spinosa, Casuarina stricta, several types of Eucalyptus, Leptospermum laevigatum, Leucopogon parviflorus, Lycium ferocissimum, Melaleuca, and Myoporum insulare.

Sirenophila maccarthyi is often found growing in association with other lichen species, including Caloplaca hanneshertelii, Caloplaca jackelixii, Caloplaca kalbiorum, Teloschistes, and Xanthoria cf. ligulata. Some specimens of this lichen have shown signs of damage caused by the fungal genus Vouauxiella.

In terms of distribution, Sirenophila maccarthyi inhabits various regions including Western Australia, New South Wales, Victoria, Tasmania, and New Zealand.
