= Sirenophila gintarasii =

Scientific classification
- Domain: Eukaryota
- Kingdom: Fungi
- Division: Ascomycota
- Class: Lecanoromycetes
- Order: Teloschistales
- Family: Teloschistaceae
- Genus: Sirenophila
- Species: S. gintarasii

Binomial name
- Sirenophila gintarasii (S.Y.Kondr. & Kärnefelt) Arup, Frödén & Søchting (2013)

Synonyms
- Caloplaca gintarasii S.Y.Kondr. & Kärnefelt (2009)

Species of lichen

Sirenophila gintarasii is a species of lichen in the family Teloschistaceae. Found in Australia, it was formally described as a new species in 2009 by lichenologists Sergey Kondratyuk and Ingvar Kärnefelt, as a member of the genus Caloplaca. The type specimen was collected by the authors from the Camel Rock reserve (northeast of Beauty Point township, Murunna Point). There it was found growing on coastal rock outcrops, along with the crustose species Sirenophila eos and Dufourea ligulata, some of which had been deformed by the lichenicolous fungus species Arthonia sytnikii and Pyrenidium actinellum. The species epithet honours Tasmanian lichen lichenologist Gintaras Kantvilas. Ulf Arup and colleagues transferred the taxon to the genus Sirenophila in 2013, following a molecular phylogenetics-based restructuring of the family Teloschistaceae. Sirenophila gintarasii occurs in New South Wales and Victoria.
