= Elixjohnia =

Scientific classification
- Domain: Eukaryota
- Kingdom: Fungi
- Division: Ascomycota
- Class: Lecanoromycetes
- Order: Teloschistales
- Family: Teloschistaceae
- Genus: Elixjohnia; S.Y.Kondr. & Hur (2017)

Type species
- Elixjohnia jackelixii (S.Y.Kondr., Kärnefelt & A.Thell) S.Y.Kondr. & Hur (2017)

Species
- E. bermaguiana E. gallowayi E. jackelixii E. ovis-atra

Genus of lichens

Elixjohnia is a genus of lichen-forming fungi in the family Teloschistaceae. It has four species of saxicolous (rock-dwelling), crustose lichens that occur in Australasia.

== Taxonomy ==
Elixjohnia was circumscribed in 2017 by Sergey Kondratyuk and Jae-Seoun Jur in 2017, with Elixjohnia jackelixii assigned as the type species. Phylogenetic analysis shows that the genus is in the large Sirenophila-Teloschistopsis-Halophila subclade of the subfamily Teloschistoideae (family Teloschistaceae). The genus name honours Australian chemist and lichenologist John A. ("Jack") Elix. The existence and phylogenetic structure of the genus was corroborated by molecular work published by Wilk and colleagues in 2021.

== Description ==
Elixjohnia is characterised by a thallus that is typically zoned, presenting initial appearances of brownish or a dirty greenish yellow in sterile circles. These circles can be dull, smooth, and continuous in their peripheral zones, or may lack any zonation. The thallus is often notably thick, especially at its centre, but may also be evenly continuous. The texture varies, with some specimens being smooth and entire, while others are distinctly areolate. Colours can range from whitish, yellowish, or greyish shades to brighter hues of red or reddish-orange. Over time, the upper surface can become cracked and eroded, occasionally revealing isidia-like formations. In many cases, the medulla, or inner tissue, is exposed through these cracks.

Adjacent to the thallus is the prothallus, which can either be well-developed or completely absent. The apothecia, or spore-producing structures, are frequently observed and tend to be small in size. In some species, these apothecia are zeorine, at least initially, but can also be lecanorine or biatorine in form. Their disc is often a brownish-orange or yellowish-brown shade, sometimes with hints of red or even transitioning to a dull orange or a bright scarlet. Microscopically, the true exciple (outer rim of the apothecium) is made of scleroplectenchymatous tissue. The paraphyses, or sterile fungal filaments, contain oil cells of the bermaguiana-type. Typically, there are eight spores in each ascus, but it is not uncommon to find 2, 4, or 6 mature bipolar ascospores accompanied by aborted ones. These ascospores can range from narrowly to broadly ellipsoid in shape. Finally, the conidia, or asexual spores, are broad and either ellipsoid or bacilliform, with measurements typically falling between 2–3 by 1.2–1.7 μm. Parietin is the major lichen substance associated with this genus.

== Habitat and distribution ==
Elixjohnia species predominantly colonise exposed coastal rocks, including quartzite, granite, basalt, and dolerite. These lichens are typically found at or above the high tide level. It is not uncommon to find species such as E. jackelixii and E. gallowayi growing alongside each other. Additionally, they often share their habitat with species from various genera, including Tarasginia whinrayi, T. tomareana, Sirenophila eos, Jackelixia ligulata, Gondwania sublobulata, and Caloplaca conranii. Geographically, Elixjohnia species have an Australasian distribution, spanning across southern and southeastern Australia, Tasmania, and New Zealand.

== Species ==
- Elixjohnia bermaguiana (S.Y.Kondr. & Kärnefelt) S.Y.Kondr. & Hur (2017)
- Elixjohnia gallowayi (S.Y.Kondr., Kärnefelt & Filson) S.Y.Kondr. & Hur (2017)
- Elixjohnia jackelixii (S.Y.Kondr., Kärnefelt & A.Thell) S.Y.Kondr. & Hur (2017)
- Elixjohnia ovis-atra (Søchting, Søgaard & Sancho) S.Y.Kondr. (2018)
