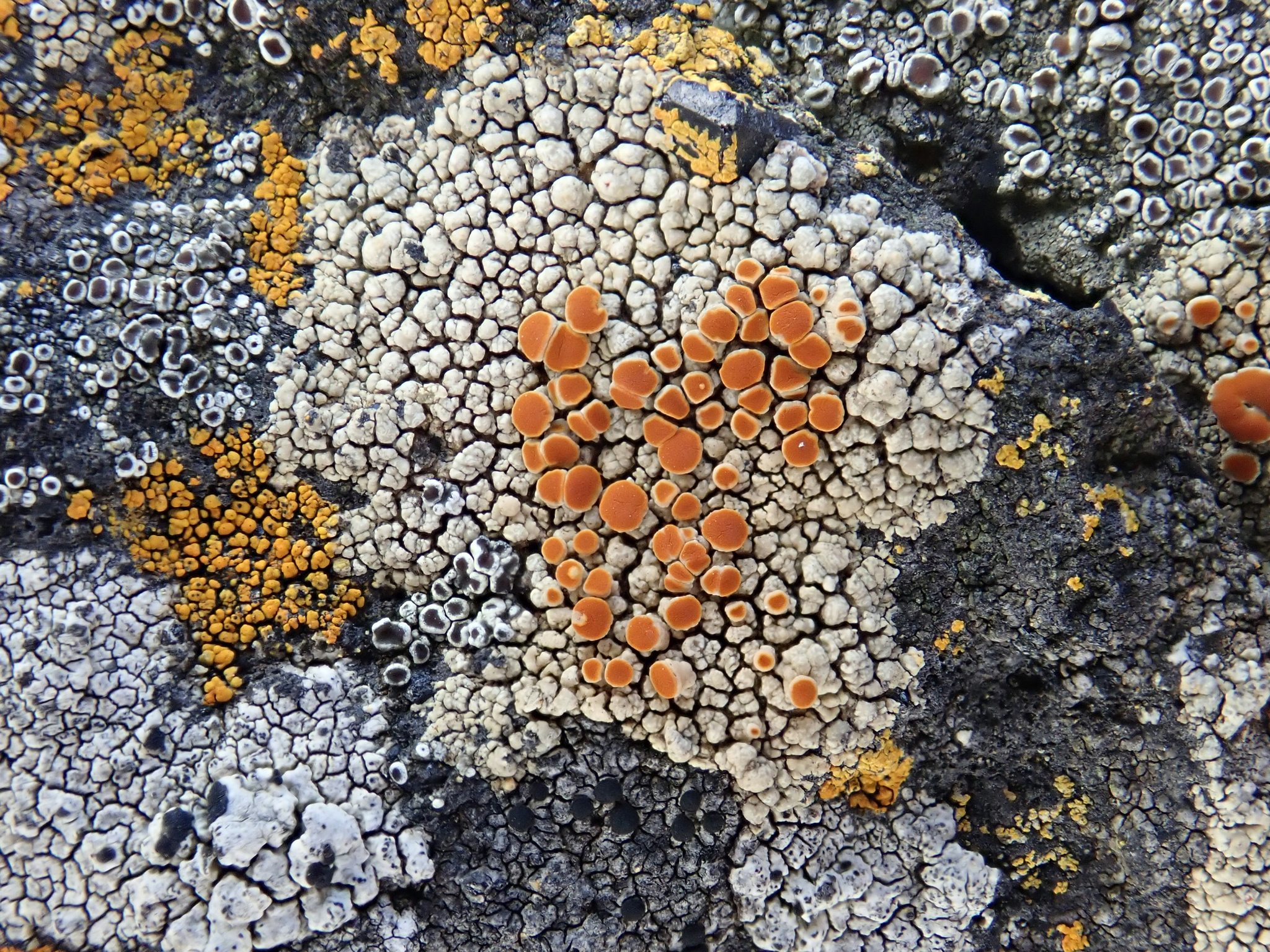

Scientific classification
- Domain: Eukaryota
- Kingdom: Fungi
- Division: Ascomycota
- Class: Lecanoromycetes
- Order: Teloschistales
- Family: Teloschistaceae
- Genus: Sirenophila
- Species: S. Sirenophila

Binomial name
- Sirenophila Sirenophila (C.W. Dodge) Søchting & de Lange

Synonyms
- Synonymy: Caloplaca maculata D.J.Galloway; Caloplaca macquariensis C.W. Dodge

= Sirenophila macquariensis =

Species of lichen

Sirenophila macquariensis is a species of lichenized fungus found on Macquarie Island, the southeastern South Island of New Zealand, and the Chatham Islands.

== Taxonomy ==
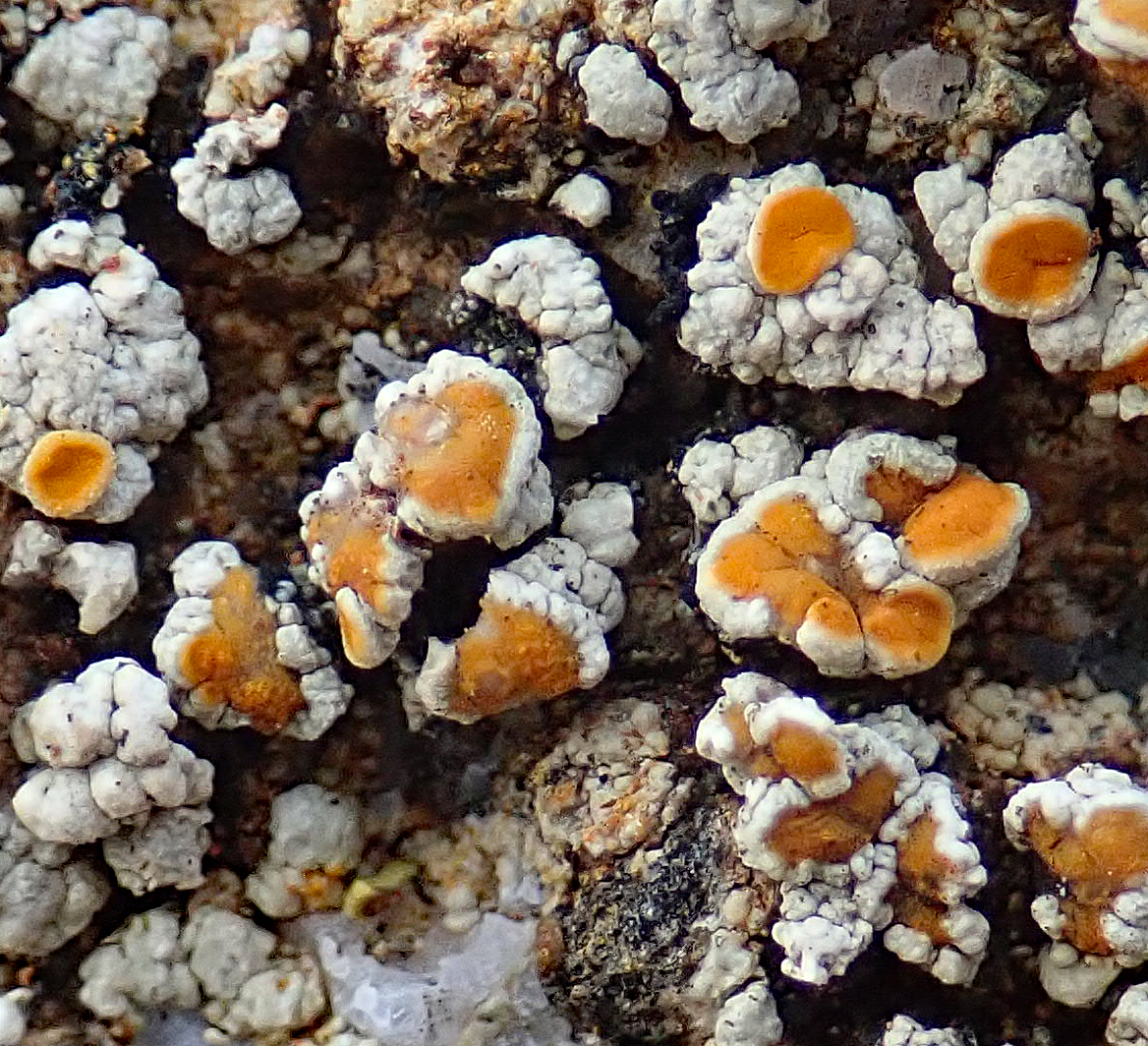
Close-up view of Sirenophila macquariensis

Sirenophila macquariensis was first described by Carroll William Dodge in 1968 as Caloplaca macquariensis, based on a type specimen collected from Macquarie Island. In 2024, Caloplaca maculata, a taxon first described by lichenologist David Galloway in 2004 collected from a rocky shoreline on Chatham Island, was synonymised with Dodge's taxon. At the same time, the taxon was moved to the genus Sirenophila by Ulrik Søchting and Peter de Lange, based on nrDNA ITS sequence data. The species epithet refer to Macquarie Island, as Dodge likely believed the species was endemic to this location.

== Description ==
Sirenophila macquariensis is a crustose lichen which grows in irregular rosettes measuring 1–3 cm (0.39–1.18 in) in diameter. The thallus (the vegetative body of the lichen) is pale greenish-white when wet and greyish-white when dry, without a noticeable prothallus. Its surface is areolate, broken into angular polygons separated by deep cracks. The disc-like apothecia (the lichen's fruiting bodies) are large and conspicuous: orange when dry and clear yellow when wet. These are sessile – attached directly at their base to the thallus without a stalk.

=== Chemistry ===
In spot tests, the thallus is K− and the apothecia are K+, turning a reddish purple. Secondary metabolites include parietin.

== Habitat and range ==
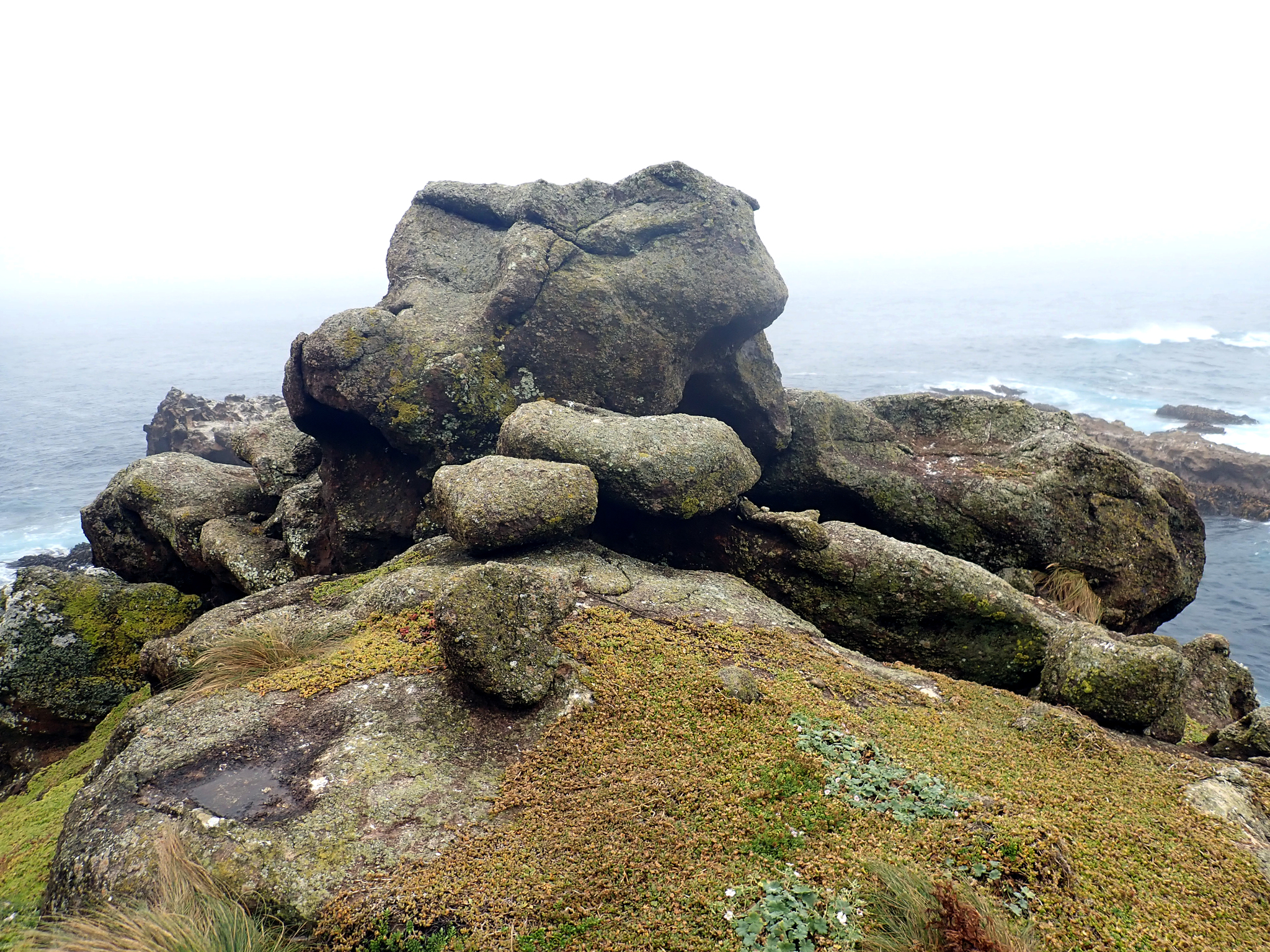
Sirenophila macquariensis growing on coastal rocks on Rabbit Island in the Chatham Islands group

Sirenophila macquariensis is found in southerneastern areas of the South Island, the Chatham Islands and Macquarie Island. It is saxicolous, growing on tuffaceous rock outcrops and basalt, typically in more sheltered locations along the coast. It has been found growing amongst other lichen species, including Caloplaca litoralis, Dufourea ligulata, Myriolecis dispersa, Pertusaria graphica, Physcia caesia and members of the genera Amandinea, Buellia and Caloplaca.
