= Elixjohnia bermaguiana =

Scientific classification
- Kingdom: Fungi
- Division: Ascomycota
- Class: Lecanoromycetes
- Order: Teloschistales
- Family: Teloschistaceae
- Genus: Elixjohnia
- Species: E. bermaguiana

Binomial name
- Elixjohnia bermaguiana (S.Y.Kondr. & Kärnefelt) S.Y.Kondr. & Hur (2017)
- Holotype: Beares Beach, New South Wales

Synonyms
- Caloplaca bermaguiana S.Y.Kondr. & Kärnefelt (2007); Sirenophila bermaguiana (S.Y.Kondr. & Kärnefelt) Søchting, Arup & Frödén (2013)

Species of lichen

Elixjohnia bermaguiana is a species of saxicolous (rock-dwelling), crustose lichen in the family Teloschistaceae. It is found in Australia. The lichen is characterised by its varying areoles, which are thin to moderately thick, flat to slightly convex, and range from bright yellow to whitish in colour, sometimes with a greenish-yellow hue. Its apothecia (fruiting bodies) are small, with a distinct orange margin and a raised brownish-orange or yellowish-brown disc.

== Taxonomy ==
The lichen was formally described as a new species in 2007 by the lichenologists Sergey Kondratyuk and Ingvar Kärnefelt. The type specimen was collected by the first author from Beares Beach in the Bermagui township (New South Wales), where it was found growing on rock in sandy outcrops. The species epithet refers to the type locality. Kondratyuk and Jae-Seoun Hur transferred it to the genus Elixjohnia in 2017.

== Description ==
The thallus of Elixjohnia bermaguiana is characterised by areoles that range from very thin to somewhat thicker, measuring 0.2–0.5 (up to 0.7) mm in width and 0.1–0.15 mm in thickness. These areoles are typically plane to slightly convex, and may be densely aggregated or sometimes dispersed. The colour of the thallus varies from bright yellow to whitish, whitish grey, or whitish yellowish, occasionally showing a greenish-yellow hue in certain areas.

Apothecia in this species are relatively small, generally measuring 0.3–0.4 mm in diameter. They are distinctly zeorine with a thalline margin that may appear yellow, whitish, or whitish grey. This margin tends to disappear at maturity but is still noticeable. The proper margin of the apothecia is orange and about 50–75 μm thick, leading to a brownish-orange or yellowish-brown disc that is noticeably raised. The true exciple is 35–50 μm thick at its uppermost lateral portion and is raised above the level of the hymenium, tapering to about 15–20 μm thick in the middle of lateral and in the basal portions. This exciple is scleroplectenchymatous, either with a matrix or separate hyphae, and cell lumina measuring approximately 1–1.5 μm wide.

The thalline margin is about 80 μm thick, with an algal layer extending to the middle of the hymenium level, measuring 50–60 μm thick. The cortex of this margin is 7–10 μm thick and composed of algal plectenchyma. The hymenium of Elixjohnia bermaguiana is 80–90 μm high, with an epithecium that is 10–15 μm thick and brightly yellow. Paraphyses are 1.5–2 μm in diameter at the lower part, distinctly septate and attenuated at the septum, and thin towards the tips at about 2–3 μm thick. These paraphyses are richly branched, often featuring oil cells as intermediate 2–3 segments together, typically measuring 4–6 μm in diameter, and occasionally very widened at 7–8 μm in diameter.

The subhymenium is approximately 50 μm thick and contains oil droplets. Asci typically contain 8 (less commonly 6 to 4) spores, with ascospores mostly of the same size. These ascospores are relatively long, with a wide septum, measuring 9–14 by 4.5–7 μm, with the septum usually 4–6 μm thick.

== Habitat and distribution ==
Elixjohnia bermaguiana is predominantly found in coastal environments, where it establishes itself on a diverse range of rocky substrates, including granite, mudstone, and quartzite. This lichen typically grows in open, sun-exposed settings and is often found cohabiting with species like Sirenophila eos and Xanthoria ligulata. As a common yellow coastal lichen within the genus Elixjohnia, its presence has been recorded across various regions in Australia, including Western Australia, New South Wales, and Tasmania.
