= Sirenophila cliffwetmorei =

Scientific classification
- Domain: Eukaryota
- Kingdom: Fungi
- Division: Ascomycota
- Class: Lecanoromycetes
- Order: Teloschistales
- Family: Teloschistaceae
- Genus: Sirenophila
- Species: S. cliffwetmorei

Binomial name
- Sirenophila cliffwetmorei (S.Y.Kondr. & Kärnefelt) S.Y.Kondr. (2015)

Synonyms
- Caloplaca cliffwetmorei S.Y.Kondr. & Kärnefelt (2009)

Species of lichen

Sirenophila cliffwetmorei is a species of saxicolous (rock-dwelling), crustose lichen in the family Teloschistaceae. It is found in Australia. Its thallus can reach up to 1 centimetre in width, has a whitish to whitish-grey colour, and is very thin, sometimes almost merging with the substrate, and has paler edges with a darker grey centre. Its numerous tiny apothecia (fruiting bodies) give the thallus a yellow-orange appearance.

== Taxonomy ==
The lichen was first formally described in 2009 by the lichenologists Sergey Kondratyuk and Ingvar Kärnefelt. The type specimen was collected from Tasmania's Furneaux Group in the Bass Strait. The exact location was Flinders Island, at Yellow Beach, approximately 80 metres from the western end of the beach. The specimen was found on both living and dead branches of a large Acacia longifolia var. sophorae tree situated at the head of Yellow Beach. The species epithet honours American lichenologist Clifford Wetmore. Kondratyuk transferred the taxon to the genus Sirenophila in 2015.

== Description ==
Sirenophila cliffwetmorei has a thallus that can grow up to 1 cm in width, with a whitish to whitish-grey colouration. The thallus is very thin, sometimes almost merging with the underlying substrate (endophloeodal), and tends to be paler around the edges, with a darker grey hue near the centre. There is no developed hypothallus.

The apothecia of Sirenophila cliffwetmorei are the most prominent feature of this species, and give the entire thallus a yellow-orange appearance. They range from 0.2 to 0.6 mm in diameter and up to 0.17 mm thick. They are usually numerous and somewhat clustered, initially immersed within the thallus but becoming more prominent (sessile) over time. The apothecia start as lecanorine in form with a distinct yellowish margin, eventually transitioning to a zeorine form with a slightly indented edge. The discs of the apothecia are usually slightly concave or flat and have a dull orange to brownish colour, often covered with a yellow pruina. The thalline exciple is formed by a palisade plectenchymatous cortical layer, while the true exciple is scleroplectenchymatous. The hymenium stands at about 80 μm in height and the epihymenium is brownish-orange, turning gradually brownish when treated with a solution of potassium hydroxide (K). The paraphyses are thin and quite branched, with oil cells that form apical "oil chains" and become brownish or greyish-brown; these structures are especially visible in potassium hydroxide. The subhymenium layer measures 50–60 μm in thickness. The asci often contain golden or brownish contents, or golden ascospores, and are typically contain eight spores, though some spores may be aborted. The ascospores are ellipsoid with tapering ends, typically measuring 10–13 by 5–6 μm. The septa (internal partitions) are wide, about 4–5 μm, and the cell wall is approximately 1 μm thick.

Chemically, the epithecium reacts with potassium hydroxide to turn brownish purple, becoming dull rose or hyaline, while the ascospore and the contents of the asci turn crimson-purple or violet. This species contains parietin as a major secondary metabolite, along with minor amounts of emodin, and trace amounts of fallacinal, teloschistin, and parietinic acid.

== Habitat and distribution ==
Sirenophila cliffwetmorei predominantly grows on the bark and branches of various tree species. Its preferred hosts include Acacia melanoxylon, Acacia diffusa, Acacia longifolia var. sophorae, Atriplex cinerea, Callitris womboidea, and Leptospermum scoparium. It is often found cohabiting with another lichen species, Caloplaca maccarthyi.

This lichen has been identified in several scattered locations across southern Australia. However, due to its unobtrusive nature, it is likely that Sirenophila cliffwetmorei is more widespread than recorded, as it may have been overlooked in some areas.
