= Elixjohnia gallowayi =

Scientific classification
- Kingdom: Fungi
- Division: Ascomycota
- Class: Lecanoromycetes
- Order: Teloschistales
- Family: Teloschistaceae
- Genus: Elixjohnia
- Species: E. gallowayi

Binomial name
- Elixjohnia gallowayi (S.Y.Kondr., Kärnefelt & Filson) S.Y.Kondr. & Hur (2017)
- Holotype: Boat Harbour Beach, Tasmania

Synonyms
- Caloplaca gallowayi S.Y.Kondr., Kärnefelt & Filson (2007); Sirenophila gallowayi (S.Y.Kondr., Kärnefelt & Filson) Søchting, Arup & Frödén [as 'gallowayii'] (2013)

Species of lichen

Elixjohnia gallowayi is a species of saxicolous (rock-dwelling), crustose lichen in the family Teloschistaceae. It has a vividly coloured thallus, ranging in hues from bright red to reddish-orange. It is found in Australia.

== Taxonomy ==
The lichen was formally described as a new species in 2007 by the lichenologists Sergey Kondratyuk, Ingvar Kärnefelt, and Rex Filson. The type specimen was collected by the second author from west of Wynyard on Boat Harbour Beach in Tasmania, where it is locally abundant on coastal rocks. The authors initially classified it in the genus Caloplaca. The species epithet honours David J. Galloway. In 2013, Ulrik Søchting and colleagues proposed a transfer to the genus Sirenophila. The species was finally moved to genus Elixjohnia in 2017.

== Description ==
Caloplaca gallowayi has a vividly coloured thallus, ranging in hues from bright red to reddish-orange. This colouration remains consistent throughout the thallus, without any distinct zonation, though it can appear as a mix of reddish spots combined with orange to whitish tones. The prothallus is well-developed, with an undulating margin that can vary significantly in size, from a slender 0.1 mm up to a broader 1 mm. There are additionally marginal fragments present, ranging from 0.2 to 0.5 mm (up to 1 mm in some cases), with varying shades of orange, red-orange, or yellowish-orange. The surface of the thallus is either continuous or shows narrow cracks, with the marginal areoles often elongating and occasionally housing conidia. The thallus thickness is up to 100 μm and features a paraplectenchymatous cortex.

Apothecia are typically small, measuring between 0.2 and 0.4 mm in diameter. They can be numerous and clustered or sparsely scattered and barely noticeable. They have a deep orange-red or scarlet hue. The biatorine apothecia initially have a somewhat zeorine structure, transitioning to a red or reddish-orange proper margin and disc, contrasting with a slightly lighter thalline margin. The disc is usually a shade darker than the proper margin, matte, and without pruina. The proper margin of the apothecia, at the topmost lateral part, measures about 35–40 μm wide with rounded cells approximately 5 μm in diameter, and 10–15 μm thick at the base. The hymenium is relatively low at 45–50 μm, while the subhymenium is narrow at 15–20 μm and straw-yellowish in colour. Paraphyses are about 1.5 μm in diameter at the base, branching sparingly and not significantly widening towards the tips, and measure up to 3 μm in diameter. Oil cells are typically located in the middle or uppermost cells, measuring 4–6 μm in diameter. Asci generally contain 8 similarly developed ascospores, although sometimes they hold 6-4 (rarely 2) well-developed ascospores. Ascospores range in size from 9–14 by 5–6.5 μm, with a septum thickness of (3–)5–6 μm. Conidia (asexual spores) are broadly ellipsoid to bacilliform, sized 2–3 by 1.2–1.7 μm.

== Habitat and distribution ==
Elixjohnia gallowayi is commonly found in coastal environments, particularly favouring rocky terrains. It often coexists with other species of the Caloplaca (in the broad sense, or sensu lato) genus, such as Tarasginia tomareeana, T. whinrayi, Sirenophila eos, and various others. The species thrives in open, exposed locations and is frequently observed on boulders that are subject to wave action.

In terms of its geographic spread, Elixjohnia gallowayi is one of the most prevalent red coastal species of Caloplaca (sensu lato) across Australia. Its distribution is extensive, with known occurrences in various regions spanning from Western Australia (encompassing South Australia) through to New South Wales, Victoria, and Tasmania.
