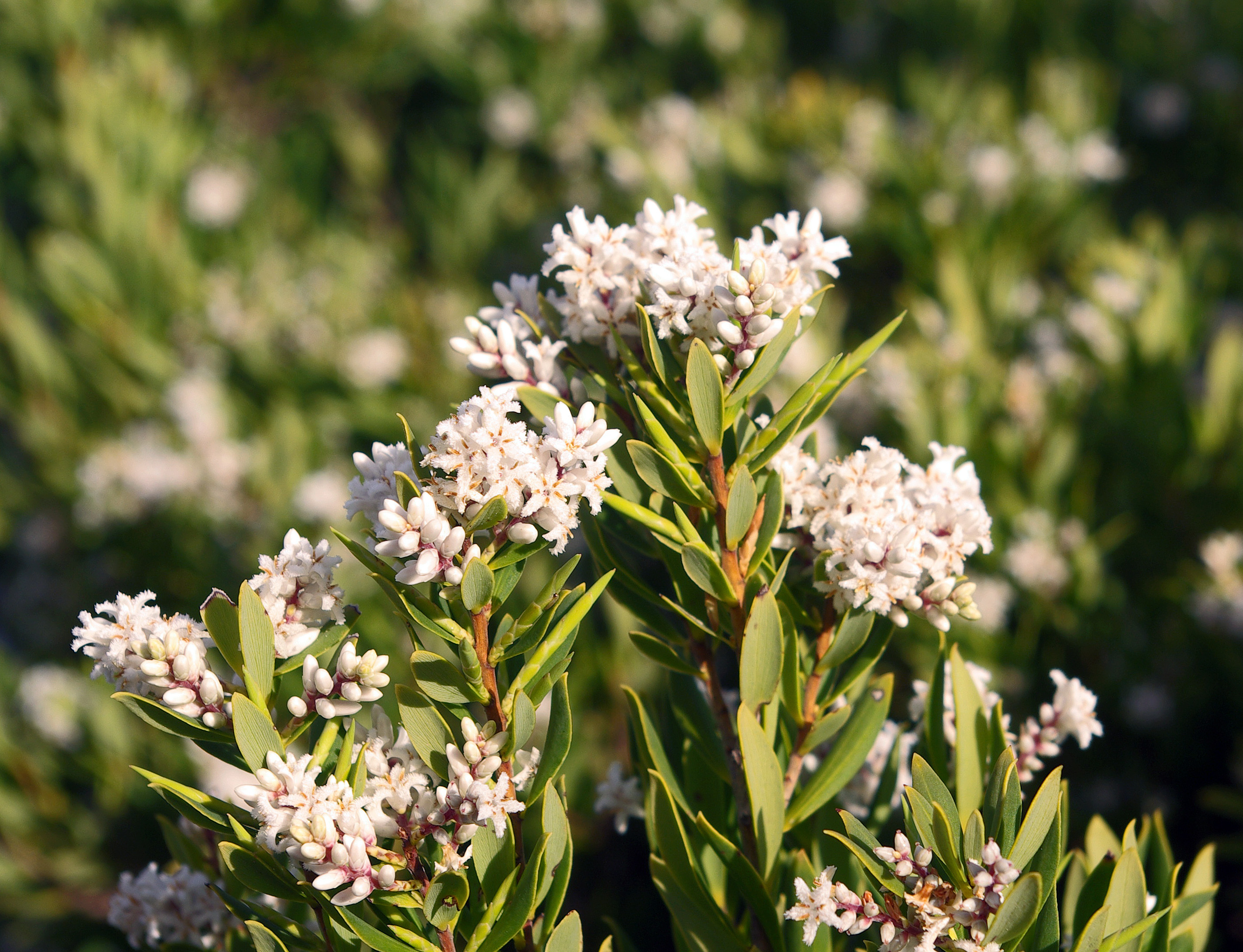
- Leucopogon parviflorus at Point Lonsdale, Victoria.
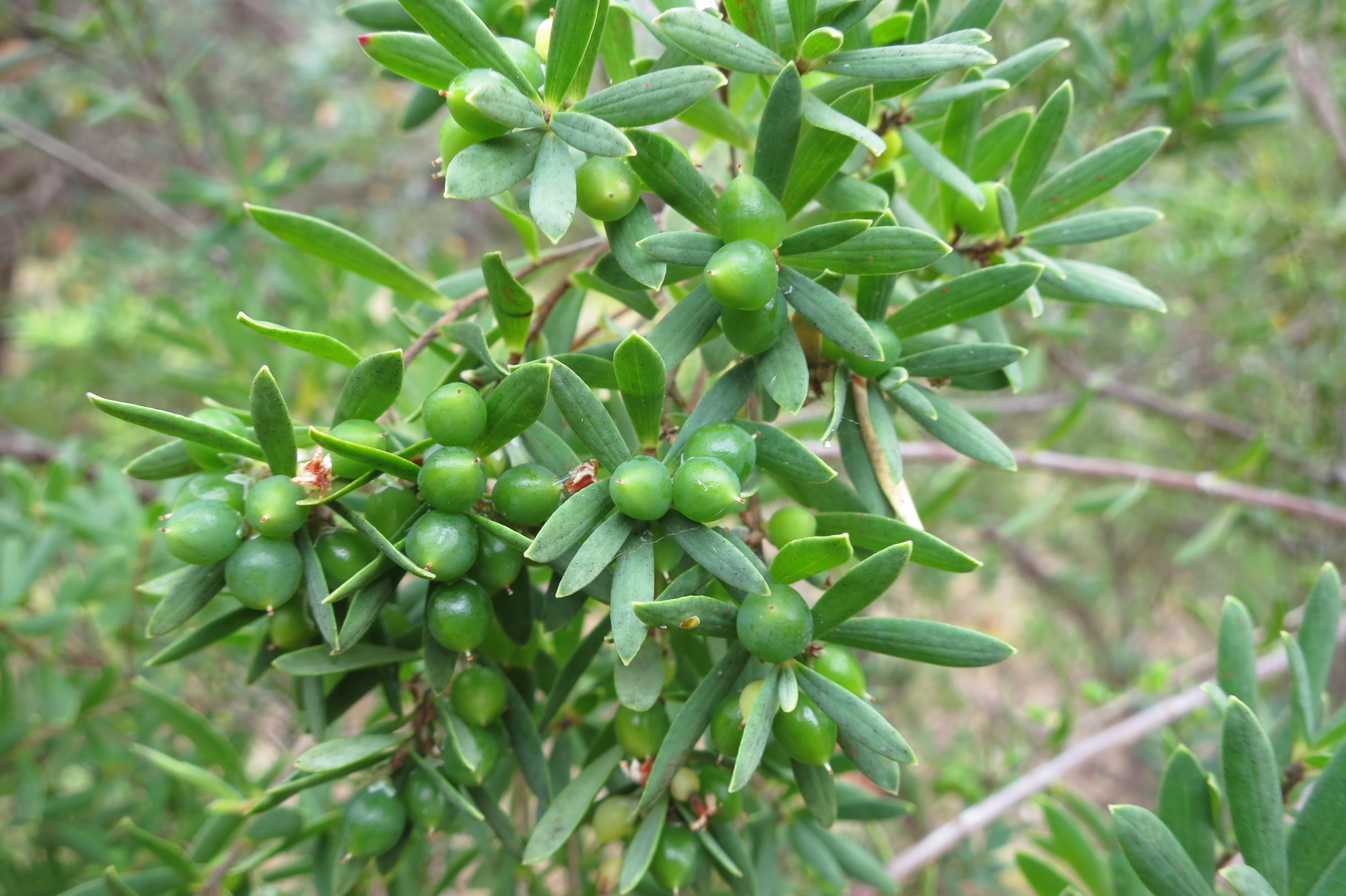
- Unripe Leucopogon parviflorus fruit at Palm Beach, NSW.

Conservation status
- Least Concern (IUCN 3.1)

Scientific classification
- Kingdom: Plantae
- Clade: Tracheophytes
- Clade: Angiosperms
- Clade: Eudicots
- Clade: Asterids
- Order: Ericales
- Family: Ericaceae
- Genus: Leucopogon
- Species: L. parviflorus

Binomial name
- Leucopogon parviflorus (Andrews) Lindl.
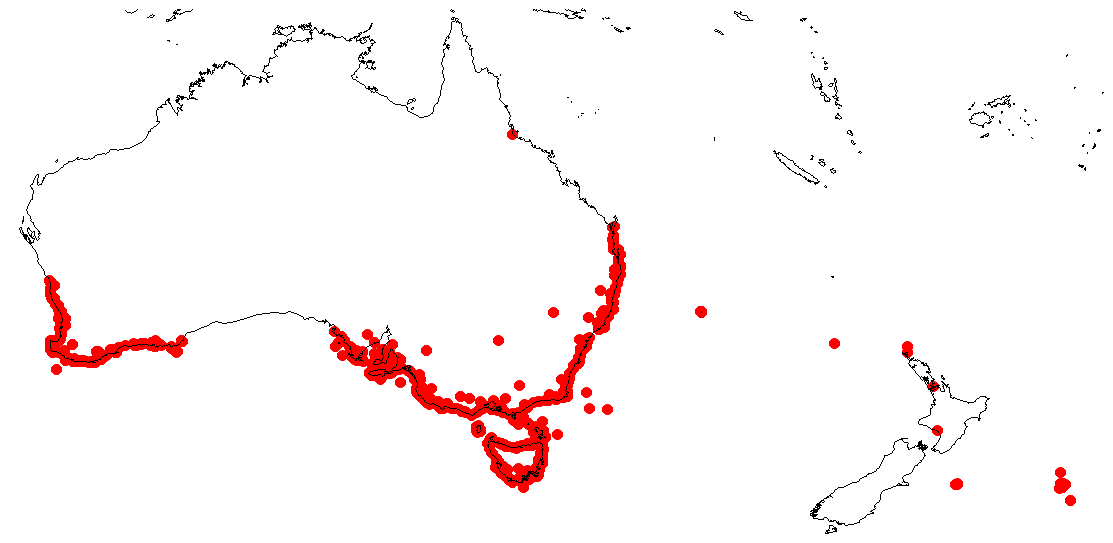
- Occurrence data from AVH

Synonyms
- Leucopogon richei (Labill.) R.Br.; Styphelia richei Labill.; Styphelia parviflora Andrews

= Leucopogon parviflorus =

Species of plant

Leucopogon parviflorus, commonly known as coast beard-heath or native currant, is a shrub or small tree in the family Ericaceae. It is native to all Australian states and territories excluding the Northern Territory and the ACT and also grows in New Zealand. The species can grow to between 1 and 5 metres in height and has leaves that are 11 to 29 mm long and 2.4 to 7.5 mm in width, often with curved tips. The white flowers are around 15 mm long and are produced in spikes of 7 to 13. These occur throughout the year.

Leucopogon parviflorus can grow in many differing conditions, from sandy dunes to rocky cliff faces, in sheltered or exposed weather conditions. However, it does grow most efficiently in sandier areas, with sufficient shelter from the elements. It is a significant food source to many Australian coastal birds and insects and relies on these animals for pollination and seed dispersion. It is also commercially cultivated by landscapers and florists to be used in coastal gardens and floral arrangements.

== Taxonomy ==
The species was first formally described in 1803 by Henry Cranke Andrews in his work The Botanists Repository for New, and Rare plants 4 under the basionym Styphelia parviflora as it was at first believed to belong to the Styphelia genus. It was then later reclassified in 1832 by John Lindley, under a new genus, and the accepted name of Leucopogon parviflorus in his book The Botanical Register: 18.

Common names of Leucopogon parviflorus include "coastal bearded heath" and "coast beard-heath" among other variations.

=== Etymology ===
The name of the genus Leucopogon is derived from the Greek language referring to the white "beard" of flowers that a mature shrub has.

== Description ==
The size and appearance of the Leucopogon parviflorus ranges depending on the size and age of the plant. Its size can range from a medium sized shrub to a small tree, anywhere between 1 and 5 meters tall as a result of the age of the shrub and its exposure to the harsh weather conditions that occur on Australia's and New Zealand's coast lines.

Smaller, finer branches found on the shrub are "soft and hairy". These small hairs allow the plant to be more drought tolerant as they prevent water loss. The appearance of the bark and trunk of the plant changes with age, with the trunk becoming much thicker and the bark developing into a deep dark brown with fine grooves and cracks throughout the body of the trunk as the shrub ages.

The leaves of Leucopogon parviflorus are stiff and smooth with leaves usually reaching lengths of 10-35mm. They are flat or slightly curved and oblanceolate (longer than it is wider, with the widest part being near the tip) to elliptic (oval, broadest at the middle) in shape. The leaves have smooth edges with faint veins that are more obviously visible when the leaf is dried. Leaf colour ranges from a pale yellow-green to a dark green on top with the bottom of the leaf always paler than the top. Younger plant growth is often a bright green.

It produces small, star-shaped white flowers that are furry on the inside. They produce a powerful, but sweet fragrance. These flowers occur in thick "spikes", which are unbranched flower-heads with flowers attached to the stem. at the end of the shrubs branches, or on the nodules between the stem and leaves that are usually 1-3cm long. The flowers at first opening, anthesis, may appear pale white or pale pink, and with age will develop into the shrubs' signature bright white bloom. Bloom size ranges between 6 and 13mm in length.

Leucopogon parviflorus is a fruit bearing shrub. It produces berries during the Southern Hemisphere's summer months of November through January. The fruits are spherical drupes, most commonly 3mm in diameter. When immature they are solid in texture and green in colour. As the fruit ripens over the summer, they mature into a fleshy, bright white berry. The "pip" of the fruit, which contains seeds, is orangey brown with a ridged surface.

== Distribution and habitat ==
Leucopogon parviflorus is native to Australia and grows widely across the entire coasts of the states of New South Wales, Victoria, South Australia, Tasmania. It also grows in the southernmost parts of Queensland and Western Australia. The shrub also grows on the coastal areas of the Chatham Islands in New Zealand. It is wide growing in Australia.

The shrub thrives in sandy dunes and flats, rocky cliff faces and headlands, and among coastal scrub and does best in soils that are a neutral pH. Since the 1970s studies have shown the shrub growing less in cliff and plateau environments, with an increase of growth in coastal habitats.

The ideal altitude for Leucopogon parviflorus is within 50 meters of sea level. The ideal rainfall for the shrub is 1200-1400mm per annum. It thrives best in dune scrub or low-open forests behind beaches, surrounded by other shrubs such as Acacia Sophorae.

The shrub can grow in varying levels of exposure. It can grow in full sun exposure as well as in mid-shaded areas and is tolerant to strong coastal winds.

== Ecology ==
Leucopogon parviflorus is a perennial shrub that has multiple prolonged flowering sessions during the winter, spiring, and autumn months followed by a fruit bearing period in the summer.

It is a slow germinating plant, on average taking 6-18 months from dispersal to begin germination. It is also a slow growing plant, taking at least 10 years to reach a notable size. The life span of L. parviflorus ranges from 20 to 100 years depending on growing conditions and environmental factors such as fire and drought.

L. parviflorus relies on biotic pollination – pollination mediated by other animals. The main pollination vectors for the species are flying insects, notably honey bees and hover-flies. The corolla tube has a wide opening that allows pollinators open access to the stigma and stamen of the flower for efficient pollination. The fuzzy hairs on the flower petals also serve to aid in pollination as they are better able to catch pollen granules dispersed by the wind or pollinators.

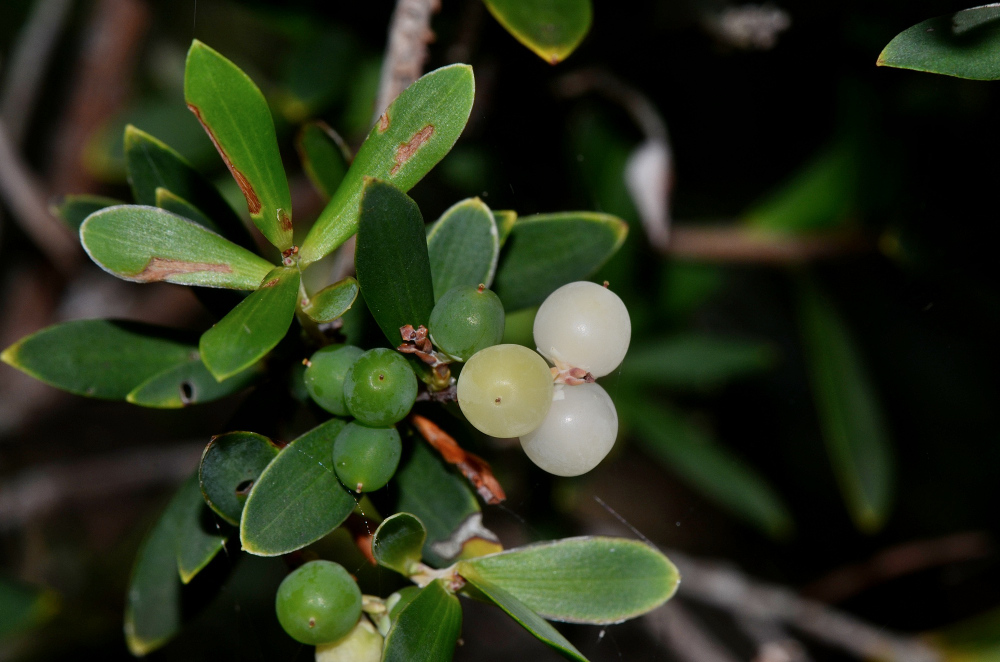
The berries of Leucopogon parviflorus

Many parts of L. parviflorus are utilised by birds for either food or other uses. Smaller branches of the plant have been seen to be picked up by birds for nest construction. Rarely, birds are seen to feed off of parts of the plant other than the fruit. The only bird noted to feed off of the leaves, Australian native the crimson rosella, does so in the winter. Lewin's honeyeater is also noted to feed off of the nectar of L. parviflorus during the winter months. These occurrences are thought to happen due to either the lack of invertebrate food resources available to birds during the cooler months and/or lower invertebrate activity allowing nectar to collect in flowers where it otherwise would not when there is increased insect activity during warmer months. The bright white, sweet tasting berries of the L. parviflorus have been noted to supplement the diets of many coastal Australian birds, such as the yellow-faced honeyeater, the satin bowerbird, and the silver gull. These birds are vital aid in the continuation and dispersion of the species as they spread the seeds that are contained inside the berries by excreting them in their droppings along the coast.

Whilst it is known that the shrub is native to Australia, it is debated whether L. parviflorus is native or naturalised to New Zealand. Whilst the New Zealand Plant Conservation Network state that the shrub is native, Agriculture Victoria on the other-hand state that it has been naturalised to New Zealand.

=== Threats ===
In New Zealand's Chatham Islands Leucopogon parviflorus is considered naturally uncommon. The more aggressive species of grass Ammophila arenari threatens the shrub in some areas of the island where the soil is particularly sandy.

In Australia, an invasive species from South Africa, Chrysanthemoides monilifera, threatens the shrub. Chrysanthemoides monilifera competes aggressively with surrounding native species such as L. parviflorus and in some parts on NSW has completely eliminated them.

The shrub tolerates drought very well, however it does not tolerate fire or other environmental impacts the same way. While the species is a "fire re-sprouter" (a species that will re-grow after fire) it has been found that after the shrub is destroyed in a fire, the density in which L. parviflorus regrows is limited. It has been found that the species displays slower growth and development than other, similar species and no flowering is observed in the first seven years of restoration.

It has been noted that there was a scarcity of berries in Victoria throughout the fruiting months in 2019.

== Conservation status ==
The species is listed as of "Least Concern" in Australia under the Nature Conservation Act 1992. In New Zealand, Leucopogon parviflorus is classed as "At Risk - Naturally uncommon" under the New Zealand Threat Classification System (NZTCS).

== Uses ==
Leucopogon parviflorus' fruit is safe for humans to eat as a sweet food source once fully ripened. Indigenous Australian communities such as the Djab Wurrung people have been harvesting the shrub's berries for hundreds of years and have extensive knowledge surrounding the shrub and other native Australian flora. The fruit is mainly eaten as a snack as the majority of the fruit is the pip of the berry, with limited flesh.

Because of L. parviflorus' slow growing nature it is often used for bonsai. Leaving the shrub exposed to the elements is an effective way to stunt the growth of the plant.

=== Cultivation ===
It is common to see Leucopogon parviflorus used by Australian landscapers when putting together gardens along the coastline as a result of the plant's attractive year-round flowering and its ability to thrive in what many other native plants find to be difficult soil conditions.

Propagation methods, and the ease of propagation of L. parviflorus has been disputed between sources. The New Zealand Plant Conservation Network states that L. parviflorus is easy to grow from a fresh seed collected from one of the tree's berries, and that it is also possible to propagate from wood cuttings, though this method is slower, and makes it much harder to successfully propagate.

Another source disputes this, stating that cuttings from a new growth is a quicker, and easier way to propagate L. parviflorus as it a difficult and slow process to propagate from fresh seeds which is often not successful. Cambridge Coast Care also states that propagation from seed is difficult, however is possible should the seed be exposed to natural rainfall. The organisation reports some propagators from the Australian east coast having success with propagation by planting "smoke-treated seeds that have been collected from bird droppings".

The not-for-profit conservation organisation, Friends of the Bluff refutes the ability to propagate from a fresh seed completely, instead stating that for a seed to germinate, it must first pass through a bird's stomach.
