= Caloplaca conranii =

Scientific classification
- Domain: Eukaryota
- Kingdom: Fungi
- Division: Ascomycota
- Class: Lecanoromycetes
- Order: Teloschistales
- Family: Teloschistaceae
- Genus: Caloplaca
- Species: C. conranii

Binomial name
- Caloplaca conranii S.Y.Kondr. & Kärnefelt (2007)

Species of lichen

Caloplaca conranii is a species of saxicolous (rock-dwelling), crustose lichen in the family Teloschistaceae. The lichen has a bright yellow thallus about 1–2 cm wide, featuring a thick texture with convex, pustule-like formations around the edges and occasionally forming clusters in the centre. Its apothecia (fruiting bodies) are quite large and heavy, ranging from 0.4 to 1.5 mm in diameter, with a flat, dull orange or brownish-orange disc, and long, narrow ascospores.

== Taxonomy ==
The lichen was first formally described in 2007 by lichenologists Sergey Kondratyuk and Ingvar Kärnefelt. The species is named after Cape Conran, a coastal locality in Victoria in southeastern Australia, where it was first discovered and collected by the second author.

== Description ==
Caloplaca conranii forms a bright yellow thallus about 1–2 cm wide. The thallus is relatively thick, comprising very convex verruculae or pustule-like formations measuring 0.2–0.4 mm wide, typically dispersed in the peripheral zone. In the centre, the thallus occasionally becomes areolate, forming aggregations of areoles 1–1.5 mm wide.

Apothecia are comparatively large, measuring 0.4–1.5 mm in diameter and 0.7–0.8 mm in height. They are relatively massive, up to 400 μm thick in section. Initially zeorine they mature into a biatorine form. The thalline margin is 40–50 (up to 80) μm thick, with a cortex similar to C. regalis/cribrosa scleroplectenchyma type and often crenulate, yellow or greenish-yellow in colour. The disc is flat, dull orange, or brownish-orange, and brownish-yellow. The true exciple is approximately 100–120 μm thick at the uppermost portion, tapering to about 50–60 μm thick at the basal and lower lateral portions. The hymenium is roughly 90–100 μm high. Ascospores are long and narrow, measuring 11–15 by 5–7 μm with a septum of about 4–5 μm.

In terms of standard chemical spot tests, the thallus and apothecia react K+ (red), C−, and I−; the lichen contains parietin, a lichen product common in the family Teloschistaceae.

== Similar species ==
Caloplaca conranii is distinguished from similar species such as C. marina and C. maritima by its thicker verrucose-papillose thallus, the absence of a hypothallus, and the presence of scleroplectenchymatic tissue. It differs from C. litoralis of New Zealand by its orange to red-brown apothecia. Compared to the Arctic littoral species C. alcarum, it stands out with its bright yellow verruculose or pustulose thallus, scleroplectenchymatic tissue, and oil cells in the paraphyses. Lastly, Caloplaca conranii is distinguishable from the Northern Hemisphere C. lithophila due to its well-developed thallus and preference for nitrate-enriched habitats.

== Habitat and distribution ==
Caloplaca conranii is found on schist and granite rocks along the foreshore, often in association with Elixjohnia gallowayi, Tarasginia whinrayi, and other crustose lichens. At the time of its original publication, Caloplaca conranii was known to inhabit areas in South Australia, Victoria, and Tasmania.

== See also ==
- List of Caloplaca species
