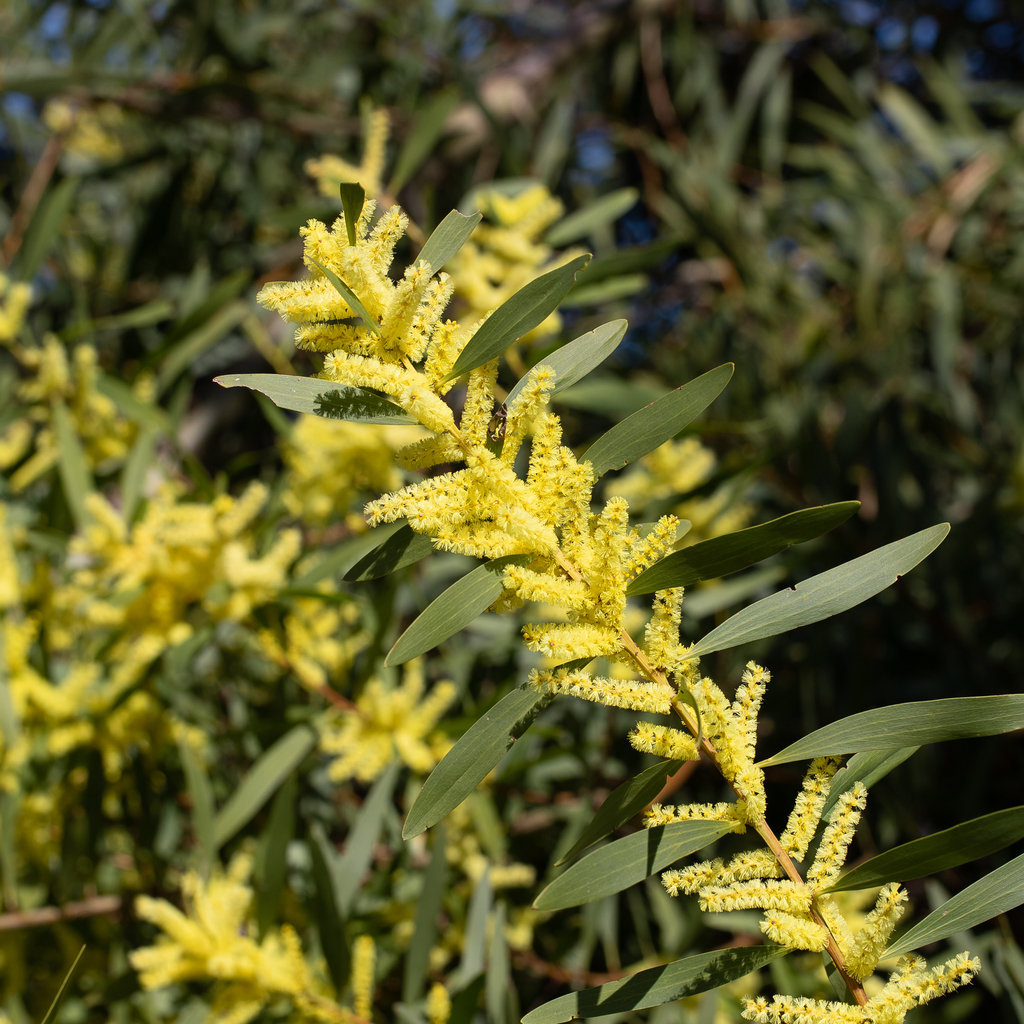
- Subsp. sophorae near Nangkita

Scientific classification
- Kingdom: Plantae
- Clade: Embryophytes
- Clade: Tracheophytes
- Clade: Spermatophytes
- Clade: Angiosperms
- Clade: Eudicots
- Clade: Rosids
- Order: Fabales
- Family: Fabaceae
- Subfamily: Caesalpinioideae
- Clade: Mimosoid clade
- Genus: Acacia
- Species: A. sophorae

Binomial name
- Acacia sophorae (Labill.) R.Br.
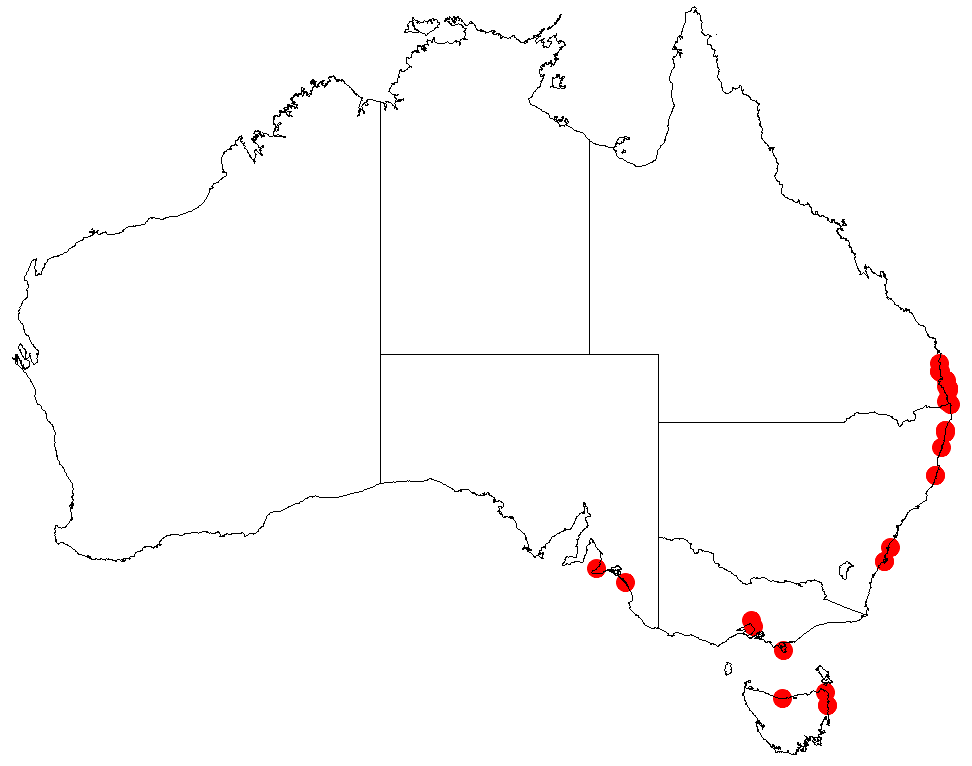
- Occurrence data from AVH

Synonyms
- Acacia longifolia subsp. sophorae (Labill.) Court

= Acacia sophorae =

Species of plant

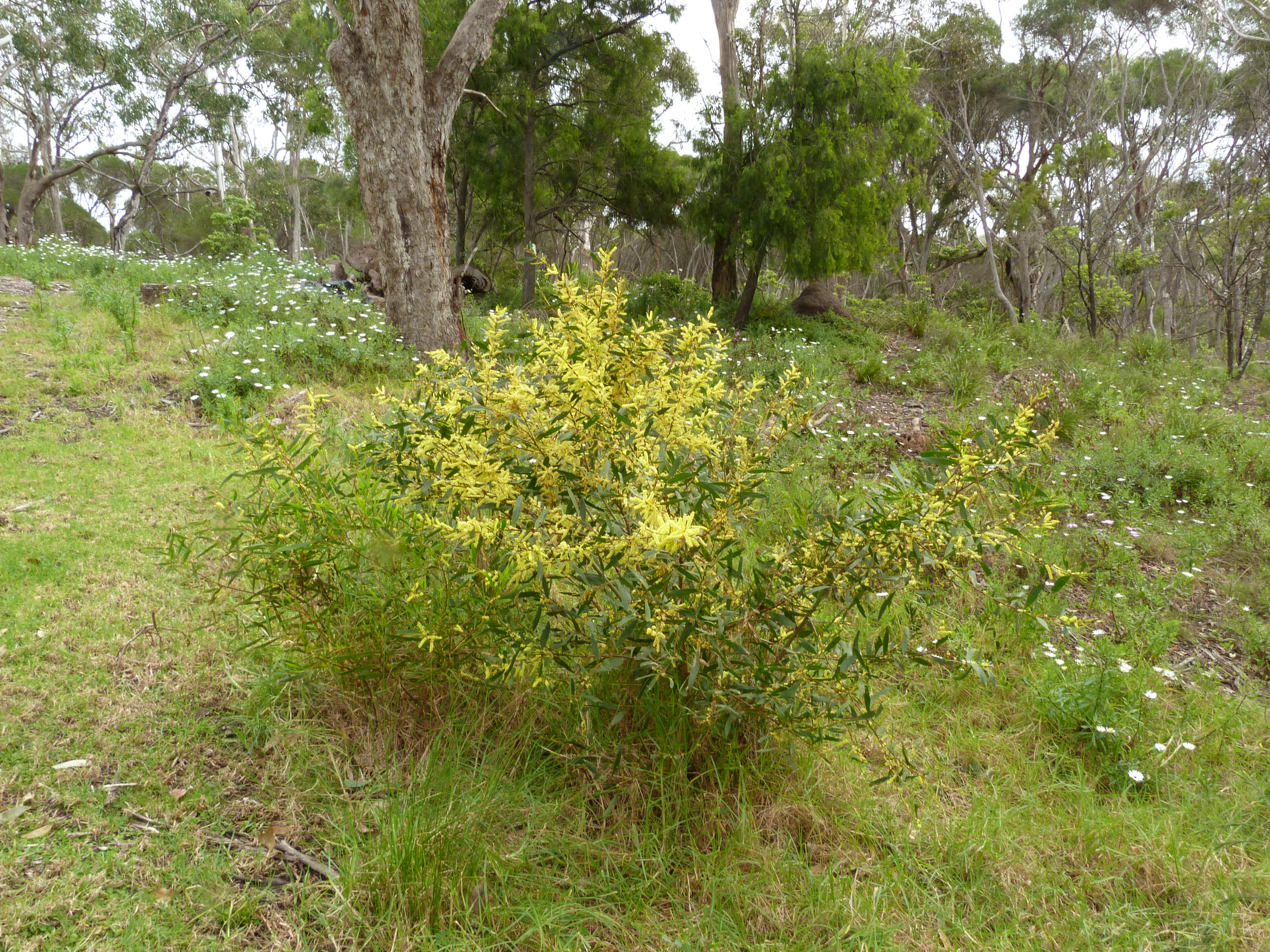
Habit near Merimbula

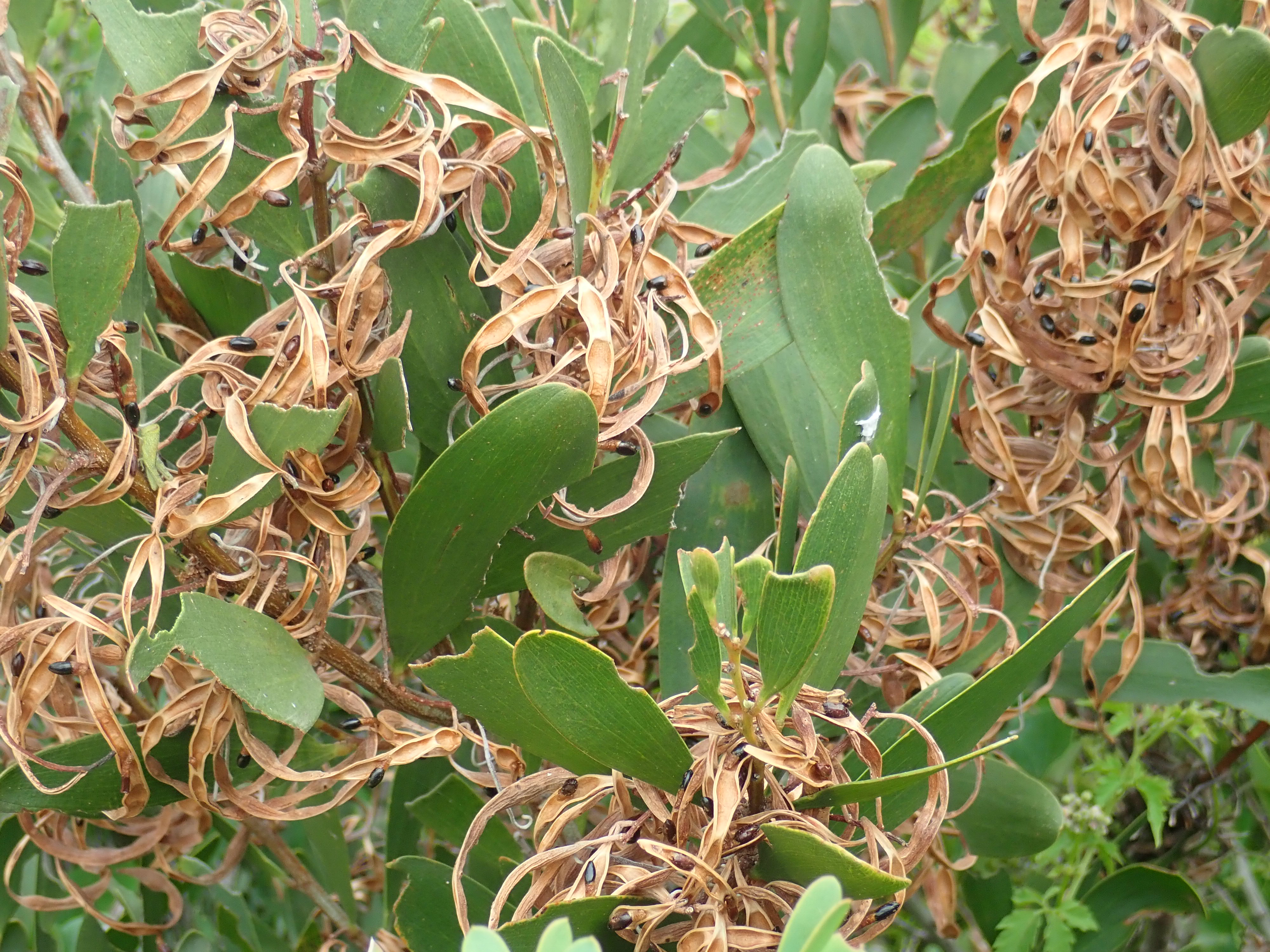
Fruit

Acacia sophorae, commonly known as coastal wattle or coast wattle, is a wattle found in coastal and subcoastal south-eastern Australia from the Eyre Peninsula to southern Queensland. It is sometimes considered a subspecies of sallow wattle (Acacia longifolia). The specific epithet refers to its similarity to plants in the genus Sophora.

== Description ==
In exposed situations it is a large, prostrate or decumbent shrub, with its trunk and lower branches usually growing along the ground, reaching up to 3 m in height and spreading to 4 m or more horizontally. The oval phyllodes are 50–100 mm long with prominent longitudinal veins. The bright yellow flowers occur as elongated spikes up to 50 mm long in the phyllode axils. Flowering occurs mainly in late winter and spring. It occurs on primary dunes, in coastal heath, open forest and alluvial flats. It is used for dune stabilisation on beaches where it will tolerate sea spray and sand blast, providing protection for less hardy plants.
