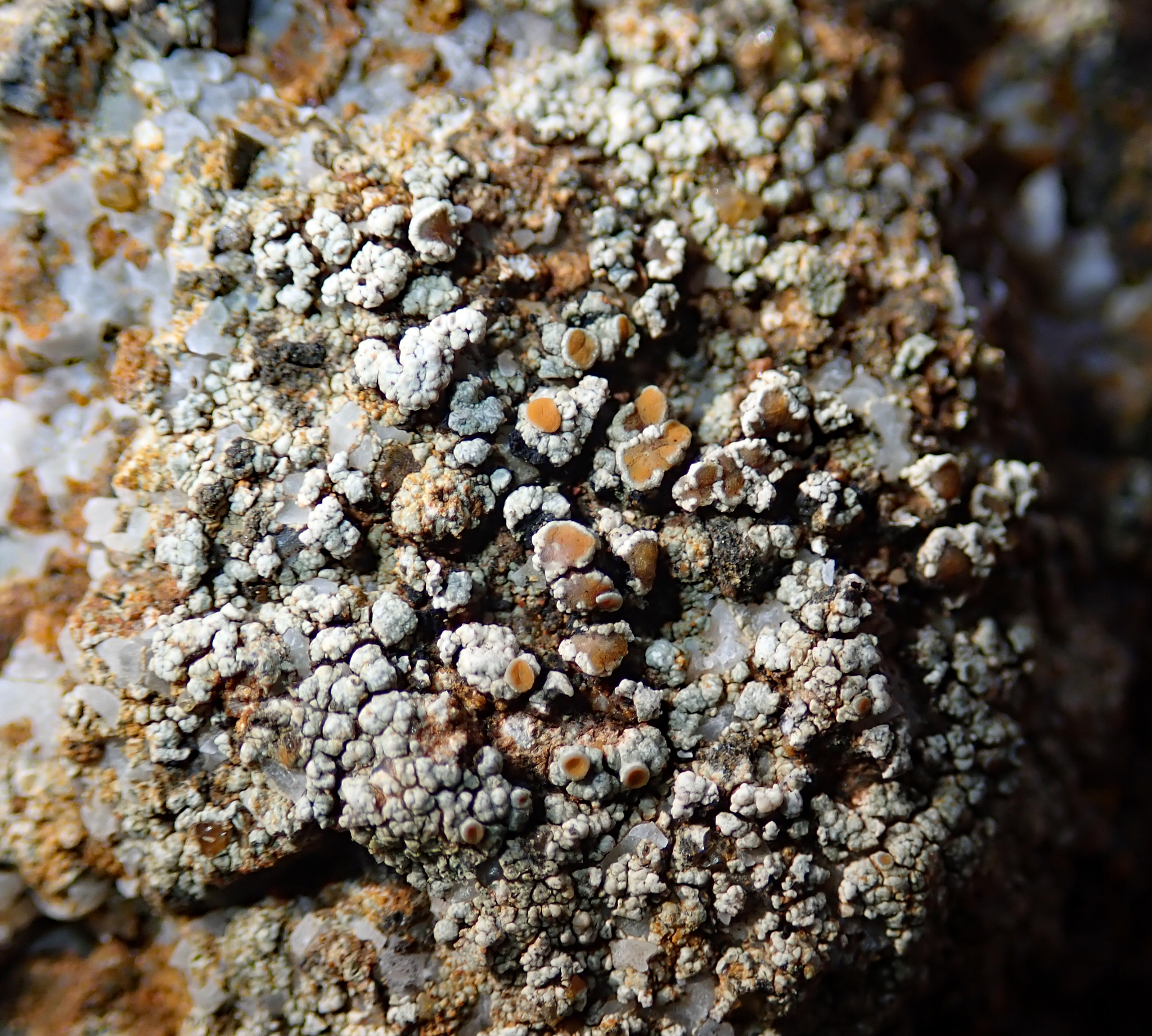
- Sirenophila macquariensis

Scientific classification
- Kingdom: Fungi
- Division: Ascomycota
- Class: Lecanoromycetes
- Order: Teloschistales
- Family: Teloschistaceae
- Genus: Sirenophila; Søchting, Arup & Frödén (2013)

Type species
- Sirenophila gintarasii (S.Y.Kondr. & Kärnefelt) Arup, Frödén & Søchting (2013)

Species
- S. cliffwetmorei S. eos S. gintarasii S. maccarthyi S. macquariensis S. tomareeana

Synonyms
- Tarasginia S.Y.Kondr., Kärnefelt, A.Thell, Elix & Hur (2015)

= Sirenophila =

Genus of lichens

Sirenophila is a genus of rock-dwelling crustose lichens in the subfamily Teloschistoideae of the family Teloschistaceae. It comprises six species with an Australasian distribution. These lichens form crusty growths on rocks in coastal areas, with some species having distinct lobes at the edges while others have irregular margins. The genus is endemic to the Australasian region, where species colonise seashore rocks exposed to maritime conditions. Like many members of the Teloschistaceae, some Sirenophila species contain orange anthraquinone pigments.

== Taxonomy ==
The genus was circumscribed in 2013 by Ulrik Søchting, Ulf Arup, and Patrik Frödén, with Sirenophila gintarasii assigned as the type species. The generic name Sirenophila, which means "loving mermaids", alludes to the habitat preference this genus: seashore rocks in Australia and New Zealand. The authors included seven species in their original conception of the genus, but Sirenophila bermaguiana, S. gallowayi, and S. jackelixii were transferred to genus Elixjohnia, while S. tomareeana was proposed for inclusion in Tarasginia. In 2021, Wilk and colleagues re-examined the multigene data that had been used to erect Tarasginia and showed that parts of the "Brownlielloideae" dataset were chimeric—i.e., they mixed Teloschistaceae sequences with non-family sequences. Using only verified Teloschistaceae sequences, both T. whinrayi and T. tomareeana fall squarely inside the Sirenophila clade of subfamily Teloschistoideae. On that basis the authors treated Tarasginia as superfluous and formally synonymised it with Sirenophila, noting that species limits in the whinrayi–tomareeana complex still need clarification. In 2024, Sirenophila macquariensis (previously known as Caloplaca maculata and Caloplaca macquariensis) was recombined and transferred to this genus.

== Description ==
Sirenophila lichens have a crustose thallus; sometimes the edge of the thallus lacks a defined form, sometimes the thllaus comprises distinct lobes. Some species have anthraquinones as secondary compounds. The apothecia (fruiting bodies) are zeorine (where the proper exciple is enclosed in the thalline exciple) to biatorine (with a pale or colourless margin). The ascospores are polaridiblastic (pierced by a narrow channel) with a long septum. Pycnidia are sometimes present. The shape of the conidia ranges from bacilliform to broadly ellipsoid.

== Species ==
- Sirenophila cliffwetmorei (S.Y.Kondr. & Kärnefelt) S.Y.Kondr. (2015)
- Sirenophila eos (S.Y.Kondr. & Kärnefelt) Arup, Frödén & Søchting (2013)
- Sirenophila gintarasii (S.Y.Kondr. & Kärnefelt) Arup, Frödén & Søchting (2013)
- Sirenophila maccarthyi (S.Y.Kondr., Kärnefelt & Elix) Arup, Frödén & Søchting (2013)
- Sirenophila macquariensis (C.W. Dodge) Søchting & de Lange (1968)
- Sirenophila tomareeana (S.Y.Kondr. & Kärnefelt) Arup, Frödén & Søchting (2013)
