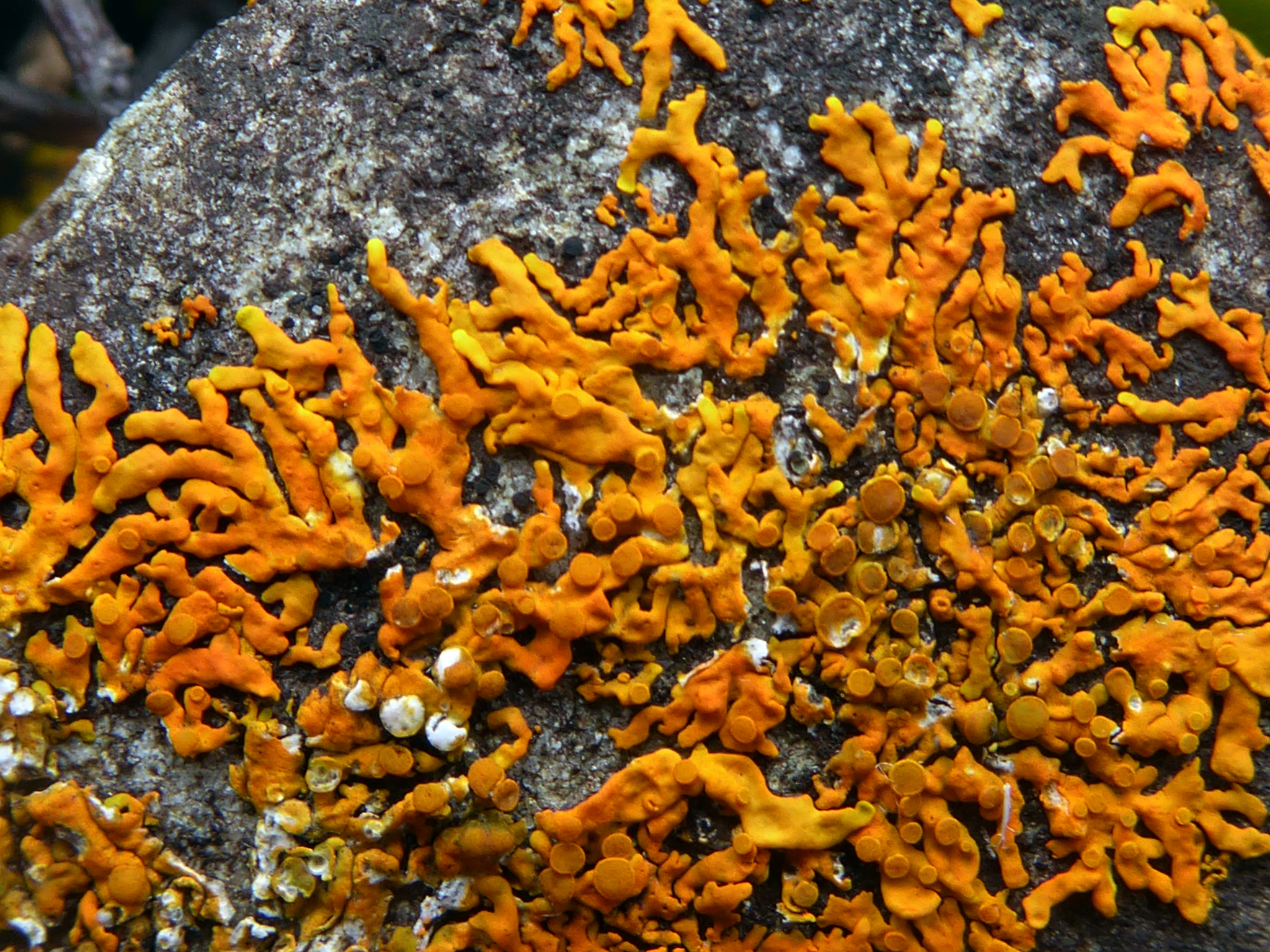

Scientific classification
- Kingdom: Fungi
- Division: Ascomycota
- Class: Lecanoromycetes
- Order: Teloschistales
- Family: Teloschistaceae
- Genus: Dufourea
- Species: D. ligulata

Binomial name
- Dufourea ligulata (Körb.) Frödén, Arup & Søchting (2013)

Synonyms
- Physcia ligulata Körb. (1862); Xanthoria ligulata (Körb.) P.James (1983); Jackelixia ligulata (Körb.) S.Y.Kondr. (2009)

= Dufourea ligulata =

Species of lichen

Dufourea ligulata is a species of saxicolous (rock-dwelling), foliose lichen in the family Teloschistaceae. The German lichenologist Gustav Wilhelm Körber first formally described the species in 1862, as a member of the genus Physcia. Patrik Frödén, Ulf Arup, and Ulrik Søchting transferred it to the genus Dufourea in 2013 as part of a molecular phylogenetics-based restructuring of the family Teloschistaceae.

The lichen is found in Australasia, usually on coastal rocks. The lobes of its thallus are 5–10 mm (0.20–0.39 in) long; they are generally longer and narrower than those of other Australian xanthorioid lichens, including X. streimannii, X. parietina, X. filsonii, and X. elixii.
