= Sirenophila eos =

Scientific classification
- Domain: Eukaryota
- Kingdom: Fungi
- Division: Ascomycota
- Class: Lecanoromycetes
- Order: Teloschistales
- Family: Teloschistaceae
- Genus: Sirenophila
- Species: S. eos

Binomial name
- Sirenophila eos (S.Y.Kondr. & Kärnefelt) Arup, Frödén & Søchting (2013)

Synonyms
- Caloplaca eos S.Y.Kondr. & Kärnefelt (2007)

Species of lichen

Sirenophila eos is a species of saxicolous (rock-dwelling), crustose lichen in the family Teloschistaceae. It was first formally described as a new species in 2007 by Sergey Kondratyuk and Ingvar Kärnefelt, as Caloplaca eos. The type specimen was collected from rhyolite outcrops in New South Wales. Ulf Arup and colleagues transferred the taxon to the newly circumscribed genus Sirenophila in 2013, following a molecular phylogenetics-based restructuring of the Teloschistaceae.
